= Route nationale 98 =

French road

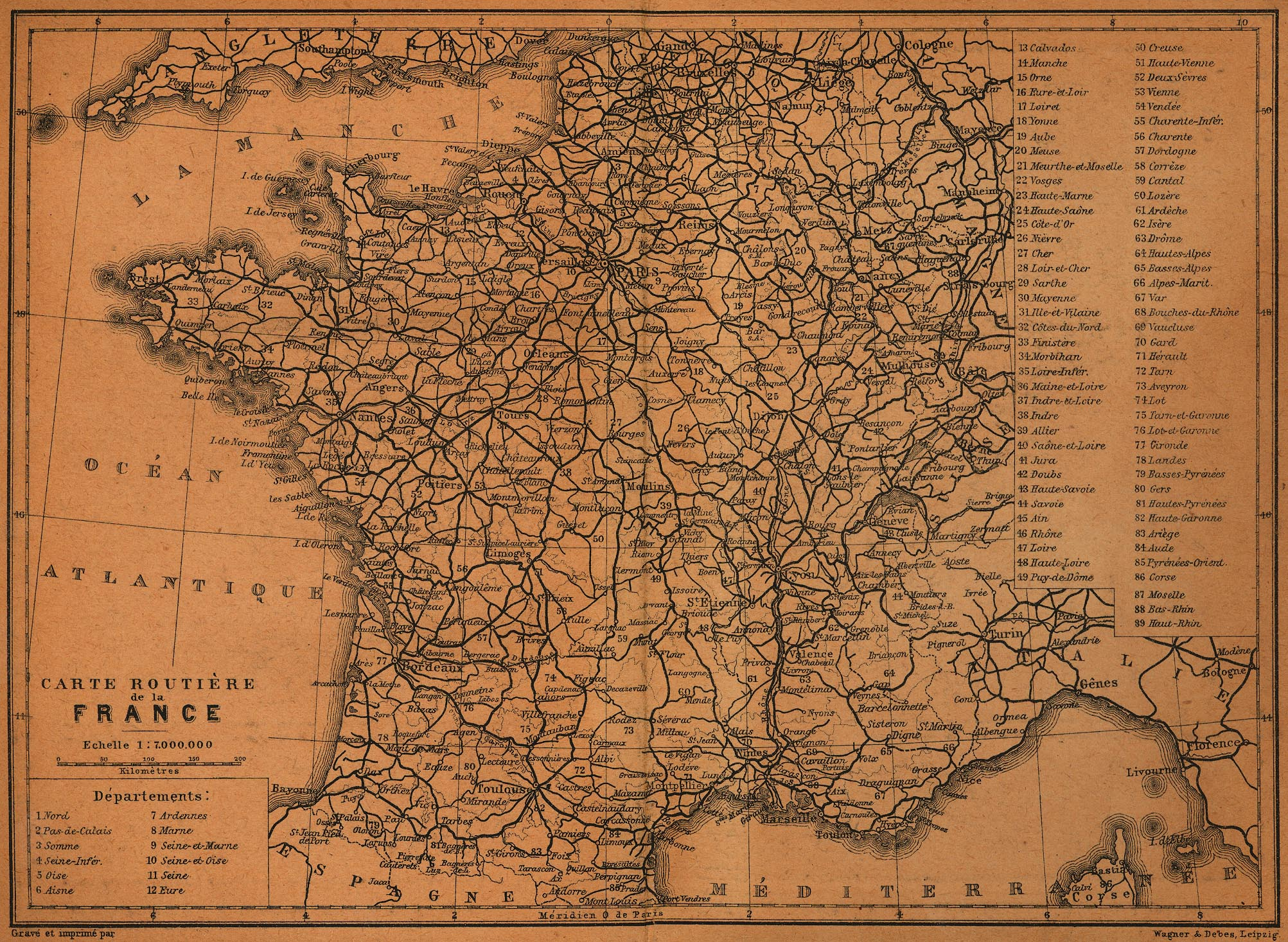
The former national road there are also shown on this 1914 map, showing importance of it.

National road RN 98 is a French road. In its latest form, it connects Toulon to Menton. It also passes through Monaco.

Following the transfer of highway powers to the départements in 2006, it became RD 98 and RD 559 and in Var and RD 6098 in Alpes-Maritimes.

== History ==
The RN 98 was created in 1824 and originally connected Toulon to Saint-Tropez, succeeding Route Impériale 117, which was created on 16 December 1811. In 1870, the RN 98 was extended to connect Cogolin and Fréjus. It was extended further in 1933 as far as Mandelieu-la-Napoule, following a route that was previously classified as part of the RN 7. Following a reform in 1972, the section between la Napoule and Mandelieu was declassified as the RD 2098. The RN 98 was then extended as far as Roquebrune-Cap-Martin, including the section between la Napoule and Antibes, which was previously made up of a combination of the RN 559c, the RD 41 and the RN 559. The RN 98 includes the Promenade des Anglais, Nice's large seafront avenue.

Following another reform in 2005, a former section near Hyères was reclassified as the A570 motorway.

== Municipalities passed through ==
- la Valette-du-Var D 98 (km 0)
- la Garde (km 2)
- la Crau (km 7)
- Hyères (km 13)
- la Londe-les-Maures (km 22)
- Bormes-les-Mimosas (km 31)
- la Môle (km 45)
- Cogolin (km 54)
- Port Grimaud D 559
- Sainte-Maxime (km 66)
- les Issambres
- Saint-Aygulf (km 81)
- Fréjus (km 86)
- Saint-Raphaël (km 89)
- Boulouris (km 94)
- Agay (km 100)
- Théoule-sur-Mer D 6098 (km 118)
- Mandelieu-la-Napoule (km 123)
- Cannes (km 129)
- Golfe-Juan
- Juan-les-Pins (km 139)
- Antibes (km 140)
- Villeneuve-Loubet (km 147)
- Cagnes-sur-Mer (km 149)
- Saint-Laurent-du-Var (km 152)
- Nice (km 161)
- Villefranche-sur-Mer (km 167)
- Beaulieu-sur-Mer (km 170)
- Èze-Bord-de-Mer (km 174)
- Cap-d'Ail (km 177)
- Principauté de Monaco (km 177)
- Roquebrune-Cap-Martin (km 185)

== Notable sections ==
- The RN 98 splits from the RN 97 in Valette-du-Var, near Toulon.
- Its route is partially covered by the A 570 motorway in Hyères.
- It goes over the Gratteloup Pass (altitude 200 m) in Bormes-les-Mimosas.
- It crosses through the Dom Forest in Bormes-les-Mimosas and Môle.
- The RD 98a splits from the RD 98 towards Saint-Tropez at an intersections known as the carrefour de la Foux, which is heavily congested in the summer.
- It hugs the Mediterranean coastline from Port Grimaud until its terminus in Roquebrune-Cap-Martin.
- It takes the name corniche d'Or (Golden Coast Road) between Saint-Raphaël and Théoule-sur-Mer, where follows the massif de l'Esterel at the border between the Var and Alpes-Maritimes départements.
- It becomes the boulevard de la Croisette in Cannes.
- It becomes the promenade des Anglais in Nice.
- It becomes the Basse Corniche (Lower Coast Road) between Nice and Menton.
- It travels through the Principality of Monaco, an independent country that is not part of France.
- It re-enters France and rejoins the RN 7 in Roquebrune-Cap-Martin, near Menton.
