= Saint-Tropez =

Commune in Var, France

Saint-Tropez Sant Tropetz (Occitan)
- Commune
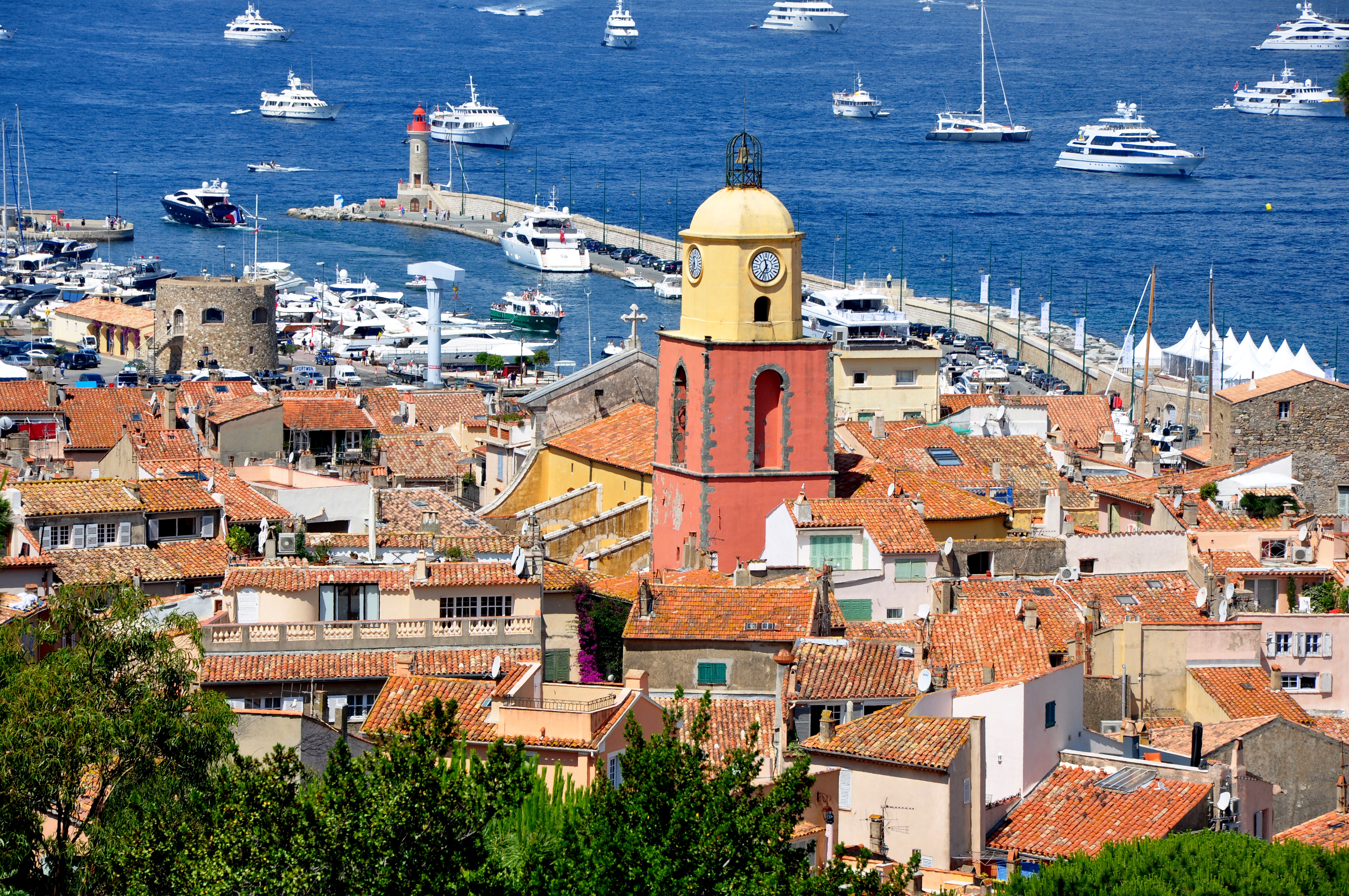
- A view of Saint-Tropez

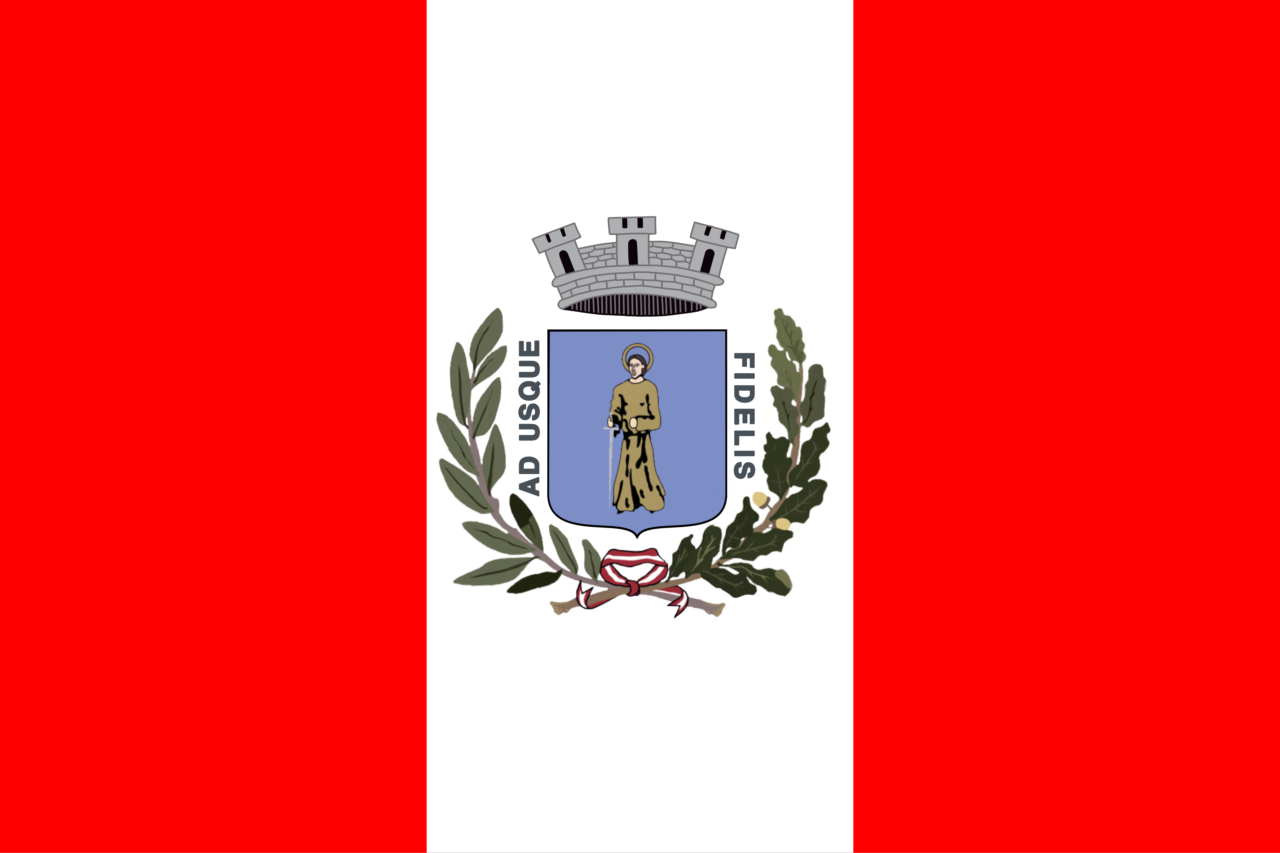
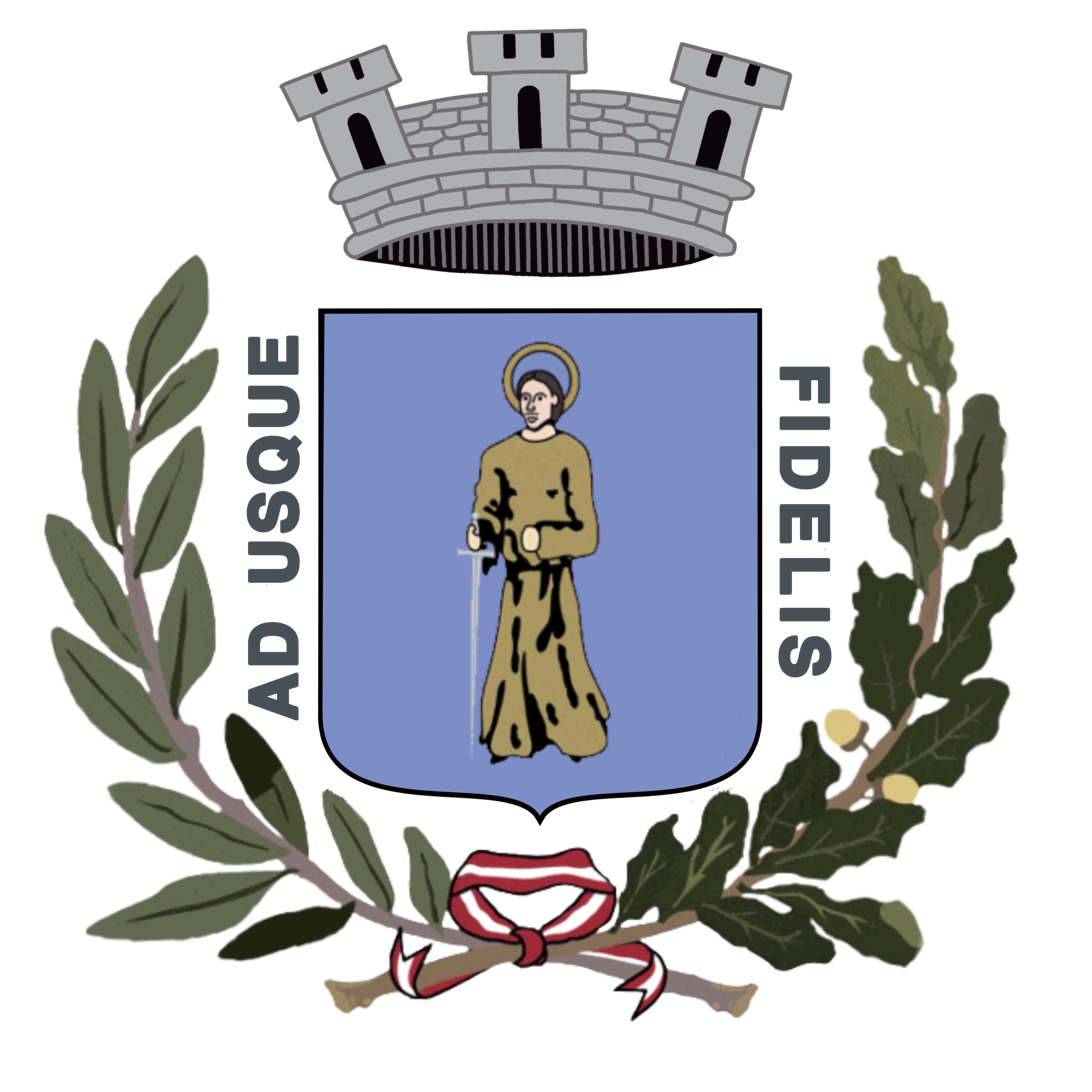
- Flag Coat of arms
- Location of Saint-Tropez
- Location within France Location within Provence-Alpes-Côte d'Azur
- Coordinates: 43°16′24″N 6°38′23″E
- Country: France
- Region: Provence-Alpes-Côte d'Azur
- Department: Var
- Arrondissement: Draguignan
- Canton: Sainte-Maxime
- Intercommunality: Golfe de Saint-Tropez
- Named for: Torpes of Pisa

Government
  - Mayor (2020–2026): Sylvie Siri (DVD)
- Area^{1}: 15.18 km^{2} (5.86 sq mi)
- Elevation: 15 m (49 ft)
- Highest elevation: 113 m (371 ft)
- Lowest elevation: 0 m (0 ft)
- Population (2023): 3,582
  - Density: 236.0/km^{2} (611.2/sq mi)
- Demonym: French: Tropéziens [tʁɔpezjɛ̃]
- Time zone: UTC+01:00 (CET)
  - Summer (DST): UTC+02:00 (CEST)
- INSEE/Postal code: 83119 /83990
- ^{1} French Land Register data, which excludes lakes, ponds, glaciers > 1 km^{2} (0.386 sq mi or 247 acres) and river estuaries.

Saint-Tropez (/ˌsæn troʊˈpeɪ, - trəˈ-/ SAN troh-PAY, - trə-; French: [sɛ̃ tʁɔpe]; Provençal: Sant Tropetz [san(t) tʀuˈpes]) is a commune in the Var department and the region of Provence-Alpes-Côte d'Azur, Southern France. It is 68 kilometres (42 miles) west of Nice and 100 kilometres (62 miles) east of Marseille, on the French Riviera, of which it is one of the best-known towns. As of 2023, the resident population of the commune was 3,582. The adjacent narrow body of water is the Gulf of Saint-Tropez (French: Golfe de Saint-Tropez), stretching to Sainte-Maxime to the north under the Massif des Maures.

Saint-Tropez was a military stronghold and fishing village until the beginning of the 20th century. It was the first town on its coast to be liberated during World War II as part of Operation Dragoon. In the late 1950s and early 1960s it became an internationally known seaside resort, renowned principally because of the influx of artists of the French New Wave in cinema and the Yé-yé movement in music. European and American jet setters followed, and tourists in their wake.

== History ==
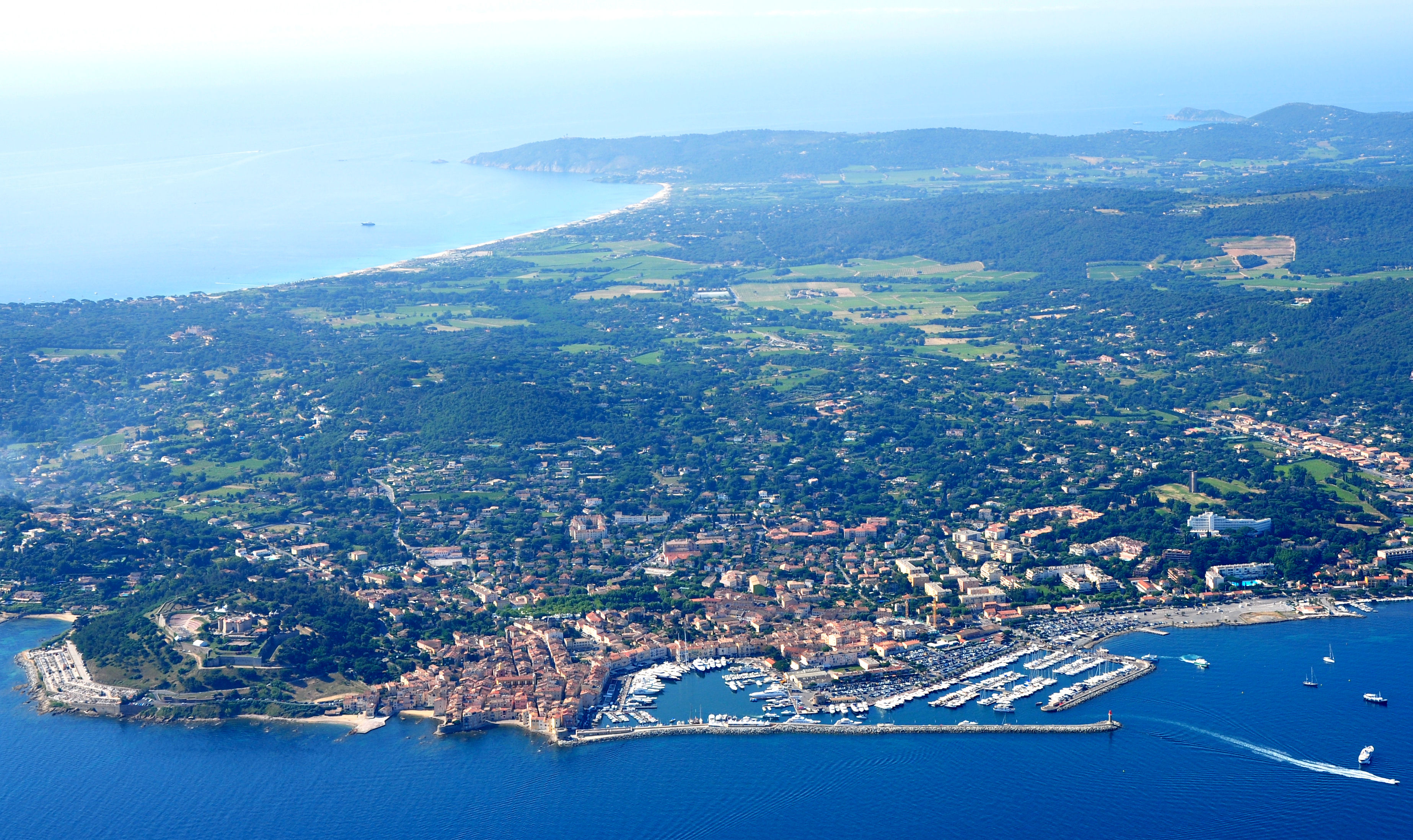
Aerial view of Saint-Tropez, with Pampelonne beach in background and the citadel and the port in the foreground

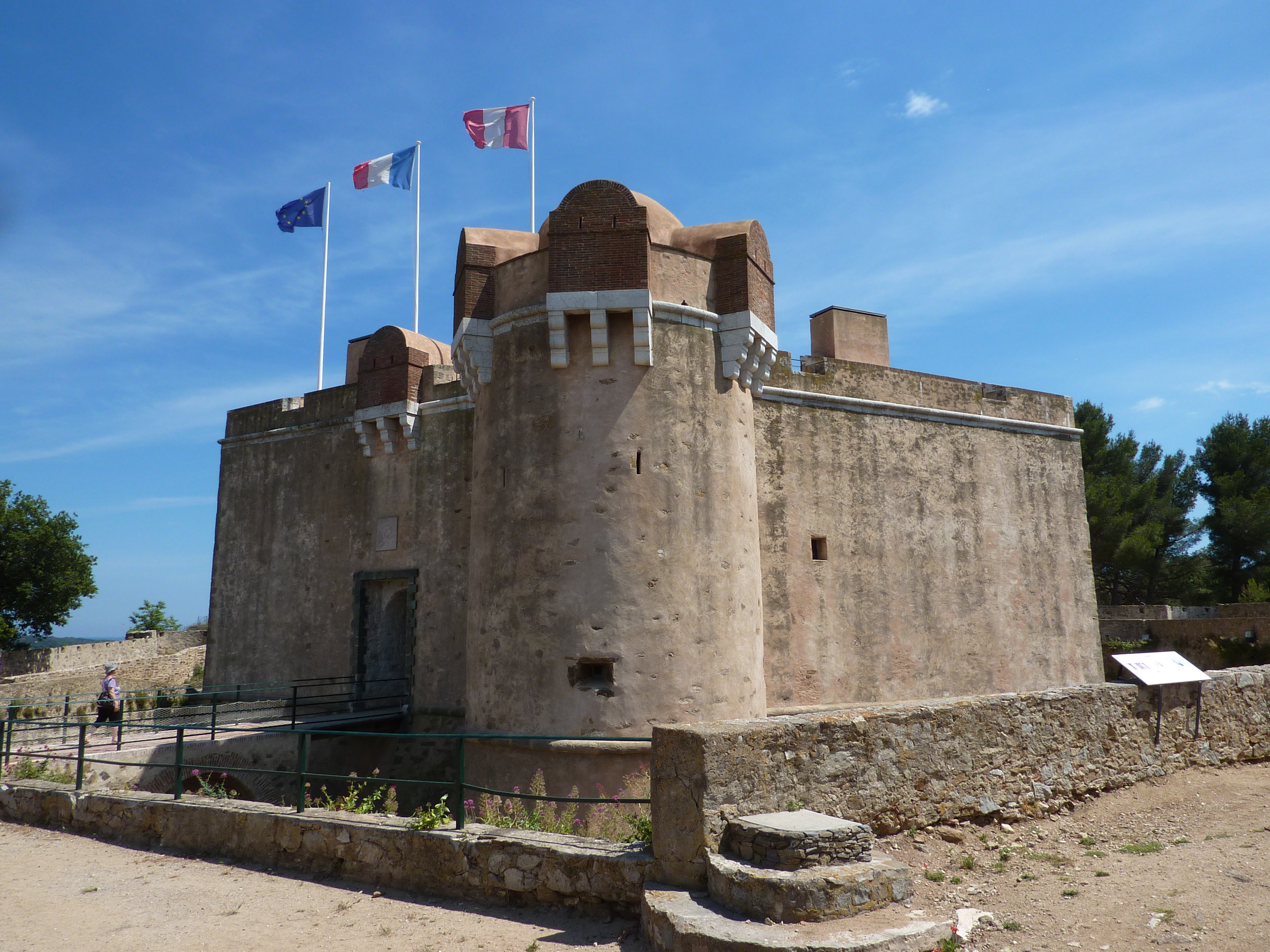
Citadel of Saint-Tropez

Map of Saint-Tropez (c. 1680)

In 599 BC, the Phocaeans from Ionia founded Massilia (present-day Marseille) and established other coastal mooring sites in the area. Through the writings of Roman historian and military commander Pliny the Elder, it was found that Saint-Tropez was known in ancient times as Athenopolis and that it belonged to the Massilians. In 31 BC, the Romans invaded the region. Their citizens built many opulent villas in the area, including one known as the "Villa des Platanes" (Villa of the Plane Trees). The closest settlement to Saint-Tropez in antiquity is attested as Heraclea-Caccabaria, today Cavalaire-sur-Mer, situated on the southern end of the peninsula, while the gulf of Saint-Tropez was called sinus Sambracitanus, which likely survives in the settlement name of Les Issambres.

The town owes its current name to the early Christian martyr Saint Torpes. Legend tells of his decapitation at Pisa during Nero's reign, with his body placed in a rotten boat along with a rooster and a dog. The body purportedly landed at the present-day location of the town of Saint-Tropez.

Toward the end of the ninth century, long after the fall of the Roman Empire in the West, pirates and privateers began a hundred years of attacks and sackings. In the tenth century, the village of La Garde-Freinet was founded 15 km (9 mi) to the north of Saint-Tropez. From 890 to 972, Saint-Tropez and its surroundings became an Arab Muslim colony dominated by the nearby Saracenic settlement of Fraxinet; in 940, Saint-Tropez was controlled by Nasr ibn Ahmad. From 961 to 963, Adalbert, son of Berengar, the pretender to the throne of Lombardy who was pursued by Otto I, hid at Saint-Tropez. In 972, the Muslims of Saint-Tropez held Maïeul, the abbot of Cluny, for ransom.

In 976, William I, Count of Provence, Lord of Grimaud, began attacking the Muslims, and in 980 he built a tower where the Suffren tower now stands. In 1079 and 1218, Papal bulls mentioned the existence of a manor at Saint-Tropez.

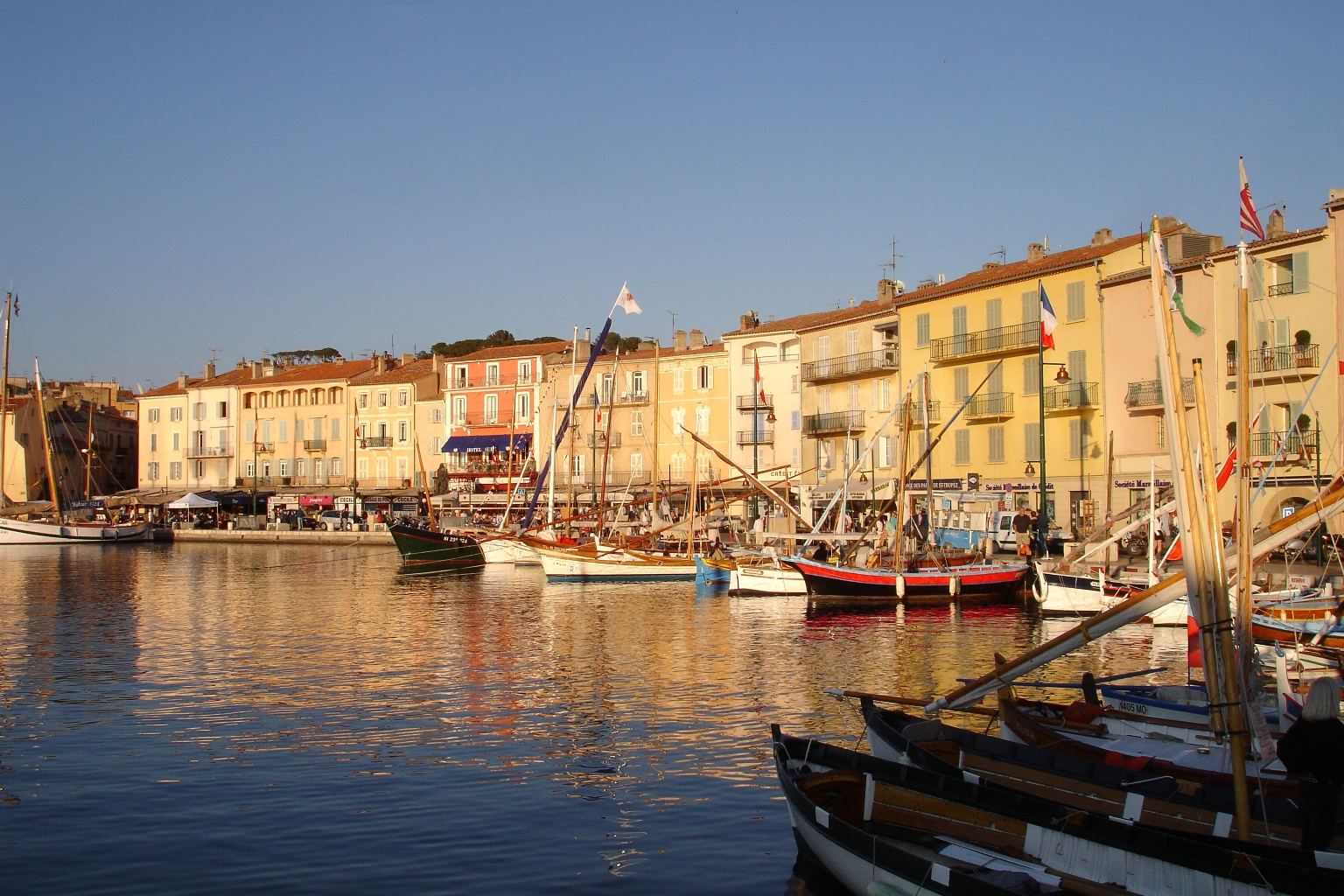
The old port (le vieux port), 2006

From 1436, Count René I (the "good King René") tried to repopulate Provence. He created the Barony of Grimaud and appealed to the Genoan Raphael de Garezzio, a wealthy gentleman who had sent a fleet of caravels carrying 60 Genoese families to the area. In return, Count René promised to exempt the citizens from taxation. On 14 February 1470, Jean de Cossa, Baron of Grimaud and Grand Seneschal of Provence, agreed that the Genoan could build city walls and two large towers, which still stand: one tower is at the end of the Grand Môle and the other is at the entrance to the Ponche.

The city became a small republic with its own fleet and army and was administered by two consuls and 12 elected councillors. In 1558, the city's captain Honorat Coste was empowered to protect the city. The captain led a militia and mercenaries who successfully resisted attacks by the Turks and Spanish, succored Fréjus and Antibes and helped the Archbishop of Bordeaux regain control of the Lérins Islands.

In 1577, the daughter of the Marquis Lord of Castellane, Genevieve de Castilla, married Jean-Baptiste de Suffren, Marquis de Saint-Cannet, Baron de La Môle, and advisor to the parliament of Provence. The lordship of Saint-Tropez became the prerogative of the De Suffren family. One of the most notable members of this family was the later vice-admiral Pierre André de Suffren de Saint-Tropez (1729–1788), veteran of the War of the Austrian Succession, the Seven Years' War and the American Revolutionary War.

In September 1615, Saint-Tropez was visited by a delegation led by the Japanese samurai Hasekura Tsunenaga that was on its way to Rome but was forced by weather to stop in the town. This may have been the first contact between the French and the Japanese.

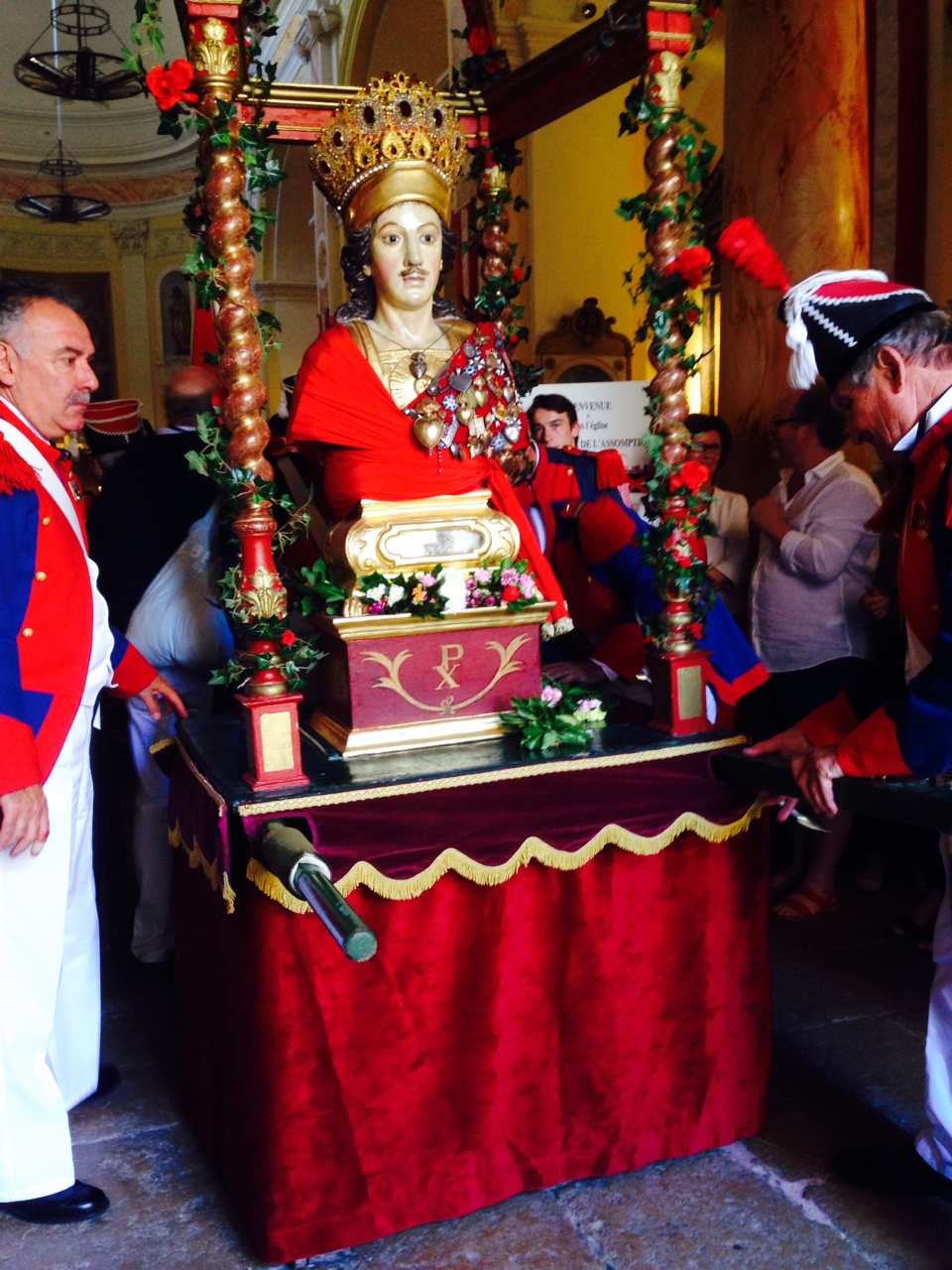
Bust of Saint-Tropez during the Bravades

The local noblemen were responsible for raising an army that repulsed a fleet of Spanish galleons on 15 June 1637; Les Bravades des Espagnols, a local religious and military celebration, commemorates this victory of the Tropezian militia. Count René's promise in 1436 to not tax the citizens of Saint-Tropez was honored until 1672, when Louis XIV abrogated it as he imposed French control.

The Gulf of Saint-Tropez was known as the Gulf of Grimaud until the end of the 19th century.

During the 1920s, Saint-Tropez attracted famous figures from the fashion world such as Coco Chanel and Elsa Schiaparelli. During World War II, the landing on 15 August 1944 began the Allied invasion of southern France, Operation Dragoon. In the 1950s, Saint-Tropez became internationally renowned as the setting for such films as And God Created Woman, which starred French actress Brigitte Bardot.

In May 1965, an Aérospatiale Super Frelon pre-production aircraft crashed in the gulf, killing its pilot.

On 4 March 1970, the French submarine Eurydice, with its home port as Saint-Tropez, disappeared in the Mediterranean with 57 crew aboard after a mysterious explosion.

The motto of Saint-Tropez is Ad usque fidelis, Latin for "faithful to the end". After the Dark Age of plundering the French Riviera, Raphaël de Garesio landed in Saint-Tropez on 14 February 1470, with 22 men, simple peasants or sailors who had left the overcrowded Italian Riviera. They rebuilt and repopulated the area, and in exchange were granted by a representative of the "good king", Jean de Cossa, Baron of Grimaud and Seneschal of Provence, various privileges, including some previously reserved exclusively for lords, such as exemptions from taxes status and the right to bear arms. About ten years later, a great wall with towers stood watch to protect the new houses from sea and land attack; some 60 families formed the new community. On 19 July 1479, the new Home Act was signed, "the rebirth charter of Saint-Tropez".

== Climate ==
Saint-Tropez has a hot-summer mediterranean climate with mild winters and hot summers, although daytime temperatures are somewhat moderated by its coastal position.

Climate data for Saint-Tropez
Month	Jan	Feb	Mar	Apr	May	Jun	Jul	Aug	Sep	Oct	Nov	Dec	Year
Mean daily maximum °C (°F)	12.1 (53.8)	12.6 (54.7)	14.3 (57.7)	16.5 (61.7)	19.7 (67.5)	23.4 (74.1)	27.0 (80.6)	27.3 (81.1)	24.3 (75.7)	20.2 (68.4)	15.6 (60.1)	13.0 (55.4)	18.8 (65.8)
Daily mean °C (°F)	9.3 (48.7)	9.6 (49.3)	11.0 (51.8)	13.2 (55.8)	16.3 (61.3)	20.0 (68.0)	23.3 (73.9)	23.4 (74.1)	20.8 (69.4)	17.1 (62.8)	12.8 (55.0)	10.3 (50.5)	15.6 (60.1)
Mean daily minimum °C (°F)	6.5 (43.7)	6.6 (43.9)	7.8 (46.0)	9.8 (49.6)	13.0 (55.4)	16.5 (61.7)	19.5 (67.1)	17.3 (63.1)	14.1 (57.4)	9.9 (49.8)	7.5 (45.5)	6.0 (42.8)	12.3 (54.1)
Average precipitation mm (inches)	82.4 (3.24)	82.8 (3.26)	64.7 (2.55)	53.2 (2.09)	40.1 (1.58)	25.7 (1.01)	15.5 (0.61)	27.8 (1.09)	57.0 (2.24)	104.9 (4.13)	85.7 (3.37)	72.2 (2.84)	711.8 (28.02)
Mean monthly sunshine hours	147.8	148.9	203.2	252.1	234.9	280.6	310.3	355.5	319.5	247.0	201.5	145.5	2,748.1
Source: Climatologie mensuelle à la station de Cap Camarat.

== Economy ==
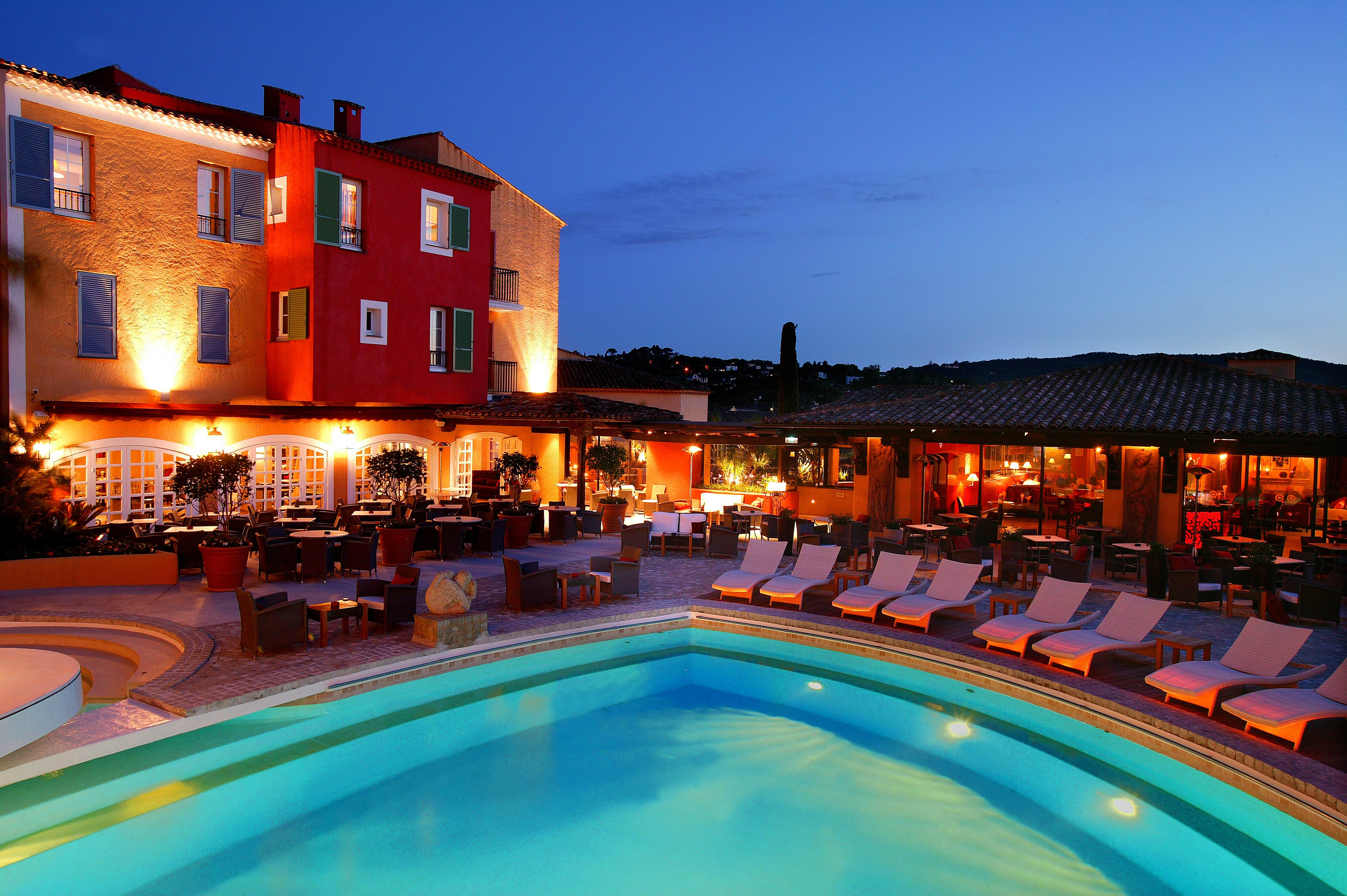
The Hôtel Byblos is a Grand Hotel built in the mid-1960s.

The main economic resource of Saint-Tropez is tourism. The city is well known for the Hôtel Byblos and for Les Caves du Roy, a member of the Leading Hotels of the World; its 1967 inauguration featuring Brigitte Bardot and Gunter Sachs was an international event.

=== Beaches ===
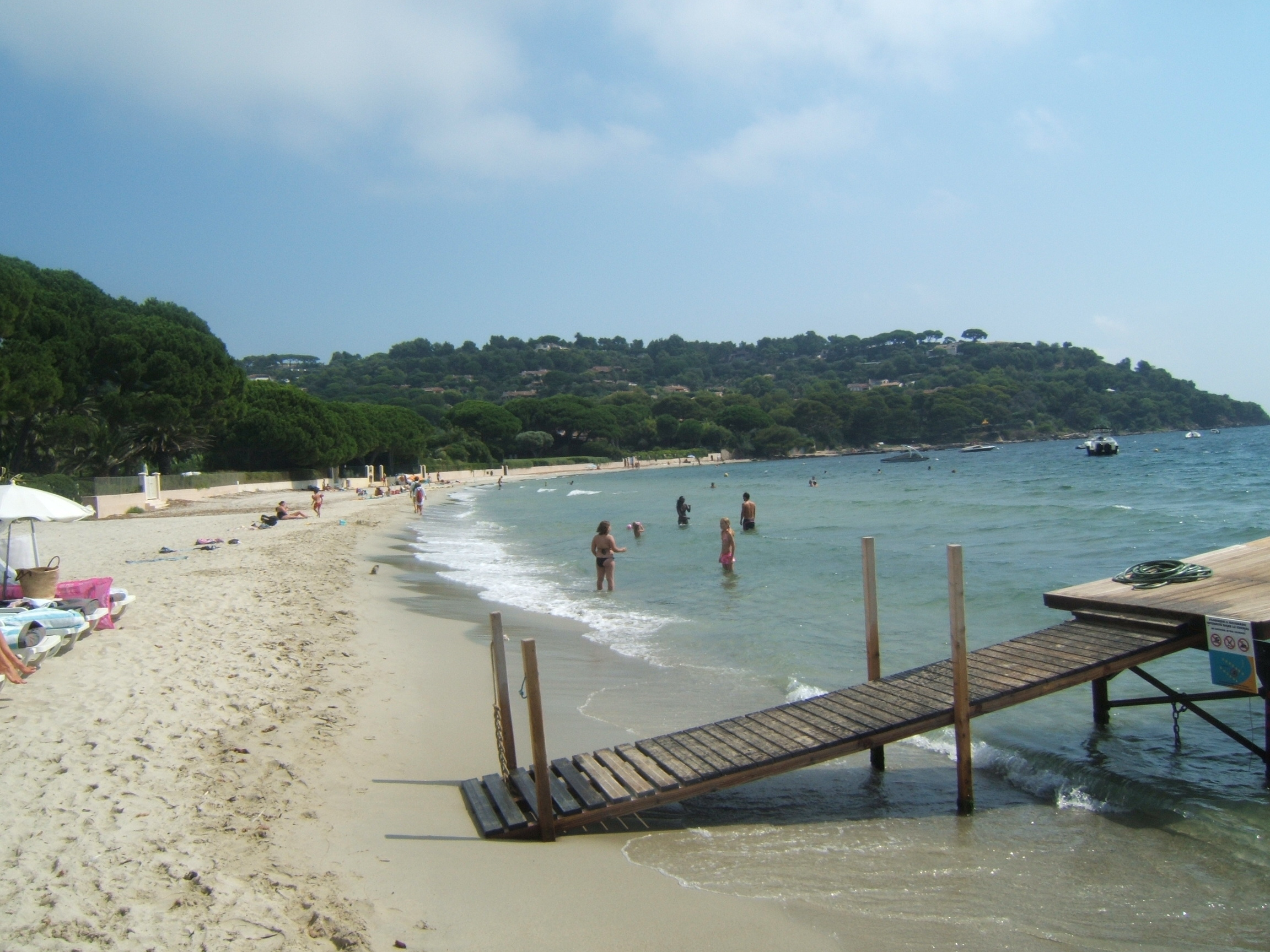
Tahiti beach in 2011

Tropezian beaches are located along the coast in the Baie de Pampelonne, which lies south of Saint-Tropez and east of Ramatuelle. Pampelonne offers a collection of beaches along its five-kilometre shore. Each beach is around 30 metres wide with its own beach hut and private or public tanning area.

Many of the beaches offer windsurfing, sailing and canoeing equipment for rent, while others offer motorized water sports, such as power boats, jet bikes, water skiing and scuba diving. Some of the beaches are naturist beaches. There are also many exclusive beach clubs that are popular among wealthy people from around the world.

==== Beach nudity and the cinema ====
Saint-Tropez's Tahiti Beach, which had been popularised in the film And God Created Woman featuring Brigitte Bardot, emerged as a clothing-optional destination, but the mayor of Saint-Tropez ordered police to ban toplessness and to watch over the beach via helicopter. The "clothing fights" between the gendarmerie and nudists became the main topic of the film Le gendarme de Saint-Tropez (The Troops of St. Tropez) featuring Louis de Funès, which gave rise to The Gendarme comedy film series set in Saint-Tropez. In the end, the nudist side prevailed. Topless sunbathing is now the norm for both men and women from Pampelonne beaches to yachts in the centre of Saint-Tropez port. The Tahiti beach is now clothing-optional, but nudists often head to private nudist beaches, such as that in Cap d'Agde. The films with Brigitte Bardot and Louis de Funès helped to make Saint-Tropez into a famous movie location, and a dedicated cinema museum opened in 2016.

=== Port ===
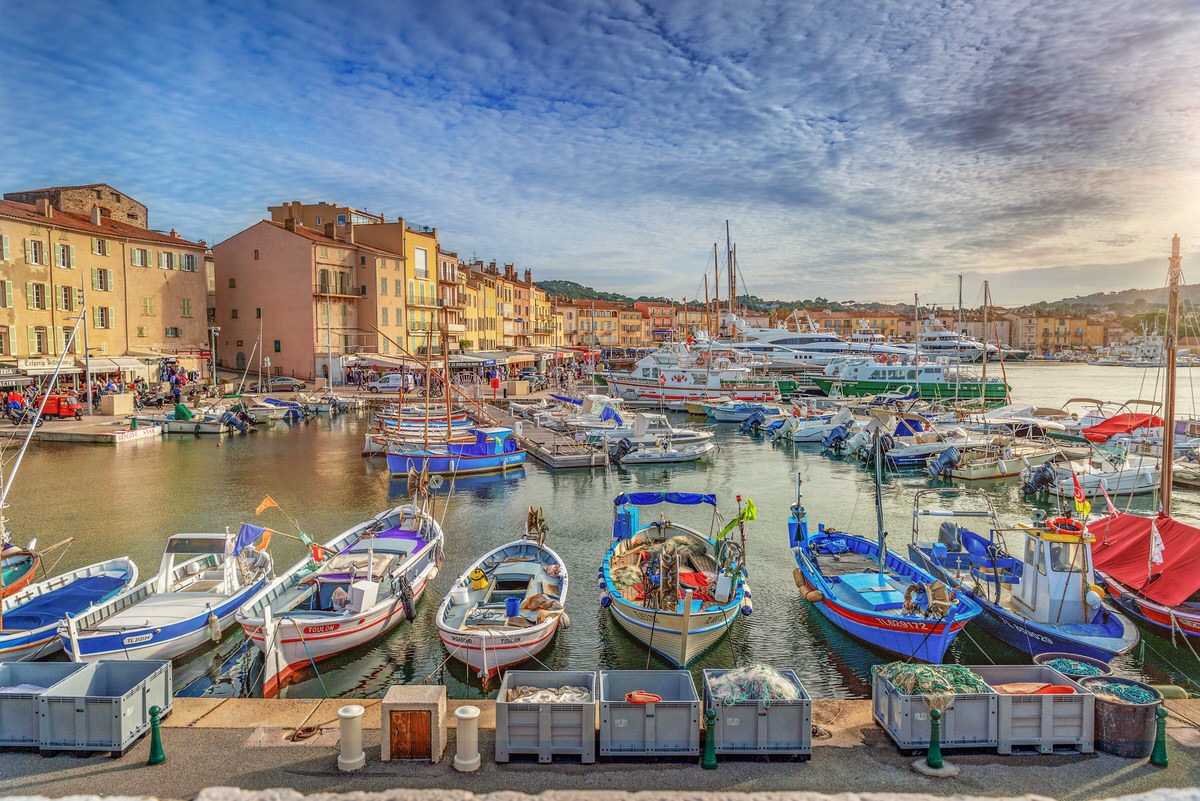
Enhanced color photo of the port of Saint-Tropez

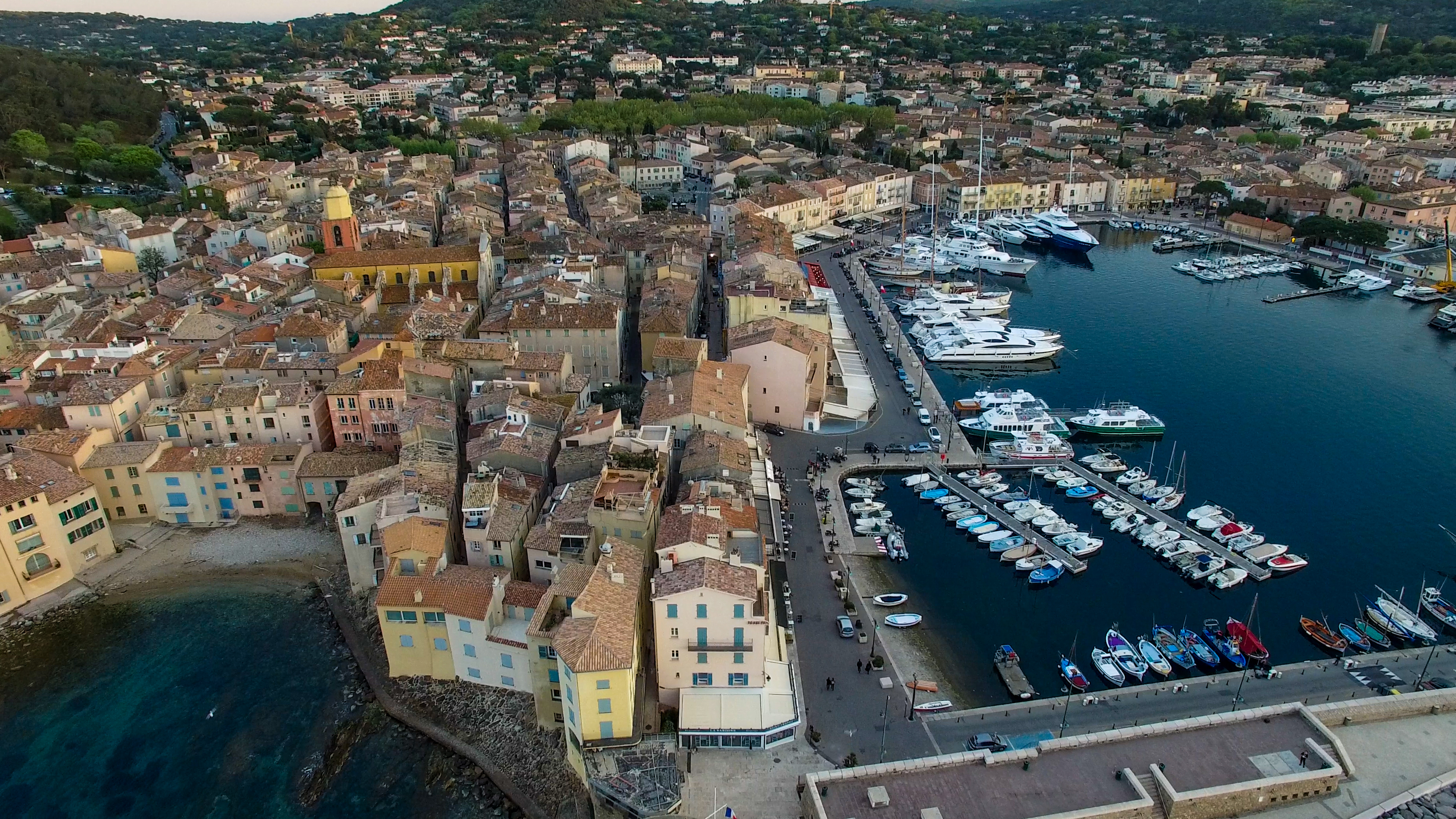
Aerial view of Saint-Tropez

The port was widely used during the 18th century; in 1789 it was visited by 80 ships. Saint-Tropez's shipyards built tartanes and three-masted ships that could carry 1,000 to 12,200 barrels. The town was the site of various associated trades, including fishing, cork, wine and wood. The town had a school of hydrography. In 1860, the flagship of the merchant navy, named The Queen of the Angels (La Reine des Anges, a three-masted ship of 740 barrels capacity), was built at Saint-Tropez.

Its role as a commercial port declined, and it is now primarily a tourist spot and a base for many well-known sail regattas. There is fast boat transportation with Les Bateaux Verts to Sainte-Maxime on the other side of the bay and to Port Grimaud, Marines de Cogolin, Les Issambres and St-Aygulf.

=== Events ===
==== Les Bravades de Saint-Tropez ====
Les Bravades de Saint-Tropez is an annual celebration held in the middle of May when people of the town celebrate their patron saint, Torpes of Pisa, and their military achievements. One of the oldest traditions of Provence, it has been held for more than 450 years since the citizens of Saint-Tropez were first given special permission to form a militia to protect the town from the Barbary pirates. During the three-day celebration, the various militias in costumes of the time fire their muskets into the air at traditional stops, march to the sound of bands and parade St. Torpes's bust. The townspeople also attend a mass wearing traditional Provençal costume.

==== Les Voiles de Saint-Tropez ====
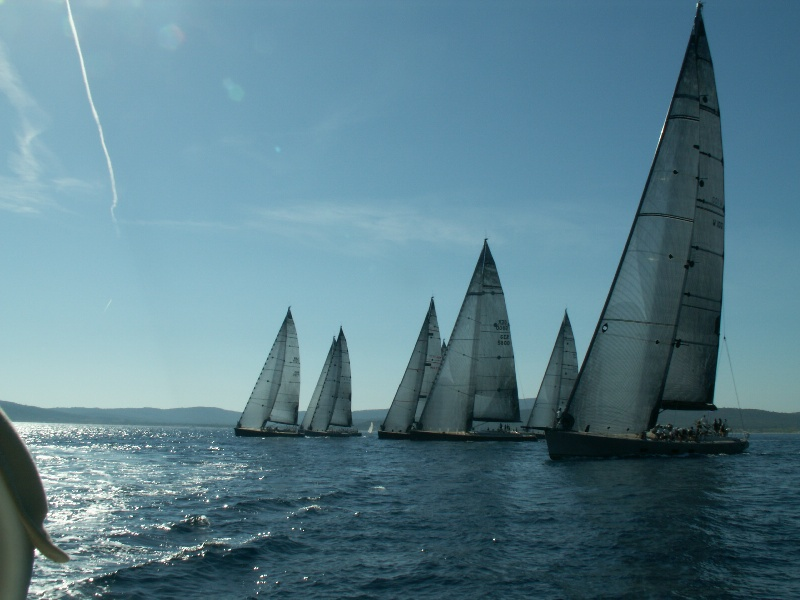
Les Voiles de Saint-Tropez

Each year, at the end of September, a regatta is held in the bay of Saint-Tropez, Les Voiles de Saint-Tropez. Many yachts are entered, some as long as 50 metres, and many tourists come for this event.

== Traditional dishes ==
The Tarte tropézienne is a traditional cake invented by a Polish confectioner who had set up shop in Saint-Tropez in the mid-1950s, and made famous by actress Brigitte Bardot.

== Demographics ==
Historical population

Year	Pop.	±% p.a.
1793	3,629	—
1800	3,156	−1.98%
1806	3,319	+0.84%
1821	3,360	+0.08%
1831	3,736	+1.07%
1836	3,637	−0.54%
1841	3,538	−0.55%
1846	3,647	+0.61%
1851	3,595	−0.29%
1856	3,640	+0.25%
1861	3,558	−0.45%
1866	3,739	+1.00%
1872	3,532	−0.94%
1876	3,531	−0.01%
1881	3,545	+0.08%
1886	3,636	+0.51%
1891	3,533	−0.57%
1896	3,599	+0.37%
1901	3,704	+0.58%

Year	Pop.	±% p.a.
1906	3,708	+0.02%
1911	3,704	−0.02%
1921	3,842	+0.37%
1926	4,324	+2.39%
1931	4,589	+1.20%
1936	4,102	−2.22%
1946	4,161	+0.14%
1954	4,925	+2.13%
1962	5,668	+1.77%
1968	6,130	+1.31%
1975	5,427	−1.73%
1982	6,213	+1.95%
1990	5,754	−0.95%
1999	5,444	−0.61%
2007	5,640	+0.44%
2012	4,452	−4.62%
2017	4,352	−0.45%
2023	3,582	−3.19%

Source: EHESS and INSEE

== Infrastructure ==
=== Transport to and from Saint-Tropez ===
By sea

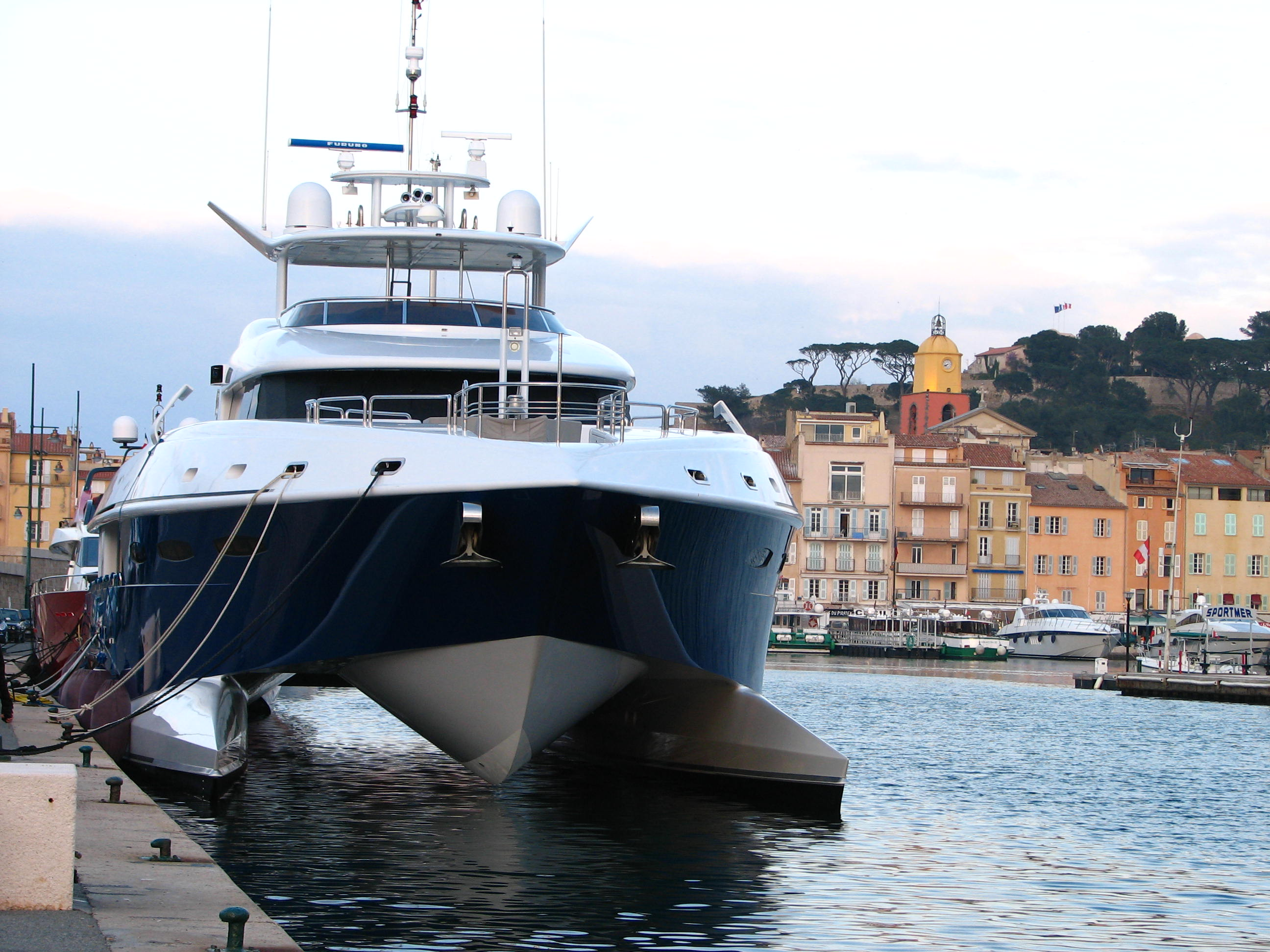
Large catamaran yacht at a marina in Saint-Tropez

The 800-berth port with two marinas hosts boats, including ferries. In the summer season, there is a ferry service between St-Tropez and Nice, Sainte-Maxime, Cannes, Saint-Raphaël. Private yachts may also be chartered.

By air

There is no airport in Saint-Tropez, but there is a charter service to and from clubs, the town and local beaches by helicopter. The nearest airports are La Môle – Saint-Tropez Airport located in La Môle, 15 km (9 mi) southwest of Saint-Tropez, and Toulon–Hyères Airport located 52 km (32 mi) southwest of Saint-Tropez. Major nearby airports are Nice Côte d'Azur Airport located 95 km (59 mi) from Saint-Tropez, and Marseille Provence Airport located 158 km (98 mi) from Saint-Tropez.

By land

There is no rail station in Saint-Tropez. The nearest station is Saint-Raphaël-Valescure, located in Saint-Raphaël (39 km (24 mi) from Saint-Tropez), which also offers a boat service to Saint-Tropez. There is also direct bus service to Saint-Tropez, and the rail station is connected with bus station.

There is a bus station in Saint-Tropez called the Gare routière de Saint-Tropez, located in Place Blanqui. It is operated by Var department transport division Varlib, which employs other transport companies to operate routes.

There are taxi services, including from Nice airport to Saint-Tropez, but they are expensive because of the long distances and the area's wealth.

In the tourist season, traffic problems may be expected on roads to Saint-Tropez, so the fastest way to travel is by scooter or bike. There is no direct highway to the village. There are three main roads to Saint-Tropez:

- Via the A8 (E80) with the sign "Draguignan, Le Muy-Golfe de Saint-Tropez" – RD 25 Sainte-Maxime, 19 km (12 mi) -> on the former RN 98 – 12 km (7 mi).
- A57 with the sign "The Cannet des Maures" -> DR 558, 24 km (15 mi) Grimaud until then by the RD 61 – 9 km (6 mi) through the famous intersection of La Foux.
- Near the sea, the former RN 98 connects to Toulon-La Valette-du-Var, Saint-Raphaël, Cannes, Nice, Monaco, DR 93, called "Beach Road", with destinations to Pampelonne, Ramatuelle and La Croix – Valmer.

=== Town transport ===
Public transport in Saint-Tropez includes minibuses, providing shuttle service between town and Pampelonne beaches.

Other means of transport include scooters, cars, bicycles and taxis. There are also helicopter services and boat trips.

Because of traffic and short distances, walking is an obvious choice for trips around town and to the Tropezian beaches.

== Culture, education and sport ==
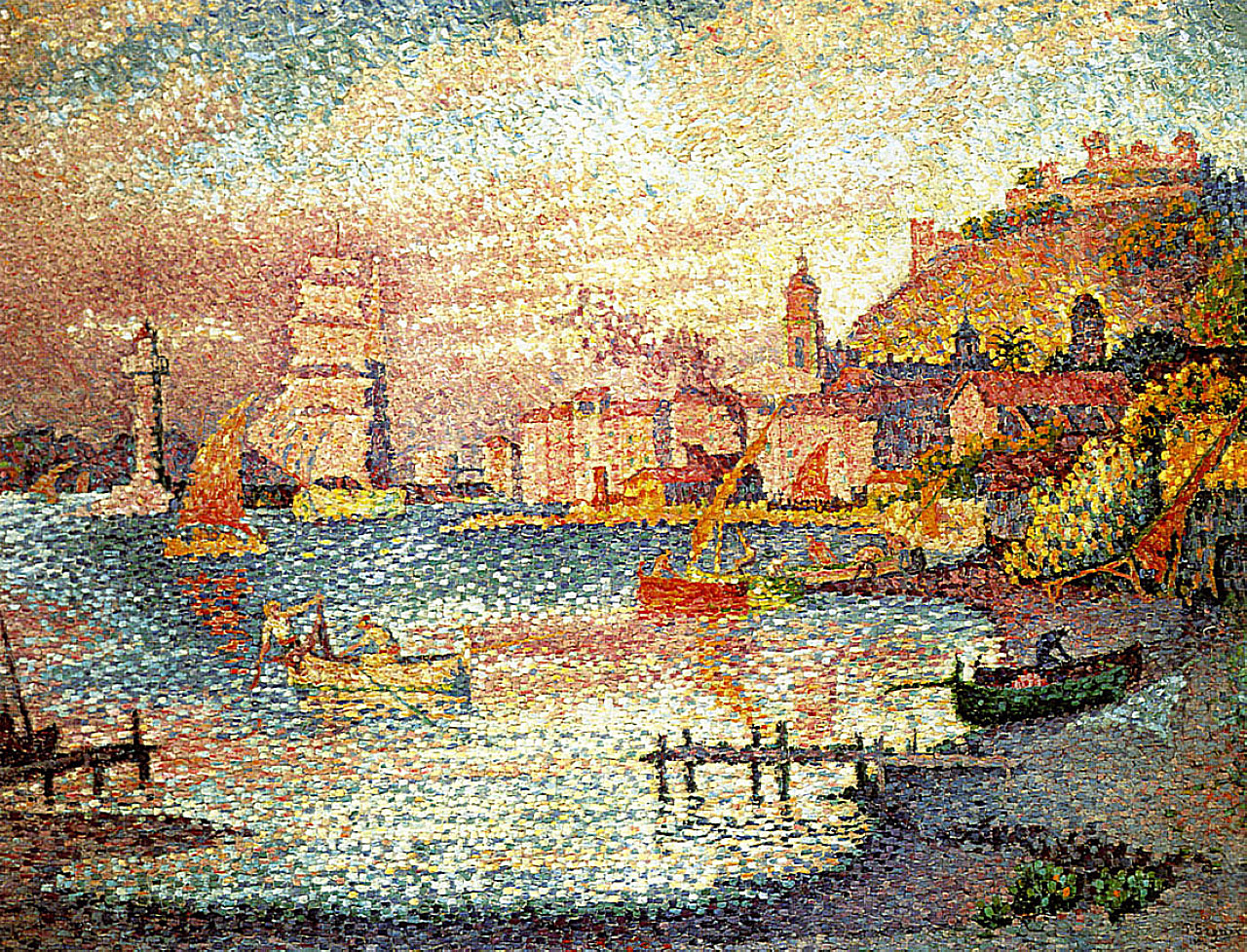
Paul Signac, Leaving the port of Saint-Tropez (1901)

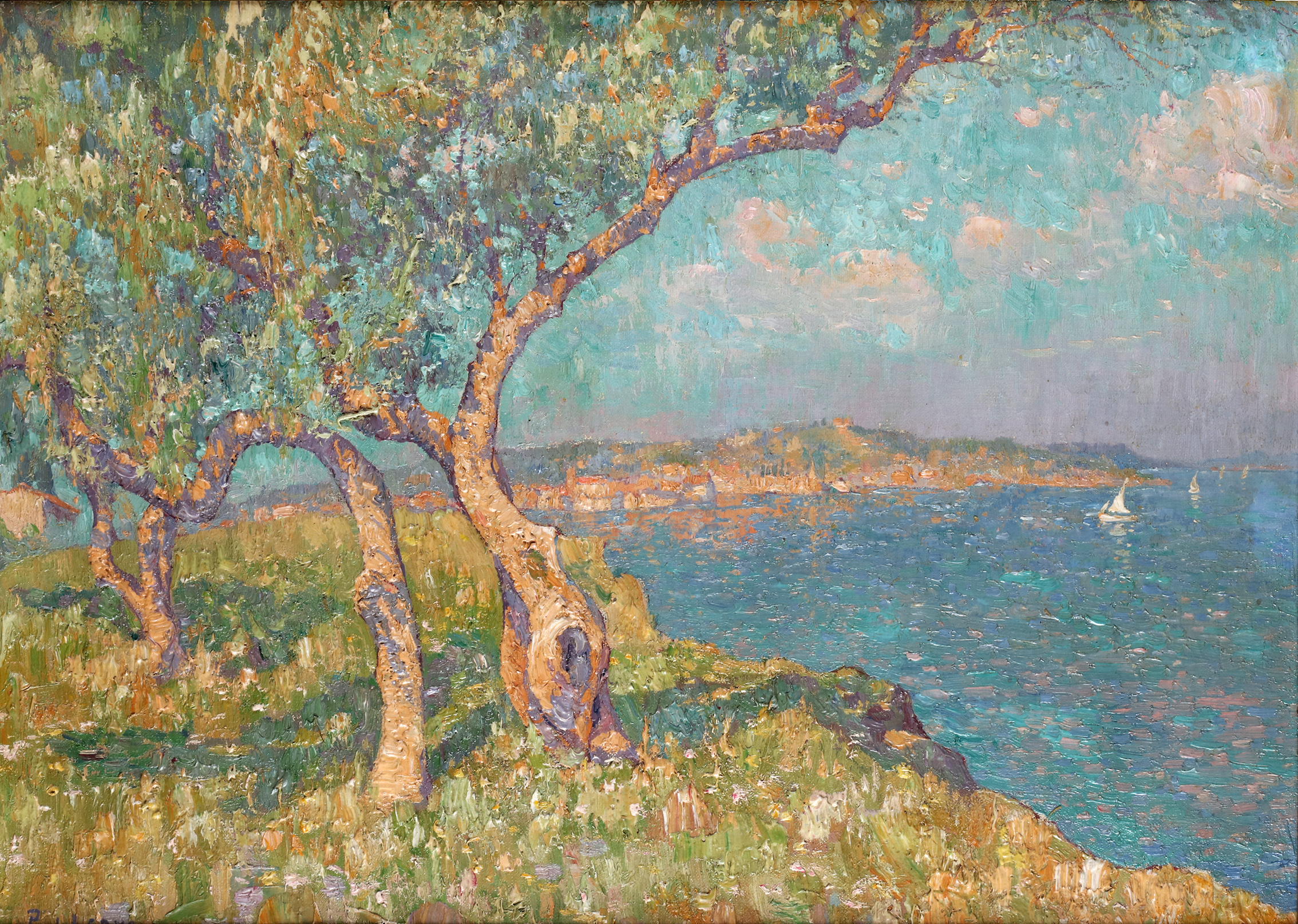
A panoramic view of Saint-Tropez by Paul Leduc (1876–1943)

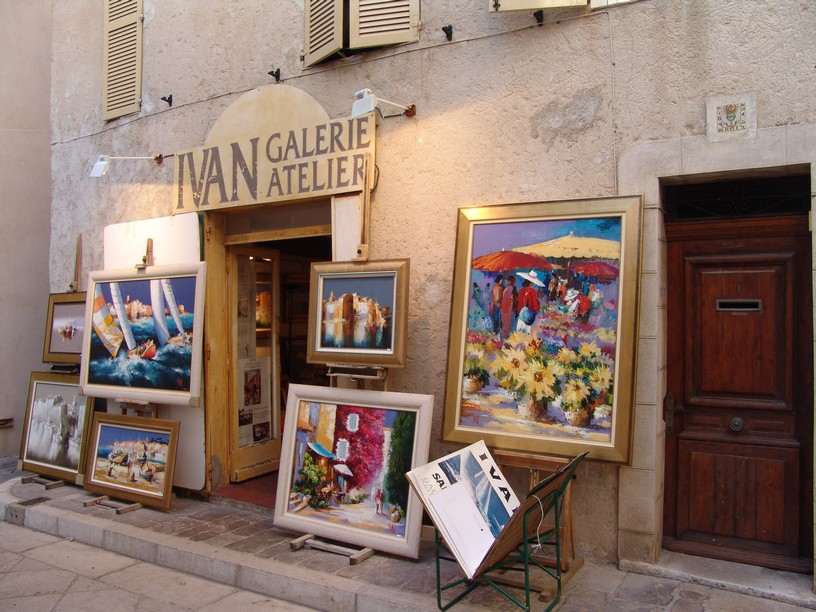
Paintings Galerie Ivan

The town has health facilities, a cinema, a library, an outdoor center and a recreation center for youth.

Schools include: École maternelle (kindergarten – preschool) – l'Escouleto, écoles primaires (primary schools – primary education): Louis Blanc and Les Lauriers, collège d'enseignement secondaire (secondary school, high school – secondary education) – Moulin Blanc.

There are more than 1,000 students distributed among kindergartens, primary schools and one high school. In 2011, there were 275 students in high school and 51 people employed there, of whom 23 were teachers.

=== Art ===
Saint-Tropez plays a major role in the history of modern art. Paul Signac discovered this light-filled place that then inspired painters such as Matisse, Pierre Bonnard, and Albert Marquet to come to Saint-Tropez. The painting styles of pointillism and fauvism emerged in Saint-Tropez. Saint-Tropez was also attractive for the next generation of painters: Bernard Buffet, David Hockney, Massimo Campigli. and Donald Sultan have lived and worked there. Today, Stefan Szczesny continues this tradition.

The contemporary artist Philippe Shangti imagined the design of Le Quai and L'Opéra, restaurants located on the port of Saint-Tropez where he also exhibits his art collections. Centered on a specific theme, he always denounces different problems affecting society with provocative artworks.

== International relations ==
Saint-Tropez is twinned with:

- Vittoriosa, Malta

== Famous people connected with Saint-Tropez ==
Saint Torpes of Pisa

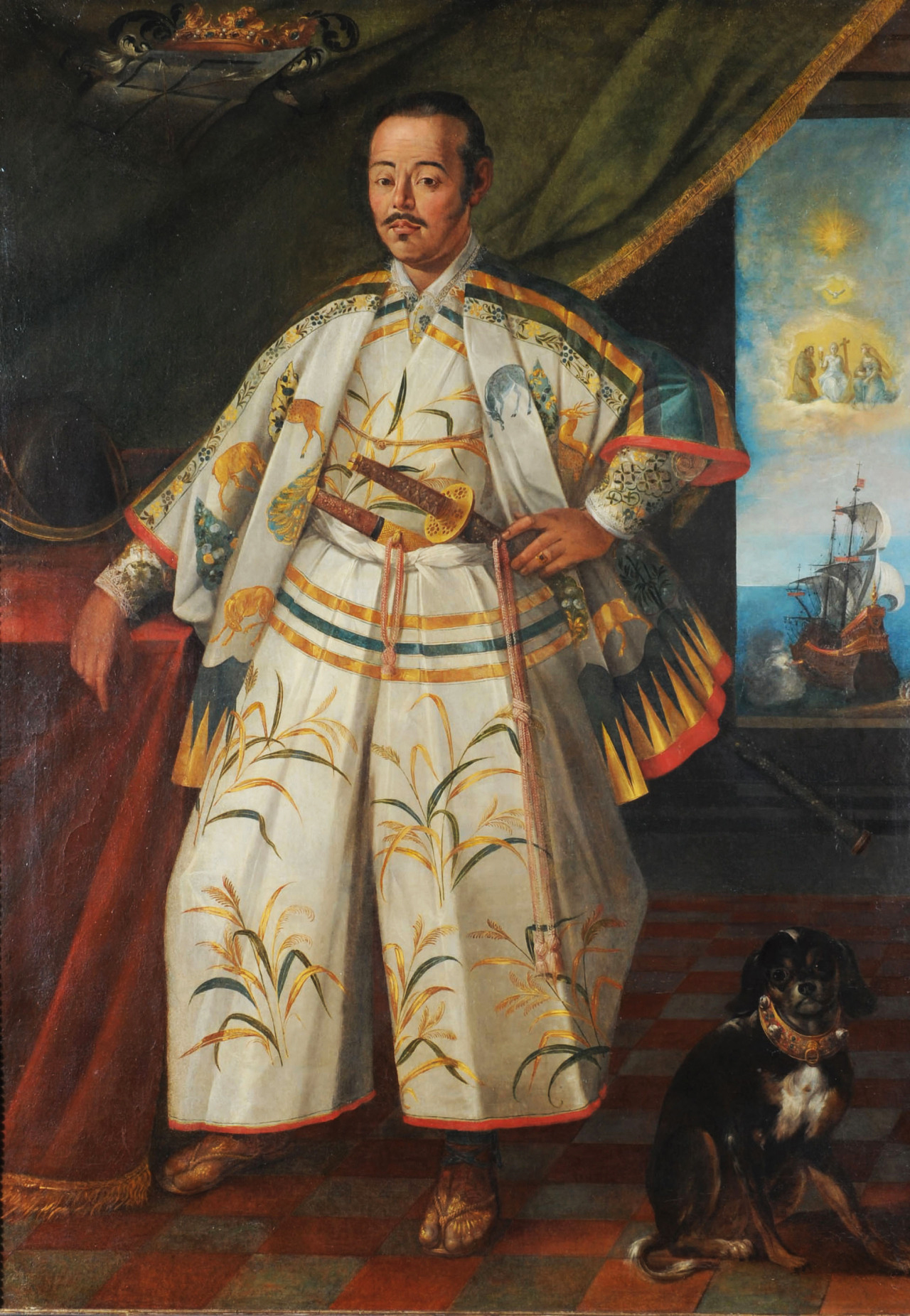
Portrait of Hasekura Tsunenaga

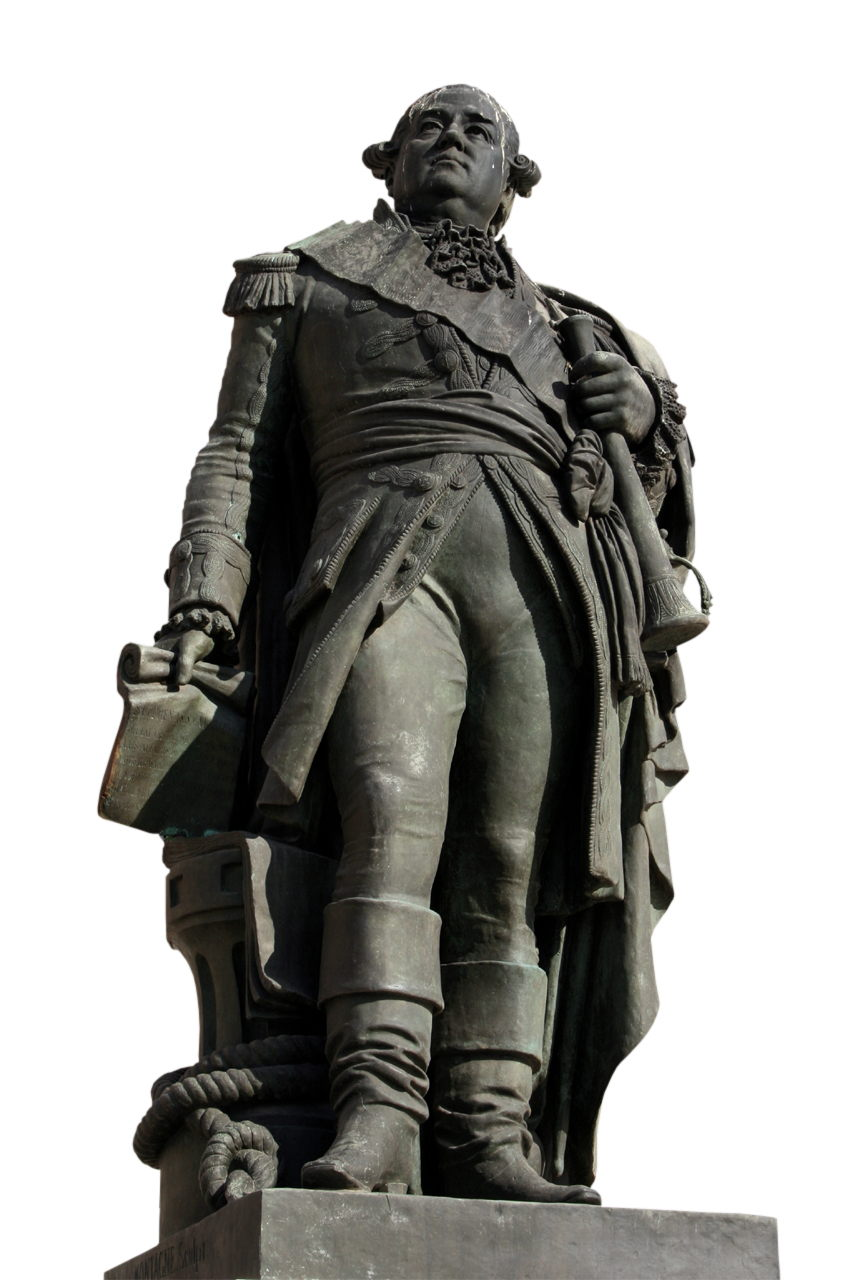
Statue of Admiral de Suffren de Saint-Tropez

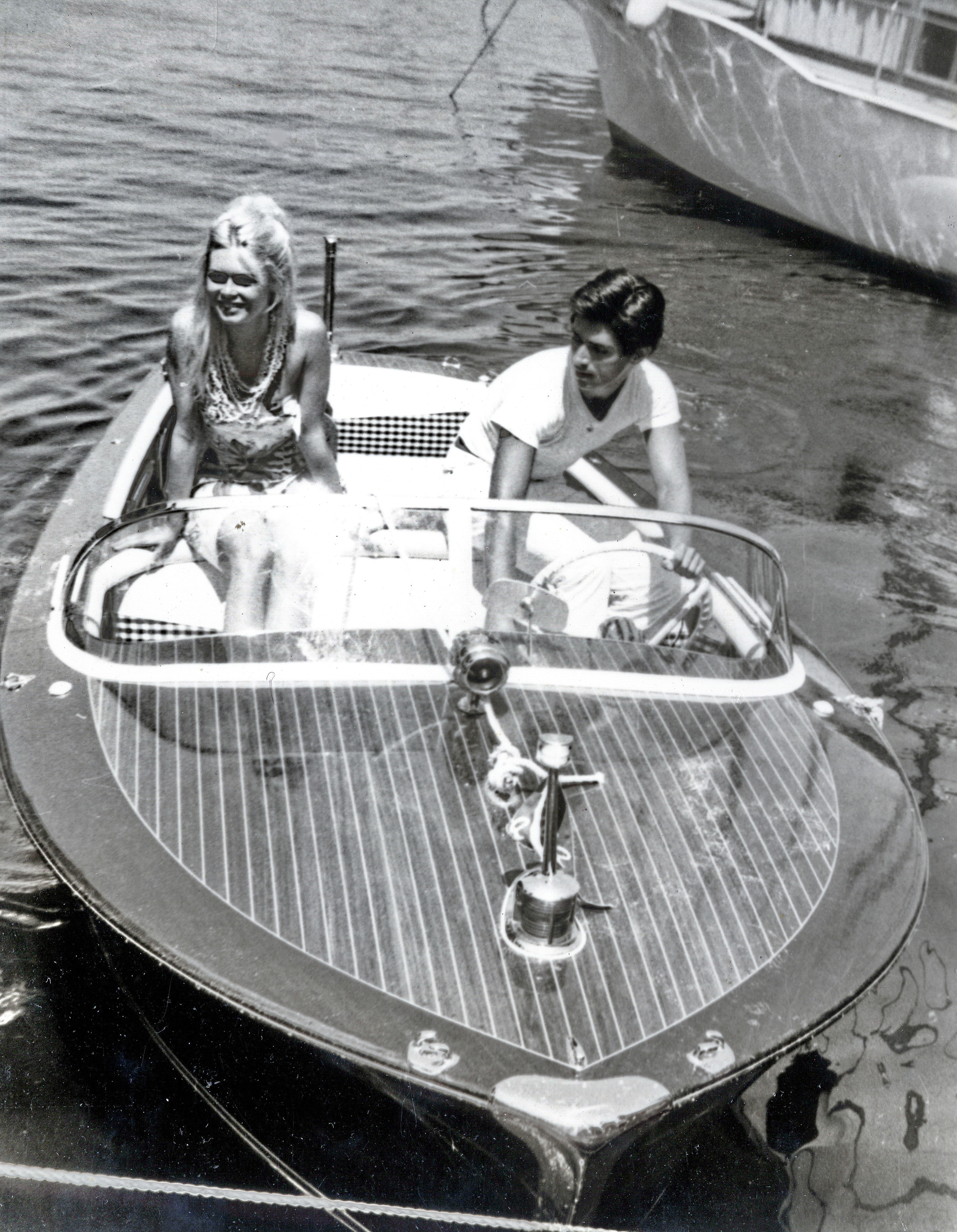
Brigitte Bardot at Saint-Tropez (1963)

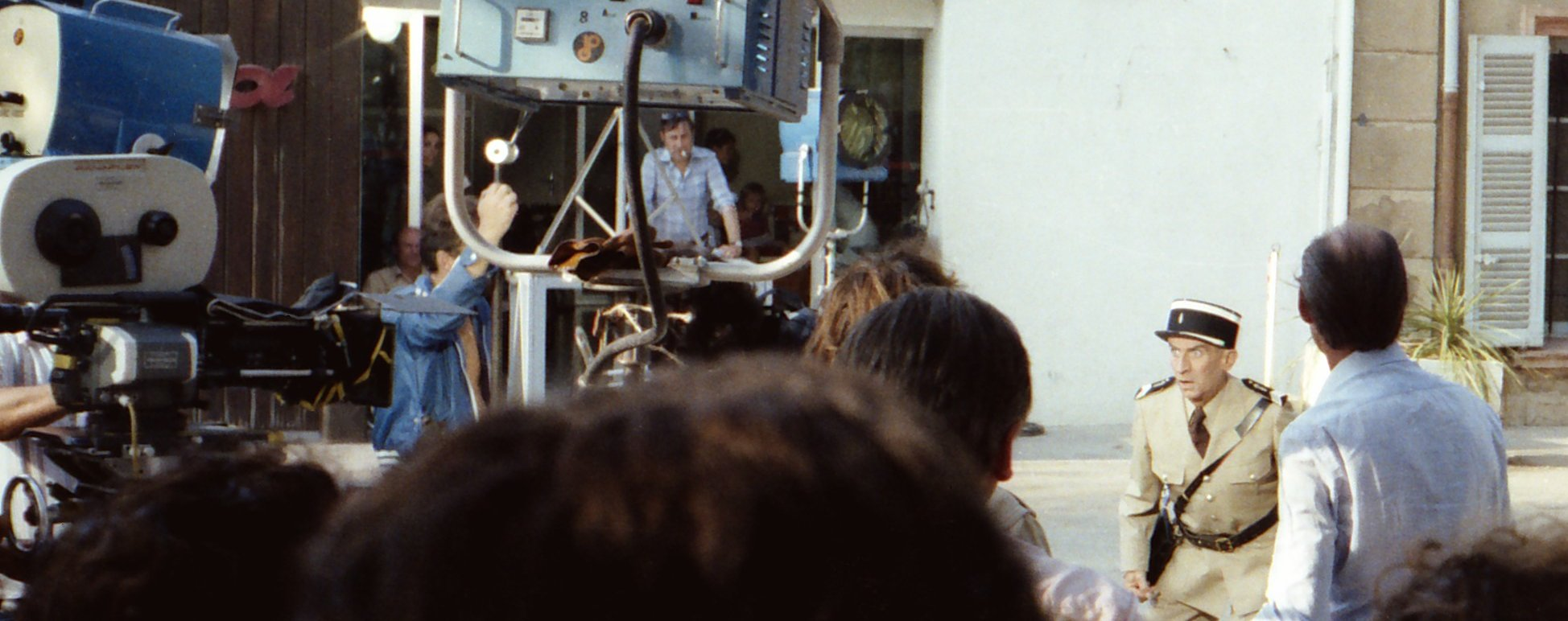
Louis de Funès during filming

The most famous persons connected with Saint-Tropez include the semi-legendary martyr who gave his name to the town, Saint Torpes of Pisa; Hasekura Tsunenaga, probably the first Japanese in Europe, who landed in Saint-Tropez in 1615; a hero of the American Revolutionary War, Admiral Pierre André de Suffren de Saint-Tropez; the icon of modern Saint-Tropez, Brigitte Bardot, who started the clothes-optional revolution and lived in the Saint-Tropez area until her death in 2025; Louis de Funès, who played the character of the gendarme (police officer) in the French comedy film series Le Gendarme de Saint-Tropez and also helped establish the international image of Saint-Tropez as both a quiet town and a modern jet-set holiday target.

== In popular culture ==
The English rock band Pink Floyd wrote a song "San Tropez" after the town. Saint-Tropez was also mentioned in David Gates's 1978 hit "Took the Last Train", Kraftwerk's "Tour de France", Aerosmith's "Permanent Vacation", Taylor Swift's "The Man", and Beyoncé's "Energy". Rappers including Diddy, Jay-Z, 50 Cent, J. Cole, and Post Malone refer to the city in some of their songs as a favorite vacation destination, usually reached by yacht. DJ Antoine wrote a song "Welcome to St. Tropez". The Tony Award-winning Broadway musical La Cage aux Folles is set in a drag night club in Saint-Tropez. Furthermore, Bulgarian singer Azis wrote a song named "Sen Trope" ("Сен Тропе"). Saint-Tropez was also mentioned in Army of Lovers' song "My Army of Lovers." Their song "La Plage de Saint Tropez" was also dedicated to this town. On J. Cole's album 2014 Forest Hills Drive (2014), there is a track named St. Tropez. Italian singer Annalisa also has a song titled "La crisi a Saint-Tropez".

== Gallery ==
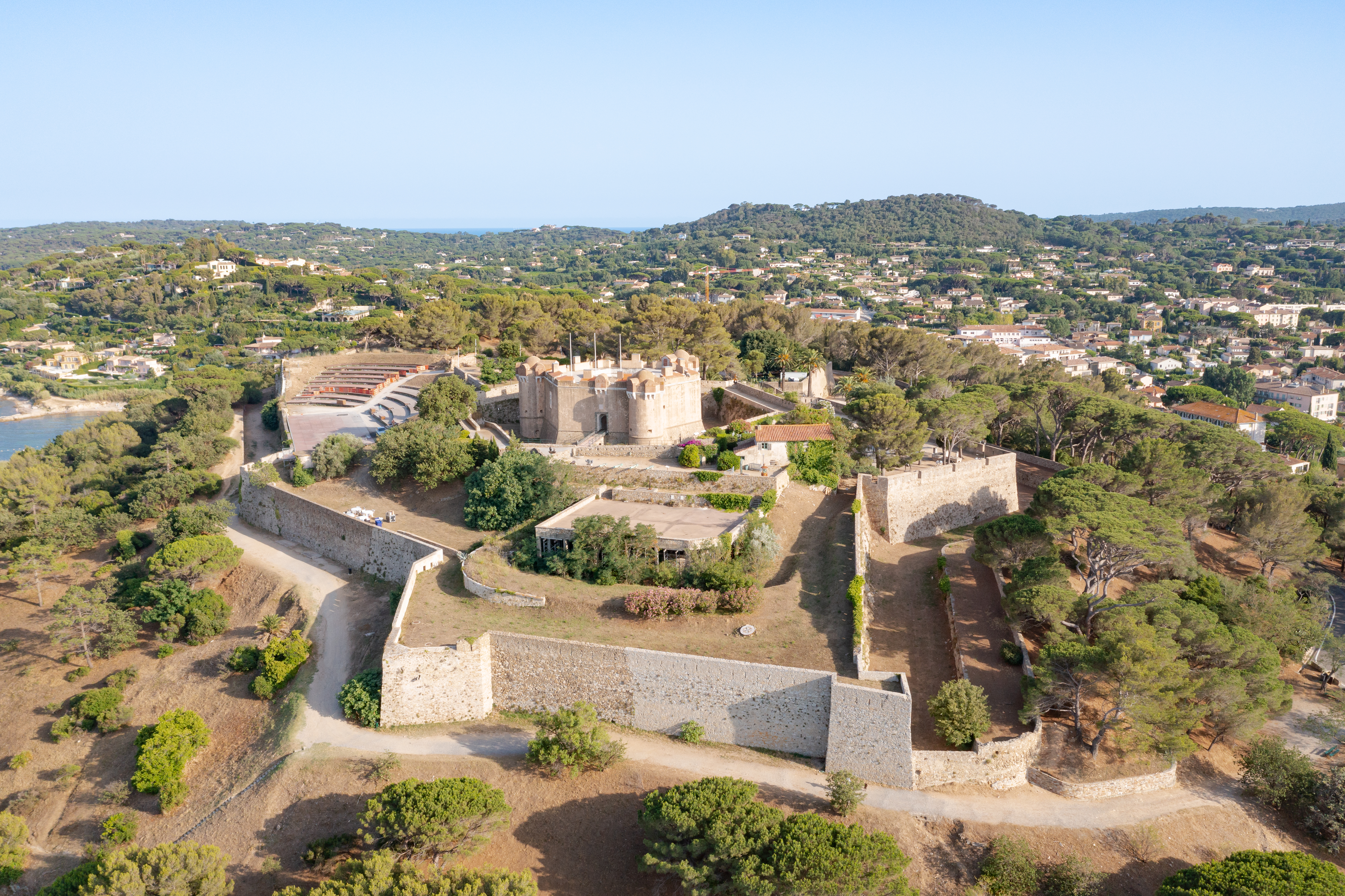
Aerial view of the Cital of Saint-Tropez

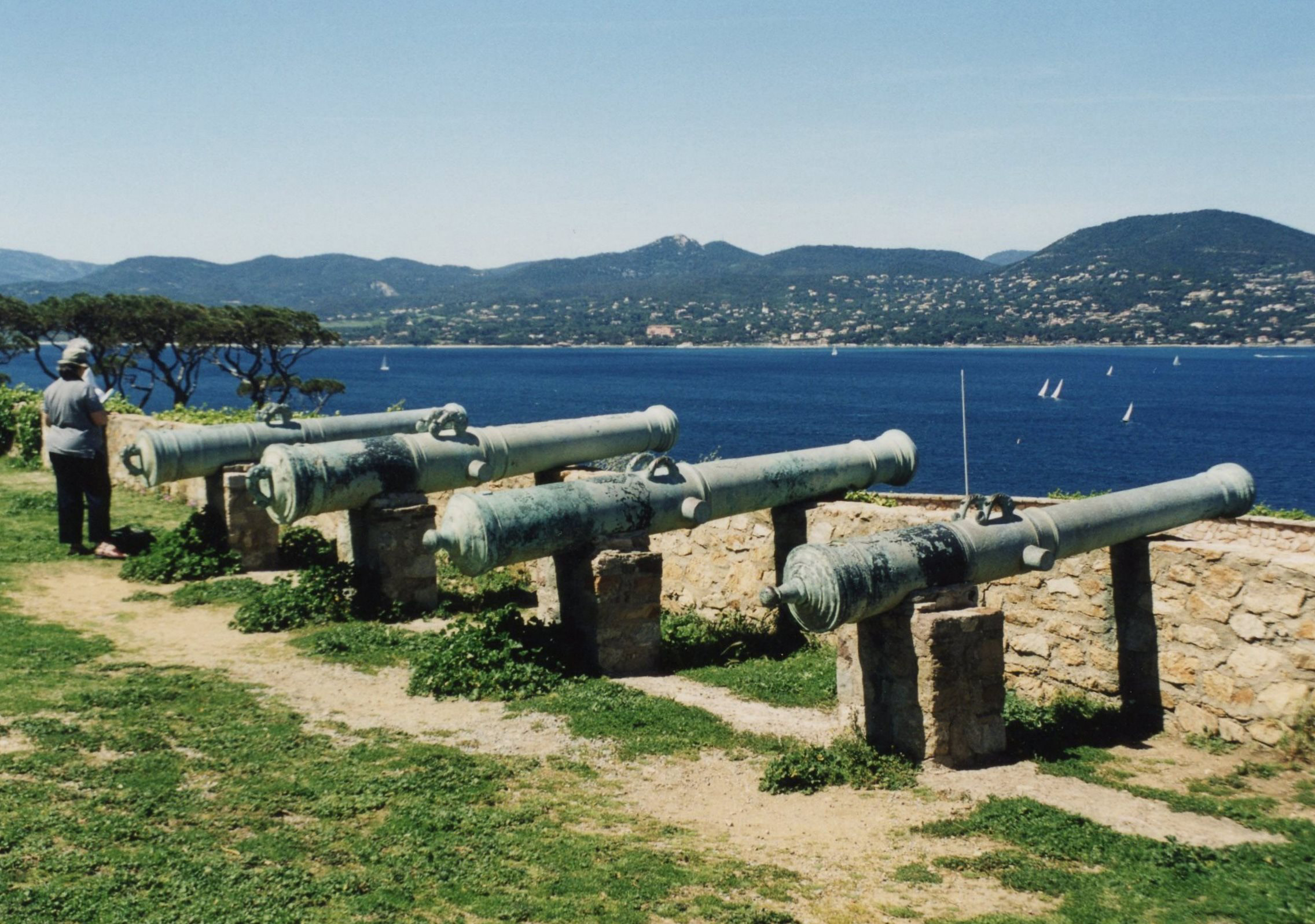
Cannons of the Citadel

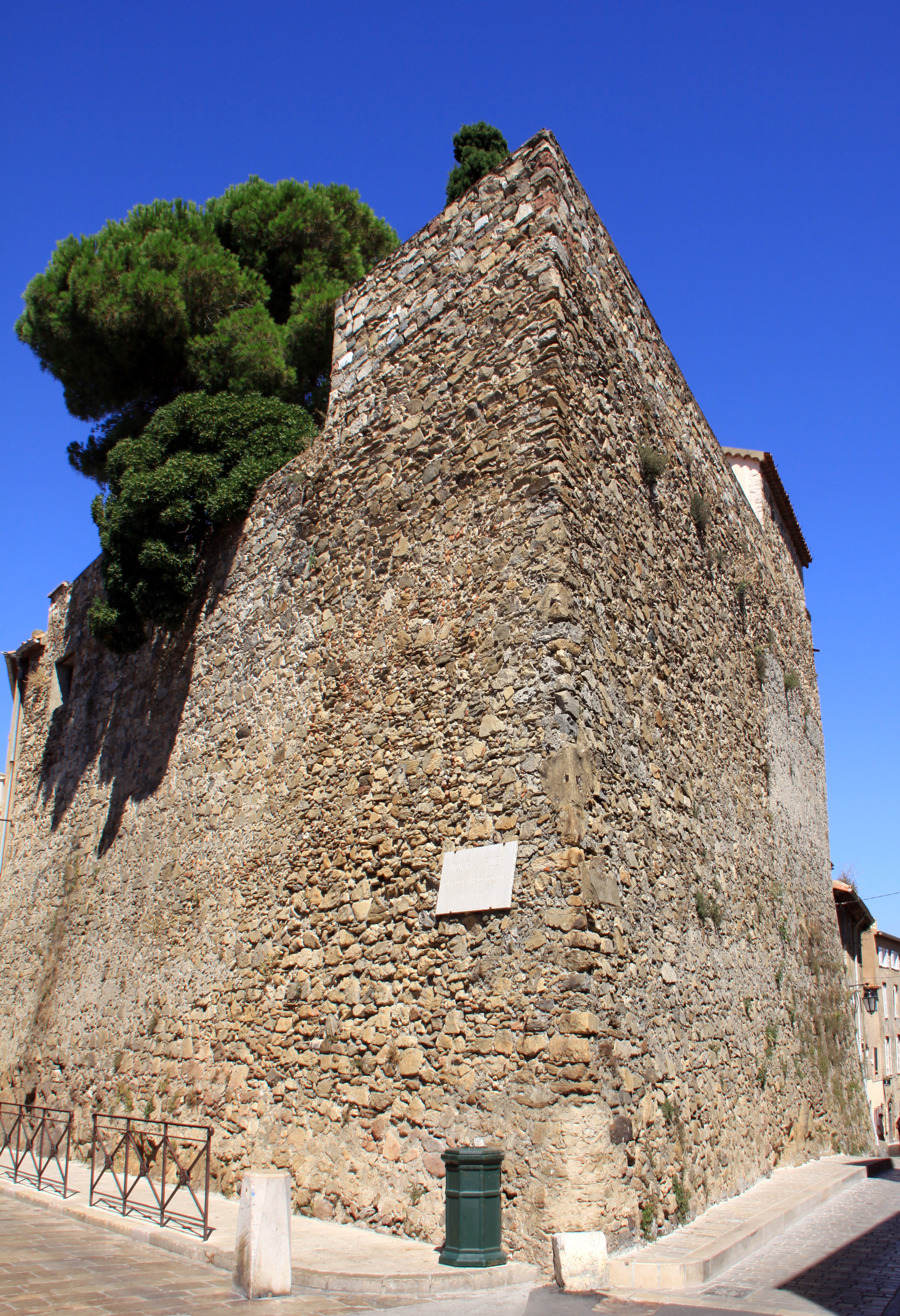
Tour Jarlier

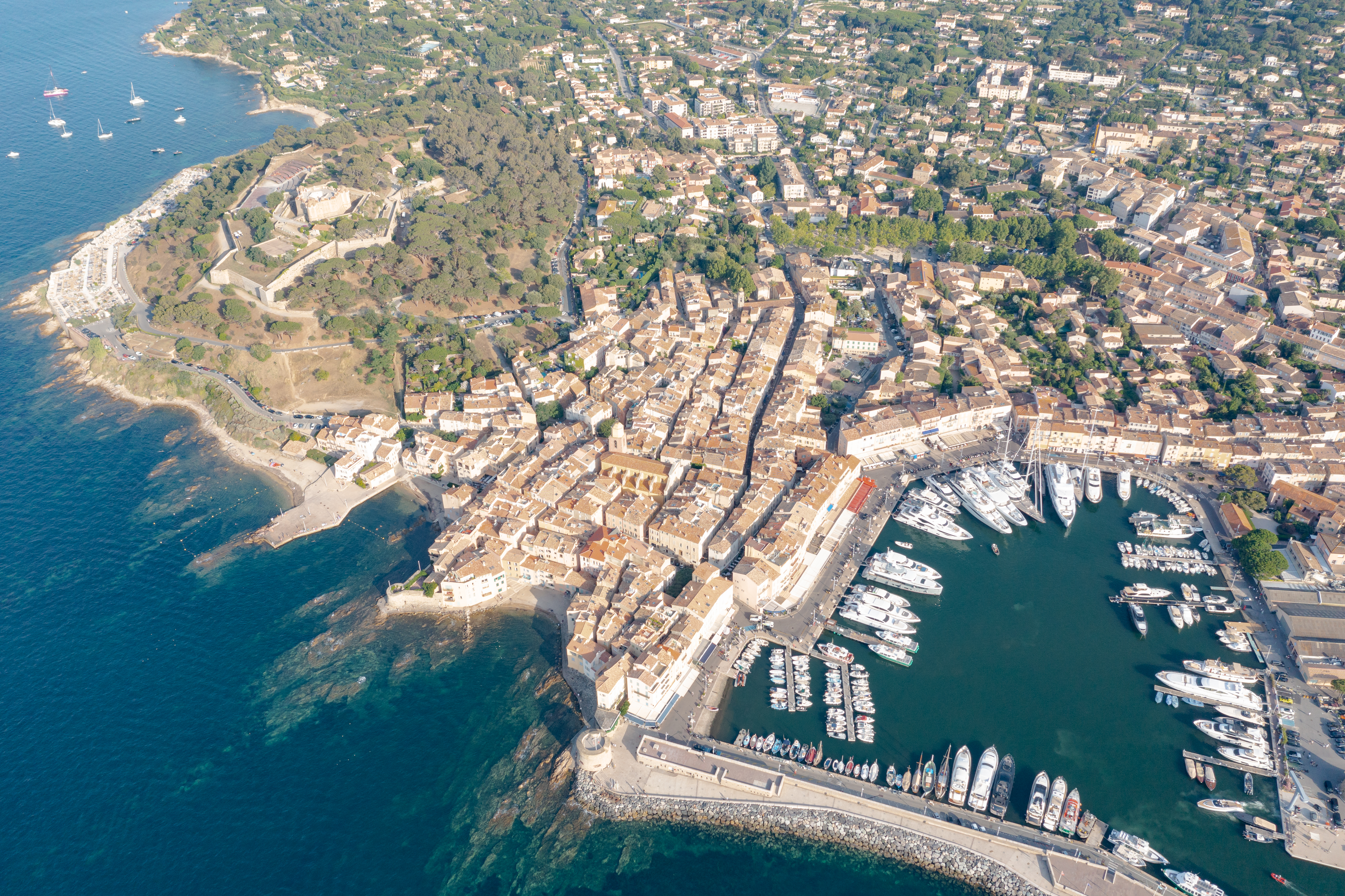
Aerial view of the old town and the old port of Saint-Tropez

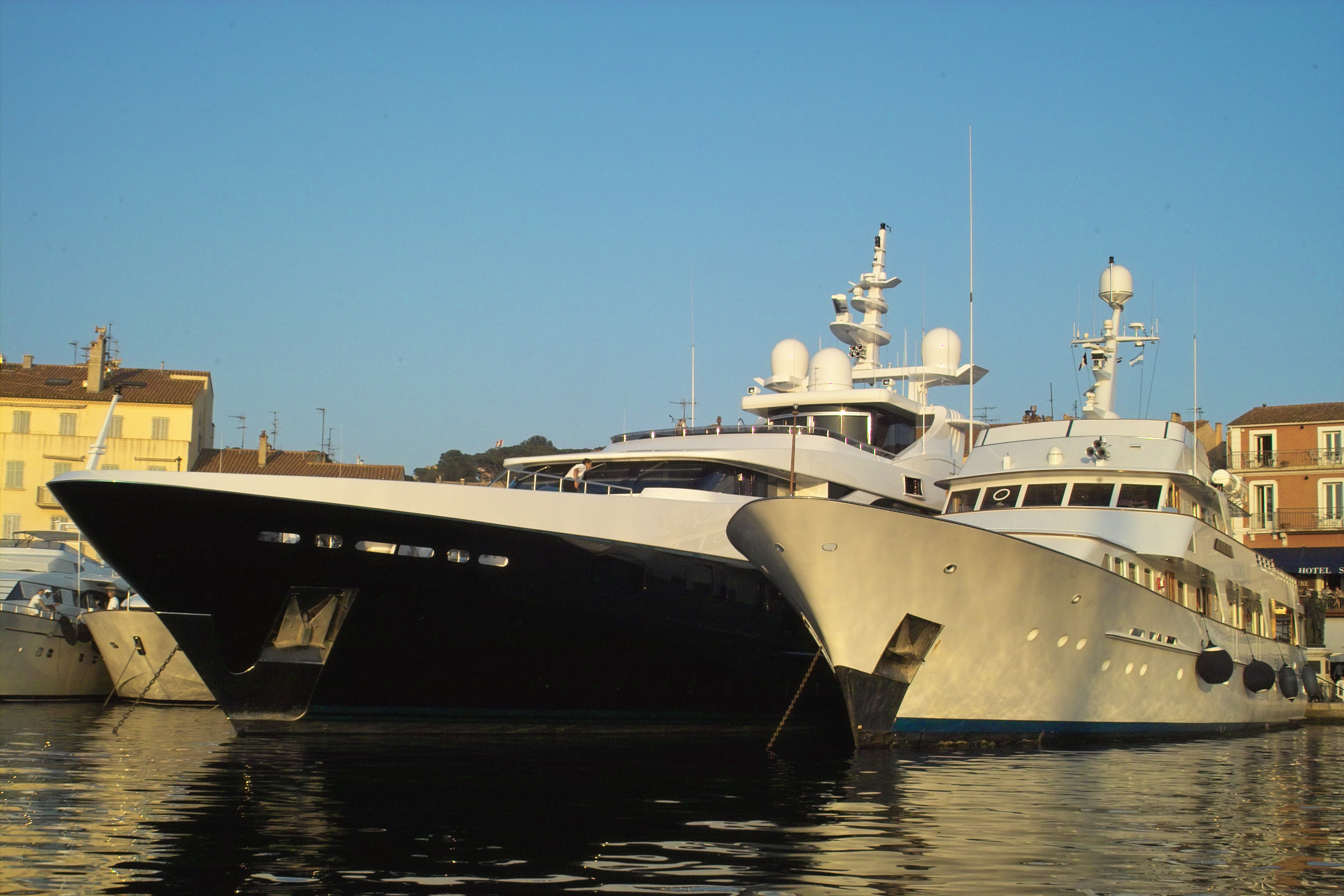
Luxury yachts

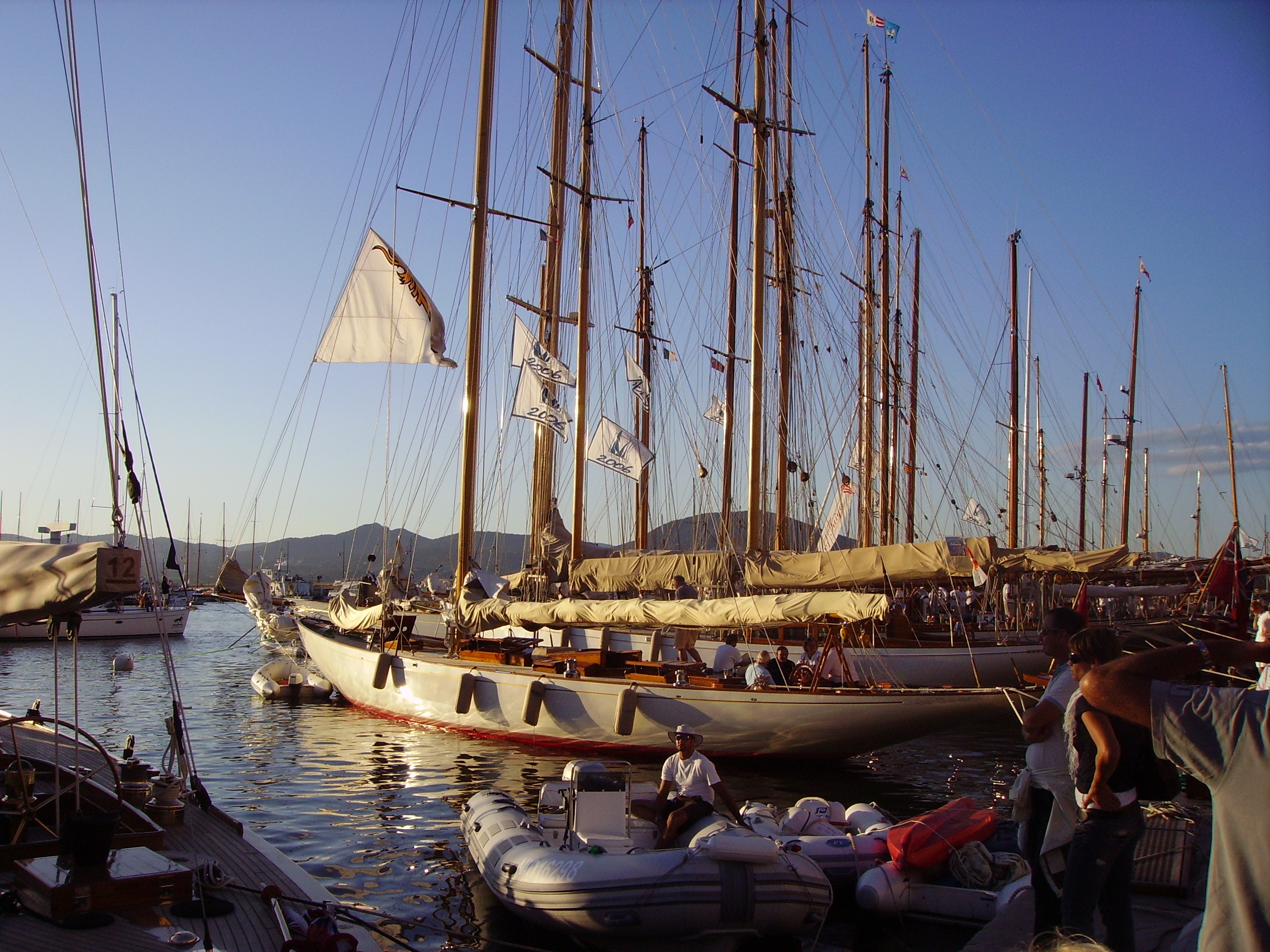
Sailing yachts

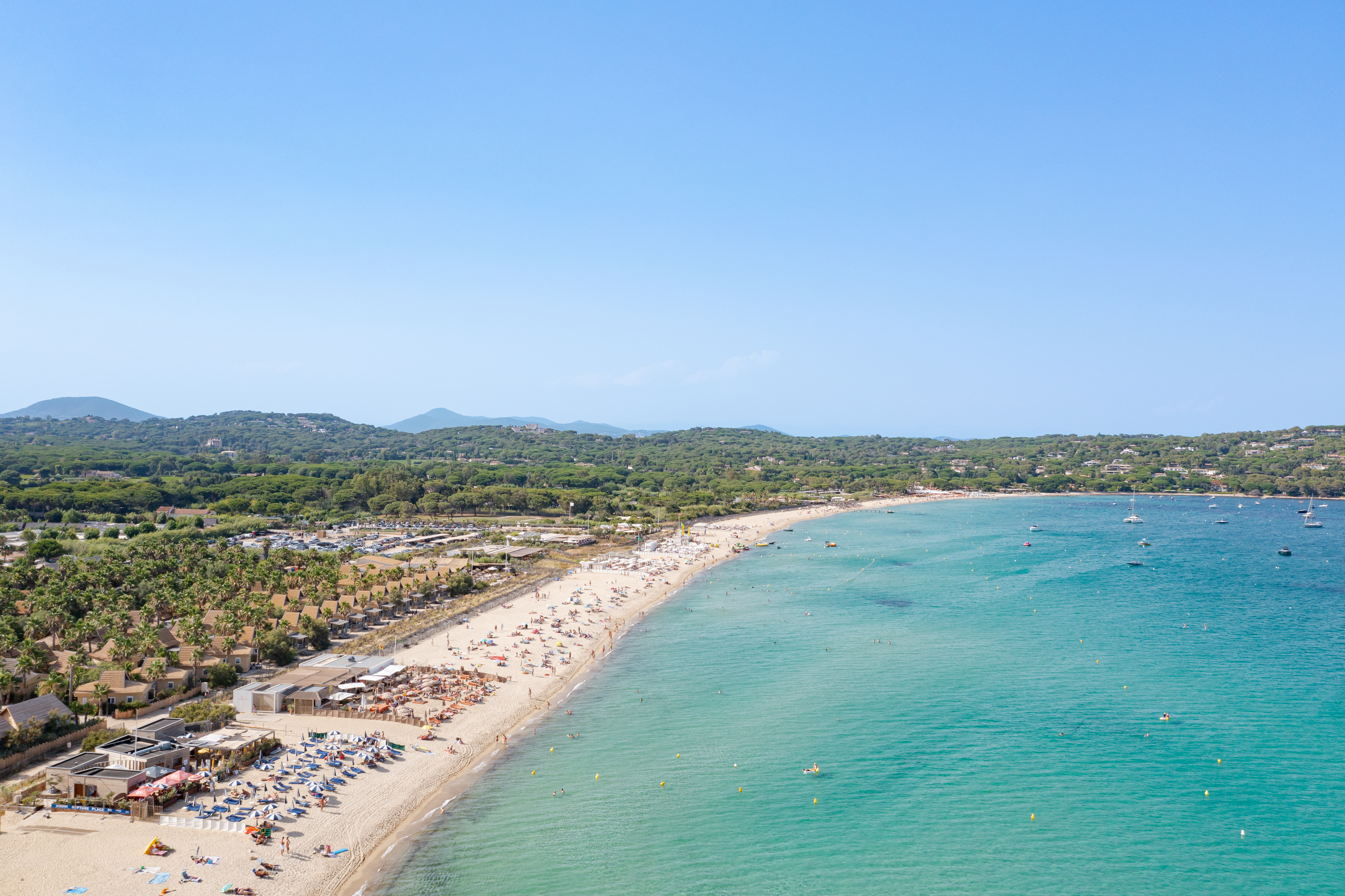
Aerial view of Pampelonne Beach, Saint-Tropez

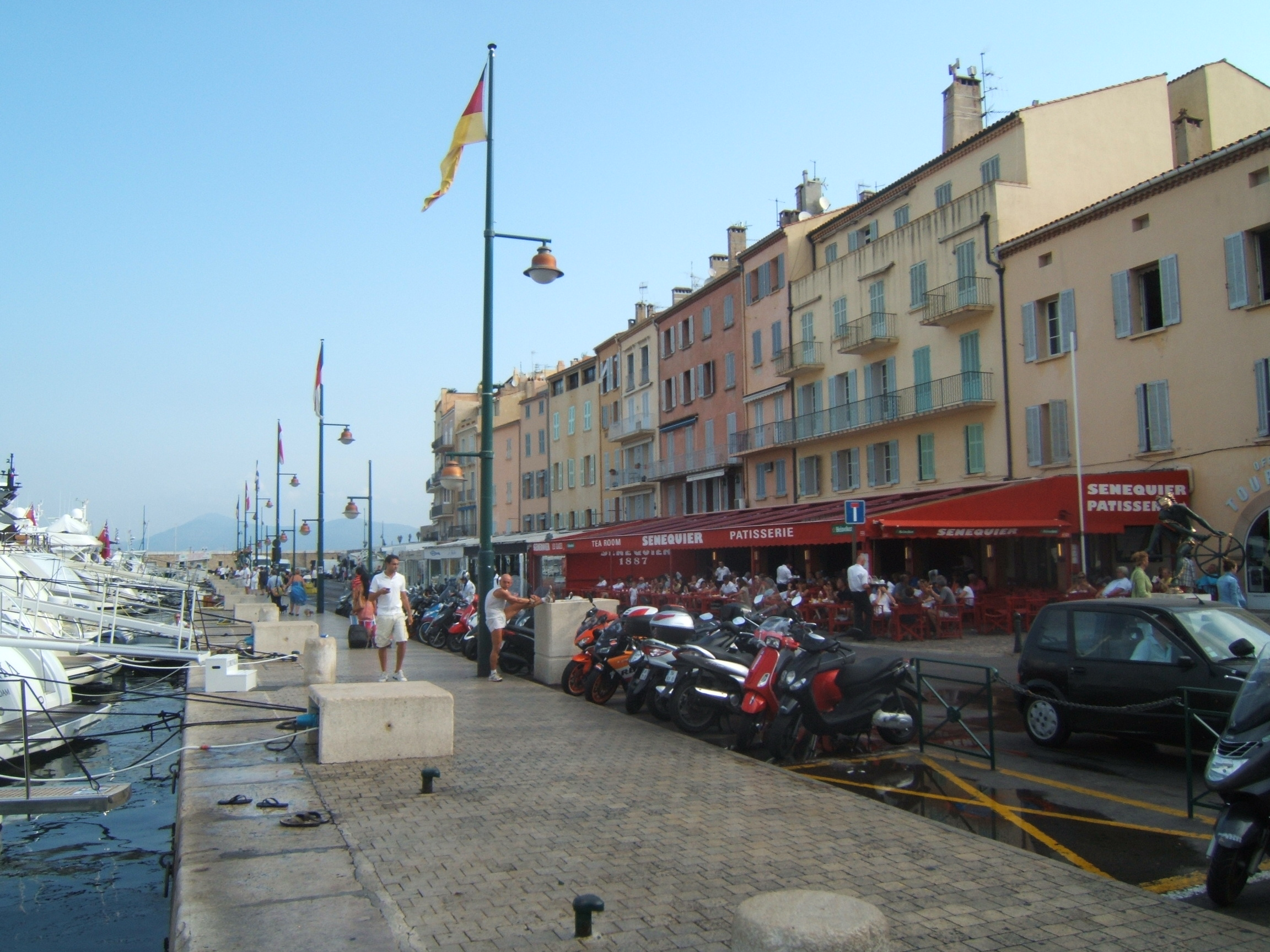
Harbour promenade with cafes

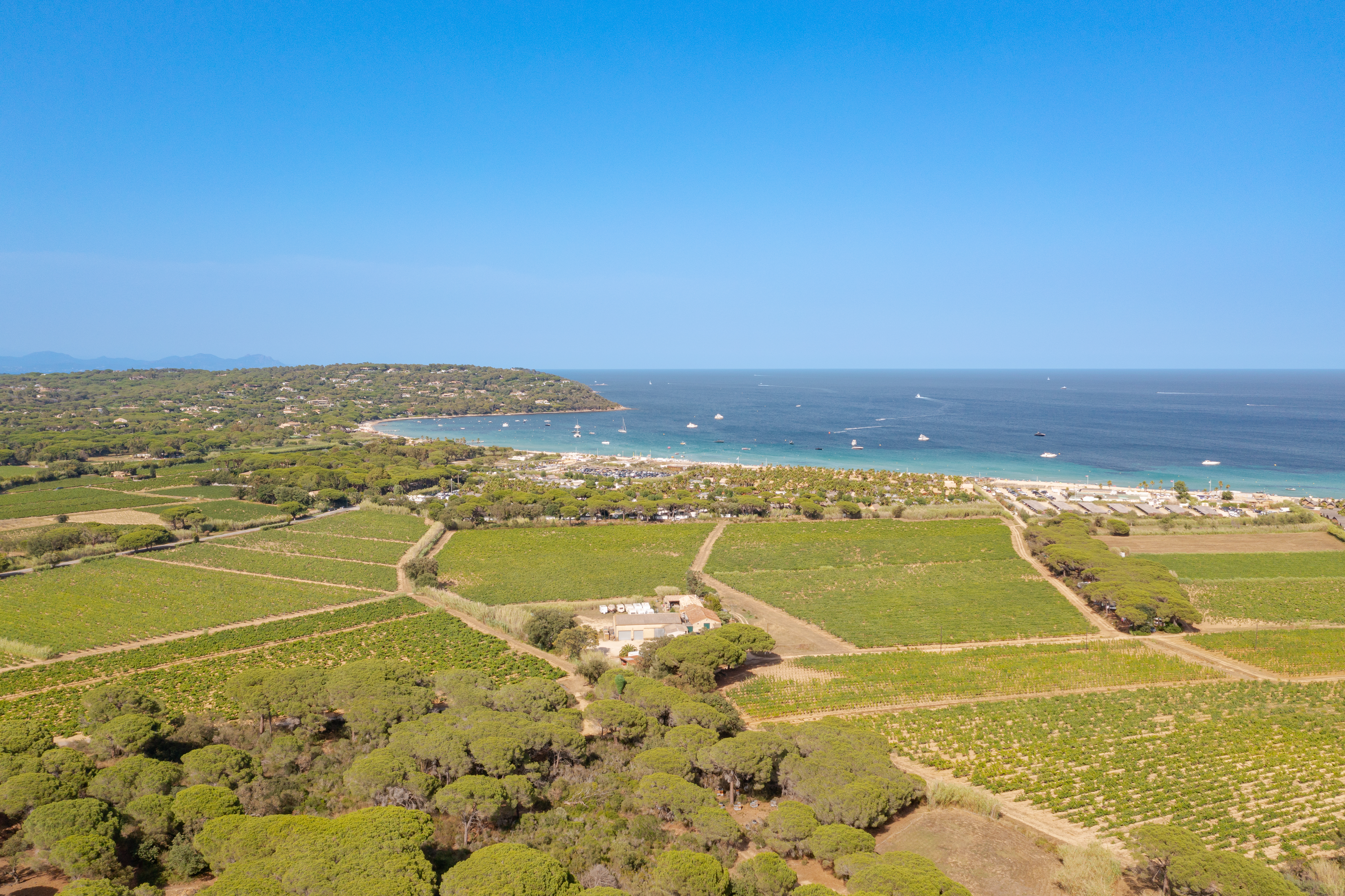
Aerial view of vineyards in Saint-Tropez

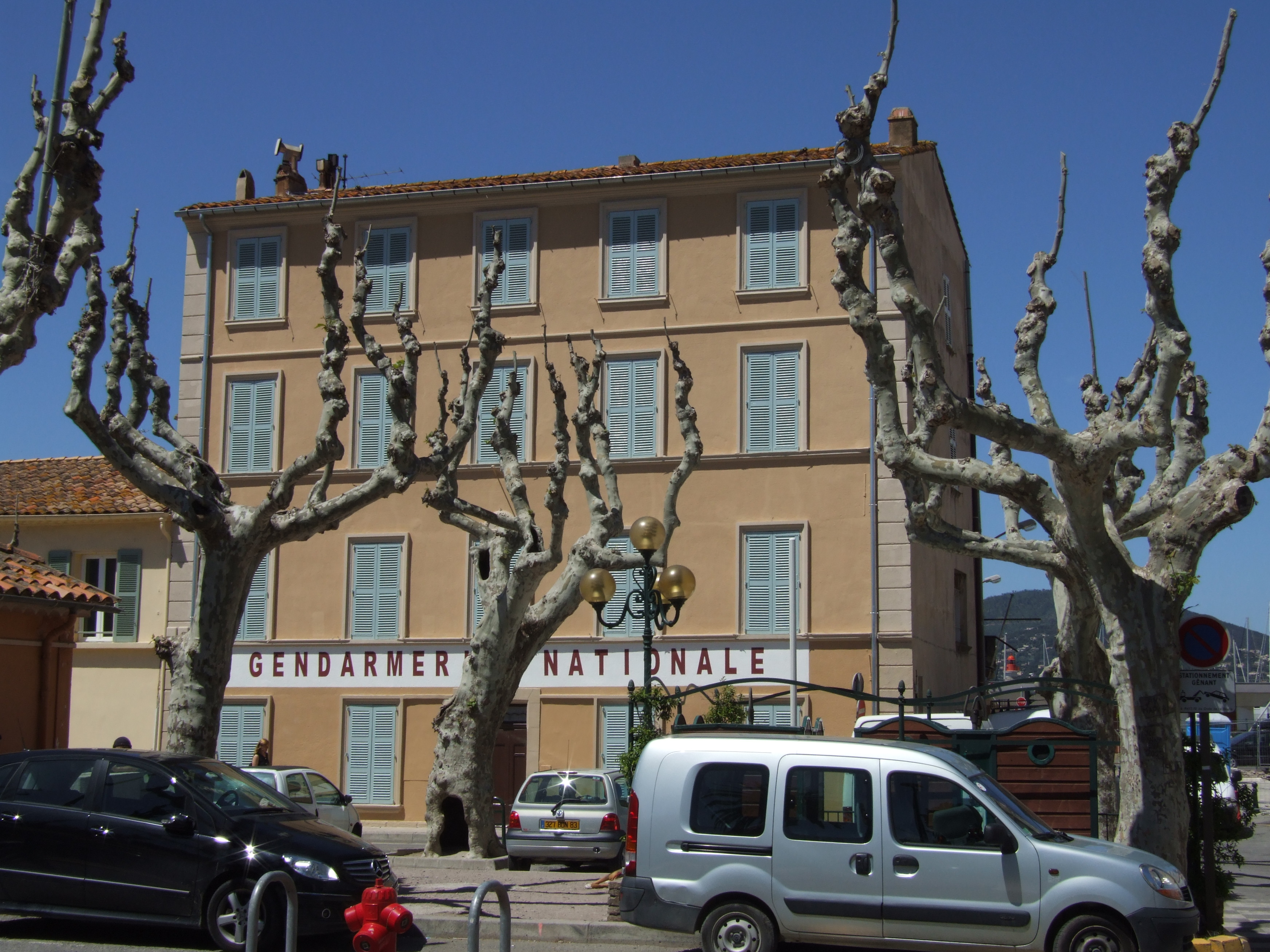
Old gendarmerie station; popular spot for photographs (cf. Le Gendarme de Saint-Tropez)

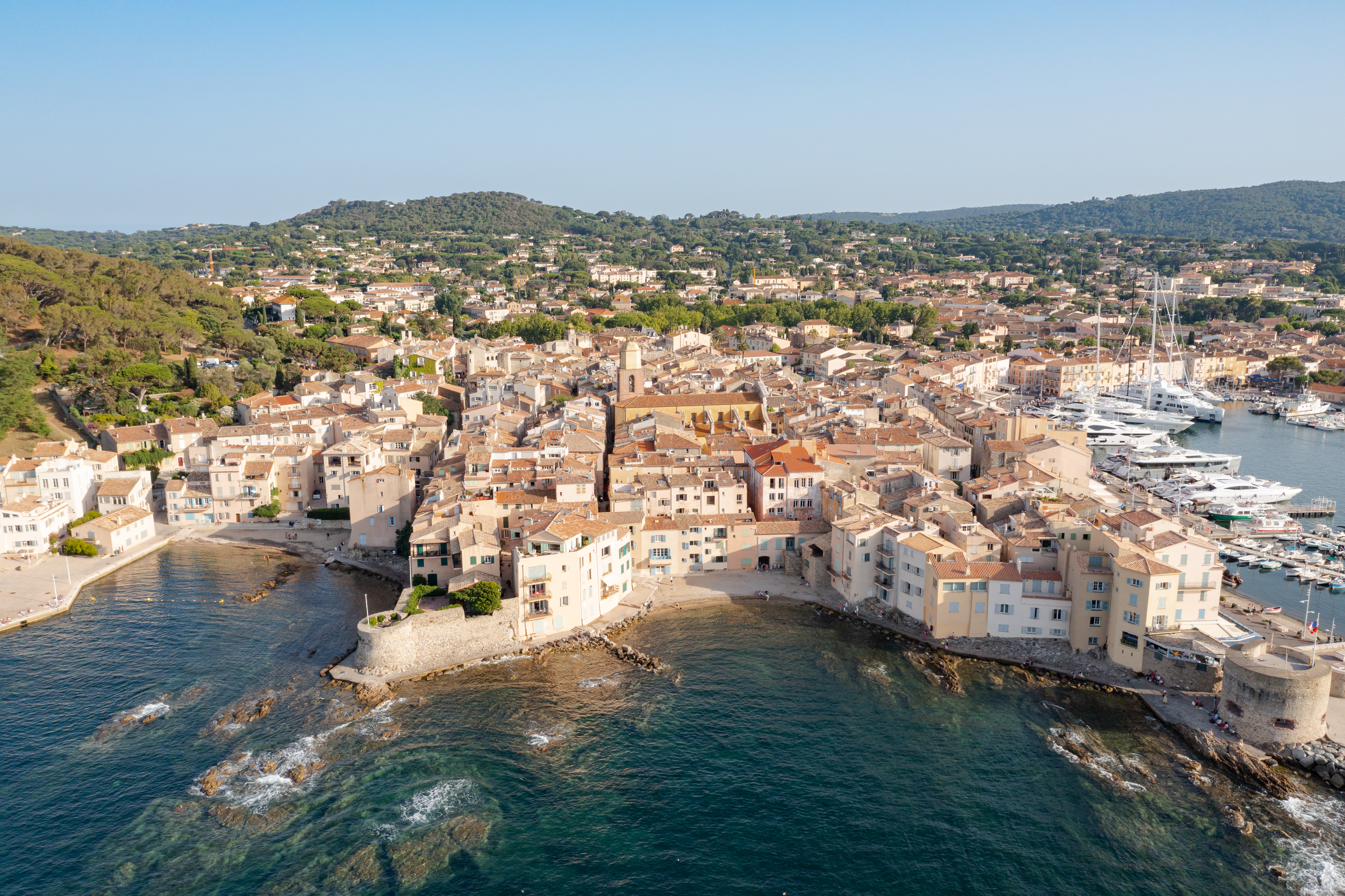
Aerial view of the old town of Saint-Tropez

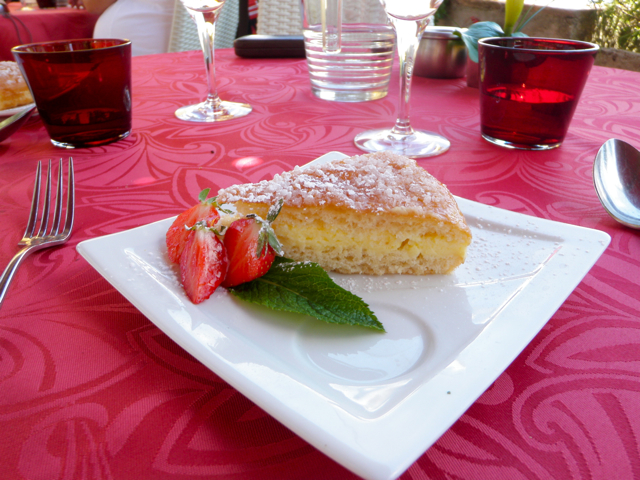
Tarte tropézienne (Tropezian tart)

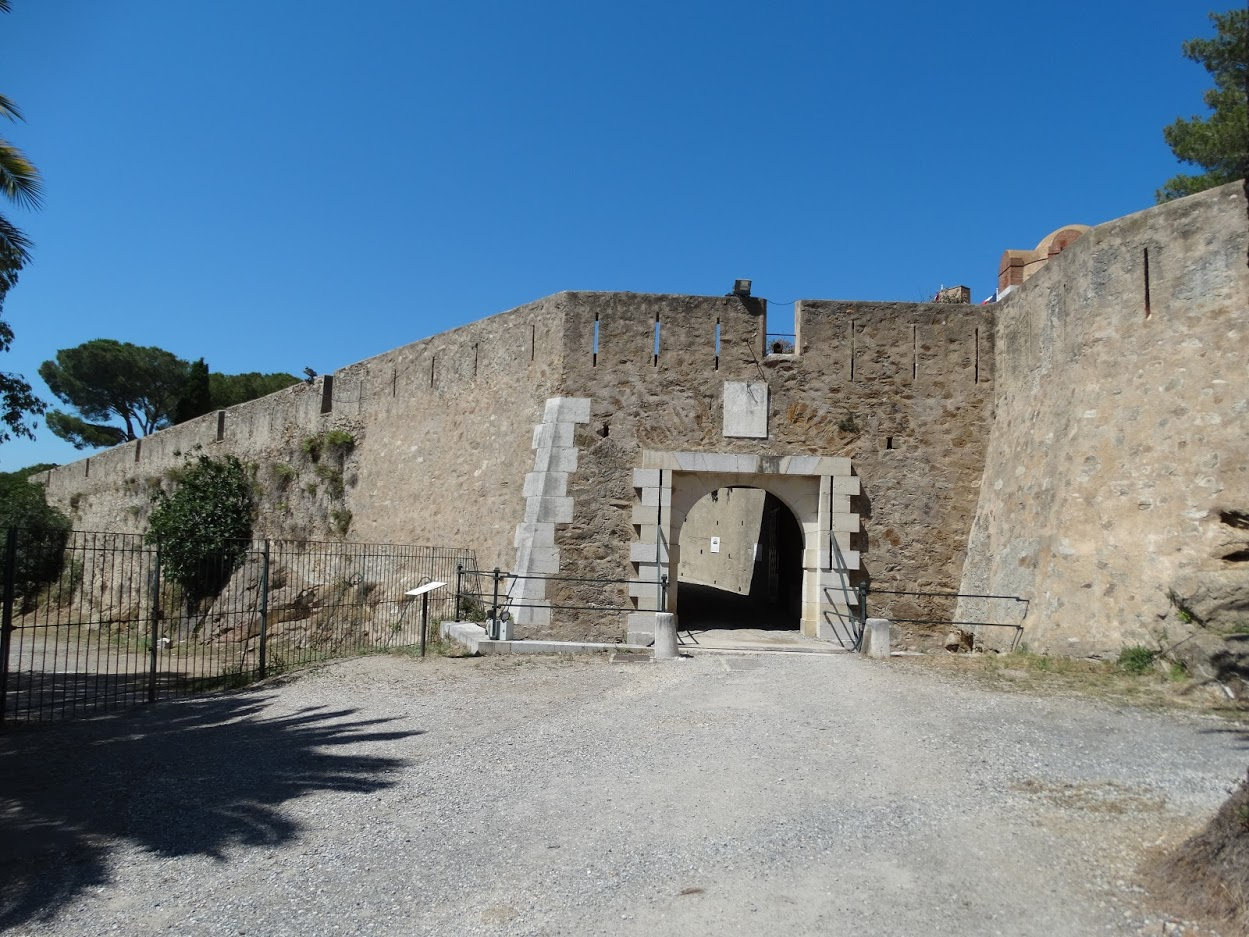
The main gate to Citadel

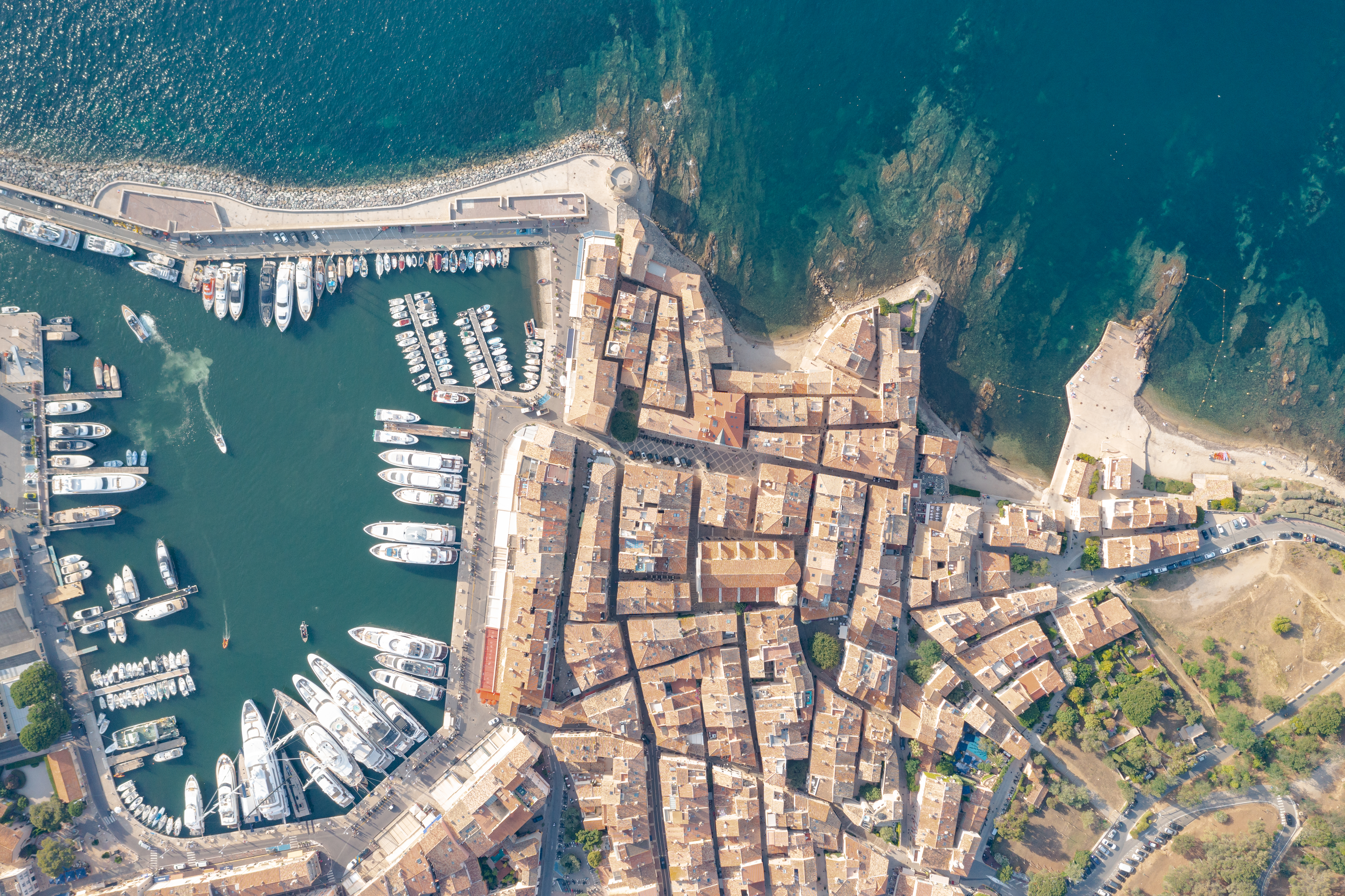
Top-down aerial of the old town of Saint-Tropez

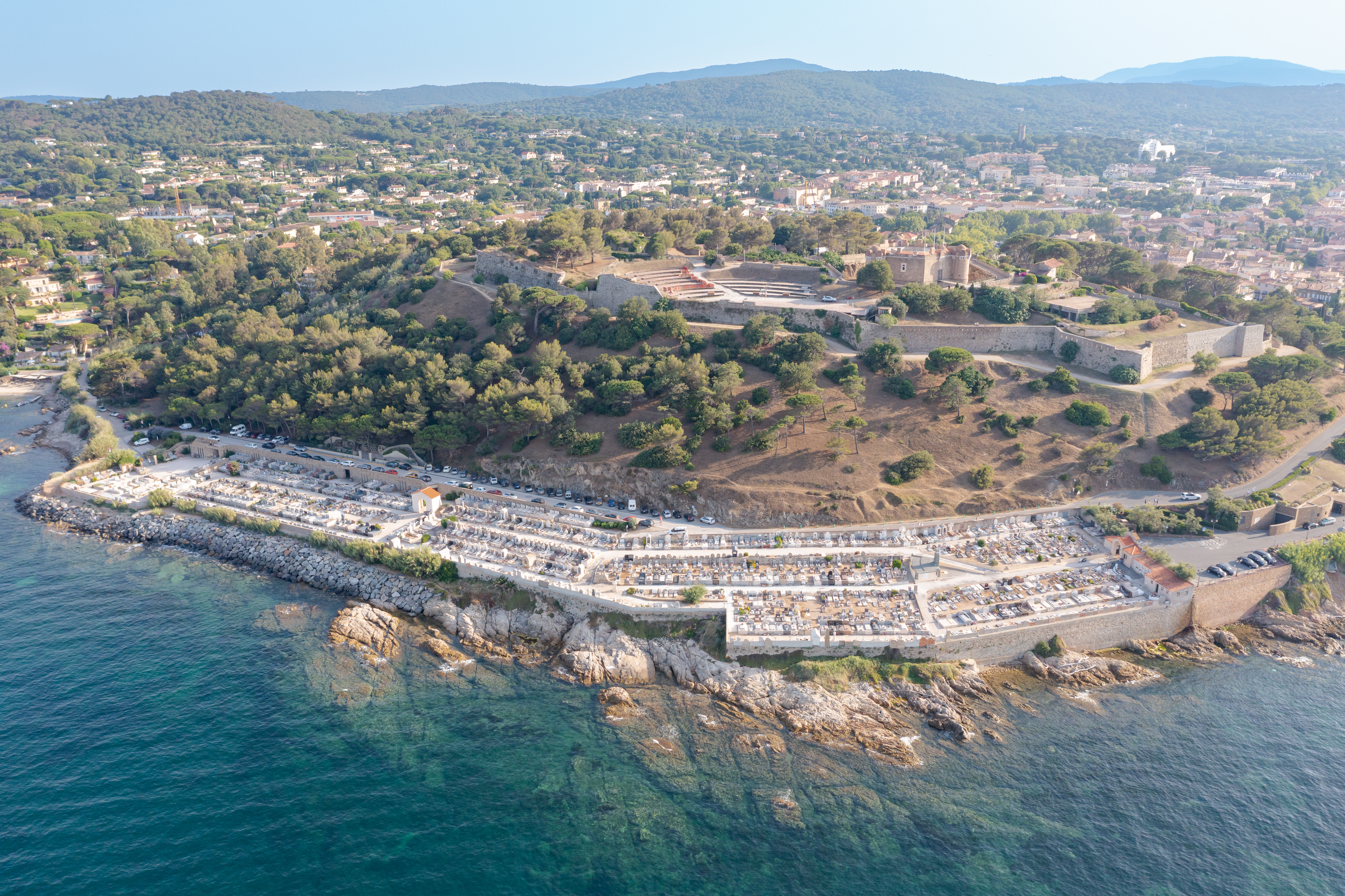
Aerial view of the cemetery of Saint-Tropez

== List of media connected with Saint-Tropez ==
Non-exhaustive filmography

- Saint-Tropez, devoir de vacances (short film, 1952)
- Et Dieu... créa la femme (1956)
- Bonjour Tristesse (1958)
- A Mistress for the Summer (1960)
- Saint-Tropez Blues (1960)
- Le Gendarme de Saint-Tropez (1964) and its sequels Le Gendarme à New York (1965), Le Gendarme se marie (1968), Le Gendarme en balade (1970), Le Gendarme et les Extra-terrestres (1979) and finally Le Gendarme et les Gendarmettes (1982)
- La Collectionneuse (1967)
- La Chamade (1968)
- Les Biches (1968)
- La Piscine (1969)
- Le Viager (1972)
- La Cage aux Folles (1978)
- Le Coup du parapluie (1980)
- Le Beau Monde (1981)
- Les Sous-doués en vacances (1981)
- Trilogy by Max Pécas: Les Branchés à Saint-Tropez (1983), Deux enfoirés à Saint-Tropez (1986) and On se calme et on boit frais à Saint-Tropez (1987)
- A Summer in St. Tropez (1984)
- Le Facteur de Saint-Tropez (1985)
- Les Randonneurs à Saint-Tropez (2008)

Television series

- Sous le soleil, broadcast in over 100 countries by the name "Saint-Tropez"
- Emily in Paris, an American-French romantic-comedy-drama had one episode in Saint-Tropez "Do You Know the Way to St. Tropez?"

Literature

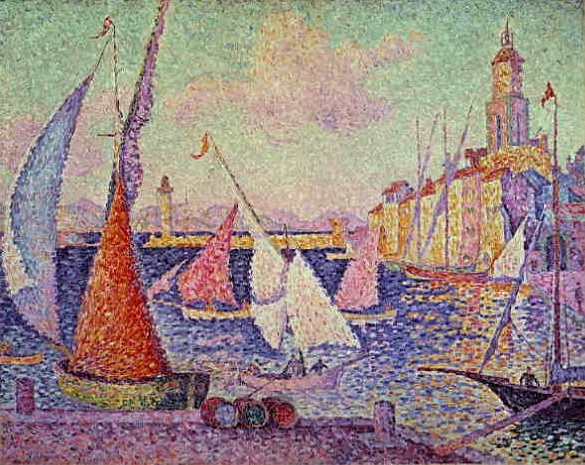
Port of Saint-Tropez Paul Signac (1899)

- Saint-Tropez, avec des lithographies originales by Bernard Buffet (1979)
- Saint-Tropez d'hier et d'aujourd'hui, avec des photographies by Luc Fournol (1981) by Annabel Buffet
- Les Lionnes by Saint-Tropez by Jacqueline Monsigny 1989
- La folle histoire et véridique histoire de Saint-Tropez by Yves Bigot, 1998
- Sunset in St. Tropez by Danielle Steel, 2004
- Rester normal à Saint-Tropez, strip cartoon by Frédéric Beigbeder, 2004
- La Légende de Saint-Tropez by Henry-Jean Servat, preface by Brigitte Bardot, éditions Assouline, 2003

Paintings

- Port of Saint-Tropez, Paul Signac (1899)
- Port of Saint-Tropez, Henri Lebasque (before 1936)
- A panoramic view of Saint-Tropez by Paul Leduc (1876–1943)
