= List of minor planets: 85001–86000 =

The following is a partial list of minor planets, running from minor-planet number 85001 through 86000, inclusive. The primary data for this and other partial lists is based on JPL's "Small-Body Orbital Elements" and data available from the Minor Planet Center. Critical list information is also provided by the MPC, unless otherwise specified from Lowell Observatory. A detailed description of the table's columns and additional sources are given on the main page including a complete list of every page in this series, and a statistical break-up on the dynamical classification of minor planets.

Also see the summary list of all named bodies in numerical and alphabetical order, and the corresponding naming citations for the number range of this particular list. New namings may only be added to this list after official publication, as the preannouncement of names is condemned by the Working Group for Small Bodies Nomenclature of the International Astronomical Union.

Near-Earth obj.	MBA (inner)	MBA (outer)	Centaur
Mars-crosser	MBA (middle)	Jupiter trojan	Trans-Neptunian obj.
Unclassified

== 85001–85100 ==
Designation			Discovery			Properties		Ref
Permanent	Provisional	Named after	Date	Site	Discoverer(s)	Category	Diam.	Ref
85001	2003 YP_{128}	—	December 27, 2003	Socorro	LINEAR	·	1.5 km	MPC · JPL
85002	2003 YT_{138}	—	December 27, 2003	Socorro	LINEAR	·	2.1 km	MPC · JPL
85003	2003 YR_{142}	—	December 28, 2003	Socorro	LINEAR	·	4.8 km	MPC · JPL
85004 Crombie	2003 YY_{152}	Crombie	December 29, 2003	Catalina	CSS	PHO	1.6 km	MPC · JPL
85005	2003 YF_{154}	—	December 29, 2003	Socorro	LINEAR	·	6.1 km	MPC · JPL
85006	2003 YU_{154}	—	December 29, 2003	Socorro	LINEAR	·	3.7 km	MPC · JPL
85007	2004 AK_{3}	—	January 13, 2004	Anderson Mesa	LONEOS	·	4.4 km	MPC · JPL
85008	2004 BL_{3}	—	January 16, 2004	Palomar	NEAT	·	5.5 km	MPC · JPL
85009	2004 BL_{4}	—	January 16, 2004	Palomar	NEAT	·	2.9 km	MPC · JPL
85010	2004 BY_{9}	—	January 16, 2004	Palomar	NEAT	·	2.3 km	MPC · JPL
85011	2004 BA_{16}	—	January 18, 2004	Palomar	NEAT	·	3.6 km	MPC · JPL
85012	2004 BY_{27}	—	January 18, 2004	Palomar	NEAT	·	1.2 km	MPC · JPL
85013	2004 BO_{36}	—	January 19, 2004	Kitt Peak	Spacewatch	·	3.9 km	MPC · JPL
85014 Sutter	2004 BD_{38}	Sutter	January 19, 2004	Catalina	CSS	·	4.2 km	MPC · JPL
85015 Gaskell	2004 BE_{38}	Gaskell	January 19, 2004	Catalina	CSS	MAS	1.5 km	MPC · JPL
85016	2004 BW_{42}	—	January 19, 2004	Catalina	CSS	·	7.1 km	MPC · JPL
85017	2004 BH_{52}	—	January 21, 2004	Socorro	LINEAR	THM	5.3 km	MPC · JPL
85018	2004 BL_{54}	—	January 22, 2004	Socorro	LINEAR	·	2.6 km	MPC · JPL
85019	2039 P-L	—	September 24, 1960	Palomar	C. J. van Houten, I. van Houten-Groeneveld, T. Gehrels	·	2.2 km	MPC · JPL
85020	2057 P-L	—	September 24, 1960	Palomar	C. J. van Houten, I. van Houten-Groeneveld, T. Gehrels	·	1.6 km	MPC · JPL
85021	2067 P-L	—	September 24, 1960	Palomar	C. J. van Houten, I. van Houten-Groeneveld, T. Gehrels	·	5.6 km	MPC · JPL
85022	2068 P-L	—	September 24, 1960	Palomar	C. J. van Houten, I. van Houten-Groeneveld, T. Gehrels	·	4.8 km	MPC · JPL
85023	2087 P-L	—	September 24, 1960	Palomar	C. J. van Houten, I. van Houten-Groeneveld, T. Gehrels	NAE	6.5 km	MPC · JPL
85024	2224 P-L	—	September 24, 1960	Palomar	C. J. van Houten, I. van Houten-Groeneveld, T. Gehrels	·	1.2 km	MPC · JPL
85025	2544 P-L	—	September 24, 1960	Palomar	C. J. van Houten, I. van Houten-Groeneveld, T. Gehrels	·	3.7 km	MPC · JPL
85026	2653 P-L	—	September 24, 1960	Palomar	C. J. van Houten, I. van Houten-Groeneveld, T. Gehrels	HYG	4.8 km	MPC · JPL
85027	2677 P-L	—	September 24, 1960	Palomar	C. J. van Houten, I. van Houten-Groeneveld, T. Gehrels	·	3.3 km	MPC · JPL
85028	2729 P-L	—	September 24, 1960	Palomar	C. J. van Houten, I. van Houten-Groeneveld, T. Gehrels	·	3.3 km	MPC · JPL
85029	2755 P-L	—	September 24, 1960	Palomar	C. J. van Houten, I. van Houten-Groeneveld, T. Gehrels	slow	5.3 km	MPC · JPL
85030 Admetos	2804 P-L	Admetos	September 24, 1960	Palomar	C. J. van Houten, I. van Houten-Groeneveld, T. Gehrels	L4	21 km	MPC · JPL
85031	2860 P-L	—	September 24, 1960	Palomar	C. J. van Houten, I. van Houten-Groeneveld, T. Gehrels	EUN	2.5 km	MPC · JPL
85032	3054 P-L	—	September 24, 1960	Palomar	C. J. van Houten, I. van Houten-Groeneveld, T. Gehrels	GEF	3.4 km	MPC · JPL
85033	3073 P-L	—	September 24, 1960	Palomar	C. J. van Houten, I. van Houten-Groeneveld, T. Gehrels	·	3.1 km	MPC · JPL
85034	3542 P-L	—	October 17, 1960	Palomar	C. J. van Houten, I. van Houten-Groeneveld, T. Gehrels	INA	9.7 km	MPC · JPL
85035	4149 P-L	—	September 24, 1960	Palomar	C. J. van Houten, I. van Houten-Groeneveld, T. Gehrels	(5)	1.6 km	MPC · JPL
85036	4203 P-L	—	September 24, 1960	Palomar	C. J. van Houten, I. van Houten-Groeneveld, T. Gehrels	ULA · CYB	8.6 km	MPC · JPL
85037	4279 P-L	—	September 24, 1960	Palomar	C. J. van Houten, I. van Houten-Groeneveld, T. Gehrels	V	1.1 km	MPC · JPL
85038	4313 P-L	—	September 24, 1960	Palomar	C. J. van Houten, I. van Houten-Groeneveld, T. Gehrels	·	2.5 km	MPC · JPL
85039	4541 P-L	—	September 24, 1960	Palomar	C. J. van Houten, I. van Houten-Groeneveld, T. Gehrels	·	4.4 km	MPC · JPL
85040	4617 P-L	—	September 24, 1960	Palomar	C. J. van Houten, I. van Houten-Groeneveld, T. Gehrels	·	1.7 km	MPC · JPL
85041	4653 P-L	—	September 24, 1960	Palomar	C. J. van Houten, I. van Houten-Groeneveld, T. Gehrels	·	9.0 km	MPC · JPL
85042	4779 P-L	—	September 24, 1960	Palomar	C. J. van Houten, I. van Houten-Groeneveld, T. Gehrels	AGN	1.9 km	MPC · JPL
85043	4817 P-L	—	September 24, 1960	Palomar	C. J. van Houten, I. van Houten-Groeneveld, T. Gehrels	·	2.9 km	MPC · JPL
85044	4829 P-L	—	September 24, 1960	Palomar	C. J. van Houten, I. van Houten-Groeneveld, T. Gehrels	·	3.6 km	MPC · JPL
85045	5015 P-L	—	October 22, 1960	Palomar	C. J. van Houten, I. van Houten-Groeneveld, T. Gehrels	EUN	2.3 km	MPC · JPL
85046	6126 P-L	—	September 24, 1960	Palomar	C. J. van Houten, I. van Houten-Groeneveld, T. Gehrels	·	1.8 km	MPC · JPL
85047 Krakatau	6255 P-L	Krakatau	September 24, 1960	Palomar	C. J. van Houten, I. van Houten-Groeneveld, T. Gehrels	H	1.4 km	MPC · JPL
85048	6265 P-L	—	September 24, 1960	Palomar	C. J. van Houten, I. van Houten-Groeneveld, T. Gehrels	·	2.9 km	MPC · JPL
85049	6279 P-L	—	September 24, 1960	Palomar	C. J. van Houten, I. van Houten-Groeneveld, T. Gehrels	V	1.4 km	MPC · JPL
85050	6572 P-L	—	September 24, 1960	Palomar	C. J. van Houten, I. van Houten-Groeneveld, T. Gehrels	·	1.8 km	MPC · JPL
85051	6641 P-L	—	September 24, 1960	Palomar	C. J. van Houten, I. van Houten-Groeneveld, T. Gehrels	·	3.8 km	MPC · JPL
85052	6778 P-L	—	September 24, 1960	Palomar	C. J. van Houten, I. van Houten-Groeneveld, T. Gehrels	·	6.1 km	MPC · JPL
85053	6789 P-L	—	September 24, 1960	Palomar	C. J. van Houten, I. van Houten-Groeneveld, T. Gehrels	·	3.8 km	MPC · JPL
85054	6841 P-L	—	September 24, 1960	Palomar	C. J. van Houten, I. van Houten-Groeneveld, T. Gehrels	·	1.5 km	MPC · JPL
85055	6872 P-L	—	September 24, 1960	Palomar	C. J. van Houten, I. van Houten-Groeneveld, T. Gehrels	·	5.4 km	MPC · JPL
85056	9093 P-L	—	September 24, 1960	Palomar	C. J. van Houten, I. van Houten-Groeneveld, T. Gehrels	NYS	2.4 km	MPC · JPL
85057	9608 P-L	—	October 17, 1960	Palomar	C. J. van Houten, I. van Houten-Groeneveld, T. Gehrels	·	6.0 km	MPC · JPL
85058	1112 T-1	—	March 25, 1971	Palomar	C. J. van Houten, I. van Houten-Groeneveld, T. Gehrels	·	5.4 km	MPC · JPL
85059	1211 T-1	—	March 25, 1971	Palomar	C. J. van Houten, I. van Houten-Groeneveld, T. Gehrels	NYS ·	4.1 km	MPC · JPL
85060	2080 T-1	—	March 25, 1971	Palomar	C. J. van Houten, I. van Houten-Groeneveld, T. Gehrels	·	2.3 km	MPC · JPL
85061	2137 T-1	—	March 25, 1971	Palomar	C. J. van Houten, I. van Houten-Groeneveld, T. Gehrels	·	4.2 km	MPC · JPL
85062	2272 T-1	—	March 25, 1971	Palomar	C. J. van Houten, I. van Houten-Groeneveld, T. Gehrels	·	2.5 km	MPC · JPL
85063	3148 T-1	—	March 26, 1971	Palomar	C. J. van Houten, I. van Houten-Groeneveld, T. Gehrels	T_{j} (2.98) · EUP	8.0 km	MPC · JPL
85064	3338 T-1	—	March 26, 1971	Palomar	C. J. van Houten, I. van Houten-Groeneveld, T. Gehrels	NYS	2.7 km	MPC · JPL
85065	4053 T-1	—	March 26, 1971	Palomar	C. J. van Houten, I. van Houten-Groeneveld, T. Gehrels	·	4.1 km	MPC · JPL
85066	4255 T-1	—	March 26, 1971	Palomar	C. J. van Houten, I. van Houten-Groeneveld, T. Gehrels	·	2.4 km	MPC · JPL
85067	4333 T-1	—	March 26, 1971	Palomar	C. J. van Houten, I. van Houten-Groeneveld, T. Gehrels	THM	4.6 km	MPC · JPL
85068	1021 T-2	—	September 29, 1973	Palomar	C. J. van Houten, I. van Houten-Groeneveld, T. Gehrels	·	2.3 km	MPC · JPL
85069	1056 T-2	—	September 29, 1973	Palomar	C. J. van Houten, I. van Houten-Groeneveld, T. Gehrels	AGN	2.8 km	MPC · JPL
85070	1120 T-2	—	September 30, 1973	Palomar	C. J. van Houten, I. van Houten-Groeneveld, T. Gehrels	(5)	2.2 km	MPC · JPL
85071	1189 T-2	—	September 29, 1973	Palomar	C. J. van Houten, I. van Houten-Groeneveld, T. Gehrels	·	2.1 km	MPC · JPL
85072	1245 T-2	—	September 29, 1973	Palomar	C. J. van Houten, I. van Houten-Groeneveld, T. Gehrels	·	2.5 km	MPC · JPL
85073	1263 T-2	—	September 29, 1973	Palomar	C. J. van Houten, I. van Houten-Groeneveld, T. Gehrels	·	1.4 km	MPC · JPL
85074	1288 T-2	—	September 29, 1973	Palomar	C. J. van Houten, I. van Houten-Groeneveld, T. Gehrels	AST	4.6 km	MPC · JPL
85075	1444 T-2	—	September 29, 1973	Palomar	C. J. van Houten, I. van Houten-Groeneveld, T. Gehrels	·	6.1 km	MPC · JPL
85076	1451 T-2	—	September 30, 1973	Palomar	C. J. van Houten, I. van Houten-Groeneveld, T. Gehrels	·	2.2 km	MPC · JPL
85077	1454 T-2	—	September 29, 1973	Palomar	C. J. van Houten, I. van Houten-Groeneveld, T. Gehrels	V	1.2 km	MPC · JPL
85078	1509 T-2	—	September 29, 1973	Palomar	C. J. van Houten, I. van Houten-Groeneveld, T. Gehrels	·	1.4 km	MPC · JPL
85079	2047 T-2	—	September 29, 1973	Palomar	C. J. van Houten, I. van Houten-Groeneveld, T. Gehrels	·	2.2 km	MPC · JPL
85080	2070 T-2	—	September 29, 1973	Palomar	C. J. van Houten, I. van Houten-Groeneveld, T. Gehrels	·	3.9 km	MPC · JPL
85081	2153 T-2	—	September 29, 1973	Palomar	C. J. van Houten, I. van Houten-Groeneveld, T. Gehrels	HYG	5.6 km	MPC · JPL
85082	2158 T-2	—	September 29, 1973	Palomar	C. J. van Houten, I. van Houten-Groeneveld, T. Gehrels	NYS	3.0 km	MPC · JPL
85083	2305 T-2	—	September 29, 1973	Palomar	C. J. van Houten, I. van Houten-Groeneveld, T. Gehrels	·	2.0 km	MPC · JPL
85084	2309 T-2	—	September 29, 1973	Palomar	C. J. van Houten, I. van Houten-Groeneveld, T. Gehrels	·	4.8 km	MPC · JPL
85085	3014 T-2	—	September 30, 1973	Palomar	C. J. van Houten, I. van Houten-Groeneveld, T. Gehrels	·	6.7 km	MPC · JPL
85086	3059 T-2	—	September 30, 1973	Palomar	C. J. van Houten, I. van Houten-Groeneveld, T. Gehrels	(1298)	7.1 km	MPC · JPL
85087	3090 T-2	—	September 30, 1973	Palomar	C. J. van Houten, I. van Houten-Groeneveld, T. Gehrels	MAS	1.3 km	MPC · JPL
85088	3202 T-2	—	September 30, 1973	Palomar	C. J. van Houten, I. van Houten-Groeneveld, T. Gehrels	·	4.9 km	MPC · JPL
85089	3304 T-2	—	September 30, 1973	Palomar	C. J. van Houten, I. van Houten-Groeneveld, T. Gehrels	KOR	2.9 km	MPC · JPL
85090	4028 T-2	—	September 29, 1973	Palomar	C. J. van Houten, I. van Houten-Groeneveld, T. Gehrels	NYS	4.1 km	MPC · JPL
85091	4112 T-2	—	September 29, 1973	Palomar	C. J. van Houten, I. van Houten-Groeneveld, T. Gehrels	·	5.6 km	MPC · JPL
85092	4253 T-2	—	September 29, 1973	Palomar	C. J. van Houten, I. van Houten-Groeneveld, T. Gehrels	·	2.4 km	MPC · JPL
85093	5071 T-2	—	September 25, 1973	Palomar	C. J. van Houten, I. van Houten-Groeneveld, T. Gehrels	·	2.8 km	MPC · JPL
85094	5119 T-2	—	September 25, 1973	Palomar	C. J. van Houten, I. van Houten-Groeneveld, T. Gehrels	V	1.6 km	MPC · JPL
85095 Hekla	5192 T-2	Hekla	September 25, 1973	Palomar	C. J. van Houten, I. van Houten-Groeneveld, T. Gehrels	H	990 m	MPC · JPL
85096	1044 T-3	—	October 17, 1977	Palomar	C. J. van Houten, I. van Houten-Groeneveld, T. Gehrels	·	2.2 km	MPC · JPL
85097	1082 T-3	—	October 17, 1977	Palomar	C. J. van Houten, I. van Houten-Groeneveld, T. Gehrels	·	2.6 km	MPC · JPL
85098	1208 T-3	—	October 17, 1977	Palomar	C. J. van Houten, I. van Houten-Groeneveld, T. Gehrels	·	6.9 km	MPC · JPL
85099	1213 T-3	—	October 17, 1977	Palomar	C. J. van Houten, I. van Houten-Groeneveld, T. Gehrels	·	2.1 km	MPC · JPL
85100	2189 T-3	—	October 16, 1977	Palomar	C. J. van Houten, I. van Houten-Groeneveld, T. Gehrels	(5)	2.0 km	MPC · JPL

== 85101–85200 ==
back to top

Designation			Discovery			Properties		Ref
Permanent	Provisional	Named after	Date	Site	Discoverer(s)	Category	Diam.	Ref
85101	2192 T-3	—	October 16, 1977	Palomar	C. J. van Houten, I. van Houten-Groeneveld, T. Gehrels	NYS	2.0 km	MPC · JPL
85102	2211 T-3	—	October 16, 1977	Palomar	C. J. van Houten, I. van Houten-Groeneveld, T. Gehrels	·	2.4 km	MPC · JPL
85103	2412 T-3	—	October 16, 1977	Palomar	C. J. van Houten, I. van Houten-Groeneveld, T. Gehrels	·	6.7 km	MPC · JPL
85104	2415 T-3	—	October 16, 1977	Palomar	C. J. van Houten, I. van Houten-Groeneveld, T. Gehrels	·	3.0 km	MPC · JPL
85105	2433 T-3	—	October 16, 1977	Palomar	C. J. van Houten, I. van Houten-Groeneveld, T. Gehrels	EUN	2.4 km	MPC · JPL
85106	3038 T-3	—	October 16, 1977	Palomar	C. J. van Houten, I. van Houten-Groeneveld, T. Gehrels	·	2.3 km	MPC · JPL
85107	3144 T-3	—	October 16, 1977	Palomar	C. J. van Houten, I. van Houten-Groeneveld, T. Gehrels	(5)	2.0 km	MPC · JPL
85108	3475 T-3	—	October 16, 1977	Palomar	C. J. van Houten, I. van Houten-Groeneveld, T. Gehrels	·	3.9 km	MPC · JPL
85109	3892 T-3	—	October 16, 1977	Palomar	C. J. van Houten, I. van Houten-Groeneveld, T. Gehrels	BRA	4.2 km	MPC · JPL
85110	4043 T-3	—	October 16, 1977	Palomar	C. J. van Houten, I. van Houten-Groeneveld, T. Gehrels	·	2.0 km	MPC · JPL
85111	4051 T-3	—	October 16, 1977	Palomar	C. J. van Houten, I. van Houten-Groeneveld, T. Gehrels	·	3.7 km	MPC · JPL
85112	4060 T-3	—	October 16, 1977	Palomar	C. J. van Houten, I. van Houten-Groeneveld, T. Gehrels	KOR	3.3 km	MPC · JPL
85113	4116 T-3	—	October 16, 1977	Palomar	C. J. van Houten, I. van Houten-Groeneveld, T. Gehrels	·	2.3 km	MPC · JPL
85114	4285 T-3	—	October 16, 1977	Palomar	C. J. van Houten, I. van Houten-Groeneveld, T. Gehrels	·	4.2 km	MPC · JPL
85115	4329 T-3	—	October 16, 1977	Palomar	C. J. van Houten, I. van Houten-Groeneveld, T. Gehrels	·	5.8 km	MPC · JPL
85116	4342 T-3	—	October 16, 1977	Palomar	C. J. van Houten, I. van Houten-Groeneveld, T. Gehrels	·	2.5 km	MPC · JPL
85117	5135 T-3	—	October 16, 1977	Palomar	C. J. van Houten, I. van Houten-Groeneveld, T. Gehrels	·	2.8 km	MPC · JPL
85118	1971 UU	—	October 26, 1971	Hamburg-Bergedorf	L. Kohoutek	·	4.8 km	MPC · JPL
85119 Hannieschaft	1972 RD	Hannieschaft	September 15, 1972	Palomar	T. Gehrels	H	1.1 km	MPC · JPL
85120	1975 SP_{1}	—	September 30, 1975	Palomar	S. J. Bus	·	2.4 km	MPC · JPL
85121 Loehde	1976 KF_{3}	Loehde	May 27, 1976	Siding Spring	Lowe, A.	·	1.4 km	MPC · JPL
85122	1978 UZ_{5}	—	October 27, 1978	Palomar	C. M. Olmstead	·	6.6 km	MPC · JPL
85123	1978 VC_{8}	—	November 7, 1978	Palomar	E. F. Helin, S. J. Bus	·	1.5 km	MPC · JPL
85124	1978 VF_{8}	—	November 7, 1978	Palomar	E. F. Helin, S. J. Bus	·	1.6 km	MPC · JPL
85125	1978 VU_{8}	—	November 7, 1978	Palomar	E. F. Helin, S. J. Bus	·	2.3 km	MPC · JPL
85126	1978 VO_{10}	—	November 7, 1978	Palomar	E. F. Helin, S. J. Bus	RAF	1.6 km	MPC · JPL
85127	1978 VJ_{11}	—	November 7, 1978	Palomar	E. F. Helin, S. J. Bus	PAD	5.9 km	MPC · JPL
85128	1979 HA	—	April 21, 1979	Palomar	Zelinsky, D.	PHO · fast	5.3 km	MPC · JPL
85129	1979 MC_{5}	—	June 25, 1979	Siding Spring	E. F. Helin, S. J. Bus	·	2.1 km	MPC · JPL
85130	1979 MH_{5}	—	June 25, 1979	Siding Spring	E. F. Helin, S. J. Bus	·	2.3 km	MPC · JPL
85131	1979 MT_{6}	—	June 25, 1979	Siding Spring	E. F. Helin, S. J. Bus	·	3.7 km	MPC · JPL
85132	1979 MR_{7}	—	June 25, 1979	Siding Spring	E. F. Helin, S. J. Bus	·	2.2 km	MPC · JPL
85133	1979 MX_{7}	—	June 25, 1979	Siding Spring	E. F. Helin, S. J. Bus	KON	4.4 km	MPC · JPL
85134	1979 MH_{8}	—	June 25, 1979	Siding Spring	E. F. Helin, S. J. Bus	NYS	1.3 km	MPC · JPL
85135	1979 QN_{1}	—	August 22, 1979	La Silla	C.-I. Lagerkvist	·	2.7 km	MPC · JPL
85136	1979 QX_{2}	—	August 22, 1979	La Silla	C.-I. Lagerkvist	·	2.9 km	MPC · JPL
85137	1981 DS_{3}	—	February 28, 1981	Siding Spring	S. J. Bus	EOS	3.5 km	MPC · JPL
85138	1981 ED_{7}	—	March 6, 1981	Siding Spring	S. J. Bus	·	6.7 km	MPC · JPL
85139	1981 EN_{9}	—	March 1, 1981	Siding Spring	S. J. Bus	·	2.4 km	MPC · JPL
85140	1981 ES_{19}	—	March 2, 1981	Siding Spring	S. J. Bus	·	1.5 km	MPC · JPL
85141	1981 EM_{28}	—	March 6, 1981	Siding Spring	S. J. Bus	EUP	6.6 km	MPC · JPL
85142	1981 EO_{29}	—	March 1, 1981	Siding Spring	S. J. Bus	3:2	8.3 km	MPC · JPL
85143	1981 EE_{30}	—	March 2, 1981	Siding Spring	S. J. Bus	·	3.4 km	MPC · JPL
85144	1981 EU_{30}	—	March 2, 1981	Siding Spring	S. J. Bus	V	1.8 km	MPC · JPL
85145	1981 ED_{33}	—	March 1, 1981	Siding Spring	S. J. Bus	V	1.8 km	MPC · JPL
85146	1981 EF_{33}	—	March 1, 1981	Siding Spring	S. J. Bus	·	1.8 km	MPC · JPL
85147	1981 EV_{38}	—	March 1, 1981	Siding Spring	S. J. Bus	HYG	5.8 km	MPC · JPL
85148	1981 EH_{39}	—	March 2, 1981	Siding Spring	S. J. Bus	·	1.8 km	MPC · JPL
85149	1981 EU_{43}	—	March 6, 1981	Siding Spring	S. J. Bus	·	4.6 km	MPC · JPL
85150	1981 EO_{46}	—	March 2, 1981	Siding Spring	S. J. Bus	THM	4.5 km	MPC · JPL
85151	1983 QT	—	August 30, 1983	Palomar	Gibson, J.	·	2.7 km	MPC · JPL
85152	1985 QL_{3}	—	August 16, 1985	Palomar	E. F. Helin	·	4.5 km	MPC · JPL
85153	1985 TA	—	October 12, 1985	Kitt Peak	Spacewatch	·	4.8 km	MPC · JPL
85154	1986 TS_{4}	—	October 11, 1986	Brorfelde	P. Jensen	·	6.5 km	MPC · JPL
85155	1986 VH_{7}	—	November 7, 1986	Kleť	A. Mrkos	NYS	2.7 km	MPC · JPL
85156	1987 RN_{1}	—	September 13, 1987	La Silla	H. Debehogne	·	4.7 km	MPC · JPL
85157	1987 SP_{5}	—	September 30, 1987	Brorfelde	P. Jensen	·	1.7 km	MPC · JPL
85158 Phyllistrapp	1987 UT_{1}	Phyllistrapp	October 17, 1987	Palomar	C. S. Shoemaker	·	2.1 km	MPC · JPL
85159	1988 DL	—	February 22, 1988	Siding Spring	R. H. McNaught	GEF	3.9 km	MPC · JPL
85160	1988 RW_{12}	—	September 14, 1988	Cerro Tololo	S. J. Bus	·	3.4 km	MPC · JPL
85161	1988 SA_{2}	—	September 16, 1988	Cerro Tololo	S. J. Bus	·	1.5 km	MPC · JPL
85162	1988 SL_{2}	—	September 16, 1988	Cerro Tololo	S. J. Bus	3:2 · SHU	11 km	MPC · JPL
85163	1988 SQ_{2}	—	September 16, 1988	Cerro Tololo	S. J. Bus	HIL · 3:2	12 km	MPC · JPL
85164	1988 TG_{2}	—	October 3, 1988	Kleť	A. Mrkos	·	4.1 km	MPC · JPL
85165	1988 TV_{2}	—	October 7, 1988	Palomar	C. S. Shoemaker	·	2.9 km	MPC · JPL
85166	1989 OC	—	July 21, 1989	Siding Spring	R. H. McNaught	·	4.0 km	MPC · JPL
85167	1989 RS_{2}	—	September 7, 1989	Kleť	A. Mrkos	·	5.5 km	MPC · JPL
85168 Albertacentenary	1989 RC_{6}	Albertacentenary	September 2, 1989	Palomar	Lowe, A.	·	6.7 km	MPC · JPL
85169	1989 SN_{2}	—	September 26, 1989	La Silla	E. W. Elst	·	6.9 km	MPC · JPL
85170	1989 TZ_{3}	—	October 7, 1989	La Silla	E. W. Elst	·	2.4 km	MPC · JPL
85171	1989 TZ_{6}	—	October 7, 1989	La Silla	E. W. Elst	·	3.9 km	MPC · JPL
85172	1990 QU_{6}	—	August 20, 1990	La Silla	E. W. Elst	NYS	2.1 km	MPC · JPL
85173	1990 QV_{6}	—	August 20, 1990	La Silla	E. W. Elst	·	2.5 km	MPC · JPL
85174	1990 QN_{8}	—	August 16, 1990	La Silla	E. W. Elst	·	1.3 km	MPC · JPL
85175	1990 RS	—	September 13, 1990	Palomar	C. M. Olmstead	·	2.9 km	MPC · JPL
85176	1990 RP_{2}	—	September 15, 1990	Palomar	H. E. Holt	·	1.9 km	MPC · JPL
85177	1990 SE_{3}	—	September 18, 1990	Palomar	H. E. Holt	·	7.3 km	MPC · JPL
85178	1990 TQ	—	October 10, 1990	Kitami	K. Endate, K. Watanabe	·	2.2 km	MPC · JPL
85179 Meistereckhart	1990 TS_{11}	Meistereckhart	October 11, 1990	Tautenburg Observatory	F. Börngen, L. D. Schmadel	NYS ·	3.2 km	MPC · JPL
85180	1990 UW_{5}	—	October 26, 1990	Oohira	T. Urata	PHO	2.1 km	MPC · JPL
85181	1990 VF_{6}	—	November 15, 1990	La Silla	E. W. Elst	·	2.9 km	MPC · JPL
85182	1991 AQ	—	January 14, 1991	Palomar	E. F. Helin	APO +1km · PHA	1.1 km	MPC · JPL
85183 Marcelaymé	1991 BE_{1}	Marcelaymé	January 18, 1991	Haute Provence	E. W. Elst	PHO	2.6 km	MPC · JPL
85184	1991 JG_{1}	—	May 9, 1991	Palomar	E. F. Helin	AMO	740 m	MPC · JPL
85185 Lederman	1991 LM_{3}	Lederman	June 6, 1991	La Silla	E. W. Elst	·	1.5 km	MPC · JPL
85186	1991 PR_{2}	—	August 2, 1991	La Silla	E. W. Elst	·	6.3 km	MPC · JPL
85187	1991 PC_{12}	—	August 7, 1991	Palomar	H. E. Holt	·	4.7 km	MPC · JPL
85188	1991 PK_{12}	—	August 7, 1991	Palomar	H. E. Holt	GEF	3.8 km	MPC · JPL
85189	1991 RL_{2}	—	September 4, 1991	Palomar	E. F. Helin	·	3.6 km	MPC · JPL
85190 Birgitroth	1991 RR_{3}	Birgitroth	September 12, 1991	Tautenburg Observatory	F. Börngen, L. D. Schmadel	EUN	3.6 km	MPC · JPL
85191	1991 RP_{4}	—	September 7, 1991	Kushiro	S. Ueda, H. Kaneda	·	3.8 km	MPC · JPL
85192	1991 RS_{11}	—	September 4, 1991	La Silla	E. W. Elst	·	2.7 km	MPC · JPL
85193	1991 RD_{19}	—	September 14, 1991	Palomar	H. E. Holt	·	3.7 km	MPC · JPL
85194	1991 TL_{2}	—	October 5, 1991	Palomar	C. S. Shoemaker	·	5.8 km	MPC · JPL
85195 von Helfta	1991 TW_{2}	von Helfta	October 7, 1991	Tautenburg Observatory	F. Börngen, L. D. Schmadel	·	2.6 km	MPC · JPL
85196 Halle	1991 TG_{3}	Halle	October 4, 1991	Tautenburg Observatory	F. Börngen, L. D. Schmadel	JUN	3.2 km	MPC · JPL
85197 Ginkgo	1991 TG_{5}	Ginkgo	October 5, 1991	Tautenburg Observatory	F. Börngen, L. D. Schmadel	·	1.2 km	MPC · JPL
85198 Weltenburg	1991 TC_{6}	Weltenburg	October 2, 1991	Tautenburg Observatory	F. Börngen, L. D. Schmadel	EOS	4.8 km	MPC · JPL
85199 Habsburg	1991 TE_{7}	Habsburg	October 3, 1991	Tautenburg Observatory	F. Börngen, L. D. Schmadel	·	1.6 km	MPC · JPL
85200 Johnhault	1991 TG_{15}	Johnhault	October 6, 1991	Palomar	Lowe, A.	(5)	2.0 km	MPC · JPL

== 85201–85300 ==
back to top

Designation			Discovery			Properties		Ref
Permanent	Provisional	Named after	Date	Site	Discoverer(s)	Category	Diam.	Ref
85201	1991 VU_{8}	—	November 4, 1991	Kitt Peak	Spacewatch	NYS	2.2 km	MPC · JPL
85202	1992 DR_{11}	—	February 29, 1992	La Silla	UESAC	EOS	3.3 km	MPC · JPL
85203	1992 EE_{5}	—	March 1, 1992	La Silla	UESAC	·	2.4 km	MPC · JPL
85204	1992 EX_{5}	—	March 2, 1992	La Silla	UESAC	EOS	4.9 km	MPC · JPL
85205	1992 EM_{6}	—	March 1, 1992	La Silla	UESAC	·	2.5 km	MPC · JPL
85206	1992 EQ_{7}	—	March 1, 1992	La Silla	UESAC	·	4.7 km	MPC · JPL
85207	1992 EB_{19}	—	March 1, 1992	La Silla	UESAC	·	1.9 km	MPC · JPL
85208	1992 EG_{20}	—	March 1, 1992	La Silla	UESAC	HYG	5.1 km	MPC · JPL
85209	1992 GM_{3}	—	April 4, 1992	La Silla	E. W. Elst	·	2.7 km	MPC · JPL
85210	1992 HM_{1}	—	April 26, 1992	Kitt Peak	Spacewatch	·	2.7 km	MPC · JPL
85211	1992 PL	—	August 8, 1992	Caussols	E. W. Elst	·	4.1 km	MPC · JPL
85212	1992 RF	—	September 4, 1992	Siding Spring	R. H. McNaught	(40134)	3.2 km	MPC · JPL
85213	1992 RN_{7}	—	September 2, 1992	La Silla	E. W. Elst	·	6.8 km	MPC · JPL
85214 Sommersdorf	1992 SZ_{1}	Sommersdorf	September 21, 1992	Tautenburg Observatory	F. Börngen, L. D. Schmadel	·	3.5 km	MPC · JPL
85215 Hohenzollern	1992 SD_{14}	Hohenzollern	September 26, 1992	Tautenburg Observatory	F. Börngen, L. D. Schmadel	·	3.9 km	MPC · JPL
85216 Schein	1992 SL_{17}	Schein	September 24, 1992	Tautenburg Observatory	F. Börngen, L. D. Schmadel	·	1.9 km	MPC · JPL
85217 Bilzingsleben	1992 US_{8}	Bilzingsleben	October 31, 1992	Tautenburg Observatory	F. Börngen	·	1.9 km	MPC · JPL
85218	1993 FW_{5}	—	March 17, 1993	La Silla	UESAC	·	5.7 km	MPC · JPL
85219	1993 FM_{9}	—	March 17, 1993	La Silla	UESAC	·	2.0 km	MPC · JPL
85220	1993 FY_{11}	—	March 17, 1993	La Silla	UESAC	ERI	3.8 km	MPC · JPL
85221	1993 FX_{13}	—	March 17, 1993	La Silla	UESAC	·	1.5 km	MPC · JPL
85222	1993 FO_{14}	—	March 17, 1993	La Silla	UESAC	·	1.8 km	MPC · JPL
85223	1993 FU_{22}	—	March 21, 1993	La Silla	UESAC	NYS	2.0 km	MPC · JPL
85224	1993 FT_{28}	—	March 21, 1993	La Silla	UESAC	·	2.8 km	MPC · JPL
85225	1993 FP_{31}	—	March 19, 1993	La Silla	UESAC	·	1.7 km	MPC · JPL
85226	1993 FQ_{37}	—	March 19, 1993	La Silla	UESAC	·	3.7 km	MPC · JPL
85227	1993 FT_{40}	—	March 19, 1993	La Silla	UESAC	·	5.4 km	MPC · JPL
85228	1993 FU_{45}	—	March 19, 1993	La Silla	UESAC	·	3.6 km	MPC · JPL
85229	1993 FU_{46}	—	March 19, 1993	La Silla	UESAC	KOR	2.5 km	MPC · JPL
85230	1993 FM_{52}	—	March 17, 1993	La Silla	UESAC	·	4.6 km	MPC · JPL
85231	1993 FR_{52}	—	March 17, 1993	La Silla	UESAC	·	1.6 km	MPC · JPL
85232	1993 FT_{52}	—	March 17, 1993	La Silla	UESAC	NYS	2.0 km	MPC · JPL
85233	1993 FA_{53}	—	March 17, 1993	La Silla	UESAC	·	1.7 km	MPC · JPL
85234	1993 HY_{2}	—	April 19, 1993	Kitt Peak	Spacewatch	·	2.6 km	MPC · JPL
85235	1993 JA	—	May 13, 1993	Kitt Peak	Spacewatch	H	840 m	MPC · JPL
85236	1993 KH	—	May 24, 1993	Siding Spring	R. H. McNaught	APO · PHA	630 m	MPC · JPL
85237	1993 NE_{2}	—	July 12, 1993	La Silla	E. W. Elst	·	2.6 km	MPC · JPL
85238	1993 OU_{1}	—	July 25, 1993	Kitt Peak	Spacewatch	·	5.6 km	MPC · JPL
85239	1993 OB_{7}	—	July 20, 1993	La Silla	E. W. Elst	·	4.6 km	MPC · JPL
85240	1993 OT_{11}	—	July 19, 1993	La Silla	E. W. Elst	·	3.5 km	MPC · JPL
85241	1993 PC_{3}	—	August 14, 1993	Caussols	E. W. Elst	ERI	4.3 km	MPC · JPL
85242	1993 QP_{4}	—	August 18, 1993	Caussols	E. W. Elst	NYS	2.7 km	MPC · JPL
85243	1993 QG_{8}	—	August 20, 1993	La Silla	E. W. Elst	·	3.1 km	MPC · JPL
85244	1993 QB_{9}	—	August 20, 1993	La Silla	E. W. Elst	·	2.8 km	MPC · JPL
85245	1993 RM_{2}	—	September 14, 1993	Palomar	E. F. Helin	·	4.4 km	MPC · JPL
85246	1993 RL_{4}	—	September 15, 1993	La Silla	E. W. Elst	·	5.3 km	MPC · JPL
85247	1993 RE_{5}	—	September 15, 1993	La Silla	E. W. Elst	NYS	2.3 km	MPC · JPL
85248	1993 RR_{6}	—	September 15, 1993	La Silla	E. W. Elst	·	3.4 km	MPC · JPL
85249	1993 RT_{11}	—	September 14, 1993	La Silla	H. Debehogne, E. W. Elst	NYS	2.8 km	MPC · JPL
85250	1993 RQ_{16}	—	September 15, 1993	La Silla	H. Debehogne, E. W. Elst	·	5.3 km	MPC · JPL
85251	1993 RJ_{18}	—	September 15, 1993	La Silla	H. Debehogne, E. W. Elst	·	4.7 km	MPC · JPL
85252	1993 SX_{12}	—	September 16, 1993	La Silla	H. Debehogne, E. W. Elst	·	1.2 km	MPC · JPL
85253	1993 TD_{5}	—	October 8, 1993	Kitt Peak	Spacewatch	·	2.0 km	MPC · JPL
85254	1993 TG_{12}	—	October 14, 1993	Palomar	H. E. Holt	·	4.7 km	MPC · JPL
85255	1993 TZ_{13}	—	October 9, 1993	La Silla	E. W. Elst	·	7.0 km	MPC · JPL
85256	1993 TC_{14}	—	October 9, 1993	La Silla	E. W. Elst	THM	3.9 km	MPC · JPL
85257	1993 TT_{14}	—	October 9, 1993	La Silla	E. W. Elst	(7744)	2.9 km	MPC · JPL
85258	1993 TE_{16}	—	October 9, 1993	La Silla	E. W. Elst	·	1.5 km	MPC · JPL
85259	1993 TO_{19}	—	October 9, 1993	La Silla	E. W. Elst	·	4.7 km	MPC · JPL
85260	1993 TC_{23}	—	October 9, 1993	La Silla	E. W. Elst	fast	5.9 km	MPC · JPL
85261	1993 TO_{23}	—	October 9, 1993	La Silla	E. W. Elst	·	1.4 km	MPC · JPL
85262	1993 TE_{32}	—	October 9, 1993	La Silla	E. W. Elst	NYS	2.9 km	MPC · JPL
85263	1993 TU_{37}	—	October 9, 1993	La Silla	E. W. Elst	·	2.5 km	MPC · JPL
85264	1993 TN_{46}	—	October 11, 1993	La Silla	E. W. Elst	NYS	2.3 km	MPC · JPL
85265	1993 VR	—	November 14, 1993	Oizumi	T. Kobayashi	EUN ·	3.0 km	MPC · JPL
85266	1993 YK_{1}	—	December 16, 1993	Kitt Peak	Spacewatch	AST	4.8 km	MPC · JPL
85267 Taj Mahal	1994 AD_{2}	Taj Mahal	January 12, 1994	Colleverde	V. S. Casulli	HNS	3.2 km	MPC · JPL
85268	1994 AK_{5}	—	January 5, 1994	Kitt Peak	Spacewatch	THM	5.2 km	MPC · JPL
85269	1994 AV_{5}	—	January 6, 1994	Kitt Peak	Spacewatch	·	3.0 km	MPC · JPL
85270	1994 AY_{5}	—	January 6, 1994	Kitt Peak	Spacewatch	·	1.6 km	MPC · JPL
85271	1994 AH_{14}	—	January 13, 1994	Kitt Peak	Spacewatch	·	2.1 km	MPC · JPL
85272	1994 BE_{2}	—	January 18, 1994	Kitt Peak	Spacewatch	·	4.6 km	MPC · JPL
85273	1994 CW_{13}	—	February 8, 1994	La Silla	E. W. Elst	PHO	2.2 km	MPC · JPL
85274	1994 GH	—	April 3, 1994	Kitt Peak	Spacewatch	·	1.2 km	MPC · JPL
85275	1994 LY	—	June 11, 1994	Palomar	E. F. Helin	AMO +1km	2.5 km	MPC · JPL
85276	1994 PY_{4}	—	August 10, 1994	La Silla	E. W. Elst	·	3.3 km	MPC · JPL
85277	1994 PH_{5}	—	August 10, 1994	La Silla	E. W. Elst	·	2.0 km	MPC · JPL
85278	1994 PU_{8}	—	August 10, 1994	La Silla	E. W. Elst	·	3.2 km	MPC · JPL
85279	1994 PM_{10}	—	August 10, 1994	La Silla	E. W. Elst	·	2.2 km	MPC · JPL
85280	1994 PU_{14}	—	August 10, 1994	La Silla	E. W. Elst	·	5.2 km	MPC · JPL
85281	1994 PZ_{16}	—	August 10, 1994	La Silla	E. W. Elst	·	1.7 km	MPC · JPL
85282	1994 PE_{19}	—	August 12, 1994	La Silla	E. W. Elst	HYG	7.1 km	MPC · JPL
85283	1994 PO_{21}	—	August 12, 1994	La Silla	E. W. Elst	THM	5.7 km	MPC · JPL
85284	1994 PT_{21}	—	August 12, 1994	La Silla	E. W. Elst	·	1.8 km	MPC · JPL
85285	1994 PE_{23}	—	August 12, 1994	La Silla	E. W. Elst	·	1.2 km	MPC · JPL
85286	1994 PA_{27}	—	August 12, 1994	La Silla	E. W. Elst	·	2.2 km	MPC · JPL
85287	1994 PM_{29}	—	August 12, 1994	La Silla	E. W. Elst	HYG	5.7 km	MPC · JPL
85288	1994 PC_{30}	—	August 12, 1994	La Silla	E. W. Elst	·	2.5 km	MPC · JPL
85289	1994 PJ_{32}	—	August 12, 1994	La Silla	E. W. Elst	EOS	3.8 km	MPC · JPL
85290	1994 PZ_{32}	—	August 12, 1994	La Silla	E. W. Elst	·	4.6 km	MPC · JPL
85291	1994 PF_{33}	—	August 10, 1994	La Silla	E. W. Elst	·	1.6 km	MPC · JPL
85292	1994 RA_{18}	—	September 3, 1994	La Silla	E. W. Elst	·	2.6 km	MPC · JPL
85293 Tengzhou	1994 RC_{25}	Tengzhou	September 12, 1994	Xinglong	SCAP	·	6.3 km	MPC · JPL
85294	1994 SO_{9}	—	September 28, 1994	Kitt Peak	Spacewatch	NYS	2.3 km	MPC · JPL
85295	1994 TY	—	October 2, 1994	Kitami	K. Endate, K. Watanabe	·	6.5 km	MPC · JPL
85296	1994 TT_{7}	—	October 6, 1994	Kitt Peak	Spacewatch	·	1.1 km	MPC · JPL
85297	1994 TJ_{8}	—	October 6, 1994	Kitt Peak	Spacewatch	·	1.1 km	MPC · JPL
85298	1994 TF_{10}	—	October 8, 1994	Kitt Peak	Spacewatch	·	2.4 km	MPC · JPL
85299 Neander	1994 TM_{16}	Neander	October 5, 1994	Tautenburg Observatory	F. Börngen	MAS	1.7 km	MPC · JPL
85300	1994 UW_{2}	—	October 30, 1994	Palomar	E. F. Helin	PHO	3.4 km	MPC · JPL

== 85301–85400 ==
back to top

Designation			Discovery			Properties		Ref
Permanent	Provisional	Named after	Date	Site	Discoverer(s)	Category	Diam.	Ref
85301	1994 UM_{5}	—	October 28, 1994	Kitt Peak	Spacewatch	·	3.8 km	MPC · JPL
85302	1994 VM	—	November 1, 1994	Oizumi	T. Kobayashi	·	2.0 km	MPC · JPL
85303	1994 VN_{1}	—	November 4, 1994	Oizumi	T. Kobayashi	·	1.7 km	MPC · JPL
85304	1994 VS_{1}	—	November 3, 1994	Oizumi	T. Kobayashi	·	6.4 km	MPC · JPL
85305	1994 VX_{4}	—	November 5, 1994	Kitt Peak	Spacewatch	·	2.5 km	MPC · JPL
85306	1994 VL_{8}	—	November 7, 1994	Palomar	C. S. Shoemaker	H	1.8 km	MPC · JPL
85307	1994 WN	—	November 25, 1994	Oizumi	T. Kobayashi	·	2.7 km	MPC · JPL
85308 Atsushimori	1994 WG_{4}	Atsushimori	November 30, 1994	Kuma Kogen	A. Nakamura	(2076)	1.4 km	MPC · JPL
85309	1994 WO_{4}	—	November 26, 1994	Kitt Peak	Spacewatch	·	2.9 km	MPC · JPL
85310	1994 WH_{5}	—	November 28, 1994	Kitt Peak	Spacewatch	·	1.7 km	MPC · JPL
85311	1994 WK_{8}	—	November 28, 1994	Kitt Peak	Spacewatch	·	3.7 km	MPC · JPL
85312	1994 YB_{1}	—	December 28, 1994	Oizumi	T. Kobayashi	·	10 km	MPC · JPL
85313	1994 YU_{1}	—	December 31, 1994	Oizumi	T. Kobayashi	·	2.8 km	MPC · JPL
85314	1995 AY_{1}	—	January 7, 1995	Kitt Peak	Spacewatch	·	3.0 km	MPC · JPL
85315	1995 BE	—	January 20, 1995	Oizumi	T. Kobayashi	(5)	2.6 km	MPC · JPL
85316	1995 BA_{4}	—	January 28, 1995	Kitt Peak	S. M. Larson, C. W. Hergenrother	(5)	2.8 km	MPC · JPL
85317 Lehár	1995 BB_{16}	Lehár	January 30, 1995	Tautenburg Observatory	F. Börngen	·	2.8 km	MPC · JPL
85318	1995 DX_{4}	—	February 21, 1995	Kitt Peak	Spacewatch	·	3.2 km	MPC · JPL
85319	1995 EJ_{4}	—	March 2, 1995	Kitt Peak	Spacewatch	·	3.8 km	MPC · JPL
85320 Bertram	1995 EP_{8}	Bertram	March 4, 1995	Tautenburg Observatory	F. Börngen	·	3.7 km	MPC · JPL
85321	1995 FK_{7}	—	March 25, 1995	Kitt Peak	Spacewatch	·	3.1 km	MPC · JPL
85322	1995 GS_{5}	—	April 6, 1995	Kitt Peak	Spacewatch	·	5.8 km	MPC · JPL
85323	1995 GF_{8}	—	April 8, 1995	Kitt Peak	T. J. Balonek	HYG	6.2 km	MPC · JPL
85324	1995 HX_{2}	—	April 25, 1995	Kitt Peak	Spacewatch	·	4.2 km	MPC · JPL
85325	1995 MO_{1}	—	June 22, 1995	Kitt Peak	Spacewatch	·	5.4 km	MPC · JPL
85326	1995 OR_{6}	—	July 24, 1995	Kitt Peak	Spacewatch	·	7.2 km	MPC · JPL
85327	1995 OR_{15}	—	July 26, 1995	Kitt Peak	Spacewatch	·	4.2 km	MPC · JPL
85328	1995 PA	—	August 1, 1995	Kleť	M. Tichý, Z. Moravec	NYS	2.6 km	MPC · JPL
85329	1995 PQ	—	August 2, 1995	Nachi-Katsuura	Y. Shimizu, T. Urata	·	6.0 km	MPC · JPL
85330	1995 QO	—	August 23, 1995	Ondřejov	L. Kotková	(32418)	2.1 km	MPC · JPL
85331	1995 QA_{13}	—	August 22, 1995	Kitt Peak	Spacewatch	·	5.5 km	MPC · JPL
85332	1995 SH_{4}	—	September 29, 1995	Catalina Station	T. B. Spahr	·	2.2 km	MPC · JPL
85333	1995 SN_{13}	—	September 18, 1995	Kitt Peak	Spacewatch	·	4.4 km	MPC · JPL
85334	1995 SY_{13}	—	September 18, 1995	Kitt Peak	Spacewatch	·	1.1 km	MPC · JPL
85335	1995 SB_{15}	—	September 18, 1995	Kitt Peak	Spacewatch	PAD	5.1 km	MPC · JPL
85336	1995 SJ_{27}	—	September 19, 1995	Kitt Peak	Spacewatch	·	3.4 km	MPC · JPL
85337	1995 SW_{34}	—	September 22, 1995	Kitt Peak	Spacewatch	·	1.8 km	MPC · JPL
85338	1995 SX_{37}	—	September 24, 1995	Kitt Peak	Spacewatch	fast	2.4 km	MPC · JPL
85339	1995 ST_{38}	—	September 24, 1995	Kitt Peak	Spacewatch	·	4.5 km	MPC · JPL
85340	1995 SV_{42}	—	September 25, 1995	Kitt Peak	Spacewatch	THM	5.1 km	MPC · JPL
85341	1995 SL_{49}	—	September 22, 1995	Kitt Peak	Spacewatch	·	5.5 km	MPC · JPL
85342	1995 SP_{52}	—	September 29, 1995	Kitt Peak	Spacewatch	·	1.3 km	MPC · JPL
85343	1995 SX_{53}	—	September 30, 1995	Catalina Station	C. W. Hergenrother	·	2.5 km	MPC · JPL
85344	1995 SB_{64}	—	September 26, 1995	Kitt Peak	Spacewatch	AGN	2.0 km	MPC · JPL
85345	1995 SH_{65}	—	September 25, 1995	Kitt Peak	Spacewatch	·	4.4 km	MPC · JPL
85346	1995 SE_{71}	—	September 19, 1995	Kitt Peak	Spacewatch	·	4.1 km	MPC · JPL
85347	1995 SU_{82}	—	September 23, 1995	Kitt Peak	Spacewatch	V	1.4 km	MPC · JPL
85348	1995 SV_{82}	—	September 23, 1995	Kitt Peak	Spacewatch	·	3.9 km	MPC · JPL
85349	1995 UP_{11}	—	October 17, 1995	Kitt Peak	Spacewatch	·	4.0 km	MPC · JPL
85350	1995 UN_{13}	—	October 17, 1995	Kitt Peak	Spacewatch	KOR	2.7 km	MPC · JPL
85351	1995 UC_{18}	—	October 18, 1995	Kitt Peak	Spacewatch	·	4.5 km	MPC · JPL
85352	1995 UR_{43}	—	October 25, 1995	Kitt Peak	Spacewatch	·	2.2 km	MPC · JPL
85353	1995 UE_{46}	—	October 20, 1995	Caussols	E. W. Elst	·	1.5 km	MPC · JPL
85354	1995 UA_{67}	—	October 17, 1995	Kitt Peak	Spacewatch	·	1.9 km	MPC · JPL
85355	1995 VN_{17}	—	November 15, 1995	Kitt Peak	Spacewatch	·	3.9 km	MPC · JPL
85356	1995 WA_{3}	—	November 20, 1995	Farra d'Isonzo	Farra d'Isonzo	·	2.6 km	MPC · JPL
85357	1995 WW_{9}	—	November 16, 1995	Kitt Peak	Spacewatch	V	1.4 km	MPC · JPL
85358	1995 WJ_{12}	—	November 16, 1995	Kitt Peak	Spacewatch	·	2.5 km	MPC · JPL
85359	1995 WQ_{15}	—	November 17, 1995	Kitt Peak	Spacewatch	·	4.6 km	MPC · JPL
85360	1995 WM_{16}	—	November 17, 1995	Kitt Peak	Spacewatch	·	6.1 km	MPC · JPL
85361	1995 WO_{16}	—	November 17, 1995	Kitt Peak	Spacewatch	·	4.5 km	MPC · JPL
85362	1995 WR_{32}	—	November 20, 1995	Kitt Peak	Spacewatch	·	2.4 km	MPC · JPL
85363	1995 WY_{36}	—	November 21, 1995	Kitt Peak	Spacewatch	EOS	4.1 km	MPC · JPL
85364	1995 YD_{7}	—	December 16, 1995	Kitt Peak	Spacewatch	·	1.9 km	MPC · JPL
85365	1995 YB_{9}	—	December 18, 1995	Kitt Peak	Spacewatch	·	1.4 km	MPC · JPL
85366	1996 AY_{13}	—	January 15, 1996	Kitt Peak	Spacewatch	·	1.4 km	MPC · JPL
85367	1996 AO_{17}	—	January 13, 1996	Kitt Peak	Spacewatch	NYS	1.6 km	MPC · JPL
85368 Elisabettacioni	1996 CQ_{7}	Elisabettacioni	February 14, 1996	Cima Ekar	U. Munari, M. Tombelli	·	3.0 km	MPC · JPL
85369	1996 DX_{2}	—	February 26, 1996	Church Stretton	S. P. Laurie	·	2.3 km	MPC · JPL
85370	1996 EW_{7}	—	March 11, 1996	Kitt Peak	Spacewatch	MAS	1.2 km	MPC · JPL
85371	1996 EV_{8}	—	March 12, 1996	Kitt Peak	Spacewatch	·	3.1 km	MPC · JPL
85372	1996 EO_{12}	—	March 13, 1996	Kitt Peak	Spacewatch	·	2.2 km	MPC · JPL
85373	1996 FC_{1}	—	March 19, 1996	Haleakala	NEAT	·	2.0 km	MPC · JPL
85374	1996 FC_{4}	—	March 22, 1996	Haleakala	AMOS	·	4.0 km	MPC · JPL
85375	1996 GY_{4}	—	April 11, 1996	Kitt Peak	Spacewatch	·	4.0 km	MPC · JPL
85376	1996 GU_{14}	—	April 12, 1996	Kitt Peak	Spacewatch	·	2.9 km	MPC · JPL
85377	1996 GZ_{17}	—	April 15, 1996	La Silla	E. W. Elst	·	2.6 km	MPC · JPL
85378	1996 GD_{19}	—	April 15, 1996	La Silla	E. W. Elst	·	1.9 km	MPC · JPL
85379	1996 HY_{24}	—	April 20, 1996	La Silla	E. W. Elst	NYS ·	3.5 km	MPC · JPL
85380	1996 JS	—	May 13, 1996	Haleakala	NEAT	·	3.3 km	MPC · JPL
85381	1996 JL_{15}	—	May 13, 1996	Kitt Peak	Spacewatch	·	2.2 km	MPC · JPL
85382	1996 LJ_{2}	—	June 8, 1996	Kitt Peak	Spacewatch	PHO	3.0 km	MPC · JPL
85383	1996 MS	—	June 22, 1996	Haleakala	NEAT	·	2.3 km	MPC · JPL
85384	1996 NZ	—	July 14, 1996	Haleakala	NEAT	·	2.7 km	MPC · JPL
85385	1996 NJ_{5}	—	July 14, 1996	La Silla	E. W. Elst	·	4.4 km	MPC · JPL
85386 Payton	1996 OU_{2}	Payton	July 26, 1996	Haleakala	AMOS	·	5.1 km	MPC · JPL
85387	1996 PF_{7}	—	August 8, 1996	La Silla	E. W. Elst	·	4.7 km	MPC · JPL
85388 Sakazukiyama	1996 PU_{9}	Sakazukiyama	August 11, 1996	Nanyo	T. Okuni	·	1.8 km	MPC · JPL
85389 Rosenauer	1996 QE_{1}	Rosenauer	August 22, 1996	Kleť	J. Tichá, M. Tichý	·	2.8 km	MPC · JPL
85390	1996 QZ_{2}	—	August 18, 1996	Caussols	E. W. Elst	·	4.9 km	MPC · JPL
85391	1996 RW_{11}	—	September 8, 1996	Kitt Peak	Spacewatch	AGN	2.3 km	MPC · JPL
85392	1996 RR_{13}	—	September 8, 1996	Kitt Peak	Spacewatch	·	5.1 km	MPC · JPL
85393	1996 RF_{17}	—	September 13, 1996	Kitt Peak	Spacewatch	·	3.0 km	MPC · JPL
85394	1996 RT_{32}	—	September 15, 1996	La Silla	Uppsala-DLR Trojan Survey	L4	14 km	MPC · JPL
85395	1996 SQ_{4}	—	September 20, 1996	Xinglong	SCAP	BRU · slow	6.4 km	MPC · JPL
85396	1996 SB_{7}	—	September 21, 1996	Xinglong	SCAP	·	2.7 km	MPC · JPL
85397	1996 TN_{3}	—	October 6, 1996	King City, Ontario Observatory	Sandness, R. G.	EUN	3.1 km	MPC · JPL
85398	1996 TH_{6}	—	October 5, 1996	Xinglong	SCAP	·	2.3 km	MPC · JPL
85399	1996 TG_{8}	—	October 8, 1996	Haleakala	NEAT	·	5.5 km	MPC · JPL
85400 Shiratakachu	1996 TD_{10}	Shiratakachu	October 8, 1996	Nanyo	T. Okuni	·	2.3 km	MPC · JPL

== 85401–85500 ==
back to top

Designation			Discovery			Properties		Ref
Permanent	Provisional	Named after	Date	Site	Discoverer(s)	Category	Diam.	Ref
85401 Yamatenclub	1996 TW_{14}	Yamatenclub	October 9, 1996	Nanyo	T. Okuni	·	3.0 km	MPC · JPL
85402	1996 TO_{15}	—	October 4, 1996	Kleť	Kleť	·	3.9 km	MPC · JPL
85403	1996 TY_{27}	—	October 7, 1996	Kitt Peak	Spacewatch	·	5.1 km	MPC · JPL
85404	1996 TD_{33}	—	October 10, 1996	Kitt Peak	Spacewatch	DOR	6.3 km	MPC · JPL
85405	1996 TO_{39}	—	October 8, 1996	La Silla	E. W. Elst	·	3.1 km	MPC · JPL
85406	1996 TL_{45}	—	October 7, 1996	Kitt Peak	Spacewatch	·	5.2 km	MPC · JPL
85407	1996 TY_{45}	—	October 7, 1996	Kitt Peak	Spacewatch	KOR	2.2 km	MPC · JPL
85408	1996 TB_{55}	—	October 3, 1996	Xinglong	SCAP	·	3.0 km	MPC · JPL
85409	1996 UO_{2}	—	October 17, 1996	Kitt Peak	Spacewatch	·	2.8 km	MPC · JPL
85410 Ningda	1996 UJ_{4}	Ningda	October 29, 1996	Xinglong	SCAP	GAL	2.7 km	MPC · JPL
85411 Paulflora	1996 VA_{1}	Paulflora	November 3, 1996	Linz	E. Meyer, E. Obermair	·	2.8 km	MPC · JPL
85412	1996 VS_{10}	—	November 4, 1996	Kitt Peak	Spacewatch	·	2.1 km	MPC · JPL
85413	1996 VK_{11}	—	November 4, 1996	Kitt Peak	Spacewatch	EOS	2.9 km	MPC · JPL
85414	1996 VN_{17}	—	November 6, 1996	Kitt Peak	Spacewatch	KOR	2.5 km	MPC · JPL
85415	1996 VE_{38}	—	November 3, 1996	Kushiro	S. Ueda, H. Kaneda	·	6.1 km	MPC · JPL
85416	1996 XN_{2}	—	December 4, 1996	Kleť	Kleť	·	2.3 km	MPC · JPL
85417	1996 XQ_{3}	—	December 1, 1996	Kitt Peak	Spacewatch	·	3.1 km	MPC · JPL
85418	1996 XQ_{14}	—	December 9, 1996	Kitt Peak	Spacewatch	·	5.9 km	MPC · JPL
85419	1996 XX_{16}	—	December 4, 1996	Kitt Peak	Spacewatch	·	2.4 km	MPC · JPL
85420	1996 XB_{17}	—	December 4, 1996	Kitt Peak	Spacewatch	·	6.0 km	MPC · JPL
85421	1996 XL_{30}	—	December 15, 1996	Kitt Peak	Spacewatch	AEO	4.1 km	MPC · JPL
85422 Maedanaoe	1996 XV_{30}	Maedanaoe	December 13, 1996	Saji	Saji	JUN	2.6 km	MPC · JPL
85423	1996 XX_{36}	—	December 14, 1996	Kitt Peak	Spacewatch	LIX	5.9 km	MPC · JPL
85424	1997 AA_{3}	—	January 4, 1997	Oizumi	T. Kobayashi	TIR	9.1 km	MPC · JPL
85425	1997 AM_{3}	—	January 3, 1997	Kitt Peak	Spacewatch	·	2.6 km	MPC · JPL
85426	1997 AK_{12}	—	January 10, 1997	Prescott	P. G. Comba	·	3.1 km	MPC · JPL
85427	1997 AE_{13}	—	January 11, 1997	Oizumi	T. Kobayashi	·	3.1 km	MPC · JPL
85428	1997 AN_{16}	—	January 14, 1997	Kleť	Kleť	·	6.3 km	MPC · JPL
85429	1997 AJ_{18}	—	January 15, 1997	Kleť	Kleť	EOS	3.5 km	MPC · JPL
85430	1997 BW_{5}	—	January 31, 1997	Prescott	P. G. Comba	·	1.2 km	MPC · JPL
85431	1997 BE_{6}	—	January 31, 1997	Kitt Peak	Spacewatch	·	6.2 km	MPC · JPL
85432	1997 CK_{19}	—	February 4, 1997	Xinglong	SCAP	·	2.5 km	MPC · JPL
85433	1997 CJ_{22}	—	February 13, 1997	Sormano	M. Cavagna, A. Testa	·	2.3 km	MPC · JPL
85434	1997 CR_{24}	—	February 9, 1997	Kitt Peak	Spacewatch	EOS	3.1 km	MPC · JPL
85435	1997 EU_{3}	—	March 2, 1997	Kitt Peak	Spacewatch	·	1.4 km	MPC · JPL
85436	1997 EU_{16}	—	March 5, 1997	Kitt Peak	Spacewatch	·	4.7 km	MPC · JPL
85437	1997 EX_{31}	—	March 11, 1997	Kitt Peak	Spacewatch	·	1.4 km	MPC · JPL
85438	1997 EH_{37}	—	March 5, 1997	Socorro	LINEAR	·	1.5 km	MPC · JPL
85439 Barbero	1997 EP_{40}	Barbero	March 13, 1997	San Marcello	L. Tesi, G. Cattani	·	1.5 km	MPC · JPL
85440	1997 EB_{47}	—	March 12, 1997	La Silla	E. W. Elst	·	2.1 km	MPC · JPL
85441	1997 FX_{2}	—	March 31, 1997	Socorro	LINEAR	·	1.6 km	MPC · JPL
85442	1997 GW_{1}	—	April 7, 1997	Kitt Peak	Spacewatch	·	2.6 km	MPC · JPL
85443	1997 GZ_{4}	—	April 7, 1997	Kitt Peak	Spacewatch	·	1.7 km	MPC · JPL
85444	1997 GL_{6}	—	April 2, 1997	Socorro	LINEAR	·	2.3 km	MPC · JPL
85445	1997 GV_{7}	—	April 2, 1997	Socorro	LINEAR	·	2.3 km	MPC · JPL
85446	1997 GK_{9}	—	April 3, 1997	Socorro	LINEAR	·	1.8 km	MPC · JPL
85447	1997 GQ_{11}	—	April 3, 1997	Socorro	LINEAR	·	1.6 km	MPC · JPL
85448	1997 GR_{11}	—	April 3, 1997	Socorro	LINEAR	·	2.3 km	MPC · JPL
85449	1997 GA_{17}	—	April 3, 1997	Socorro	LINEAR	·	1.8 km	MPC · JPL
85450	1997 GB_{18}	—	April 3, 1997	Socorro	LINEAR	·	1.8 km	MPC · JPL
85451	1997 GC_{18}	—	April 3, 1997	Socorro	LINEAR	·	2.1 km	MPC · JPL
85452	1997 GA_{23}	—	April 6, 1997	Socorro	LINEAR	·	1.6 km	MPC · JPL
85453	1997 GF_{31}	—	April 12, 1997	Kitt Peak	Spacewatch	·	2.9 km	MPC · JPL
85454	1997 GH_{35}	—	April 6, 1997	Socorro	LINEAR	V	1.2 km	MPC · JPL
85455	1997 HJ	—	April 28, 1997	Kitt Peak	Spacewatch	·	2.0 km	MPC · JPL
85456	1997 HW	—	April 28, 1997	Kitt Peak	Spacewatch	·	1.5 km	MPC · JPL
85457	1997 HQ_{3}	—	April 29, 1997	Kitt Peak	Spacewatch	·	1.5 km	MPC · JPL
85458	1997 HD_{8}	—	April 30, 1997	Socorro	LINEAR	HYG	6.7 km	MPC · JPL
85459	1997 HZ_{10}	—	April 30, 1997	Socorro	LINEAR	·	2.8 km	MPC · JPL
85460	1997 HG_{12}	—	April 30, 1997	Socorro	LINEAR	·	1.5 km	MPC · JPL
85461	1997 HP_{12}	—	April 30, 1997	Socorro	LINEAR	·	1.6 km	MPC · JPL
85462	1997 HL_{13}	—	April 30, 1997	Socorro	LINEAR	V	1.2 km	MPC · JPL
85463	1997 JR_{1}	—	May 1, 1997	Caussols	ODAS	·	6.0 km	MPC · JPL
85464	1997 JH_{3}	—	May 3, 1997	Kitt Peak	Spacewatch	EOS	4.1 km	MPC · JPL
85465	1997 JE_{14}	—	May 11, 1997	Xinglong	SCAP	PHO	2.8 km	MPC · JPL
85466 Krastins	1997 JK_{15}	Krastins	May 3, 1997	La Silla	E. W. Elst	NEM	4.5 km	MPC · JPL
85467	1997 KK_{3}	—	May 31, 1997	Kitt Peak	Spacewatch	·	1.5 km	MPC · JPL
85468	1997 LP_{1}	—	June 1, 1997	Kitt Peak	Spacewatch	·	1.8 km	MPC · JPL
85469	1997 LJ_{2}	—	June 5, 1997	Kitt Peak	Spacewatch	·	2.8 km	MPC · JPL
85470	1997 LN_{2}	—	June 5, 1997	Kitt Peak	Spacewatch	·	8.2 km	MPC · JPL
85471 Maryam	1997 LD_{4}	Maryam	June 4, 1997	Needville	Needville	PHO	1.5 km	MPC · JPL
85472 Xizezong	1997 LF_{4}	Xizezong	June 9, 1997	Xinglong	SCAP	·	2.2 km	MPC · JPL
85473	1997 LV_{5}	—	June 12, 1997	Cloudcroft	W. Offutt	MAS	1.2 km	MPC · JPL
85474	1997 LN_{15}	—	June 8, 1997	La Silla	E. W. Elst	·	1.8 km	MPC · JPL
85475	1997 LH_{17}	—	June 8, 1997	La Silla	E. W. Elst	·	2.8 km	MPC · JPL
85476	1997 MY	—	June 26, 1997	Xinglong	SCAP	·	2.3 km	MPC · JPL
85477	1997 MQ_{2}	—	June 28, 1997	Socorro	LINEAR	MAS	1.4 km	MPC · JPL
85478	1997 MK_{5}	—	June 29, 1997	Socorro	LINEAR	MAS	1.6 km	MPC · JPL
85479	1997 NF_{3}	—	July 9, 1997	Ondřejov	L. Kotková	·	2.0 km	MPC · JPL
85480	1997 NB_{8}	—	July 9, 1997	Xinglong	SCAP	·	1.6 km	MPC · JPL
85481	1997 OG_{1}	—	July 27, 1997	Woomera	F. B. Zoltowski	·	2.2 km	MPC · JPL
85482	1997 PL_{2}	—	August 7, 1997	Rand	G. R. Viscome	·	2.9 km	MPC · JPL
85483	1997 QG_{2}	—	August 30, 1997	Haleakala	NEAT	·	4.7 km	MPC · JPL
85484	1997 QV_{2}	—	August 30, 1997	Ondřejov	P. Pravec, Tuma, D.	·	2.9 km	MPC · JPL
85485 Lisagermany	1997 RJ_{2}	Lisagermany	September 4, 1997	Caussols	ODAS	NYS ·	4.5 km	MPC · JPL
85486	1997 RG_{13}	—	September 6, 1997	Caussols	ODAS	NYS	2.1 km	MPC · JPL
85487	1997 SC_{1}	—	September 19, 1997	Xinglong	SCAP	NYS	1.7 km	MPC · JPL
85488	1997 SH_{2}	—	September 23, 1997	Prescott	P. G. Comba	·	1.7 km	MPC · JPL
85489	1997 SV_{2}	—	September 19, 1997	Xinglong	SCAP	·	8.5 km	MPC · JPL
85490	1997 SE_{5}	—	September 28, 1997	Haleakala	NEAT	T_{j} (2.66) · AMO +1km	3.9 km	MPC · JPL
85491	1997 SL_{11}	—	September 27, 1997	Kitt Peak	Spacewatch	·	2.6 km	MPC · JPL
85492	1997 SE_{19}	—	September 28, 1997	Kitt Peak	Spacewatch	·	2.1 km	MPC · JPL
85493	1997 SF_{19}	—	September 28, 1997	Kitt Peak	Spacewatch	·	2.1 km	MPC · JPL
85494	1997 TS	—	October 4, 1997	Modra	A. Galád, Pravda, A.	·	2.2 km	MPC · JPL
85495 Franciscabrel	1997 TT_{5}	Franciscabrel	October 2, 1997	Caussols	ODAS	NYS	2.7 km	MPC · JPL
85496	1997 TO_{6}	—	October 2, 1997	Caussols	ODAS	·	4.3 km	MPC · JPL
85497	1997 TP_{11}	—	October 7, 1997	Kitt Peak	Spacewatch	KOR	2.6 km	MPC · JPL
85498	1997 TQ_{12}	—	October 2, 1997	Kitt Peak	Spacewatch	L4	12 km	MPC · JPL
85499	1997 TH_{13}	—	October 3, 1997	Kitt Peak	Spacewatch	·	2.9 km	MPC · JPL
85500	1997 TP_{13}	—	October 3, 1997	Kitt Peak	Spacewatch	·	2.7 km	MPC · JPL

== 85501–85600 ==
back to top

Designation			Discovery			Properties		Ref
Permanent	Provisional	Named after	Date	Site	Discoverer(s)	Category	Diam.	Ref
85501	1997 TP_{23}	—	October 9, 1997	Kitt Peak	Spacewatch	·	4.3 km	MPC · JPL
85502	1997 TZ_{23}	—	October 11, 1997	Kitt Peak	Spacewatch	·	5.3 km	MPC · JPL
85503	1997 TF_{25}	—	October 10, 1997	Ondřejov	Ondřejov, Observatoř	·	2.6 km	MPC · JPL
85504	1997 TC_{26}	—	October 11, 1997	Xinglong	SCAP	·	3.3 km	MPC · JPL
85505	1997 UU_{3}	—	October 26, 1997	Oizumi	T. Kobayashi	·	7.4 km	MPC · JPL
85506	1997 UU_{4}	—	October 19, 1997	Xinglong	SCAP	·	2.8 km	MPC · JPL
85507	1997 UD_{5}	—	October 21, 1997	Xinglong	SCAP	EUN	2.8 km	MPC · JPL
85508	1997 UD_{7}	—	October 23, 1997	Kleť	Kleť	·	2.8 km	MPC · JPL
85509	1997 UY_{7}	—	October 28, 1997	Ondřejov	L. Kotková	·	2.3 km	MPC · JPL
85510	1997 UZ_{7}	—	October 29, 1997	Kleť	Kleť	PHO	4.6 km	MPC · JPL
85511 Celnik	1997 UR_{10}	Celnik	October 30, 1997	Solingen	Koch, B.	MAS	1.4 km	MPC · JPL
85512 Rieugnie	1997 UW_{10}	Rieugnie	October 29, 1997	Ramonville	Buil, C.	·	3.3 km	MPC · JPL
85513	1997 UE_{11}	—	October 31, 1997	Oohira	T. Urata	NYS	2.0 km	MPC · JPL
85514	1997 UD_{16}	—	October 23, 1997	Kitt Peak	Spacewatch	NYS	3.0 km	MPC · JPL
85515 Annakukharskaya	1997 UT_{24}	Annakukharskaya	October 26, 1997	Cima Ekar	U. Munari, M. Tombelli	·	2.3 km	MPC · JPL
85516 Vaclík	1997 VF	Vaclík	November 2, 1997	Kleť	J. Tichá, M. Tichý	ERI	2.5 km	MPC · JPL
85517	1997 VL_{1}	—	November 1, 1997	Oohira	T. Urata	·	2.3 km	MPC · JPL
85518	1997 VC_{3}	—	November 6, 1997	Oizumi	T. Kobayashi	·	2.7 km	MPC · JPL
85519	1997 VR_{8}	—	November 3, 1997	Xinglong	SCAP	·	3.5 km	MPC · JPL
85520	1997 WO_{2}	—	November 23, 1997	Oizumi	T. Kobayashi	·	2.6 km	MPC · JPL
85521	1997 WW_{2}	—	November 23, 1997	Oizumi	T. Kobayashi	NYS	1.9 km	MPC · JPL
85522	1997 WT_{4}	—	November 20, 1997	Kitt Peak	Spacewatch	·	3.1 km	MPC · JPL
85523	1997 WM_{5}	—	November 23, 1997	Kitt Peak	Spacewatch	·	4.2 km	MPC · JPL
85524	1997 WZ_{8}	—	November 21, 1997	Kitt Peak	Spacewatch	·	2.6 km	MPC · JPL
85525	1997 WJ_{10}	—	November 21, 1997	Kitt Peak	Spacewatch	·	3.0 km	MPC · JPL
85526	1997 WM_{10}	—	November 22, 1997	Kitt Peak	Spacewatch	·	3.1 km	MPC · JPL
85527	1997 WT_{10}	—	November 22, 1997	Kitt Peak	Spacewatch	KOR	2.1 km	MPC · JPL
85528	1997 WP_{12}	—	November 23, 1997	Kitt Peak	Spacewatch	·	5.1 km	MPC · JPL
85529	1997 WW_{12}	—	November 23, 1997	Kitt Peak	Spacewatch	V	1.5 km	MPC · JPL
85530	1997 WN_{15}	—	November 23, 1997	Kitt Peak	Spacewatch	NYS	2.1 km	MPC · JPL
85531	1997 WU_{17}	—	November 23, 1997	Kitt Peak	Spacewatch	·	4.2 km	MPC · JPL
85532	1997 WD_{21}	—	November 23, 1997	Nachi-Katsuura	Y. Shimizu, T. Urata	·	3.9 km	MPC · JPL
85533	1997 WM_{22}	—	November 28, 1997	Caussols	ODAS	·	2.8 km	MPC · JPL
85534	1997 WB_{26}	—	November 23, 1997	Kitt Peak	Spacewatch	MAS	2.1 km	MPC · JPL
85535	1997 WZ_{27}	—	November 29, 1997	Kitt Peak	Spacewatch	NYS	3.3 km	MPC · JPL
85536	1997 WN_{31}	—	November 29, 1997	Socorro	LINEAR	NYS	2.4 km	MPC · JPL
85537	1997 WP_{31}	—	November 29, 1997	Socorro	LINEAR	·	4.6 km	MPC · JPL
85538	1997 WW_{34}	—	November 29, 1997	Socorro	LINEAR	MRX	2.4 km	MPC · JPL
85539	1997 WG_{37}	—	November 29, 1997	Socorro	LINEAR	·	6.3 km	MPC · JPL
85540	1997 WP_{37}	—	November 29, 1997	Socorro	LINEAR	·	2.3 km	MPC · JPL
85541	1997 WX_{37}	—	November 29, 1997	Socorro	LINEAR	NYS	3.2 km	MPC · JPL
85542	1997 WU_{41}	—	November 29, 1997	Socorro	LINEAR	·	5.0 km	MPC · JPL
85543	1997 WP_{46}	—	November 26, 1997	Socorro	LINEAR	·	3.0 km	MPC · JPL
85544	1997 WJ_{50}	—	November 28, 1997	Xinglong	SCAP	·	4.6 km	MPC · JPL
85545	1997 WL_{55}	—	November 29, 1997	Socorro	LINEAR	·	7.8 km	MPC · JPL
85546	1997 XH_{1}	—	December 3, 1997	Oizumi	T. Kobayashi	·	2.4 km	MPC · JPL
85547	1997 XF_{10}	—	December 5, 1997	Cloudcroft	W. Offutt	·	2.5 km	MPC · JPL
85548	1997 XX_{13}	—	December 4, 1997	La Silla	Uppsala-DLR Trojan Survey	·	2.4 km	MPC · JPL
85549	1997 YH	—	December 18, 1997	Oizumi	T. Kobayashi	·	2.5 km	MPC · JPL
85550	1997 YW	—	December 20, 1997	Oizumi	T. Kobayashi	EUN	5.0 km	MPC · JPL
85551	1997 YZ_{1}	—	December 21, 1997	Oizumi	T. Kobayashi	NYS	2.8 km	MPC · JPL
85552	1997 YR_{7}	—	December 28, 1997	Oizumi	T. Kobayashi	MAR	3.3 km	MPC · JPL
85553	1997 YK_{10}	—	December 28, 1997	Oizumi	T. Kobayashi	·	4.3 km	MPC · JPL
85554	1997 YF_{14}	—	December 31, 1997	Oizumi	T. Kobayashi	(5)	2.1 km	MPC · JPL
85555	1997 YG_{14}	—	December 31, 1997	Oizumi	T. Kobayashi	MAR	3.7 km	MPC · JPL
85556	1997 YV_{16}	—	December 29, 1997	Xinglong	SCAP	·	2.5 km	MPC · JPL
85557	1997 YY_{16}	—	December 30, 1997	Xinglong	SCAP	(2076)	2.6 km	MPC · JPL
85558 Tianjinshida	1998 AB_{3}	Tianjinshida	January 3, 1998	Xinglong	SCAP	·	7.9 km	MPC · JPL
85559 Villecroze	1998 AC_{5}	Villecroze	January 8, 1998	NRC-DAO	Banh, S.	·	3.3 km	MPC · JPL
85560	1998 BN	—	January 18, 1998	Oizumi	T. Kobayashi	EOS	5.3 km	MPC · JPL
85561	1998 BF_{2}	—	January 20, 1998	Socorro	LINEAR	·	3.7 km	MPC · JPL
85562	1998 BC_{3}	—	January 18, 1998	Kitt Peak	Spacewatch	·	2.5 km	MPC · JPL
85563	1998 BF_{7}	—	January 24, 1998	Haleakala	NEAT	H	1.5 km	MPC · JPL
85564 Emilia	1998 BU_{7}	Emilia	January 17, 1998	Bologna	San Vittore	·	3.5 km	MPC · JPL
85565	1998 BD_{9}	—	January 25, 1998	Haleakala	NEAT	·	2.6 km	MPC · JPL
85566	1998 BM_{9}	—	January 18, 1998	Kitt Peak	Spacewatch	·	2.6 km	MPC · JPL
85567	1998 BU_{9}	—	January 22, 1998	Kitt Peak	Spacewatch	·	3.6 km	MPC · JPL
85568	1998 BN_{14}	—	January 17, 1998	Caussols	ODAS	·	2.8 km	MPC · JPL
85569	1998 BG_{18}	—	January 22, 1998	Kitt Peak	Spacewatch	KOR	2.6 km	MPC · JPL
85570	1998 BU_{20}	—	January 22, 1998	Kitt Peak	Spacewatch	·	2.9 km	MPC · JPL
85571	1998 BV_{21}	—	January 23, 1998	Kitt Peak	Spacewatch	·	9.0 km	MPC · JPL
85572	1998 BY_{28}	—	January 25, 1998	Kitt Peak	Spacewatch	·	8.2 km	MPC · JPL
85573	1998 CE	—	February 1, 1998	Kleť	J. Tichá, M. Tichý	KOR	2.8 km	MPC · JPL
85574	1998 CG	—	February 1, 1998	Kleť	J. Tichá, M. Tichý	·	4.1 km	MPC · JPL
85575	1998 DC_{1}	—	February 19, 1998	Modra	A. Galád, Pravda, A.	·	7.8 km	MPC · JPL
85576	1998 DH_{1}	—	February 19, 1998	Kleť	Kleť	·	5.7 km	MPC · JPL
85577	1998 DC_{2}	—	February 21, 1998	Modra	A. Galád, Pravda, A.	3:2	11 km	MPC · JPL
85578	1998 DP_{13}	—	February 26, 1998	Colleverde	V. S. Casulli	BAR	2.4 km	MPC · JPL
85579	1998 DQ_{19}	—	February 24, 1998	Kitt Peak	Spacewatch	(17392)	2.7 km	MPC · JPL
85580	1998 DO_{20}	—	February 28, 1998	Les Tardieux Obs.	Boeuf, M.	·	4.4 km	MPC · JPL
85581	1998 DZ_{20}	—	February 22, 1998	Kitt Peak	Spacewatch	EUN	4.8 km	MPC · JPL
85582	1998 DW_{24}	—	February 23, 1998	Kitt Peak	Spacewatch	EUN	2.4 km	MPC · JPL
85583	1998 EV_{10}	—	March 1, 1998	La Silla	E. W. Elst	·	6.8 km	MPC · JPL
85584	1998 EN_{20}	—	March 3, 1998	La Silla	E. W. Elst	·	3.5 km	MPC · JPL
85585 Mjolnir	1998 FG_{2}	Mjolnir	March 21, 1998	Goodricke-Pigott	R. A. Tucker	APO · PHA · critical	170 m	MPC · JPL
85586	1998 FP_{8}	—	March 21, 1998	Kitt Peak	Spacewatch	EUN	3.0 km	MPC · JPL
85587	1998 FE_{14}	—	March 25, 1998	Haleakala	NEAT	·	6.0 km	MPC · JPL
85588	1998 FA_{15}	—	March 25, 1998	Stroncone	Santa Lucia	MAR	4.1 km	MPC · JPL
85589	1998 FE_{25}	—	March 20, 1998	Socorro	LINEAR	EUN	4.4 km	MPC · JPL
85590	1998 FC_{39}	—	March 20, 1998	Socorro	LINEAR	·	4.5 km	MPC · JPL
85591	1998 FR_{46}	—	March 20, 1998	Socorro	LINEAR	(40134)	4.7 km	MPC · JPL
85592	1998 FN_{47}	—	March 20, 1998	Socorro	LINEAR	·	6.6 km	MPC · JPL
85593	1998 FD_{57}	—	March 20, 1998	Socorro	LINEAR	·	5.8 km	MPC · JPL
85594	1998 FT_{60}	—	March 20, 1998	Socorro	LINEAR	V	1.5 km	MPC · JPL
85595	1998 FB_{71}	—	March 20, 1998	Socorro	LINEAR	EUN ·	5.7 km	MPC · JPL
85596	1998 FU_{77}	—	March 24, 1998	Socorro	LINEAR	·	5.8 km	MPC · JPL
85597	1998 FF_{82}	—	March 24, 1998	Socorro	LINEAR	·	5.8 km	MPC · JPL
85598	1998 FZ_{86}	—	March 24, 1998	Socorro	LINEAR	·	3.8 km	MPC · JPL
85599	1998 FX_{87}	—	March 24, 1998	Socorro	LINEAR	·	2.3 km	MPC · JPL
85600	1998 FU_{93}	—	March 24, 1998	Socorro	LINEAR	·	7.5 km	MPC · JPL

== 85601–85700 ==
back to top

Designation			Discovery			Properties		Ref
Permanent	Provisional	Named after	Date	Site	Discoverer(s)	Category	Diam.	Ref
85601	1998 FU_{121}	—	March 20, 1998	Socorro	LINEAR	THM	6.7 km	MPC · JPL
85602	1998 FE_{122}	—	March 20, 1998	Socorro	LINEAR	·	3.1 km	MPC · JPL
85603	1998 FV_{122}	—	March 20, 1998	Socorro	LINEAR	·	3.2 km	MPC · JPL
85604	1998 FT_{125}	—	March 31, 1998	Socorro	LINEAR	BRA	2.8 km	MPC · JPL
85605	1998 FO_{132}	—	March 20, 1998	Socorro	LINEAR	·	8.6 km	MPC · JPL
85606	1998 FP_{139}	—	March 28, 1998	Socorro	LINEAR	THM	4.9 km	MPC · JPL
85607	1998 FV_{146}	—	March 25, 1998	Kitt Peak	Spacewatch	HYG	5.6 km	MPC · JPL
85608	1998 GC_{7}	—	April 2, 1998	Socorro	LINEAR	·	6.7 km	MPC · JPL
85609	1998 HZ_{8}	—	April 17, 1998	Kitt Peak	Spacewatch	·	1.6 km	MPC · JPL
85610	1998 HC_{11}	—	April 17, 1998	Kitt Peak	Spacewatch	HYG	5.7 km	MPC · JPL
85611	1998 HW_{16}	—	April 26, 1998	Kitt Peak	Spacewatch	·	2.2 km	MPC · JPL
85612	1998 HL_{23}	—	April 20, 1998	Socorro	LINEAR	·	4.0 km	MPC · JPL
85613	1998 HC_{33}	—	April 20, 1998	Socorro	LINEAR	·	7.4 km	MPC · JPL
85614	1998 HR_{36}	—	April 20, 1998	Socorro	LINEAR	·	6.4 km	MPC · JPL
85615	1998 HE_{37}	—	April 20, 1998	Socorro	LINEAR	·	2.9 km	MPC · JPL
85616	1998 HA_{42}	—	April 24, 1998	Kitt Peak	Spacewatch	·	4.7 km	MPC · JPL
85617	1998 HJ_{86}	—	April 21, 1998	Socorro	LINEAR	·	1.7 km	MPC · JPL
85618	1998 HM_{102}	—	April 25, 1998	La Silla	E. W. Elst	EUN	2.5 km	MPC · JPL
85619	1998 HQ_{106}	—	April 23, 1998	Socorro	LINEAR	·	4.0 km	MPC · JPL
85620	1998 HJ_{107}	—	April 23, 1998	Socorro	LINEAR	HYG	7.7 km	MPC · JPL
85621	1998 HS_{107}	—	April 23, 1998	Socorro	LINEAR	·	1.9 km	MPC · JPL
85622	1998 HP_{122}	—	April 23, 1998	Socorro	LINEAR	·	1.7 km	MPC · JPL
85623	1998 HL_{123}	—	April 23, 1998	Socorro	LINEAR	·	4.9 km	MPC · JPL
85624	1998 HU_{138}	—	April 21, 1998	Socorro	LINEAR	·	2.8 km	MPC · JPL
85625	1998 HW_{140}	—	April 21, 1998	Socorro	LINEAR	·	6.6 km	MPC · JPL
85626	1998 HM_{141}	—	April 21, 1998	Socorro	LINEAR	PHO	6.3 km	MPC · JPL
85627	1998 HP_{151}	—	April 28, 1998	Mauna Kea	Mauna Kea	cubewano (cold)	121 km	MPC · JPL
85628	1998 KV_{2}	—	May 22, 1998	Socorro	LINEAR	AMO +1km · moon	780 m	MPC · JPL
85629	1998 KW_{5}	—	May 24, 1998	Kitt Peak	Spacewatch	·	6.0 km	MPC · JPL
85630	1998 KP_{31}	—	May 22, 1998	Socorro	LINEAR	·	2.6 km	MPC · JPL
85631	1998 KX_{49}	—	May 23, 1998	Socorro	LINEAR	(18466)	5.6 km	MPC · JPL
85632	1998 KV_{52}	—	May 23, 1998	Socorro	LINEAR	·	8.4 km	MPC · JPL
85633	1998 KR_{65}	—	May 29, 1998	Cerro Tololo	Bernstein, G.	cubewano (cold)	154 km	MPC · JPL
85634	1998 LR_{2}	—	June 1, 1998	La Silla	E. W. Elst	·	1.5 km	MPC · JPL
85635	1998 MV_{1}	—	June 20, 1998	Kitt Peak	Spacewatch	·	4.0 km	MPC · JPL
85636	1998 MF_{5}	—	June 19, 1998	Kitt Peak	Spacewatch	·	7.0 km	MPC · JPL
85637	1998 MO_{12}	—	June 19, 1998	Socorro	LINEAR	·	6.2 km	MPC · JPL
85638	1998 ML_{35}	—	June 24, 1998	Socorro	LINEAR	·	8.8 km	MPC · JPL
85639	1998 OU	—	July 20, 1998	Caussols	ODAS	·	1.5 km	MPC · JPL
85640	1998 OX_{4}	—	July 26, 1998	Kitt Peak	Spacewatch	APO · PHA	210 m	MPC · JPL
85641	1998 OR_{5}	—	July 29, 1998	Caussols	ODAS	fast	2.3 km	MPC · JPL
85642	1998 OS_{8}	—	July 26, 1998	La Silla	E. W. Elst	·	2.1 km	MPC · JPL
85643	1998 OC_{10}	—	July 26, 1998	La Silla	E. W. Elst	·	8.7 km	MPC · JPL
85644	1998 OH_{10}	—	July 26, 1998	La Silla	E. W. Elst	·	3.0 km	MPC · JPL
85645	1998 OS_{11}	—	July 26, 1998	La Silla	E. W. Elst	·	5.6 km	MPC · JPL
85646	1998 OT_{14}	—	July 26, 1998	La Silla	E. W. Elst	(883)	2.7 km	MPC · JPL
85647	1998 PZ	—	August 14, 1998	Woomera	F. B. Zoltowski	·	1.9 km	MPC · JPL
85648	1998 PF_{1}	—	August 11, 1998	Mallorca	Á. López J.	slow	7.2 km	MPC · JPL
85649	1998 QZ_{1}	—	August 19, 1998	Haleakala	NEAT	·	1.6 km	MPC · JPL
85650	1998 QH_{6}	—	August 24, 1998	Caussols	ODAS	·	6.6 km	MPC · JPL
85651	1998 QR_{12}	—	August 17, 1998	Socorro	LINEAR	·	4.7 km	MPC · JPL
85652	1998 QQ_{13}	—	August 17, 1998	Socorro	LINEAR	TIR	8.1 km	MPC · JPL
85653	1998 QN_{16}	—	August 17, 1998	Socorro	LINEAR	·	2.1 km	MPC · JPL
85654	1998 QU_{17}	—	August 17, 1998	Socorro	LINEAR	·	7.5 km	MPC · JPL
85655	1998 QS_{18}	—	August 17, 1998	Socorro	LINEAR	·	1.9 km	MPC · JPL
85656	1998 QX_{18}	—	August 17, 1998	Socorro	LINEAR	·	1.7 km	MPC · JPL
85657	1998 QJ_{20}	—	August 17, 1998	Socorro	LINEAR	·	1.5 km	MPC · JPL
85658	1998 QS_{28}	—	August 22, 1998	Xinglong	SCAP	·	3.2 km	MPC · JPL
85659	1998 QU_{29}	—	August 23, 1998	Xinglong	SCAP	·	1.4 km	MPC · JPL
85660	1998 QX_{33}	—	August 17, 1998	Socorro	LINEAR	·	9.8 km	MPC · JPL
85661	1998 QY_{36}	—	August 17, 1998	Socorro	LINEAR	·	2.4 km	MPC · JPL
85662	1998 QL_{41}	—	August 17, 1998	Socorro	LINEAR	JUN	2.7 km	MPC · JPL
85663	1998 QX_{42}	—	August 17, 1998	Socorro	LINEAR	·	1.8 km	MPC · JPL
85664	1998 QF_{43}	—	August 17, 1998	Socorro	LINEAR	·	1.7 km	MPC · JPL
85665	1998 QG_{46}	—	August 17, 1998	Socorro	LINEAR	THM	6.5 km	MPC · JPL
85666	1998 QP_{50}	—	August 17, 1998	Socorro	LINEAR	·	2.1 km	MPC · JPL
85667	1998 QT_{52}	—	August 20, 1998	Anderson Mesa	LONEOS	·	7.1 km	MPC · JPL
85668	1998 QH_{53}	—	August 20, 1998	Anderson Mesa	LONEOS	(5)	3.0 km	MPC · JPL
85669	1998 QK_{55}	—	August 26, 1998	Caussols	ODAS	·	1.8 km	MPC · JPL
85670	1998 QZ_{57}	—	August 30, 1998	Kitt Peak	Spacewatch	·	1.0 km	MPC · JPL
85671	1998 QH_{67}	—	August 24, 1998	Socorro	LINEAR	EUP	9.6 km	MPC · JPL
85672	1998 QS_{95}	—	August 19, 1998	Socorro	LINEAR	EUP	7.6 km	MPC · JPL
85673	1998 QB_{102}	—	August 26, 1998	La Silla	E. W. Elst	·	2.3 km	MPC · JPL
85674	1998 QD_{103}	—	August 26, 1998	La Silla	E. W. Elst	·	1.9 km	MPC · JPL
85675	1998 RC_{2}	—	September 3, 1998	Woomera	F. B. Zoltowski	·	9.0 km	MPC · JPL
85676	1998 RT_{2}	—	September 13, 1998	Kitt Peak	Spacewatch	MAS	1.3 km	MPC · JPL
85677	1998 RU_{2}	—	September 13, 1998	Kitt Peak	Spacewatch	MAS	1.2 km	MPC · JPL
85678	1998 RZ_{7}	—	September 12, 1998	Kitt Peak	Spacewatch	·	4.4 km	MPC · JPL
85679	1998 RA_{15}	—	September 15, 1998	Kitt Peak	Spacewatch	·	5.2 km	MPC · JPL
85680	1998 RS_{21}	—	September 15, 1998	Kitt Peak	Spacewatch	·	5.6 km	MPC · JPL
85681	1998 RR_{25}	—	September 14, 1998	Socorro	LINEAR	PHO	2.7 km	MPC · JPL
85682	1998 RJ_{29}	—	September 14, 1998	Socorro	LINEAR	·	1.7 km	MPC · JPL
85683	1998 RE_{32}	—	September 14, 1998	Socorro	LINEAR	·	2.2 km	MPC · JPL
85684	1998 RN_{41}	—	September 14, 1998	Socorro	LINEAR	·	1.8 km	MPC · JPL
85685	1998 RT_{42}	—	September 14, 1998	Socorro	LINEAR	·	1.8 km	MPC · JPL
85686	1998 RC_{44}	—	September 14, 1998	Socorro	LINEAR	(5)	1.9 km	MPC · JPL
85687	1998 RF_{55}	—	September 14, 1998	Socorro	LINEAR	·	2.3 km	MPC · JPL
85688	1998 RN_{55}	—	September 14, 1998	Socorro	LINEAR	·	1.7 km	MPC · JPL
85689	1998 RT_{55}	—	September 14, 1998	Socorro	LINEAR	HOF	6.6 km	MPC · JPL
85690	1998 RG_{56}	—	September 14, 1998	Socorro	LINEAR	·	1.2 km	MPC · JPL
85691	1998 RH_{57}	—	September 14, 1998	Socorro	LINEAR	·	2.9 km	MPC · JPL
85692	1998 RQ_{57}	—	September 14, 1998	Socorro	LINEAR	·	3.1 km	MPC · JPL
85693	1998 RK_{59}	—	September 14, 1998	Socorro	LINEAR	·	2.1 km	MPC · JPL
85694	1998 RK_{60}	—	September 14, 1998	Socorro	LINEAR	·	6.8 km	MPC · JPL
85695	1998 RE_{61}	—	September 14, 1998	Socorro	LINEAR	·	2.1 km	MPC · JPL
85696	1998 RU_{62}	—	September 14, 1998	Socorro	LINEAR	·	2.1 km	MPC · JPL
85697	1998 RG_{68}	—	September 14, 1998	Socorro	LINEAR	·	1.9 km	MPC · JPL
85698	1998 RB_{69}	—	September 14, 1998	Socorro	LINEAR	·	2.1 km	MPC · JPL
85699	1998 RX_{69}	—	September 14, 1998	Socorro	LINEAR	NYS	2.2 km	MPC · JPL
85700	1998 RT_{70}	—	September 14, 1998	Socorro	LINEAR	·	5.5 km	MPC · JPL

== 85701–85800 ==
back to top

Designation			Discovery			Properties		Ref
Permanent	Provisional	Named after	Date	Site	Discoverer(s)	Category	Diam.	Ref
85701	1998 RV_{73}	—	September 14, 1998	Socorro	LINEAR	·	3.5 km	MPC · JPL
85702	1998 RA_{74}	—	September 14, 1998	Socorro	LINEAR	·	1.8 km	MPC · JPL
85703	1998 RC_{75}	—	September 14, 1998	Socorro	LINEAR	·	6.3 km	MPC · JPL
85704	1998 SV_{19}	—	September 20, 1998	Kitt Peak	Spacewatch	·	1.6 km	MPC · JPL
85705	1998 SO_{21}	—	September 21, 1998	Kitt Peak	Spacewatch	·	4.3 km	MPC · JPL
85706	1998 SB_{27}	—	September 20, 1998	Xinglong	SCAP	·	1.4 km	MPC · JPL
85707	1998 SU_{33}	—	September 26, 1998	Socorro	LINEAR	PHO	2.3 km	MPC · JPL
85708	1998 SL_{35}	—	September 27, 1998	Baton Rouge	W. R. Cooney Jr., Wefel, K.	·	2.4 km	MPC · JPL
85709	1998 SG_{36}	—	September 26, 1998	Socorro	LINEAR	AMO +1km	2.2 km	MPC · JPL
85710	1998 SP_{38}	—	September 23, 1998	Kitt Peak	Spacewatch	·	3.5 km	MPC · JPL
85711	1998 SP_{43}	—	September 25, 1998	Xinglong	SCAP	·	2.1 km	MPC · JPL
85712	1998 SA_{45}	—	September 25, 1998	Kitt Peak	Spacewatch	·	1.5 km	MPC · JPL
85713	1998 SS_{49}	—	September 29, 1998	Socorro	LINEAR	APO +1km · PHA	3.5 km	MPC · JPL
85714	1998 SU_{49}	—	September 26, 1998	Socorro	LINEAR	·	5.5 km	MPC · JPL
85715	1998 SB_{54}	—	September 16, 1998	Anderson Mesa	LONEOS	·	2.0 km	MPC · JPL
85716	1998 SG_{56}	—	September 16, 1998	Anderson Mesa	LONEOS	·	19 km	MPC · JPL
85717	1998 SY_{56}	—	September 17, 1998	Anderson Mesa	LONEOS	·	1.9 km	MPC · JPL
85718	1998 SG_{58}	—	September 17, 1998	Anderson Mesa	LONEOS	V	1.4 km	MPC · JPL
85719	1998 SV_{59}	—	September 17, 1998	Anderson Mesa	LONEOS	MIS	5.4 km	MPC · JPL
85720	1998 SK_{60}	—	September 17, 1998	Anderson Mesa	LONEOS	·	2.8 km	MPC · JPL
85721	1998 SL_{63}	—	September 29, 1998	Xinglong	SCAP	·	1.9 km	MPC · JPL
85722	1998 SX_{63}	—	September 20, 1998	La Silla	E. W. Elst	·	5.0 km	MPC · JPL
85723	1998 SH_{67}	—	September 20, 1998	La Silla	E. W. Elst	·	2.3 km	MPC · JPL
85724	1998 SN_{68}	—	September 19, 1998	Socorro	LINEAR	·	2.5 km	MPC · JPL
85725	1998 SV_{68}	—	September 19, 1998	Socorro	LINEAR	V	1.4 km	MPC · JPL
85726	1998 SF_{71}	—	September 26, 1998	Socorro	LINEAR	·	1.3 km	MPC · JPL
85727	1998 SC_{75}	—	September 21, 1998	La Silla	E. W. Elst	·	2.5 km	MPC · JPL
85728 Yangfujia	1998 SR_{75}	Yangfujia	September 17, 1998	Xinglong	SCAP	·	1.2 km	MPC · JPL
85729	1998 SV_{76}	—	September 26, 1998	Socorro	LINEAR	·	4.0 km	MPC · JPL
85730	1998 SQ_{77}	—	September 26, 1998	Socorro	LINEAR	·	1.6 km	MPC · JPL
85731	1998 SP_{80}	—	September 26, 1998	Socorro	LINEAR	(2076)	2.7 km	MPC · JPL
85732	1998 SJ_{82}	—	September 26, 1998	Socorro	LINEAR	·	6.4 km	MPC · JPL
85733	1998 ST_{90}	—	September 26, 1998	Socorro	LINEAR	·	2.9 km	MPC · JPL
85734	1998 SK_{92}	—	September 26, 1998	Socorro	LINEAR	·	1.9 km	MPC · JPL
85735	1998 SF_{95}	—	September 26, 1998	Socorro	LINEAR	(883)	2.3 km	MPC · JPL
85736	1998 SW_{96}	—	September 26, 1998	Socorro	LINEAR	·	5.1 km	MPC · JPL
85737	1998 SE_{98}	—	September 26, 1998	Socorro	LINEAR	V	1.2 km	MPC · JPL
85738	1998 SZ_{103}	—	September 26, 1998	Socorro	LINEAR	·	2.1 km	MPC · JPL
85739	1998 SF_{105}	—	September 26, 1998	Socorro	LINEAR	NYS	3.4 km	MPC · JPL
85740	1998 SO_{106}	—	September 26, 1998	Socorro	LINEAR	·	1.5 km	MPC · JPL
85741	1998 SL_{107}	—	September 26, 1998	Socorro	LINEAR	·	2.6 km	MPC · JPL
85742	1998 SM_{111}	—	September 26, 1998	Socorro	LINEAR	·	2.4 km	MPC · JPL
85743	1998 SU_{113}	—	September 26, 1998	Socorro	LINEAR	·	2.4 km	MPC · JPL
85744	1998 SG_{117}	—	September 26, 1998	Socorro	LINEAR	·	2.0 km	MPC · JPL
85745	1998 SH_{127}	—	September 26, 1998	Socorro	LINEAR	·	5.3 km	MPC · JPL
85746	1998 SP_{130}	—	September 26, 1998	Socorro	LINEAR	·	1.9 km	MPC · JPL
85747	1998 SL_{132}	—	September 26, 1998	Socorro	LINEAR	·	2.6 km	MPC · JPL
85748	1998 SK_{138}	—	September 26, 1998	Socorro	LINEAR	NYS	1.7 km	MPC · JPL
85749	1998 SH_{140}	—	September 26, 1998	Socorro	LINEAR	(5)	2.1 km	MPC · JPL
85750	1998 SE_{141}	—	September 26, 1998	Socorro	LINEAR	EUN	2.4 km	MPC · JPL
85751	1998 SU_{144}	—	September 20, 1998	La Silla	E. W. Elst	·	2.1 km	MPC · JPL
85752	1998 SC_{153}	—	September 26, 1998	Socorro	LINEAR	NYS	1.7 km	MPC · JPL
85753	1998 SV_{153}	—	September 26, 1998	Socorro	LINEAR	·	2.0 km	MPC · JPL
85754	1998 SJ_{156}	—	September 26, 1998	Socorro	LINEAR	·	6.6 km	MPC · JPL
85755	1998 SK_{156}	—	September 26, 1998	Socorro	LINEAR	AGN	2.5 km	MPC · JPL
85756	1998 SD_{157}	—	September 26, 1998	Socorro	LINEAR	KOR	3.4 km	MPC · JPL
85757	1998 SN_{157}	—	September 26, 1998	Socorro	LINEAR	·	2.5 km	MPC · JPL
85758	1998 SK_{160}	—	September 26, 1998	Socorro	LINEAR	·	2.8 km	MPC · JPL
85759	1998 ST_{161}	—	September 26, 1998	Socorro	LINEAR	·	3.0 km	MPC · JPL
85760	1998 SG_{170}	—	September 19, 1998	Anderson Mesa	LONEOS	·	2.9 km	MPC · JPL
85761	1998 SC_{171}	—	September 25, 1998	Anderson Mesa	LONEOS	·	1.5 km	MPC · JPL
85762	1998 TH_{4}	—	October 12, 1998	Kitt Peak	Spacewatch	·	1.3 km	MPC · JPL
85763	1998 TP_{7}	—	October 13, 1998	Kitt Peak	Spacewatch	·	2.2 km	MPC · JPL
85764	1998 TT_{12}	—	October 13, 1998	Kitt Peak	Spacewatch	THM	5.1 km	MPC · JPL
85765	1998 TM_{14}	—	October 14, 1998	Kitt Peak	Spacewatch	·	3.3 km	MPC · JPL
85766	1998 TQ_{15}	—	October 15, 1998	Caussols	ODAS	·	2.3 km	MPC · JPL
85767	1998 TG_{28}	—	October 15, 1998	Kitt Peak	Spacewatch	·	3.5 km	MPC · JPL
85768	1998 TV_{29}	—	October 15, 1998	Višnjan Observatory	K. Korlević	·	2.1 km	MPC · JPL
85769	1998 UB	—	October 16, 1998	Catalina	CSS	PHO	2.9 km	MPC · JPL
85770	1998 UP_{1}	—	October 18, 1998	Socorro	LINEAR	ATE	250 m	MPC · JPL
85771	1998 UR_{4}	—	October 20, 1998	Caussols	ODAS	·	3.6 km	MPC · JPL
85772	1998 UN_{6}	—	October 21, 1998	Kleť	Kleť	·	1.4 km	MPC · JPL
85773 Gutbezahl	1998 UF_{15}	Gutbezahl	October 25, 1998	Cocoa	I. P. Griffin	V	2.0 km	MPC · JPL
85774	1998 UT_{18}	—	October 27, 1998	Catalina	CSS	APO · PHA	940 m	MPC · JPL
85775	1998 UY_{20}	—	October 29, 1998	Višnjan Observatory	K. Korlević	MAS	1.6 km	MPC · JPL
85776	1998 UM_{37}	—	October 28, 1998	Socorro	LINEAR	MAS	1.6 km	MPC · JPL
85777	1998 UM_{41}	—	October 28, 1998	Socorro	LINEAR	·	1.7 km	MPC · JPL
85778	1998 UZ_{42}	—	October 28, 1998	Socorro	LINEAR	NYS	1.9 km	MPC · JPL
85779	1998 UO_{43}	—	October 28, 1998	Socorro	LINEAR	V	1.3 km	MPC · JPL
85780	1998 VK_{2}	—	November 10, 1998	Caussols	ODAS	·	4.9 km	MPC · JPL
85781	1998 VP_{2}	—	November 10, 1998	Caussols	ODAS	·	3.8 km	MPC · JPL
85782	1998 VZ_{2}	—	November 10, 1998	Caussols	ODAS	EOS	4.2 km	MPC · JPL
85783	1998 VT_{3}	—	November 10, 1998	Caussols	ODAS	NYS	2.6 km	MPC · JPL
85784	1998 VV_{3}	—	November 10, 1998	Caussols	ODAS	·	5.3 km	MPC · JPL
85785	1998 VV_{11}	—	November 10, 1998	Socorro	LINEAR	·	3.9 km	MPC · JPL
85786	1998 VY_{12}	—	November 10, 1998	Socorro	LINEAR	EUN	2.9 km	MPC · JPL
85787	1998 VU_{14}	—	November 10, 1998	Socorro	LINEAR	·	2.5 km	MPC · JPL
85788	1998 VA_{17}	—	November 10, 1998	Socorro	LINEAR	·	2.4 km	MPC · JPL
85789	1998 VK_{17}	—	November 10, 1998	Socorro	LINEAR	NYS	2.5 km	MPC · JPL
85790	1998 VX_{17}	—	November 10, 1998	Socorro	LINEAR	NYS	3.1 km	MPC · JPL
85791	1998 VS_{18}	—	November 10, 1998	Socorro	LINEAR	MRX	2.4 km	MPC · JPL
85792	1998 VK_{20}	—	November 10, 1998	Socorro	LINEAR	·	4.8 km	MPC · JPL
85793	1998 VG_{26}	—	November 10, 1998	Socorro	LINEAR	·	3.1 km	MPC · JPL
85794	1998 VA_{34}	—	November 11, 1998	Caussols	ODAS	(5)	2.4 km	MPC · JPL
85795	1998 VO_{37}	—	November 10, 1998	Socorro	LINEAR	·	2.7 km	MPC · JPL
85796	1998 VD_{43}	—	November 15, 1998	Kitt Peak	Spacewatch	·	4.5 km	MPC · JPL
85797	1998 VD_{49}	—	November 10, 1998	Socorro	LINEAR	NYS	2.5 km	MPC · JPL
85798	1998 VA_{50}	—	November 11, 1998	Socorro	LINEAR	L4	20 km	MPC · JPL
85799	1998 VV_{50}	—	November 11, 1998	Socorro	LINEAR	·	1.9 km	MPC · JPL
85800	1998 VE_{53}	—	November 14, 1998	Socorro	LINEAR	EUN	3.6 km	MPC · JPL

== 85801–85900 ==
back to top

Designation			Discovery			Properties		Ref
Permanent	Provisional	Named after	Date	Site	Discoverer(s)	Category	Diam.	Ref
85801	1998 VL_{54}	—	November 14, 1998	Socorro	LINEAR	·	2.4 km	MPC · JPL
85802	1998 VK_{55}	—	November 10, 1998	Caussols	ODAS	·	2.4 km	MPC · JPL
85803	1998 WS_{4}	—	November 18, 1998	Catalina	CSS	·	5.2 km	MPC · JPL
85804	1998 WQ_{5}	—	November 19, 1998	Socorro	LINEAR	AMO +1km	2.3 km	MPC · JPL
85805	1998 WS_{6}	—	November 24, 1998	Baton Rouge	W. R. Cooney Jr., P. M. Motl	·	3.9 km	MPC · JPL
85806	1998 WG_{8}	—	November 25, 1998	Oizumi	T. Kobayashi	·	3.0 km	MPC · JPL
85807	1998 WR_{10}	—	November 21, 1998	Socorro	LINEAR	L4	22 km	MPC · JPL
85808	1998 WF_{12}	—	November 21, 1998	Socorro	LINEAR	V	1.7 km	MPC · JPL
85809	1998 WU_{12}	—	November 21, 1998	Socorro	LINEAR	·	5.9 km	MPC · JPL
85810	1998 WV_{14}	—	November 21, 1998	Socorro	LINEAR	·	1.7 km	MPC · JPL
85811	1998 WD_{17}	—	November 21, 1998	Socorro	LINEAR	·	2.7 km	MPC · JPL
85812	1998 WR_{22}	—	November 18, 1998	Socorro	LINEAR	·	3.7 km	MPC · JPL
85813	1998 WY_{26}	—	November 16, 1998	Kitt Peak	Spacewatch	·	2.1 km	MPC · JPL
85814	1998 WF_{31}	—	November 19, 1998	Catalina	CSS	PHO	3.0 km	MPC · JPL
85815	1998 WX_{41}	—	November 24, 1998	Socorro	LINEAR	MAS	1.6 km	MPC · JPL
85816	1998 XG	—	December 8, 1998	Kleť	Kleť	·	1.8 km	MPC · JPL
85817	1998 XB_{1}	—	December 7, 1998	Caussols	ODAS	MAS	1.5 km	MPC · JPL
85818	1998 XM_{4}	—	December 10, 1998	Socorro	LINEAR	APO +1km	2.0 km	MPC · JPL
85819 Massimoamato	1998 XF_{9}	Massimoamato	December 12, 1998	San Marcello	M. Tombelli, A. Boattini	·	1.5 km	MPC · JPL
85820	1998 XP_{9}	—	December 14, 1998	Višnjan Observatory	K. Korlević	EOS	3.4 km	MPC · JPL
85821	1998 XQ_{10}	—	December 15, 1998	Caussols	ODAS	·	4.1 km	MPC · JPL
85822	1998 XC_{17}	—	December 8, 1998	Caussols	ODAS	L4	12 km	MPC · JPL
85823	1998 XM_{19}	—	December 10, 1998	Kitt Peak	Spacewatch	·	5.5 km	MPC · JPL
85824	1998 XV_{20}	—	December 10, 1998	Kitt Peak	Spacewatch	·	2.3 km	MPC · JPL
85825	1998 XL_{24}	—	December 11, 1998	Kitt Peak	Spacewatch	V	1.8 km	MPC · JPL
85826	1998 XA_{40}	—	December 14, 1998	Socorro	LINEAR	·	4.7 km	MPC · JPL
85827	1998 XA_{47}	—	December 14, 1998	Socorro	LINEAR	·	2.6 km	MPC · JPL
85828	1998 XN_{53}	—	December 14, 1998	Socorro	LINEAR	BAP	3.3 km	MPC · JPL
85829	1998 XW_{56}	—	December 15, 1998	Socorro	LINEAR	MAS	1.8 km	MPC · JPL
85830	1998 XB_{59}	—	December 15, 1998	Socorro	LINEAR	·	4.5 km	MPC · JPL
85831	1998 XL_{64}	—	December 14, 1998	Socorro	LINEAR	(5)	3.0 km	MPC · JPL
85832	1998 XR_{64}	—	December 14, 1998	Socorro	LINEAR	NYS	3.3 km	MPC · JPL
85833	1998 XD_{68}	—	December 14, 1998	Socorro	LINEAR	·	5.1 km	MPC · JPL
85834	1998 XM_{74}	—	December 14, 1998	Socorro	LINEAR	NYS	3.0 km	MPC · JPL
85835	1998 XB_{81}	—	December 15, 1998	Socorro	LINEAR	·	1.5 km	MPC · JPL
85836	1998 YF_{2}	—	December 17, 1998	Caussols	ODAS	MAS	2.4 km	MPC · JPL
85837	1998 YM_{2}	—	December 17, 1998	Caussols	ODAS	fast	2.4 km	MPC · JPL
85838	1998 YU_{2}	—	December 17, 1998	Caussols	ODAS	V	1.9 km	MPC · JPL
85839	1998 YO_{4}	—	December 17, 1998	Socorro	LINEAR	AMO +1km	1.1 km	MPC · JPL
85840	1998 YR_{4}	—	December 18, 1998	Kleť	Kleť	EOS	5.1 km	MPC · JPL
85841	1998 YR_{6}	—	December 20, 1998	Ondřejov	Kolar, A., L. Kotková	·	2.2 km	MPC · JPL
85842	1998 YK_{7}	—	December 22, 1998	Oizumi	T. Kobayashi	(5)	3.5 km	MPC · JPL
85843	1998 YT_{9}	—	December 25, 1998	Višnjan Observatory	K. Korlević, M. Jurić	·	2.2 km	MPC · JPL
85844	1998 YN_{16}	—	December 22, 1998	Kitt Peak	Spacewatch	·	5.4 km	MPC · JPL
85845	1998 YP_{16}	—	December 22, 1998	Kitt Peak	Spacewatch	·	2.3 km	MPC · JPL
85846	1998 YP_{20}	—	December 25, 1998	Kitt Peak	Spacewatch	V	1.4 km	MPC · JPL
85847	1998 YA_{28}	—	December 19, 1998	Socorro	LINEAR	EUN	2.6 km	MPC · JPL
85848	1998 YP_{29}	—	December 28, 1998	Kitt Peak	Spacewatch	·	1 km	MPC · JPL
85849	1999 AW	—	January 7, 1999	Oizumi	T. Kobayashi	·	3.7 km	MPC · JPL
85850	1999 AR_{2}	—	January 9, 1999	Oizumi	T. Kobayashi	·	2.7 km	MPC · JPL
85851	1999 AS_{4}	—	January 11, 1999	Oizumi	T. Kobayashi	PHO	6.8 km	MPC · JPL
85852	1999 AA_{5}	—	January 11, 1999	Oizumi	T. Kobayashi	·	5.2 km	MPC · JPL
85853	1999 AB_{12}	—	January 7, 1999	Kitt Peak	Spacewatch	·	4.0 km	MPC · JPL
85854	1999 AE_{13}	—	January 7, 1999	Kitt Peak	Spacewatch	·	2.6 km	MPC · JPL
85855	1999 AN_{15}	—	January 9, 1999	Kitt Peak	Spacewatch	·	2.0 km	MPC · JPL
85856	1999 AT_{19}	—	January 13, 1999	Kitt Peak	Spacewatch	(2076)	3.2 km	MPC · JPL
85857	1999 AK_{24}	—	January 15, 1999	Fair Oaks Ranch	J. V. McClusky	·	3.7 km	MPC · JPL
85858	1999 AJ_{26}	—	January 9, 1999	Uenohara	N. Kawasato	·	3.2 km	MPC · JPL
85859	1999 AY_{27}	—	January 11, 1999	Kitt Peak	Spacewatch	·	1.0 km	MPC · JPL
85860	1999 AY_{28}	—	January 13, 1999	Kitt Peak	Spacewatch	·	2.1 km	MPC · JPL
85861	1999 AJ_{33}	—	January 15, 1999	Kitt Peak	Spacewatch	V	2.0 km	MPC · JPL
85862	1999 AF_{34}	—	January 13, 1999	Anderson Mesa	LONEOS	·	3.1 km	MPC · JPL
85863	1999 BG	—	January 16, 1999	Oizumi	T. Kobayashi	·	3.7 km	MPC · JPL
85864	1999 BJ_{7}	—	January 21, 1999	Kleť	Kleť	MAS	1.6 km	MPC · JPL
85865	1999 BW_{8}	—	January 22, 1999	Višnjan Observatory	K. Korlević	·	3.2 km	MPC · JPL
85866	1999 BV_{9}	—	January 22, 1999	Višnjan Observatory	K. Korlević	·	3.5 km	MPC · JPL
85867	1999 BY_{9}	—	January 23, 1999	Višnjan Observatory	K. Korlević	AMO · slow?	770 m	MPC · JPL
85868	1999 BZ_{9}	—	January 23, 1999	Višnjan Observatory	K. Korlević	·	2.6 km	MPC · JPL
85869	1999 BK_{10}	—	January 23, 1999	Višnjan Observatory	K. Korlević	V	2.0 km	MPC · JPL
85870	1999 BF_{18}	—	January 16, 1999	Socorro	LINEAR	·	4.9 km	MPC · JPL
85871	1999 BN_{30}	—	January 19, 1999	Kitt Peak	Spacewatch	·	3.4 km	MPC · JPL
85872	1999 BH_{31}	—	January 19, 1999	Kitt Peak	Spacewatch	·	3.1 km	MPC · JPL
85873	1999 CE_{1}	—	February 5, 1999	Gekko	T. Kagawa	slow	1.9 km	MPC · JPL
85874	1999 CJ_{4}	—	February 9, 1999	Oizumi	T. Kobayashi	·	2.3 km	MPC · JPL
85875	1999 CR_{5}	—	February 12, 1999	Oizumi	T. Kobayashi	·	3.6 km	MPC · JPL
85876	1999 CQ_{7}	—	February 10, 1999	Socorro	LINEAR	PHO	3.9 km	MPC · JPL
85877	1999 CD_{8}	—	February 13, 1999	Farpoint	G. Hug, G. Bell	·	2.4 km	MPC · JPL
85878 Guzik	1999 CF_{8}	Guzik	February 13, 1999	Baton Rouge	W. R. Cooney Jr., Kandler, E.	·	2.2 km	MPC · JPL
85879	1999 CO_{10}	—	February 12, 1999	Socorro	LINEAR	PHO	2.7 km	MPC · JPL
85880	1999 CL_{14}	—	February 15, 1999	Višnjan Observatory	K. Korlević	·	3.4 km	MPC · JPL
85881	1999 CC_{19}	—	February 10, 1999	Socorro	LINEAR	PHO	6.0 km	MPC · JPL
85882	1999 CA_{25}	—	February 10, 1999	Socorro	LINEAR	PHO · slow	2.2 km	MPC · JPL
85883	1999 CS_{27}	—	February 10, 1999	Socorro	LINEAR	·	4.0 km	MPC · JPL
85884	1999 CO_{28}	—	February 10, 1999	Socorro	LINEAR	·	3.0 km	MPC · JPL
85885	1999 CS_{30}	—	February 10, 1999	Socorro	LINEAR	·	3.8 km	MPC · JPL
85886	1999 CN_{35}	—	February 10, 1999	Socorro	LINEAR	·	3.6 km	MPC · JPL
85887	1999 CE_{36}	—	February 10, 1999	Socorro	LINEAR	·	4.9 km	MPC · JPL
85888	1999 CG_{40}	—	February 10, 1999	Socorro	LINEAR	EUN	3.5 km	MPC · JPL
85889	1999 CH_{40}	—	February 10, 1999	Socorro	LINEAR	EUN	3.8 km	MPC · JPL
85890	1999 CA_{45}	—	February 10, 1999	Socorro	LINEAR	·	2.4 km	MPC · JPL
85891	1999 CH_{45}	—	February 10, 1999	Socorro	LINEAR	ADE	6.2 km	MPC · JPL
85892	1999 CH_{47}	—	February 10, 1999	Socorro	LINEAR	·	6.6 km	MPC · JPL
85893	1999 CE_{48}	—	February 10, 1999	Socorro	LINEAR	·	2.6 km	MPC · JPL
85894	1999 CH_{48}	—	February 10, 1999	Socorro	LINEAR	·	4.6 km	MPC · JPL
85895	1999 CS_{48}	—	February 10, 1999	Socorro	LINEAR	·	3.8 km	MPC · JPL
85896	1999 CJ_{49}	—	February 10, 1999	Socorro	LINEAR	·	4.4 km	MPC · JPL
85897	1999 CA_{50}	—	February 10, 1999	Socorro	LINEAR	·	2.3 km	MPC · JPL
85898	1999 CS_{51}	—	February 10, 1999	Socorro	LINEAR	V	2.2 km	MPC · JPL
85899	1999 CS_{53}	—	February 10, 1999	Socorro	LINEAR	NYS	1.9 km	MPC · JPL
85900	1999 CQ_{57}	—	February 10, 1999	Socorro	LINEAR	NYS	2.2 km	MPC · JPL

== 85901–86000 ==
back to top

Designation			Discovery			Properties		Ref
Permanent	Provisional	Named after	Date	Site	Discoverer(s)	Category	Diam.	Ref
85901	1999 CM_{66}	—	February 12, 1999	Socorro	LINEAR	·	3.7 km	MPC · JPL
85902	1999 CS_{66}	—	February 12, 1999	Socorro	LINEAR	V	3.1 km	MPC · JPL
85903	1999 CD_{70}	—	February 12, 1999	Socorro	LINEAR	·	6.2 km	MPC · JPL
85904	1999 CH_{70}	—	February 12, 1999	Socorro	LINEAR	·	3.9 km	MPC · JPL
85905	1999 CY_{73}	—	February 12, 1999	Socorro	LINEAR	·	2.7 km	MPC · JPL
85906	1999 CT_{74}	—	February 12, 1999	Socorro	LINEAR	V	1.9 km	MPC · JPL
85907	1999 CV_{83}	—	February 10, 1999	Socorro	LINEAR	NYS	2.6 km	MPC · JPL
85908	1999 CE_{85}	—	February 10, 1999	Socorro	LINEAR	·	2.1 km	MPC · JPL
85909	1999 CJ_{85}	—	February 10, 1999	Socorro	LINEAR	·	2.0 km	MPC · JPL
85910	1999 CZ_{86}	—	February 10, 1999	Socorro	LINEAR	·	3.3 km	MPC · JPL
85911	1999 CY_{91}	—	February 10, 1999	Socorro	LINEAR	·	4.1 km	MPC · JPL
85912	1999 CL_{93}	—	February 10, 1999	Socorro	LINEAR	·	3.3 km	MPC · JPL
85913	1999 CQ_{94}	—	February 10, 1999	Socorro	LINEAR	·	3.3 km	MPC · JPL
85914	1999 CM_{95}	—	February 10, 1999	Socorro	LINEAR	·	4.0 km	MPC · JPL
85915	1999 CU_{97}	—	February 10, 1999	Socorro	LINEAR	KRM · slow	6.8 km	MPC · JPL
85916	1999 CT_{98}	—	February 10, 1999	Socorro	LINEAR	(5)	4.9 km	MPC · JPL
85917	1999 CV_{98}	—	February 10, 1999	Socorro	LINEAR	·	3.3 km	MPC · JPL
85918	1999 CD_{100}	—	February 10, 1999	Socorro	LINEAR	·	3.5 km	MPC · JPL
85919	1999 CH_{100}	—	February 10, 1999	Socorro	LINEAR	·	2.6 km	MPC · JPL
85920	1999 CJ_{100}	—	February 10, 1999	Socorro	LINEAR	EUN	3.0 km	MPC · JPL
85921	1999 CV_{101}	—	February 10, 1999	Socorro	LINEAR	·	2.9 km	MPC · JPL
85922	1999 CB_{103}	—	February 12, 1999	Socorro	LINEAR	V	2.3 km	MPC · JPL
85923	1999 CF_{105}	—	February 12, 1999	Socorro	LINEAR	MAR ·	3.4 km	MPC · JPL
85924	1999 CM_{107}	—	February 12, 1999	Socorro	LINEAR	EUN	3.0 km	MPC · JPL
85925	1999 CV_{109}	—	February 12, 1999	Socorro	LINEAR	·	3.2 km	MPC · JPL
85926	1999 CV_{115}	—	February 12, 1999	Socorro	LINEAR	·	4.1 km	MPC · JPL
85927	1999 CQ_{117}	—	February 12, 1999	Socorro	LINEAR	·	6.0 km	MPC · JPL
85928	1999 CB_{120}	—	February 11, 1999	Socorro	LINEAR	EUN	2.8 km	MPC · JPL
85929	1999 CJ_{122}	—	February 11, 1999	Socorro	LINEAR	slow	4.1 km	MPC · JPL
85930	1999 CL_{122}	—	February 11, 1999	Socorro	LINEAR	EUN	3.2 km	MPC · JPL
85931	1999 CK_{123}	—	February 11, 1999	Socorro	LINEAR	·	9.2 km	MPC · JPL
85932	1999 CS_{141}	—	February 10, 1999	Kitt Peak	Spacewatch	·	2.6 km	MPC · JPL
85933	1999 CO_{146}	—	February 9, 1999	Kitt Peak	Spacewatch	NYS	2.1 km	MPC · JPL
85934	1999 CF_{148}	—	February 10, 1999	Kitt Peak	Spacewatch	(5)	1.9 km	MPC · JPL
85935	1999 CG_{149}	—	February 13, 1999	Kitt Peak	Spacewatch	·	1.9 km	MPC · JPL
85936	1999 CH_{149}	—	February 13, 1999	Kitt Peak	Spacewatch	·	2.8 km	MPC · JPL
85937	1999 DL_{1}	—	February 17, 1999	Socorro	LINEAR	PHO	3.6 km	MPC · JPL
85938	1999 DJ_{4}	—	February 24, 1999	Socorro	LINEAR	APO · PHA · moon	640 m	MPC · JPL
85939	1999 DN_{5}	—	February 17, 1999	Socorro	LINEAR	EUN	3.6 km	MPC · JPL
85940	1999 DS_{8}	—	February 18, 1999	Anderson Mesa	LONEOS	·	5.0 km	MPC · JPL
85941	1999 DC_{9}	—	February 18, 1999	Haleakala	NEAT	·	5.1 km	MPC · JPL
85942	1999 EB_{6}	—	March 12, 1999	Kitt Peak	Spacewatch	·	4.1 km	MPC · JPL
85943	1999 EJ_{7}	—	March 12, 1999	Kitt Peak	Spacewatch	·	2.5 km	MPC · JPL
85944	1999 EM_{7}	—	March 12, 1999	Kitt Peak	Spacewatch	·	2.5 km	MPC · JPL
85945	1999 EB_{8}	—	March 12, 1999	Kitt Peak	Spacewatch	·	3.0 km	MPC · JPL
85946	1999 EJ_{8}	—	March 14, 1999	Kitt Peak	Spacewatch	·	2.7 km	MPC · JPL
85947	1999 ET_{11}	—	March 12, 1999	Socorro	LINEAR	·	7.6 km	MPC · JPL
85948	1999 EP_{13}	—	March 10, 1999	Kitt Peak	Spacewatch	·	3.3 km	MPC · JPL
85949	1999 EX_{14}	—	March 10, 1999	Prescott	P. G. Comba	·	3.2 km	MPC · JPL
85950	1999 FQ_{7}	—	March 20, 1999	Socorro	LINEAR	PHO	7.9 km	MPC · JPL
85951	1999 FX_{9}	—	March 22, 1999	Anderson Mesa	LONEOS	·	4.3 km	MPC · JPL
85952	1999 FW_{12}	—	March 18, 1999	Kitt Peak	Spacewatch	·	2.6 km	MPC · JPL
85953	1999 FK_{21}	—	March 24, 1999	Socorro	LINEAR	ATE +1km	590 m	MPC · JPL
85954	1999 FY_{23}	—	March 19, 1999	Socorro	LINEAR	·	2.9 km	MPC · JPL
85955	1999 FB_{29}	—	March 19, 1999	Socorro	LINEAR	·	7.0 km	MPC · JPL
85956	1999 FT_{35}	—	March 20, 1999	Socorro	LINEAR	·	2.0 km	MPC · JPL
85957	1999 FZ_{38}	—	March 20, 1999	Socorro	LINEAR	·	2.2 km	MPC · JPL
85958	1999 FU_{42}	—	March 20, 1999	Socorro	LINEAR	·	2.7 km	MPC · JPL
85959	1999 FV_{42}	—	March 20, 1999	Socorro	LINEAR	V	1.9 km	MPC · JPL
85960	1999 FR_{50}	—	March 20, 1999	Socorro	LINEAR	·	4.7 km	MPC · JPL
85961	1999 FV_{51}	—	March 20, 1999	Socorro	LINEAR	·	2.1 km	MPC · JPL
85962	1999 FJ_{53}	—	March 20, 1999	Socorro	LINEAR	·	2.1 km	MPC · JPL
85963	1999 FD_{57}	—	March 20, 1999	Socorro	LINEAR	EUN	2.7 km	MPC · JPL
85964	1999 FZ_{57}	—	March 20, 1999	Socorro	LINEAR	·	3.8 km	MPC · JPL
85965	1999 FW_{60}	—	March 22, 1999	Anderson Mesa	LONEOS	·	5.1 km	MPC · JPL
85966	1999 FD_{62}	—	March 22, 1999	Anderson Mesa	LONEOS	·	3.7 km	MPC · JPL
85967	1999 GK_{1}	—	April 7, 1999	Oizumi	T. Kobayashi	MAR	3.4 km	MPC · JPL
85968	1999 GB_{2}	—	April 8, 1999	Gekko	T. Kagawa	·	3.4 km	MPC · JPL
85969	1999 GP_{2}	—	April 8, 1999	Bergisch Gladbach	W. Bickel	HYG	5.5 km	MPC · JPL
85970 Fundaçãoterra	1999 GB_{4}	Fundaçãoterra	April 11, 1999	Wykrota	C. Jacques	·	4.4 km	MPC · JPL
85971	1999 GW_{5}	—	April 15, 1999	Woomera	F. B. Zoltowski	·	6.3 km	MPC · JPL
85972	1999 GJ_{7}	—	April 6, 1999	Anderson Mesa	LONEOS	·	5.9 km	MPC · JPL
85973	1999 GP_{19}	—	April 15, 1999	Socorro	LINEAR	EUN	4.2 km	MPC · JPL
85974	1999 GF_{21}	—	April 15, 1999	Socorro	LINEAR	·	3.5 km	MPC · JPL
85975	1999 GD_{33}	—	April 12, 1999	Socorro	LINEAR	·	2.7 km	MPC · JPL
85976	1999 GR_{33}	—	April 12, 1999	Socorro	LINEAR	EUN	2.7 km	MPC · JPL
85977	1999 GZ_{42}	—	April 12, 1999	Socorro	LINEAR	·	5.1 km	MPC · JPL
85978	1999 GD_{45}	—	April 12, 1999	Socorro	LINEAR	·	5.2 km	MPC · JPL
85979	1999 GH_{59}	—	April 12, 1999	Socorro	LINEAR	·	3.7 km	MPC · JPL
85980	1999 HG_{3}	—	April 20, 1999	Oohira	T. Urata	RAF	2.5 km	MPC · JPL
85981	1999 HS_{3}	—	April 18, 1999	Catalina	CSS	·	2.9 km	MPC · JPL
85982	1999 HQ_{6}	—	April 19, 1999	Kitt Peak	Spacewatch	·	5.5 km	MPC · JPL
85983	1999 HX_{7}	—	April 19, 1999	Kitt Peak	Spacewatch	·	3.6 km	MPC · JPL
85984	1999 HV_{10}	—	April 17, 1999	Socorro	LINEAR	·	3.2 km	MPC · JPL
85985	1999 JW	—	May 5, 1999	Xinglong	SCAP	·	6.0 km	MPC · JPL
85986	1999 JX	—	May 6, 1999	Xinglong	SCAP	·	4.5 km	MPC · JPL
85987	1999 JT_{5}	—	May 12, 1999	Socorro	LINEAR	H	1.7 km	MPC · JPL
85988	1999 JX_{5}	—	May 12, 1999	Socorro	LINEAR	·	5.8 km	MPC · JPL
85989	1999 JD_{6}	—	May 12, 1999	Anderson Mesa	LONEOS	ATE +1km · PHA	1.5 km	MPC · JPL
85990	1999 JV_{6}	—	May 13, 1999	Socorro	LINEAR	APO · PHA	450 m	MPC · JPL
85991	1999 JJ_{16}	—	May 15, 1999	Kitt Peak	Spacewatch	·	4.5 km	MPC · JPL
85992	1999 JR_{17}	—	May 10, 1999	Socorro	LINEAR	·	6.4 km	MPC · JPL
85993	1999 JU_{28}	—	May 10, 1999	Socorro	LINEAR	AEO	2.5 km	MPC · JPL
85994	1999 JV_{41}	—	May 10, 1999	Socorro	LINEAR	·	4.0 km	MPC · JPL
85995	1999 JT_{56}	—	May 10, 1999	Socorro	LINEAR	·	4.5 km	MPC · JPL
85996	1999 JO_{65}	—	May 12, 1999	Socorro	LINEAR	MAR	2.5 km	MPC · JPL
85997	1999 JB_{69}	—	May 12, 1999	Socorro	LINEAR	·	3.4 km	MPC · JPL
85998	1999 JH_{69}	—	May 12, 1999	Socorro	LINEAR	·	3.7 km	MPC · JPL
85999	1999 JY_{72}	—	May 12, 1999	Socorro	LINEAR	·	3.7 km	MPC · JPL
86000	1999 JT_{78}	—	May 13, 1999	Socorro	LINEAR	MAR	2.3 km	MPC · JPL

back to top

== See also ==
- Meanings of minor-planet names: 85001–86000
