= Meanings of minor-planet names: 85001–86000 =

As minor planet discoveries are confirmed, they are given a permanent number by the IAU's Minor Planet Center (MPC), and the discoverers can then submit names for them, following the IAU's naming conventions. The list below concerns those minor planets in the specified number-range that have received names, and explains the meanings of those names.

Official naming citations of newly named small Solar System bodies are approved and published in a bulletin by IAU's Working Group for Small Bodies Nomenclature (WGSBN). Before May 2021, citations were published in MPC's Minor Planet Circulars for many decades. Recent citations can also be found on the JPL Small-Body Database (SBDB). Until his death in 2016, German astronomer Lutz D. Schmadel compiled these citations into the Dictionary of Minor Planet Names (DMP) and regularly updated the collection.

Based on Paul Herget's The Names of the Minor Planets, Schmadel also researched the unclear origin of numerous asteroids, most of which had been named prior to World War II. This article incorporates text from this source, which is in the public domain: SBDB New namings may only be added to this list below after official publication as the preannouncement of names is condemned. The WGSBN publishes a comprehensive guideline for the naming rules of non-cometary small Solar System bodies.

== 85001–85100 ==
| Named minor planet | Provisional | This minor planet was named for... | Ref · Catalog |
|---|---|---|---|
| 85004 Crombie | 2003 YY_{152} | M. Katherine Crombie (born 1970), a member of the OSIRIS-REx science team with responsibility for data management and archiving. | JPL · 85004 |
| 85014 Sutter | 2004 BD_{38} | Brian Sutter (born 1961), an engineer at Lockheed Martin Company and the Mission Designer for the OSIRIS-REx Asteroid Sample Return Mission. | JPL · 85014 |
| 85015 Gaskell | 2004 BE_{38} | Robert Gaskell (born 1945), a Senior Scientist at the Planetary Science Institute | JPL · 85015 |
| 85030 Admetos | 2804 P-L | Admetus (Admetos), from Greek mythology. The King of Pherae was saved by Apollo from his fated death when his wife Alcestis offers to die in his place, father of Eumelos, the best charioteer in the Greek army during the Trojan war | JPL · 85030 |
| 85047 Krakatau | 6255 P-L | The island of Krakatau, Indonesia. It partly collapsed beneath the sea in 1883 during one of the largest volcanic eruptions in historic times. | JPL · 85047 |
| 85095 Hekla | 5192 T-2 | Hekla, a prominent volcano in the south of Iceland | JPL · 85095 |

== 85101–85200 ==
back to top

| Named minor planet | Provisional | This minor planet was named for... | Ref · Catalog |
|---|---|---|---|
| 85119 Hannieschaft | 1972 RD | Hannie Schaft (1920–1945) was a member of the Dutch Resistance during World War II. Her nickname was "Het meisje met het rode haar" (the girl with the red hair), which is also the title of a book and film about her. Born as Jannetje Johanna Schaft, her secret name in the resistance movement was "Hannie". She was executed three weeks before the end of the war. | JPL · 85119 |
| 85121 Loehde | 1976 KF_{3} | Franklin C. Loehde (born 1936) is a retired Canadian science educator in Edmonton. He was involved in successful efforts to build the Queen Elizabeth Planetarium in 1960 and the Edmonton Space Sciences Centre (now the Odyssium) in 1984. He served as National President of the Royal Astronomical Society of Canada during 1982–1984 (Src). | JPL · 85121 |
| 85158 Phyllistrapp | 1987 UT_{1} | Phyllis Trapp (born 1952) has been an inspiration to many with her indomitable spirit during her courageous 18-year battle with breast cancer. Devoted to her family, she volunteered in her grandsons' school, encouraging and teaching students through her love and patience, and playing the piano for kindergarten performances. | JPL · 85158 |
| 85168 Albertacentenary | 1989 RC_{6} | Centenary of the provincehood of Alberta (in 2005). Alberta was named after Princess Louise Caroline Alberta, fourth daughter of Queen Victoria (Src). | JPL · 85168 |
| 85179 Meistereckhart | 1990 TS_{11} | Meister Eckhart (ca. 1260–1327/28), a German theologian and mystic from Thuringia. His philosophy is unique, although it combines Greek, Neoplatonic, Arabic and Scholastic elements. Because part of his theological writings are in German, he influenced German language and terminology. | JPL · 85179 |
| 85183 Marcelaymé | 1991 BE_{1} | Marcel Aymé (1902–1967) was a French novelist, screenwriter and theater playwright. Educated at the College de Dole, he worked as a journalist in Paris while publishing his first novel Brûlebois (1926). His novel La Table aux crevés won the Prix Renaudot in 1929. He was buried near Montmartre. | JPL · 85183 |
| 85185 Lederman | 1991 LM_{3} | Leon M. Lederman (1922–2018) was an American particle physicist and 1988 Physics Nobel Laureate. In 1962 he discovered the muon neutrino and in 1977 the bottom quark. Since 1989 he has been director emeritus of the Fermi National Accelerator Laboratory, and is the author of The God particle. | JPL · 85185 |
| 85190 Birgitroth | 1991 RR_{3} | Birgit Roth (born 1974) is a German physician and well-known expert on hematology and oncology. | JPL · 85190 |
| 85195 von Helfta | 1991 TW_{2} | Gertrude the Great (1256–1302), a German mystic who lived in the nunnery of Helfta near Eisleben. Her popular poetic writings Legatus Divinae Pietatis and Exercitia Spiritualia represent her religious experiences and the theological view of her time. | JPL · 85195 |
| 85196 Halle | 1991 TG_{3} | The German city of Halle in Saxony Anhalt, where the University of Halle-Wittenberg, the academy of Art and Design, and the Franckesche foundation is located. It is also the birthplace of George Frideric Handel. | JPL · 85196 |
| 85197 Ginkgo | 1991 TG_{5} | The tree Ginkgo biloba | JPL · 85197 |
| 85198 Weltenburg | 1991 TC_{6} | The famous Benedictine Abbey in Weltenburg on the Danube is the oldest monastery in Bavaria. It was founded around 600 CE and the monks have brewed beer there since 1050. It is the world's oldest monastic brewery. | JPL · 85198 |
| 85199 Habsburg | 1991 TE_{7} | Habsburg Castle or Habichtsburg (lit. "hawk's castle"), is a ruin in the Swiss canton of Aargau. It is the ancestral seat of the European Habsburg dynasty, which reigned for 1000 years. Its power culminated with emperor Karl V (1500–1558). The name was suggested by Freimut Börngen who co-discovered this asteroid. | JPL · 85199 |
| 85200 Johnhault | 1991 TG_{15} | John A. Hault (born 1946) a Canadian public science educator. He was curator of Edmonton's Queen Elizabeth Planetarium when, in the mid-1970s, he recognized the need for a major science center. He played the major role in developing the project and served as the first director of the Edmonton Space Sciences Centre (now the Odyssium) when it opened in 1984. | JPL · 85200 |

== 85201–85300 ==
back to top

| Named minor planet | Provisional | This minor planet was named for... | Ref · Catalog |
|---|---|---|---|
| 85214 Sommersdorf | 1992 SZ_{1} | Sommersdorf is a municipality in the northern part of Bavaria, Germany | JPL · 85214 |
| 85215 Hohenzollern | 1992 SD_{14} | Burg Hohenzollern, originally Zollern, castle on the mountain cone of the same name in the Swabian Alps, Germany, ancestral seat of the Hohenzollern dynasty | JPL · 85215 |
| 85216 Schein | 1992 SL_{17} | Johann Hermann Schein (1586–1630), born and died in Saxony, was cantor of Leipzig's Thomanerchor for 16 years. He belongs to the grand three "S" of baroque music in Germany: the three composers Schütz, Schein and Scheidt, were born in 1585, 1586 and 1587, respectively. | JPL · 85216 |
| 85217 Bilzingsleben | 1992 US_{8} | Bilzingsleben, Thuringia, Germany, one of Europe's most important early palaeolithic sites | JPL · 85217 |
| 85267 Taj Mahal | 1994 AD_{2} | The Taj Mahal is a mausoleum, commissioned in 1632 by the Mughal emperor Shah Jahan to house the tomb of his favorite wife. | JPL · 85267 |
| 85293 Tengzhou | 1994 RC_{25} | The Chinese city of Tengzhou, located in the southern part of Shandong Province. | JPL · 85293 |
| 85299 Neander | 1994 TM_{16} | Joachim Neander (1650–1680), a German theologian and headmaster of a Latin school. He wrote the words to the ecumenical hymn Praise to the Lord, the Almighty. The Neander Valley, where the Neandertal was found, is also named after him. | JPL · 85299 |

== 85301–85400 ==
back to top

| Named minor planet | Provisional | This minor planet was named for... | Ref · Catalog |
|---|---|---|---|
| 85308 Atsushimori | 1994 WG_{4} | Atsushi Mori (1970–2007), a Japanese astronomer, was a researcher at the National Astronomical Observatory (2000–2003) and Nishi-Harima Astronomical Observatory (2003–2007). He devoted himself to the study of cometary physics, as well as to educating the general public about astronomy. | JPL · 85308 |
| 85317 Lehár | 1995 BB_{16} | Franz Lehár (1870–1948), an Austrian composer who created a new style of Viennese operetta. In 1905, he achieved worldwide success with The Merry Widow, The Land of Smiles, and other operettas followed. Several of his works were filmed. | JPL · 85317 |
| 85320 Bertram | 1995 EP_{8} | Master Bertram (c.1345–1415) was a German Gothic painter primarily of religious art. The youngest grandson of Freimut Börngen, who discovered this asteroid's, is also named Bertram (born 2002). | JPL · 85320 |
| 85368 Elisabettacioni | 1996 CQ_{7} | Elisabetta Cioni (born 1962) has been an amateur astronomer at the Gruppo Astrofili Montelupo since 2004. | IAU · 85368 |
| 85386 Payton | 1996 OU_{2} | Walter Payton (1953–1999) an American football player who was one of the greatest running backs ever to play in the National Football League. He is considered by many to be the best all-around football player ever. His 13-year career was with the Chicago Bears. He was inducted into the Pro Football Hall of Fame in 1993. | JPL · 85386 |
| 85388 Sakazukiyama | 1996 PU_{9} | Sakazukiyama mountain (256-m high) is located in eastern part of Yamagata city, Japan. The mountain is popular with hikers. | JPL · 85388 |
| 85389 Rosenauer | 1996 QE_{1} | Josef Rosenauer (1735–1804) was a Czech engineer who designed and built of the Schwarzenberg Canal for floating timber from the Šumava mountains to Vienna. Finished in 1793, this waterway connected the Vltava and the Danube, two rivers that flow into different seas. | JPL · 85389 |
| 85400 Shiratakachu | 1996 TD_{10} | Shirataka Chugakko is the name of a middle school in Yamagata Prefecture Shirataka town Japan. It was founded in April 2015. | JPL · 85400 |

== 85401–85500 ==
back to top

| Named minor planet | Provisional | This minor planet was named for... | Ref · Catalog |
|---|---|---|---|
| 85401 Yamatenclub | 1996 TW_{14} | The Yamagata Tenmon Club, established in 1961, consists of a group of amateur astronomers in Japan. | JPL · 85401 |
| 85410 Ningda | 1996 UJ_{4} | Ningbo University (NBU, abbreviated as Ningda). | IAU · 85410 |
| 85411 Paulflora | 1996 VA_{1} | Paul Flora (1922–2009) was an Austrian caricaturist, graphic artist and illustrator. He was born in South Tyrol, Italy, but has lived in Innsbruck, North Tyrol, Austria, since his early years. His first book, Flora's Fauna, was published in 1953. His ironic and sarcastic drawings, sketched in a distinctive, unique style, have gained international recognition. | JPL · 85411 |
| 85422 Maedanaoe | 1996 XV_{30} | Maeda Naoe (1915–2008), a Japanese-style paint artist from Mochigase in Tottori city. He was active in Kyoto painting circles, and was well known for "the Machiya series of Kyoto". | JPL · 85422 |
| 85439 Barbero | 1997 EP_{40} | Alessandro Barbero (b. 1959), an Italian historian and novelist. | IAU · 85439 |
| 85466 Krastins | 1997 JK_{15} | Janis Krastins (born 1943), a Latvian architect and a prolific and enthusiastic contemporary scholar of Riga's architecture. He has contributed more than 600 papers and several books on the subject. A graduate of Riga's Polytechnic Institute, he has lectured at Harvard University on architectural eclecticism and Art Nouveau. | JPL · 85466 |
| 85471 Maryam | 1997 LD_{4} | Martin Pepper (born 1976), Ryan Pepper (born 1977) and Amber Pepper (born 1980), are the children of one of the co-discoverers at the Needville Observatory in Texas, to which the discovery is officially credited | JPL · 85471 |
| 85472 Xizezong | 1997 LF_{4} | Xi Zezong (1927–2008), Chinese science historian and member of the Chinese Academy of Sciences. He made many contributions to the history of science, especially to the history of astronomy. His New Catalogue of Ancient Novae (1955) has received wide attention in the contemporary astrophysical community. | JPL · 85472 |

== 85501–85600 ==
back to top

| Named minor planet | Provisional | This minor planet was named for... | Ref · Catalog |
|---|---|---|---|
| 85511 Celnik | 1997 UR_{10} | Werner E. Celnik (born 1953) studied astrophysics and is a longtime German amateur astronomer. He served as president of the German Vereinigung der Sternfreunde. As an astronomy writer and lecturer he always keeps the interests of beginning amateur astronomers in mind. He is also an experienced astrophotographer | JPL · 85511 |
| 85512 Rieugnie | 1997 UW_{10} | Yvon (born 1932), Marc (born 1966) and Delphine (born 1960) Rieugnie helped many French amateur astronomers build their own telescopes and mirrors. They also contribute in the Association des Utilisateurs de Détecteurs Electroniques and the Société Astronomique de France | JPL · 85512 |
| 85515 Annakukharskaya | 1997 UT_{24} | Anna Kukharskaya, the daughter-in-law of the second discoverer. | IAU · 85515 |
| 85516 Vaclík | 1997 VF | František "Freddy" Vaclík (1942–2010) was an amateur astronomer interested in variable star visual observations and searching for moldavites. He actively took part in astronomical biking "Ebicykl" and served as the long-time chairman of the Czech Astronomical Society in Southern Bohemia | JPL · 85516 |
| 85558 Tianjinshida | 1998 AB_{3} | Founded in 1958, Tianjinshida (Tianjin Normal University) is a key comprehensive university in Tianjin, with more than 30 000 enrolled students. The university's Tianjin Astrophysics Center offers the only astronomy program among some 60 higher-education institutions in the megalopolis. | IAU · 85558 |
| 85559 Villecroze | 1998 AC_{5} | Jean-Louis Villecroze, husband of Canadian astronomer Susan Banh who discovered this minor planet | JPL · 85559 |
| 85564 Emilia | 1998 BU_{7} | Emilia Colombini (born 2020) is the first daughter of Federico Colombini and Claudia Guarnieri. | IAU · 85564 |
| 85585 Mjolnir | 1998 FG_{2} | In Norse mythology, Mjölnir is the hammer of Thor, god of thunder and defender of the world. Forged by the dwarf Eitri, the hammer had the magical power to return when thrown by Thor. | JPL · 85585 |

== 85601–85700 ==
back to top

| Named minor planet | Provisional | This minor planet was named for... | Ref · Catalog |
|---|---|---|---|
There are no named minor planets in this number range

== 85701–85800 ==
back to top

| Named minor planet | Provisional | This minor planet was named for... | Ref · Catalog |
|---|---|---|---|
| 85728 Yangfujia | 1998 SR_{75} | Yang Fujia (1936–2022), a renowned nuclear physicist, educator, an academician of the Chinese Academy of Sciences. | IAU · 85728 |
| 85773 Gutbezahl | 1998 UF_{15} | Jennifer Gutbezahl (born 1963), American psychologist deeply involved in the evaluation of the NASA Space Science Mission Directorate's education and public outreach programs. Her academic background includes explorations of the human experience from both an artistic and a scientific viewpoint. | JPL · 85773 |

== 85801–85900 ==
back to top

| Named minor planet | Provisional | This minor planet was named for... | Ref · Catalog |
|---|---|---|---|
| 85819 Massimoamato | 1998 XF_{9} | Massimo Amato, Italian amateur astronomer. | IAU · 85819 |
| 85878 Guzik | 1999 CF_{8} | T. Gregory Guzik (born 1952), a professor at Louisiana State University who researched cosmic rays while promoting student and public involvement with science for more than 30 years. A founding member of the Highland Road Park Observatory in Baton Rouge, Louisiana, he developed ballooning programs for training new scientists and engineers. | JPL · 85878 |

== 85901–86000 ==
back to top

| Named minor planet | Provisional | This minor planet was named for... | Ref · Catalog |
|---|---|---|---|
| 85970 Fundaçãoterra | 1999 GB_{4} | Fundação Terra is a non-profit and non-governmental organization, whose efforts to help the poorest people in the Northeast region of Brazil have guaranteed their wellness through donations and philanthropic gestures for more than 30 years. | JPL · 85970 |

back to top

| Preceded by 84,001–85,000 | Meanings of minor-planet names List of minor planets: 85,001–86,000 | Succeeded by 86,001–87,000 |
