= Saint-Tropez (disambiguation) =

Saint-Tropez is a place in the French Riviera.

Saint-Tropez, San Tropez and St. Tropez may also refer to:

== Music ==
- "San Tropez" (song), by Pink Floyd from the 1971 album Meddle
- "St. Tropez" by Diva Gray & Oyster from the 1979 album Hotel Paradise
- "St. Tropez" by The Rippingtons on the 1992 album Weekend in Monaco
- "Saint Tropez" by Ricky Martin on the 2000 album Sound Loaded
- "St. Tropez", a song by Dusty Trails from their 2000 album Dusty Trails
- "Сен Тропе" (Saint Tropez, 2011) by Azis
- "Saint Tropez" (2013) by Florin Salam
- "St. Tropez", a song by J. Cole on his album 2014 Forest Hills Drive
- "Saint-Tropez" (song), a song by Post Malone on the 2019 album Hollywood's Bleeding
- "St Tropez" by Skepta, Chip and Young Adz on the 2020 album Insomnia
- "Saint-Tropez", a song by Gims on the 2022 album Les dernières volontés de Mozart

== Other ==
- Asteroid (86048) Saint-Tropez
- St. Tropez (self-tan brand), a self-tanning brand
- Saint Tropez (brand), a Danish fashion brand
- Torpes of Pisa, a saint and martyr
- San Torpete, a church of Torpes of Pisa
- St. Tropez, the first condominium building in Manhattan
