= Hotel Paradise =

Hotel Paradise may refer to:

== Film and TV ==
- Hotel Paradis, 1931 Danish film
- Hotel Paradise (1937 film), a Swedish comedy film
- Hotel Paradiso (film), 1966 film
- Hotel Paradise (1980 film), (Italian: Orinoco - Prigioniere del sesso) film with Ajita Wilson
- Hotel Paradise (1995 film), 29 min film by Nicholas Roeg
- Paradise Hotel, US reality show
- Hotel Paradise, Czech version of reality show on Prima televize
- Hotel Paradise, Greek play with Giannis Bezos
- Paradise Hotel (film), a 2010 Bulgarian documentary

== Other ==
- Hotel Paradise (album), Diva Gray
- Hotel Paradise, novel by Carol Drinkwater

== See also ==
- Paradise Hotel (disambiguation)
