= Paradise Hotel (disambiguation) =

Paradise Hotel is a reality television series.

Paradise Hotel may also refer to:

- Paradise Hotel, site of the 2002 Mombasa attacks in Kenya
- Paradise Hotel (2010 film), a Bulgarian documentary
- Paradise Hotel (2019 film), a Peruvian comedy
- L'Hôtel du libre échange, an 1894 French comedy play sometimes translated as Paradise Hotel

== See also ==
- Hotel Paradise (disambiguation)
