= Diva Gray =

American disco singer (1952–2024)

- Born: September 14, 1952
- Died: November 19, 2024 (aged 72)
- Genres: R&B; house; post-disco
- Occupation: Singer
- Instrument: Vocals

Diva Gray (September 14, 1952 – November 19, 2024) was an American singer. She was best known as a backing vocalist behind the band Chic with Luther Vandross and Robin Clark, as well as in other disco groups, including Change, and Lemon with Lani Groves, Gordon Grody, Luther Vandross, David Lasley and Kenny Lehman, and in Bette Midler's female backing group, The Harlettes with Ula Hedwig and Jocelyn Brown. As a solo performer, she recorded the album Hotel Paradise, produced by Luigi Ojival and released on Columbia Records. Diva Gray & Oyster's "Saint Tropez" was a hit single on the French charts. Gray died on November 19, 2024, at the age of 72.

== Discography ==
- Hotel Paradise (Columbia Records - JC 36265)
