= Meanings of minor-planet names: 86001–87000 =

As minor planet discoveries are confirmed, they are given a permanent number by the IAU's Minor Planet Center (MPC), and the discoverers can then submit names for them, following the IAU's naming conventions. The list below concerns those minor planets in the specified number-range that have received names, and explains the meanings of those names.

Official naming citations of newly named small Solar System bodies are approved and published in a bulletin by IAU's Working Group for Small Bodies Nomenclature (WGSBN). Before May 2021, citations were published in MPC's Minor Planet Circulars for many decades. Recent citations can also be found on the JPL Small-Body Database (SBDB). Until his death in 2016, German astronomer Lutz D. Schmadel compiled these citations into the Dictionary of Minor Planet Names (DMP) and regularly updated the collection.

Based on Paul Herget's The Names of the Minor Planets, Schmadel also researched the unclear origin of numerous asteroids, most of which had been named prior to World War II. This article incorporates text from this source, which is in the public domain: SBDB New namings may only be added to this list below after official publication as the preannouncement of names is condemned. The WGSBN publishes a comprehensive guideline for the naming rules of non-cometary small Solar System bodies.

== 86001–86100 ==
Named minor planet	Provisional	This minor planet was named for...	Ref · Catalog
86029 Riccardopozzobon	1999 LV_{32}	Riccardo Pozzobon, Italian planetary scientist at University of Padova.	IAU · 86029
86043 Cévennes	1999 OE	Cévennes National Park (French: Parc national des Cévennes), southern France, where the discovering Pises Observatory is located	JPL · 86043
86048 Saint-Tropez	1999 PP_{1}	Saint-Tropez, a famous French Riviera village and a resort for jet set and tourists and the birthplace of small bodies planetologist Patrick Michel	IAU · 86048

== 86101–86200 ==
back to top

Named minor planet	Provisional	This minor planet was named for...	Ref · Catalog
86195 Cireglio	1999 ST_{9}	Cireglio, a small village where the P. Petrocchi Primary School is located.	IAU86195
86196 Specula	1999 SC_{10}	"Specula" is the old name for the Observatory of Eger (University), built in 1774 by count/bishop Károly Eszterházy, after whom the Eszterházy Károly University is named. The observatory is now a museum.	JPL · 86196

== 86201–86300 ==
back to top

Named minor planet	Provisional	This minor planet was named for...	Ref · Catalog
86279 Brucegary	1999 UJ_{1}	Bruce L. Gary (born 1939), an American astronomer and member of the Huachuca Astronomy Club, who has retired from the Jet Propulsion Laboratory, where he specialized in lunar radio astronomy. He is currently noted for his contributions to amateur-professional collaboration in photometry of variable stars, comets and minor planets and owns the Hereford Arizona Observatory (G95) (Src).	JPL · 86279

== 86301–86400 ==
back to top

Named minor planet	Provisional	This minor planet was named for...	Ref · Catalog
There are no named minor planets in this number range

== 86401–86500 ==
back to top

Named minor planet	Provisional	This minor planet was named for...	Ref · Catalog
There are no named minor planets in this number range

== 86501–86600 ==
back to top

Named minor planet	Provisional	This minor planet was named for...	Ref · Catalog
86551 Seth	2000 EE_{4}	Seth James Brady (born 1994) is the son of New Zealand astronomer Nigel Brady who discovered this minor planet.	JPL · 86551

== 86601–86700 ==
back to top

Named minor planet	Provisional	This minor planet was named for...	Ref · Catalog
There are no named minor planets in this number range

== 86701–86800 ==
back to top

Named minor planet	Provisional	This minor planet was named for...	Ref · Catalog
There are no named minor planets in this number range

== 86801–86900 ==
back to top

Named minor planet	Provisional	This minor planet was named for...	Ref · Catalog
There are no named minor planets in this number range

== 86901–87000 ==
back to top

Named minor planet	Provisional	This minor planet was named for...	Ref · Catalog
There are no named minor planets in this number range

back to top

Preceded by 85,001–86,000	Meanings of minor-planet names List of minor planets: 86,001–87,000	Succeeded by 87,001–88,000
