= Torpes of Pisa =

Early Christian martyr

Saint Torpes of Pisa

Martyr
- Born: Pisa
- Died: ~65 AD; Pisa
- Venerated in: Roman Catholic Church; Eastern Orthodox Church; Oriental Orthodox churches
- Feast: 29 April
- Attributes: palm of martyrdom; sword; boat
- Patronage: sailors; Pisa; Saint-Tropez

Torpes of Pisa (Torpetius, Tropesius; died 65 AD) is venerated as an early Christian martyr. The town of Saint-Tropez, France, is named after him. His veneration states that he was martyred during the persecutions of Nero. Some of the accounts about him are considered unreliable. Little else is known about his life. He is first mentioned in sources dating from the 9th century.

== Life ==
Evidence of his life state that he was a gladiator or knight (equites) who was an attendant to the Emperor Nero, or head of the emperor's personal bodyguard. His full name was Caïus Silvius Torpetius and he was a native of Pisa.

Torpes became a Christian after being converted by Paul the Apostle. He professed his faith during a ceremony in which Nero declared Diana to be the creator of the universe. After Torpes declared himself a Christian, Nero did not want to kill him immediately and instead asked him to renounce his faith. When Torpes refused to do so, Nero had him decapitated. Another source states that Torpes left Rome and went to Pisa, but was recognized as a Christian by the local prefect, Satellicus, who had him executed.

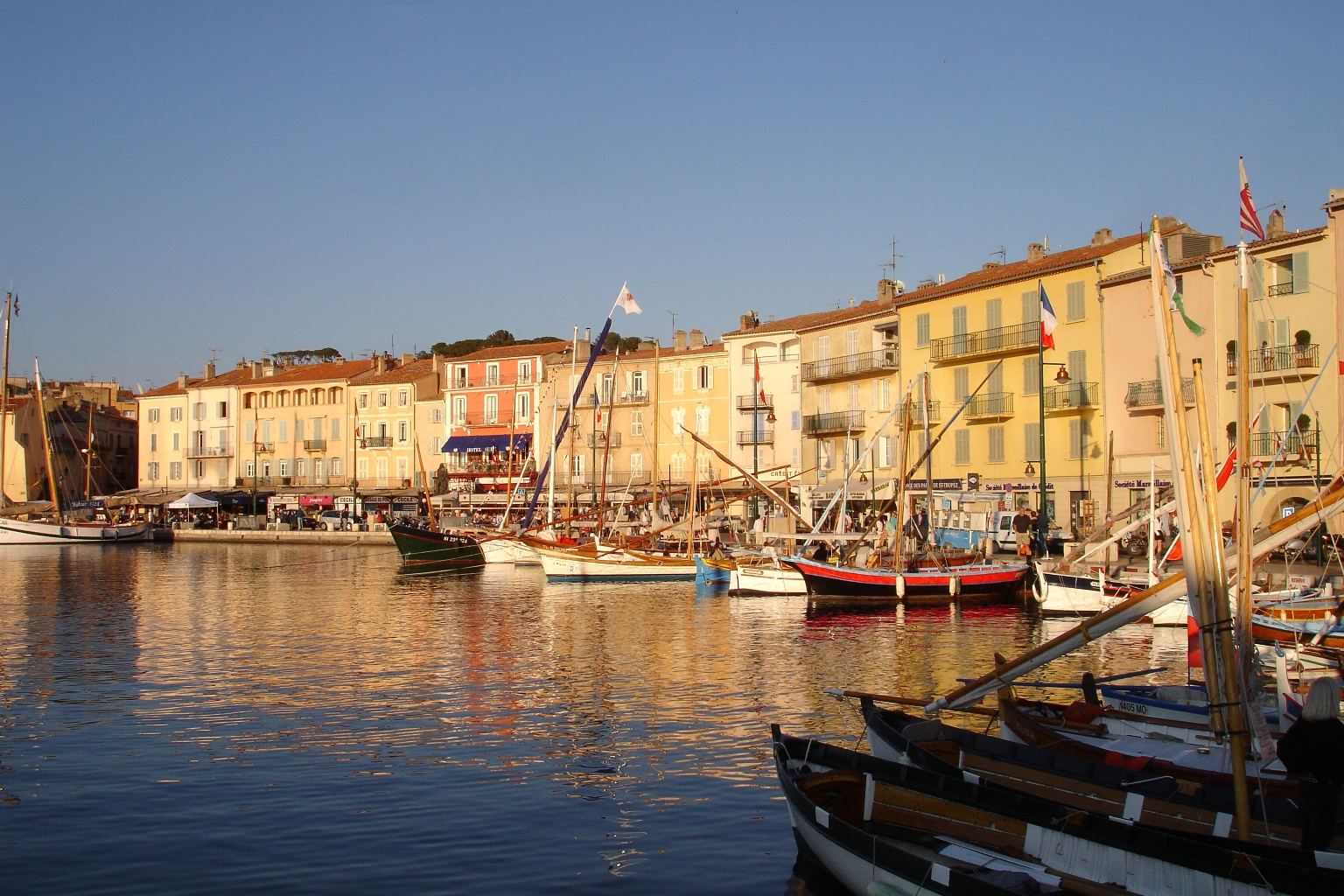
Saint-Tropez "le vieux port" (the old port)

Torpes’ head was tossed into the Arno (and was later claimed by Pisa). His body was placed in a rotten boat with a cock and a dog, which had been placed there in order to nourish themselves on the saint's body. The boat floated towards Liguria.

A holy woman named Celerina (Célèrine) had a premonition in a dream of the arrival of the saint's body, and indeed the boat reached the present-day location of Saint-Tropez, where Celerina lived. The boat landed not far from the present-day sailors' cemetery. The body was untouched by both the cock and the dog. The cock flew away towards the village later named Cogolin after it; the dog headed towards the village later named in its honor Grimaud.

The local people named their village in honor of him. The theme of the relics being transported across the sea in a small boat is a tale found in the legends of other saints of the region, such as Reparata and Devota. Places on the coasts of Spain and Portugal also declared themselves to be the locations where Torpes' boat had landed.

Torpes was venerated in Pisa, Genoa, and Portugal. He became the patron saint of sailors.

== Veneration ==
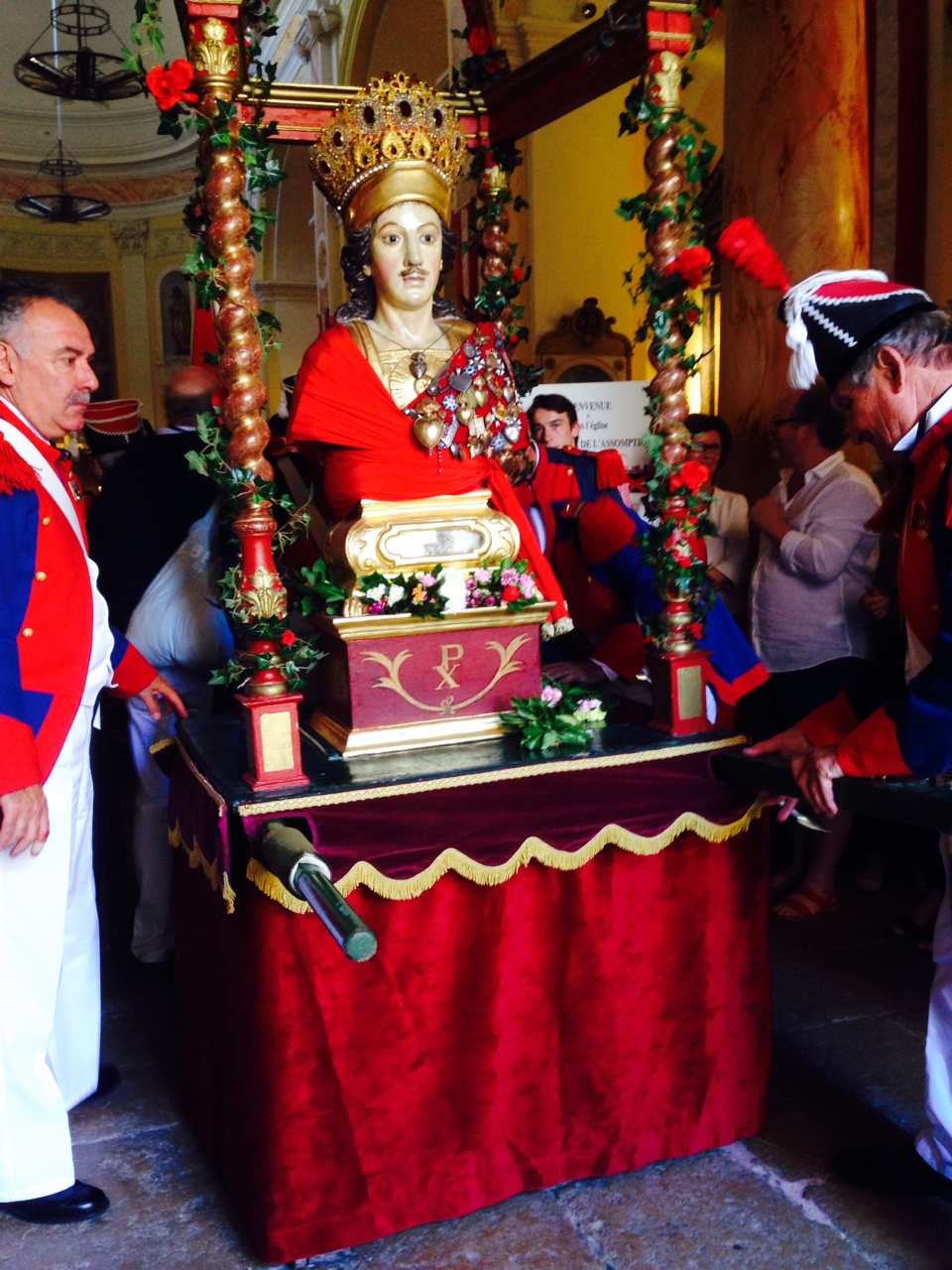
Bust of Saint Tropez during the Bravades of Saint-Tropez.

The earliest church in Pisa dedicated to him dates from the eleventh century. The civil code of the Republic of Pisa of 1284 established 29 April as the feast day of the saint. The Pisans credit Torpes with ending a terrible plague that afflicted the city in 1633.

In Genoa, where the cult of Torpes was imported by Pisan merchants, the church of San Torpete is dedicated to the saint.

In Saint-Tropez, his bust is honored during the festival of Les Bravades in mid-May and again in mid-June in the festival of Les Bravades des Espagnols, a religious and military celebration commemorating the victory of the Tropezian militia over the Spanish in 1637.
