= List of minor planets: 86001–87000 =

The following is a partial list of minor planets, running from minor-planet number 86001 through 87000, inclusive. The primary data for this and other partial lists is based on JPL's "Small-Body Orbital Elements" and data available from the Minor Planet Center. Critical list information is also provided by the MPC, unless otherwise specified from Lowell Observatory. A detailed description of the table's columns and additional sources are given on the main page including a complete list of every page in this series, and a statistical break-up on the dynamical classification of minor planets.

Also see the summary list of all named bodies in numerical and alphabetical order, and the corresponding naming citations for the number range of this particular list. New namings may only be added to this list after official publication, as the preannouncement of names is condemned by the Working Group for Small Bodies Nomenclature of the International Astronomical Union.

Near-Earth obj.	MBA (inner)	MBA (outer)	Centaur
Mars-crosser	MBA (middle)	Jupiter trojan	Trans-Neptunian obj.
Unclassified

== 86001–86100 ==
Designation			Discovery			Properties		Ref
Permanent	Provisional	Named after	Date	Site	Discoverer(s)	Category	Diam.	Ref
86001	1999 JE_{80}	—	May 12, 1999	Socorro	LINEAR	·	8.1 km	MPC · JPL
86002	1999 JW_{85}	—	May 12, 1999	Socorro	LINEAR	·	6.3 km	MPC · JPL
86003	1999 JO_{86}	—	May 12, 1999	Socorro	LINEAR	·	3.3 km	MPC · JPL
86004	1999 JT_{86}	—	May 12, 1999	Socorro	LINEAR	EUN	3.5 km	MPC · JPL
86005	1999 JP_{87}	—	May 12, 1999	Socorro	LINEAR	·	4.7 km	MPC · JPL
86006	1999 JS_{87}	—	May 12, 1999	Socorro	LINEAR	·	4.4 km	MPC · JPL
86007	1999 JO_{90}	—	May 12, 1999	Socorro	LINEAR	·	4.4 km	MPC · JPL
86008	1999 JQ_{91}	—	May 12, 1999	Socorro	LINEAR	·	6.2 km	MPC · JPL
86009	1999 JW_{93}	—	May 12, 1999	Socorro	LINEAR	·	5.1 km	MPC · JPL
86010	1999 JS_{94}	—	May 12, 1999	Socorro	LINEAR	·	4.2 km	MPC · JPL
86011	1999 JU_{94}	—	May 12, 1999	Socorro	LINEAR	·	4.5 km	MPC · JPL
86012	1999 JG_{97}	—	May 12, 1999	Socorro	LINEAR	EUN	2.3 km	MPC · JPL
86013	1999 JX_{98}	—	May 12, 1999	Socorro	LINEAR	·	3.1 km	MPC · JPL
86014	1999 JE_{99}	—	May 12, 1999	Socorro	LINEAR	slow	4.3 km	MPC · JPL
86015	1999 JN_{99}	—	May 12, 1999	Socorro	LINEAR	EUN	2.7 km	MPC · JPL
86016	1999 JK_{100}	—	May 12, 1999	Socorro	LINEAR	·	3.5 km	MPC · JPL
86017	1999 JA_{101}	—	May 12, 1999	Socorro	LINEAR	HNS	4.1 km	MPC · JPL
86018	1999 JH_{115}	—	May 13, 1999	Socorro	LINEAR	·	3.5 km	MPC · JPL
86019	1999 JG_{127}	—	May 13, 1999	Socorro	LINEAR	slow	2.8 km	MPC · JPL
86020	1999 JP_{128}	—	May 12, 1999	Socorro	LINEAR	·	5.9 km	MPC · JPL
86021	1999 KQ_{4}	—	May 20, 1999	Socorro	LINEAR	·	8.2 km	MPC · JPL
86022	1999 KJ_{14}	—	May 18, 1999	Socorro	LINEAR	·	9.1 km	MPC · JPL
86023	1999 KT_{18}	—	May 22, 1999	McGraw-Hill	Parker, J. W.	·	5.0 km	MPC · JPL
86024	1999 LW_{3}	—	June 7, 1999	Socorro	LINEAR	·	9.1 km	MPC · JPL
86025	1999 LX_{3}	—	June 9, 1999	Socorro	LINEAR	·	1.5 km	MPC · JPL
86026	1999 LQ_{6}	—	June 7, 1999	Kitt Peak	Spacewatch	·	3.8 km	MPC · JPL
86027	1999 LL_{13}	—	June 9, 1999	Socorro	LINEAR	·	4.8 km	MPC · JPL
86028	1999 LR_{19}	—	June 9, 1999	Socorro	LINEAR	·	7.3 km	MPC · JPL
86029 Riccardopozzobon	1999 LV_{32}	Riccardopozzobon	June 8, 1999	Catalina	CSS	EUN	2.4 km	MPC · JPL
86030	1999 NS_{1}	—	July 12, 1999	Socorro	LINEAR	H	1.5 km	MPC · JPL
86031	1999 NR_{2}	—	July 13, 1999	Socorro	LINEAR	H	2.3 km	MPC · JPL
86032	1999 NK_{5}	—	July 13, 1999	Socorro	LINEAR	·	6.0 km	MPC · JPL
86033	1999 ND_{8}	—	July 13, 1999	Socorro	LINEAR	·	7.2 km	MPC · JPL
86034	1999 NU_{9}	—	July 13, 1999	Socorro	LINEAR	·	7.8 km	MPC · JPL
86035	1999 NH_{28}	—	July 14, 1999	Socorro	LINEAR	H	1.4 km	MPC · JPL
86036	1999 NS_{33}	—	July 14, 1999	Socorro	LINEAR	·	6.5 km	MPC · JPL
86037	1999 NN_{37}	—	July 14, 1999	Socorro	LINEAR	MAR ·	9.2 km	MPC · JPL
86038	1999 NY_{38}	—	July 14, 1999	Socorro	LINEAR	EOS	8.0 km	MPC · JPL
86039	1999 NC_{43}	—	July 14, 1999	Socorro	LINEAR	APO +1km · PHA · slow	2.2 km	MPC · JPL
86040	1999 NU_{43}	—	July 13, 1999	Socorro	LINEAR	DOR	5.2 km	MPC · JPL
86041	1999 NN_{56}	—	July 12, 1999	Socorro	LINEAR	slow	7.1 km	MPC · JPL
86042	1999 NH_{65}	—	July 12, 1999	Socorro	LINEAR	·	4.2 km	MPC · JPL
86043 Cévennes	1999 OE	Cévennes	July 16, 1999	Pises	Pises	·	5.2 km	MPC · JPL
86044	1999 OD_{2}	—	July 22, 1999	Socorro	LINEAR	·	7.7 km	MPC · JPL
86045	1999 ON_{2}	—	July 22, 1999	Socorro	LINEAR	H	1.8 km	MPC · JPL
86046	1999 OY_{2}	—	July 22, 1999	Socorro	LINEAR	T_{j} (2.98)	6.6 km	MPC · JPL
86047	1999 OY_{3}	—	July 18, 1999	Mauna Kea	Mauna Kea	Haumea	90 km	MPC · JPL
86048 Saint-Tropez	1999 PP_{1}	Saint-Tropez	August 9, 1999	Ondřejov	P. Pravec, P. Kušnirák	EOS	5.9 km	MPC · JPL
86049	1999 PH_{4}	—	August 13, 1999	Reedy Creek	J. Broughton	·	6.4 km	MPC · JPL
86050	1999 PG_{8}	—	August 12, 1999	Anderson Mesa	LONEOS	·	4.3 km	MPC · JPL
86051	1999 QB_{2}	—	August 22, 1999	Črni Vrh	Mikuž, H.	DOR	9.4 km	MPC · JPL
86052	1999 RM_{2}	—	September 4, 1999	Catalina	CSS	EOS · fast?	5.7 km	MPC · JPL
86053	1999 RY_{4}	—	September 3, 1999	Kitt Peak	Spacewatch	EUP	11 km	MPC · JPL
86054	1999 RH_{11}	—	September 7, 1999	Socorro	LINEAR	EOS	4.4 km	MPC · JPL
86055	1999 RO_{12}	—	September 7, 1999	Socorro	LINEAR	EOS	5.2 km	MPC · JPL
86056	1999 RE_{14}	—	September 7, 1999	Socorro	LINEAR	·	7.1 km	MPC · JPL
86057	1999 RV_{14}	—	September 7, 1999	Socorro	LINEAR	·	4.1 km	MPC · JPL
86058	1999 RO_{15}	—	September 7, 1999	Socorro	LINEAR	·	11 km	MPC · JPL
86059	1999 RX_{15}	—	September 7, 1999	Socorro	LINEAR	·	3.0 km	MPC · JPL
86060	1999 RO_{18}	—	September 7, 1999	Socorro	LINEAR	·	7.7 km	MPC · JPL
86061	1999 RT_{19}	—	September 7, 1999	Socorro	LINEAR	·	15 km	MPC · JPL
86062	1999 RJ_{20}	—	September 7, 1999	Socorro	LINEAR	EOS	5.7 km	MPC · JPL
86063	1999 RK_{25}	—	September 7, 1999	Socorro	LINEAR	·	5.6 km	MPC · JPL
86064	1999 RP_{26}	—	September 7, 1999	Socorro	LINEAR	HYG	5.8 km	MPC · JPL
86065	1999 RO_{27}	—	September 7, 1999	Višnjan Observatory	K. Korlević	·	5.8 km	MPC · JPL
86066	1999 RR_{27}	—	September 8, 1999	Višnjan Observatory	K. Korlević	·	3.8 km	MPC · JPL
86067	1999 RM_{28}	—	September 3, 1999	Siding Spring	R. H. McNaught	AMO +1km	1.2 km	MPC · JPL
86068	1999 RL_{30}	—	September 8, 1999	Socorro	LINEAR	H	1.3 km	MPC · JPL
86069	1999 RO_{32}	—	September 9, 1999	Višnjan Observatory	K. Korlević	·	10 km	MPC · JPL
86070	1999 RZ_{43}	—	September 15, 1999	Višnjan Observatory	K. Korlević	HYG	8.4 km	MPC · JPL
86071	1999 RR_{45}	—	September 8, 1999	Uccle	T. Pauwels	·	2.8 km	MPC · JPL
86072	1999 RW_{45}	—	September 12, 1999	Úpice	Vyskočil, L.	·	5.5 km	MPC · JPL
86073	1999 RX_{51}	—	September 7, 1999	Socorro	LINEAR	·	3.3 km	MPC · JPL
86074	1999 RA_{57}	—	September 7, 1999	Socorro	LINEAR	EOS	5.2 km	MPC · JPL
86075	1999 RJ_{58}	—	September 7, 1999	Socorro	LINEAR	V	1.7 km	MPC · JPL
86076	1999 RD_{65}	—	September 7, 1999	Socorro	LINEAR	EOS	3.1 km	MPC · JPL
86077	1999 RA_{67}	—	September 7, 1999	Socorro	LINEAR	EOS	3.9 km	MPC · JPL
86078	1999 RS_{67}	—	September 7, 1999	Socorro	LINEAR	V	1.5 km	MPC · JPL
86079	1999 RK_{70}	—	September 7, 1999	Socorro	LINEAR	EOS	3.3 km	MPC · JPL
86080	1999 RJ_{71}	—	September 7, 1999	Socorro	LINEAR	THM	4.7 km	MPC · JPL
86081	1999 RN_{73}	—	September 7, 1999	Socorro	LINEAR	·	5.2 km	MPC · JPL
86082	1999 RA_{74}	—	September 7, 1999	Socorro	LINEAR	BRA	2.7 km	MPC · JPL
86083	1999 RC_{74}	—	September 7, 1999	Socorro	LINEAR	·	5.4 km	MPC · JPL
86084	1999 RJ_{75}	—	September 7, 1999	Socorro	LINEAR	·	4.5 km	MPC · JPL
86085	1999 RW_{80}	—	September 7, 1999	Socorro	LINEAR	EOS	4.1 km	MPC · JPL
86086	1999 RR_{81}	—	September 7, 1999	Socorro	LINEAR	EOS	4.6 km	MPC · JPL
86087	1999 RZ_{86}	—	September 7, 1999	Socorro	LINEAR	·	3.9 km	MPC · JPL
86088	1999 RR_{88}	—	September 7, 1999	Socorro	LINEAR	HYG	9.6 km	MPC · JPL
86089	1999 RN_{89}	—	September 7, 1999	Socorro	LINEAR	·	4.4 km	MPC · JPL
86090	1999 RT_{90}	—	September 7, 1999	Socorro	LINEAR	fast	4.3 km	MPC · JPL
86091	1999 RF_{92}	—	September 7, 1999	Socorro	LINEAR	·	6.5 km	MPC · JPL
86092	1999 RW_{94}	—	September 7, 1999	Socorro	LINEAR	·	5.2 km	MPC · JPL
86093	1999 RZ_{95}	—	September 7, 1999	Socorro	LINEAR	VER	10 km	MPC · JPL
86094	1999 RW_{100}	—	September 8, 1999	Socorro	LINEAR	·	6.2 km	MPC · JPL
86095	1999 RZ_{100}	—	September 8, 1999	Socorro	LINEAR	·	14 km	MPC · JPL
86096	1999 RB_{103}	—	September 8, 1999	Socorro	LINEAR	·	8.2 km	MPC · JPL
86097	1999 RC_{104}	—	September 8, 1999	Socorro	LINEAR	EOS	5.8 km	MPC · JPL
86098	1999 RL_{105}	—	September 8, 1999	Socorro	LINEAR	·	5.9 km	MPC · JPL
86099	1999 RO_{106}	—	September 8, 1999	Socorro	LINEAR	·	4.9 km	MPC · JPL
86100	1999 RH_{107}	—	September 8, 1999	Socorro	LINEAR	HYG	5.2 km	MPC · JPL

== 86101–86200 ==
back to top

Designation			Discovery			Properties		Ref
Permanent	Provisional	Named after	Date	Site	Discoverer(s)	Category	Diam.	Ref
86101	1999 RY_{107}	—	September 8, 1999	Socorro	LINEAR	·	11 km	MPC · JPL
86102	1999 RP_{108}	—	September 8, 1999	Socorro	LINEAR	EOS	5.2 km	MPC · JPL
86103	1999 RB_{109}	—	September 8, 1999	Socorro	LINEAR	EOS	5.1 km	MPC · JPL
86104	1999 RF_{110}	—	September 8, 1999	Socorro	LINEAR	EOS	5.2 km	MPC · JPL
86105	1999 RG_{110}	—	September 8, 1999	Socorro	LINEAR	·	5.0 km	MPC · JPL
86106	1999 RP_{113}	—	September 9, 1999	Socorro	LINEAR	EOS · slow	5.6 km	MPC · JPL
86107	1999 RL_{115}	—	September 9, 1999	Socorro	LINEAR	·	4.5 km	MPC · JPL
86108	1999 RR_{116}	—	September 9, 1999	Socorro	LINEAR	·	7.6 km	MPC · JPL
86109	1999 RV_{118}	—	September 9, 1999	Socorro	LINEAR	EOS	5.5 km	MPC · JPL
86110	1999 RH_{123}	—	September 9, 1999	Socorro	LINEAR	EOS	7.0 km	MPC · JPL
86111	1999 RM_{123}	—	September 9, 1999	Socorro	LINEAR	EOS	4.8 km	MPC · JPL
86112	1999 RN_{123}	—	September 9, 1999	Socorro	LINEAR	NAE	10 km	MPC · JPL
86113	1999 RC_{129}	—	September 9, 1999	Socorro	LINEAR	·	13 km	MPC · JPL
86114	1999 RD_{130}	—	September 9, 1999	Socorro	LINEAR	EOS	5.1 km	MPC · JPL
86115	1999 RF_{133}	—	September 9, 1999	Socorro	LINEAR	EOS	5.9 km	MPC · JPL
86116	1999 RR_{133}	—	September 9, 1999	Socorro	LINEAR	·	4.2 km	MPC · JPL
86117	1999 RC_{135}	—	September 9, 1999	Socorro	LINEAR	·	4.5 km	MPC · JPL
86118	1999 RD_{138}	—	September 9, 1999	Socorro	LINEAR	·	5.6 km	MPC · JPL
86119	1999 RA_{140}	—	September 9, 1999	Socorro	LINEAR	·	3.8 km	MPC · JPL
86120	1999 RM_{140}	—	September 9, 1999	Socorro	LINEAR	·	5.1 km	MPC · JPL
86121	1999 RE_{144}	—	September 9, 1999	Socorro	LINEAR	·	4.1 km	MPC · JPL
86122	1999 RH_{144}	—	September 9, 1999	Socorro	LINEAR	EOS	7.6 km	MPC · JPL
86123	1999 RQ_{144}	—	September 9, 1999	Socorro	LINEAR	EOS	3.5 km	MPC · JPL
86124	1999 RK_{147}	—	September 9, 1999	Socorro	LINEAR	EOS	4.5 km	MPC · JPL
86125	1999 RH_{152}	—	September 9, 1999	Socorro	LINEAR	EOS	4.2 km	MPC · JPL
86126	1999 RV_{152}	—	September 9, 1999	Socorro	LINEAR	·	3.8 km	MPC · JPL
86127	1999 RB_{154}	—	September 9, 1999	Socorro	LINEAR	·	5.8 km	MPC · JPL
86128	1999 RC_{154}	—	September 9, 1999	Socorro	LINEAR	EOS · slow	5.6 km	MPC · JPL
86129	1999 RO_{155}	—	September 9, 1999	Socorro	LINEAR	EOS · slow	6.3 km	MPC · JPL
86130	1999 RN_{156}	—	September 9, 1999	Socorro	LINEAR	EOS	5.6 km	MPC · JPL
86131	1999 RV_{159}	—	September 9, 1999	Socorro	LINEAR	·	6.5 km	MPC · JPL
86132	1999 RJ_{165}	—	September 9, 1999	Socorro	LINEAR	·	2.8 km	MPC · JPL
86133	1999 RA_{171}	—	September 9, 1999	Socorro	LINEAR	·	5.8 km	MPC · JPL
86134	1999 RZ_{171}	—	September 9, 1999	Socorro	LINEAR	·	7.4 km	MPC · JPL
86135	1999 RK_{172}	—	September 9, 1999	Socorro	LINEAR	·	6.0 km	MPC · JPL
86136	1999 RZ_{172}	—	September 9, 1999	Socorro	LINEAR	·	3.5 km	MPC · JPL
86137	1999 RN_{174}	—	September 9, 1999	Socorro	LINEAR	·	5.0 km	MPC · JPL
86138	1999 RL_{175}	—	September 9, 1999	Socorro	LINEAR	·	6.9 km	MPC · JPL
86139	1999 RT_{182}	—	September 9, 1999	Socorro	LINEAR	HYG	5.4 km	MPC · JPL
86140	1999 RA_{183}	—	September 9, 1999	Socorro	LINEAR	·	15 km	MPC · JPL
86141	1999 RD_{184}	—	September 9, 1999	Socorro	LINEAR	(6355)	11 km	MPC · JPL
86142	1999 RJ_{184}	—	September 9, 1999	Socorro	LINEAR	·	8.7 km	MPC · JPL
86143	1999 RV_{186}	—	September 9, 1999	Socorro	LINEAR	·	4.6 km	MPC · JPL
86144	1999 RK_{191}	—	September 11, 1999	Socorro	LINEAR	EOS	4.2 km	MPC · JPL
86145	1999 RU_{191}	—	September 11, 1999	Socorro	LINEAR	·	6.0 km	MPC · JPL
86146	1999 RA_{194}	—	September 7, 1999	Socorro	LINEAR	HYG	7.3 km	MPC · JPL
86147	1999 RB_{196}	—	September 8, 1999	Socorro	LINEAR	·	3.5 km	MPC · JPL
86148	1999 RV_{196}	—	September 8, 1999	Socorro	LINEAR	EOS	4.7 km	MPC · JPL
86149	1999 RA_{199}	—	September 10, 1999	Socorro	LINEAR	·	7.6 km	MPC · JPL
86150	1999 RP_{200}	—	September 8, 1999	Socorro	LINEAR	·	4.8 km	MPC · JPL
86151	1999 RW_{200}	—	September 8, 1999	Socorro	LINEAR	·	6.2 km	MPC · JPL
86152	1999 RZ_{200}	—	September 8, 1999	Socorro	LINEAR	·	8.7 km	MPC · JPL
86153	1999 RE_{201}	—	September 8, 1999	Socorro	LINEAR	(5931)	12 km	MPC · JPL
86154	1999 RH_{201}	—	September 8, 1999	Socorro	LINEAR	·	7.3 km	MPC · JPL
86155	1999 RS_{201}	—	September 8, 1999	Socorro	LINEAR	·	9.2 km	MPC · JPL
86156	1999 RB_{203}	—	September 8, 1999	Socorro	LINEAR	URS	11 km	MPC · JPL
86157	1999 RW_{203}	—	September 8, 1999	Socorro	LINEAR	·	7.0 km	MPC · JPL
86158	1999 RY_{203}	—	September 8, 1999	Socorro	LINEAR	·	7.5 km	MPC · JPL
86159	1999 RB_{204}	—	September 8, 1999	Socorro	LINEAR	·	7.3 km	MPC · JPL
86160	1999 RM_{205}	—	September 8, 1999	Socorro	LINEAR	·	5.6 km	MPC · JPL
86161	1999 RQ_{205}	—	September 8, 1999	Socorro	LINEAR	·	9.5 km	MPC · JPL
86162	1999 RR_{205}	—	September 8, 1999	Socorro	LINEAR	EOS	11 km	MPC · JPL
86163	1999 RT_{205}	—	September 8, 1999	Socorro	LINEAR	EOS	7.7 km	MPC · JPL
86164	1999 RG_{207}	—	September 8, 1999	Socorro	LINEAR	VER	7.0 km	MPC · JPL
86165	1999 RZ_{207}	—	September 8, 1999	Socorro	LINEAR	EOS	4.5 km	MPC · JPL
86166	1999 RE_{208}	—	September 8, 1999	Socorro	LINEAR	·	4.0 km	MPC · JPL
86167	1999 RM_{209}	—	September 8, 1999	Socorro	LINEAR	·	6.4 km	MPC · JPL
86168	1999 RQ_{209}	—	September 8, 1999	Socorro	LINEAR	EOS	7.8 km	MPC · JPL
86169	1999 RW_{209}	—	September 8, 1999	Socorro	LINEAR	EOS	3.7 km	MPC · JPL
86170	1999 RJ_{210}	—	September 8, 1999	Socorro	LINEAR	EOS	6.3 km	MPC · JPL
86171	1999 RO_{211}	—	September 8, 1999	Socorro	LINEAR	EUP · fast	10 km	MPC · JPL
86172	1999 RP_{211}	—	September 8, 1999	Socorro	LINEAR	EOS	4.8 km	MPC · JPL
86173	1999 RH_{212}	—	September 8, 1999	Socorro	LINEAR	EOS	4.2 km	MPC · JPL
86174	1999 RV_{212}	—	September 8, 1999	Socorro	LINEAR	EOS	5.0 km	MPC · JPL
86175	1999 RE_{213}	—	September 10, 1999	Socorro	LINEAR	·	6.3 km	MPC · JPL
86176	1999 RO_{214}	—	September 5, 1999	Anderson Mesa	LONEOS	slow	8.9 km	MPC · JPL
86177	1999 RY_{215}	—	September 8, 1999	Mauna Kea	Mauna Kea	cubewano (hot)	263 km	MPC · JPL
86178	1999 RP_{218}	—	September 4, 1999	Catalina	CSS	·	4.6 km	MPC · JPL
86179	1999 RW_{220}	—	September 5, 1999	Catalina	CSS	EOS	4.2 km	MPC · JPL
86180	1999 RG_{221}	—	September 5, 1999	Anderson Mesa	LONEOS	·	6.6 km	MPC · JPL
86181	1999 RU_{222}	—	September 7, 1999	Catalina	CSS	EOS	5.9 km	MPC · JPL
86182	1999 RA_{223}	—	September 7, 1999	Catalina	CSS	·	9.1 km	MPC · JPL
86183	1999 RY_{223}	—	September 7, 1999	Catalina	CSS	EOS	4.0 km	MPC · JPL
86184	1999 RL_{230}	—	September 8, 1999	Catalina	CSS	·	4.3 km	MPC · JPL
86185	1999 RN_{230}	—	September 8, 1999	Catalina	CSS	·	11 km	MPC · JPL
86186	1999 RX_{234}	—	September 8, 1999	Catalina	CSS	EOS	4.6 km	MPC · JPL
86187	1999 RQ_{239}	—	September 8, 1999	Anderson Mesa	LONEOS	·	6.5 km	MPC · JPL
86188	1999 RV_{241}	—	September 14, 1999	Catalina	CSS	HYG	5.6 km	MPC · JPL
86189	1999 RK_{242}	—	September 4, 1999	Catalina	CSS	·	4.3 km	MPC · JPL
86190	1999 RQ_{247}	—	September 5, 1999	Anderson Mesa	LONEOS	·	4.2 km	MPC · JPL
86191	1999 RY_{251}	—	September 6, 1999	Catalina	CSS	·	6.6 km	MPC · JPL
86192	1999 SV_{1}	—	September 18, 1999	Socorro	LINEAR	H	2.0 km	MPC · JPL
86193	1999 SA_{2}	—	September 18, 1999	Socorro	LINEAR	H	1.2 km	MPC · JPL
86194	1999 SD_{2}	—	September 18, 1999	Socorro	LINEAR	H	2.1 km	MPC · JPL
86195 Cireglio	1999 ST_{9}	Cireglio	September 30, 1999	San Marcello	L. Tesi, G. Forti	·	6.8 km	MPC · JPL
86196 Specula	1999 SC_{10}	Specula	September 24, 1999	Piszkéstető	K. Sárneczky, L. Kiss	TIR	3.0 km	MPC · JPL
86197	1999 SP_{15}	—	September 30, 1999	Catalina	CSS	EOS	3.9 km	MPC · JPL
86198	1999 SO_{16}	—	September 29, 1999	Catalina	CSS	EOS	3.7 km	MPC · JPL
86199	1999 SS_{20}	—	September 30, 1999	Catalina	CSS	·	7.0 km	MPC · JPL
86200	1999 SE_{26}	—	September 30, 1999	Catalina	CSS	LIX	7.8 km	MPC · JPL

== 86201–86300 ==
back to top

Designation			Discovery			Properties		Ref
Permanent	Provisional	Named after	Date	Site	Discoverer(s)	Category	Diam.	Ref
86201	1999 TD_{1}	—	October 1, 1999	Višnjan Observatory	K. Korlević	·	6.5 km	MPC · JPL
86202	1999 TT_{1}	—	October 1, 1999	Višnjan Observatory	K. Korlević	LIX	11 km	MPC · JPL
86203	1999 TA_{2}	—	October 2, 1999	Fountain Hills	C. W. Juels	·	5.3 km	MPC · JPL
86204	1999 TQ_{2}	—	October 2, 1999	Fountain Hills	C. W. Juels	·	6.7 km	MPC · JPL
86205	1999 TC_{3}	—	October 4, 1999	Prescott	P. G. Comba	·	9.0 km	MPC · JPL
86206	1999 TK_{9}	—	October 7, 1999	Višnjan Observatory	K. Korlević, M. Jurić	slow	6.5 km	MPC · JPL
86207	1999 TP_{15}	—	October 7, 1999	Višnjan Observatory	K. Korlević, M. Jurić	·	5.1 km	MPC · JPL
86208	1999 TD_{16}	—	October 11, 1999	Črni Vrh	Mikuž, H.	·	9.6 km	MPC · JPL
86209	1999 TZ_{16}	—	October 7, 1999	Giesing Obs.	Sala, P.	·	4.6 km	MPC · JPL
86210	1999 TT_{20}	—	October 7, 1999	Goodricke-Pigott	R. A. Tucker	·	4.7 km	MPC · JPL
86211	1999 TW_{20}	—	October 7, 1999	Goodricke-Pigott	R. A. Tucker	·	5.1 km	MPC · JPL
86212	1999 TG_{21}	—	October 3, 1999	Socorro	LINEAR	·	2.6 km	MPC · JPL
86213	1999 TY_{24}	—	October 2, 1999	Socorro	LINEAR	EOS	5.5 km	MPC · JPL
86214	1999 TC_{29}	—	October 4, 1999	Socorro	LINEAR	·	8.9 km	MPC · JPL
86215	1999 TY_{31}	—	October 4, 1999	Socorro	LINEAR	·	7.5 km	MPC · JPL
86216	1999 TV_{32}	—	October 4, 1999	Socorro	LINEAR	EOS	4.2 km	MPC · JPL
86217	1999 TB_{35}	—	October 3, 1999	Socorro	LINEAR	H	1.8 km	MPC · JPL
86218	1999 TH_{37}	—	October 13, 1999	Anderson Mesa	LONEOS	EOS	4.7 km	MPC · JPL
86219	1999 TR_{37}	—	October 1, 1999	Catalina	CSS	EOS	4.7 km	MPC · JPL
86220	1999 TX_{60}	—	October 7, 1999	Kitt Peak	Spacewatch	·	4.9 km	MPC · JPL
86221	1999 TY_{65}	—	October 8, 1999	Kitt Peak	Spacewatch	HYG	5.0 km	MPC · JPL
86222	1999 TJ_{85}	—	October 14, 1999	Kitt Peak	Spacewatch	·	4.5 km	MPC · JPL
86223	1999 TE_{96}	—	October 2, 1999	Socorro	LINEAR	EOS	4.3 km	MPC · JPL
86224	1999 TJ_{97}	—	October 2, 1999	Socorro	LINEAR	·	5.8 km	MPC · JPL
86225	1999 TV_{97}	—	October 2, 1999	Socorro	LINEAR	·	4.8 km	MPC · JPL
86226	1999 TC_{102}	—	October 2, 1999	Socorro	LINEAR	EOS	5.4 km	MPC · JPL
86227	1999 TM_{102}	—	October 2, 1999	Socorro	LINEAR	·	4.5 km	MPC · JPL
86228	1999 TW_{107}	—	October 4, 1999	Socorro	LINEAR	EOS	4.8 km	MPC · JPL
86229	1999 TZ_{107}	—	October 4, 1999	Socorro	LINEAR	·	9.3 km	MPC · JPL
86230	1999 TH_{108}	—	October 4, 1999	Socorro	LINEAR	·	9.5 km	MPC · JPL
86231	1999 TU_{109}	—	October 4, 1999	Socorro	LINEAR	TEL	4.6 km	MPC · JPL
86232	1999 TG_{111}	—	October 4, 1999	Socorro	LINEAR	EMA	11 km	MPC · JPL
86233	1999 TT_{111}	—	October 4, 1999	Socorro	LINEAR	·	6.5 km	MPC · JPL
86234	1999 TY_{111}	—	October 4, 1999	Socorro	LINEAR	·	8.8 km	MPC · JPL
86235	1999 TW_{114}	—	October 4, 1999	Socorro	LINEAR	HYG	7.0 km	MPC · JPL
86236	1999 TJ_{115}	—	October 4, 1999	Socorro	LINEAR	·	7.4 km	MPC · JPL
86237	1999 TQ_{116}	—	October 4, 1999	Socorro	LINEAR	THM	4.2 km	MPC · JPL
86238	1999 TJ_{118}	—	October 4, 1999	Socorro	LINEAR	NAE	14 km	MPC · JPL
86239	1999 TV_{118}	—	October 4, 1999	Socorro	LINEAR	·	6.4 km	MPC · JPL
86240	1999 TU_{119}	—	October 4, 1999	Socorro	LINEAR	HYG	7.5 km	MPC · JPL
86241	1999 TE_{120}	—	October 4, 1999	Socorro	LINEAR	EOS	6.4 km	MPC · JPL
86242	1999 TT_{127}	—	October 4, 1999	Socorro	LINEAR	HYG	5.6 km	MPC · JPL
86243	1999 TW_{130}	—	October 6, 1999	Socorro	LINEAR	·	7.0 km	MPC · JPL
86244	1999 TA_{132}	—	October 6, 1999	Socorro	LINEAR	·	3.9 km	MPC · JPL
86245	1999 TN_{143}	—	October 7, 1999	Socorro	LINEAR	URS	8.2 km	MPC · JPL
86246	1999 TO_{143}	—	October 7, 1999	Socorro	LINEAR	·	7.8 km	MPC · JPL
86247	1999 TP_{145}	—	October 7, 1999	Socorro	LINEAR	HYG	7.8 km	MPC · JPL
86248	1999 TT_{154}	—	October 7, 1999	Socorro	LINEAR	·	6.8 km	MPC · JPL
86249	1999 TU_{160}	—	October 9, 1999	Socorro	LINEAR	·	4.1 km	MPC · JPL
86250	1999 TV_{172}	—	October 10, 1999	Socorro	LINEAR	·	7.7 km	MPC · JPL
86251	1999 TE_{183}	—	October 11, 1999	Socorro	LINEAR	HYG	5.8 km	MPC · JPL
86252	1999 TG_{186}	—	October 12, 1999	Socorro	LINEAR	·	8.2 km	MPC · JPL
86253	1999 TT_{188}	—	October 12, 1999	Socorro	LINEAR	·	9.3 km	MPC · JPL
86254	1999 TV_{188}	—	October 12, 1999	Socorro	LINEAR	·	6.3 km	MPC · JPL
86255	1999 TC_{189}	—	October 12, 1999	Socorro	LINEAR	·	9.8 km	MPC · JPL
86256	1999 TQ_{190}	—	October 12, 1999	Socorro	LINEAR	·	7.2 km	MPC · JPL
86257	1999 TK_{207}	—	October 14, 1999	Socorro	LINEAR	H	2.3 km	MPC · JPL
86258	1999 TK_{208}	—	October 14, 1999	Socorro	LINEAR	·	6.0 km	MPC · JPL
86259	1999 TC_{229}	—	October 4, 1999	Socorro	LINEAR	EOS	5.9 km	MPC · JPL
86260	1999 TT_{232}	—	October 5, 1999	Catalina	CSS	TIR	4.4 km	MPC · JPL
86261	1999 TS_{233}	—	October 3, 1999	Socorro	LINEAR	EOS	6.0 km	MPC · JPL
86262	1999 TE_{237}	—	October 3, 1999	Catalina	CSS	HYG	6.1 km	MPC · JPL
86263	1999 TP_{244}	—	October 12, 1999	Socorro	LINEAR	H	1.4 km	MPC · JPL
86264	1999 TK_{249}	—	October 9, 1999	Catalina	CSS	LIX	7.8 km	MPC · JPL
86265	1999 TT_{249}	—	October 9, 1999	Catalina	CSS	·	7.3 km	MPC · JPL
86266	1999 TX_{255}	—	October 9, 1999	Kitt Peak	Spacewatch	·	5.7 km	MPC · JPL
86267	1999 TM_{256}	—	October 9, 1999	Socorro	LINEAR	THM	5.2 km	MPC · JPL
86268	1999 TK_{269}	—	October 3, 1999	Socorro	LINEAR	VER	5.9 km	MPC · JPL
86269	1999 TC_{272}	—	October 3, 1999	Socorro	LINEAR	·	10 km	MPC · JPL
86270	1999 TZ_{279}	—	October 7, 1999	Socorro	LINEAR	THM	7.0 km	MPC · JPL
86271	1999 TR_{280}	—	October 8, 1999	Socorro	LINEAR	·	5.8 km	MPC · JPL
86272	1999 TD_{286}	—	October 10, 1999	Socorro	LINEAR	·	8.2 km	MPC · JPL
86273	1999 TX_{292}	—	October 12, 1999	Socorro	LINEAR	·	8.7 km	MPC · JPL
86274	1999 TK_{310}	—	October 3, 1999	Anderson Mesa	LONEOS	·	4.6 km	MPC · JPL
86275	1999 TA_{320}	—	October 10, 1999	Socorro	LINEAR	CYB	8.1 km	MPC · JPL
86276	1999 TA_{323}	—	October 3, 1999	Catalina	CSS	·	4.2 km	MPC · JPL
86277	1999 TS_{323}	—	October 14, 1999	Socorro	LINEAR	·	8.9 km	MPC · JPL
86278	1999 UN	—	October 16, 1999	Višnjan Observatory	K. Korlević	·	4.3 km	MPC · JPL
86279 Brucegary	1999 UJ_{1}	Brucegary	October 17, 1999	Junk Bond	J. Medkeff	H	1.6 km	MPC · JPL
86280	1999 UQ_{9}	—	October 31, 1999	Socorro	LINEAR	H	1.9 km	MPC · JPL
86281	1999 UZ_{10}	—	October 31, 1999	Socorro	LINEAR	·	16 km	MPC · JPL
86282	1999 UU_{15}	—	October 29, 1999	Catalina	CSS	TEL	3.1 km	MPC · JPL
86283	1999 UP_{24}	—	October 28, 1999	Catalina	CSS	·	7.6 km	MPC · JPL
86284	1999 UA_{28}	—	October 30, 1999	Kitt Peak	Spacewatch	·	2.1 km	MPC · JPL
86285	1999 UR_{39}	—	October 31, 1999	Kitt Peak	Spacewatch	VER	9.1 km	MPC · JPL
86286	1999 UQ_{43}	—	October 28, 1999	Catalina	CSS	·	3.7 km	MPC · JPL
86287	1999 UX_{44}	—	October 30, 1999	Anderson Mesa	LONEOS	·	12 km	MPC · JPL
86288	1999 UC_{45}	—	October 31, 1999	Catalina	CSS	·	12 km	MPC · JPL
86289	1999 US_{46}	—	October 31, 1999	Anderson Mesa	LONEOS	·	5.8 km	MPC · JPL
86290	1999 UH_{47}	—	October 29, 1999	Catalina	CSS	HYG	6.0 km	MPC · JPL
86291	1999 UZ_{49}	—	October 30, 1999	Catalina	CSS	·	7.3 km	MPC · JPL
86292	1999 VY_{11}	—	November 10, 1999	Fountain Hills	C. W. Juels	·	7.8 km	MPC · JPL
86293	1999 VX_{12}	—	November 1, 1999	Socorro	LINEAR	·	8.5 km	MPC · JPL
86294	1999 VM_{13}	—	November 2, 1999	Socorro	LINEAR	H	1.6 km	MPC · JPL
86295	1999 VZ_{14}	—	November 2, 1999	Kitt Peak	Spacewatch	·	4.9 km	MPC · JPL
86296	1999 VA_{21}	—	November 9, 1999	Dynic	A. Sugie	H	1.4 km	MPC · JPL
86297	1999 VP_{21}	—	November 12, 1999	Višnjan Observatory	K. Korlević	·	12 km	MPC · JPL
86298	1999 VO_{22}	—	November 13, 1999	Fountain Hills	C. W. Juels	·	4.6 km	MPC · JPL
86299	1999 VB_{26}	—	November 3, 1999	Socorro	LINEAR	PHO	2.3 km	MPC · JPL
86300	1999 VU_{33}	—	November 3, 1999	Socorro	LINEAR	·	4.6 km	MPC · JPL

== 86301–86400 ==
back to top

Designation			Discovery			Properties		Ref
Permanent	Provisional	Named after	Date	Site	Discoverer(s)	Category	Diam.	Ref
86301	1999 VL_{43}	—	November 1, 1999	Catalina	CSS	·	4.9 km	MPC · JPL
86302	1999 VJ_{46}	—	November 3, 1999	Socorro	LINEAR	H	1.4 km	MPC · JPL
86303	1999 VL_{58}	—	November 4, 1999	Socorro	LINEAR	THM	7.4 km	MPC · JPL
86304	1999 VC_{60}	—	November 4, 1999	Socorro	LINEAR	THM	5.5 km	MPC · JPL
86305	1999 VN_{66}	—	November 4, 1999	Socorro	LINEAR	HYG · fast	5.1 km	MPC · JPL
86306	1999 VQ_{67}	—	November 4, 1999	Socorro	LINEAR	·	8.1 km	MPC · JPL
86307	1999 VL_{78}	—	November 4, 1999	Socorro	LINEAR	·	3.2 km	MPC · JPL
86308	1999 VN_{85}	—	November 5, 1999	Catalina	CSS	T_{j} (2.99) · EUP	10 km	MPC · JPL
86309	1999 VA_{90}	—	November 5, 1999	Socorro	LINEAR	·	1.2 km	MPC · JPL
86310	1999 VK_{96}	—	November 9, 1999	Socorro	LINEAR	fast	5.2 km	MPC · JPL
86311	1999 VE_{126}	—	November 9, 1999	Kitt Peak	Spacewatch	THM	4.7 km	MPC · JPL
86312	1999 VC_{146}	—	November 12, 1999	Socorro	LINEAR	·	7.0 km	MPC · JPL
86313	1999 VL_{159}	—	November 14, 1999	Socorro	LINEAR	·	8.0 km	MPC · JPL
86314	1999 VX_{161}	—	November 14, 1999	Socorro	LINEAR	·	5.6 km	MPC · JPL
86315	1999 VU_{177}	—	November 6, 1999	Socorro	LINEAR	·	4.3 km	MPC · JPL
86316	1999 VS_{179}	—	November 6, 1999	Socorro	LINEAR	EOS	3.4 km	MPC · JPL
86317	1999 VH_{192}	—	November 1, 1999	Anderson Mesa	LONEOS	·	12 km	MPC · JPL
86318	1999 VS_{192}	—	November 1, 1999	Anderson Mesa	LONEOS	EUP	6.7 km	MPC · JPL
86319	1999 VF_{199}	—	November 1, 1999	Catalina	CSS	fast	8.0 km	MPC · JPL
86320	1999 VT_{199}	—	November 4, 1999	Anderson Mesa	LONEOS	·	6.7 km	MPC · JPL
86321	1999 VS_{202}	—	November 4, 1999	Socorro	LINEAR	H	1.7 km	MPC · JPL
86322	1999 VJ_{216}	—	November 3, 1999	Socorro	LINEAR	·	4.3 km	MPC · JPL
86323	1999 VJ_{219}	—	November 3, 1999	Socorro	LINEAR	HYG	6.9 km	MPC · JPL
86324	1999 WA_{2}	—	November 16, 1999	Socorro	LINEAR	AMO +1km	2.1 km	MPC · JPL
86325	1999 WC_{6}	—	November 28, 1999	Višnjan Observatory	K. Korlević	·	7.2 km	MPC · JPL
86326	1999 WK_{13}	—	November 30, 1999	Socorro	LINEAR	AMO +1km	1.3 km	MPC · JPL
86327	1999 WM_{13}	—	November 29, 1999	Višnjan Observatory	K. Korlević	·	5.5 km	MPC · JPL
86328	1999 XX_{3}	—	December 4, 1999	Catalina	CSS	·	8.6 km	MPC · JPL
86329	1999 XZ_{7}	—	December 2, 1999	Anderson Mesa	LONEOS	H	1.4 km	MPC · JPL
86330	1999 XR_{14}	—	December 6, 1999	Socorro	LINEAR	H	1.3 km	MPC · JPL
86331	1999 XY_{19}	—	December 5, 1999	Socorro	LINEAR	·	12 km	MPC · JPL
86332	1999 XG_{21}	—	December 5, 1999	Socorro	LINEAR	·	4.0 km	MPC · JPL
86333	1999 XA_{26}	—	December 6, 1999	Socorro	LINEAR	·	4.3 km	MPC · JPL
86334	1999 XO_{27}	—	December 6, 1999	Socorro	LINEAR	THM	7.1 km	MPC · JPL
86335	1999 XP_{29}	—	December 6, 1999	Socorro	LINEAR	·	9.2 km	MPC · JPL
86336	1999 XD_{32}	—	December 6, 1999	Socorro	LINEAR	·	2.3 km	MPC · JPL
86337	1999 XP_{32}	—	December 6, 1999	Socorro	LINEAR	·	2.0 km	MPC · JPL
86338	1999 XK_{34}	—	December 6, 1999	Socorro	LINEAR	·	1.8 km	MPC · JPL
86339	1999 XV_{40}	—	December 7, 1999	Socorro	LINEAR	·	10 km	MPC · JPL
86340	1999 XQ_{49}	—	December 7, 1999	Socorro	LINEAR	·	1.0 km	MPC · JPL
86341	1999 XH_{54}	—	December 7, 1999	Socorro	LINEAR	THM	4.8 km	MPC · JPL
86342	1999 XP_{54}	—	December 7, 1999	Socorro	LINEAR	·	2.0 km	MPC · JPL
86343	1999 XZ_{56}	—	December 7, 1999	Socorro	LINEAR	(11097) · CYB · 2:1J	5.7 km	MPC · JPL
86344	1999 XA_{67}	—	December 7, 1999	Socorro	LINEAR	·	1.7 km	MPC · JPL
86345	1999 XE_{84}	—	December 7, 1999	Socorro	LINEAR	·	1.4 km	MPC · JPL
86346	1999 XO_{84}	—	December 7, 1999	Socorro	LINEAR	·	1.8 km	MPC · JPL
86347	1999 XU_{89}	—	December 7, 1999	Socorro	LINEAR	·	1.7 km	MPC · JPL
86348	1999 XF_{102}	—	December 7, 1999	Socorro	LINEAR	·	10 km	MPC · JPL
86349	1999 XO_{102}	—	December 7, 1999	Socorro	LINEAR	·	1.4 km	MPC · JPL
86350	1999 XW_{102}	—	December 7, 1999	Socorro	LINEAR	·	2.0 km	MPC · JPL
86351	1999 XS_{105}	—	December 11, 1999	Oizumi	T. Kobayashi	·	1.4 km	MPC · JPL
86352	1999 XR_{111}	—	December 7, 1999	Socorro	LINEAR	·	2.4 km	MPC · JPL
86353	1999 XX_{113}	—	December 11, 1999	Socorro	LINEAR	·	6.8 km	MPC · JPL
86354	1999 XB_{116}	—	December 5, 1999	Catalina	CSS	EOS	4.3 km	MPC · JPL
86355	1999 XF_{116}	—	December 5, 1999	Catalina	CSS	·	1.9 km	MPC · JPL
86356	1999 XR_{122}	—	December 7, 1999	Catalina	CSS	·	7.0 km	MPC · JPL
86357	1999 XF_{123}	—	December 7, 1999	Catalina	CSS	·	7.3 km	MPC · JPL
86358	1999 XB_{143}	—	December 14, 1999	Fountain Hills	C. W. Juels	2:1J	13 km	MPC · JPL
86359	1999 XQ_{143}	—	December 15, 1999	Socorro	LINEAR	H	1.6 km	MPC · JPL
86360	1999 XR_{162}	—	December 8, 1999	Catalina	CSS	·	11 km	MPC · JPL
86361	1999 XE_{178}	—	December 10, 1999	Socorro	LINEAR	·	9.0 km	MPC · JPL
86362	1999 XS_{178}	—	December 10, 1999	Socorro	LINEAR	·	4.2 km	MPC · JPL
86363	1999 XT_{179}	—	December 10, 1999	Socorro	LINEAR	·	2.9 km	MPC · JPL
86364	1999 XC_{194}	—	December 12, 1999	Socorro	LINEAR	(1298)	10 km	MPC · JPL
86365	1999 XH_{207}	—	December 12, 1999	Socorro	LINEAR	·	2.0 km	MPC · JPL
86366	1999 XO_{213}	—	December 14, 1999	Socorro	LINEAR	T_{j} (2.99) · 3:2	10 km	MPC · JPL
86367	1999 XY_{223}	—	December 13, 1999	Kitt Peak	Spacewatch	CYB · 2:1J (unstable)	6.3 km	MPC · JPL
86368	1999 XB_{225}	—	December 13, 1999	Kitt Peak	Spacewatch	·	1.4 km	MPC · JPL
86369	1999 XK_{226}	—	December 14, 1999	Kitt Peak	Spacewatch	·	1.9 km	MPC · JPL
86370	1999 XR_{228}	—	December 14, 1999	Kitt Peak	Spacewatch	·	1.2 km	MPC · JPL
86371	1999 XZ_{234}	—	December 3, 1999	Anderson Mesa	LONEOS	SYL · CYB	9.8 km	MPC · JPL
86372	1999 XA_{254}	—	December 12, 1999	Kitt Peak	Spacewatch	·	3.6 km	MPC · JPL
86373	1999 YK	—	December 16, 1999	Socorro	LINEAR	H	1.7 km	MPC · JPL
86374	1999 YD_{3}	—	December 17, 1999	Socorro	LINEAR	H	1.4 km	MPC · JPL
86375	2000 AT_{2}	—	January 1, 2000	San Marcello	L. Tesi, M. Tombelli	·	3.3 km	MPC · JPL
86376	2000 AX_{4}	—	January 2, 2000	San Marcello	L. Tesi, A. Boattini	·	1.6 km	MPC · JPL
86377	2000 AQ_{12}	—	January 3, 2000	Socorro	LINEAR	L4	20 km	MPC · JPL
86378	2000 AV_{18}	—	January 3, 2000	Socorro	LINEAR	·	4.2 km	MPC · JPL
86379	2000 AY_{26}	—	January 3, 2000	Socorro	LINEAR	·	1.9 km	MPC · JPL
86380	2000 AD_{40}	—	January 3, 2000	Socorro	LINEAR	·	1.9 km	MPC · JPL
86381	2000 AM_{40}	—	January 3, 2000	Socorro	LINEAR	·	1.8 km	MPC · JPL
86382	2000 AY_{41}	—	January 3, 2000	Socorro	LINEAR	·	1.7 km	MPC · JPL
86383	2000 AJ_{42}	—	January 3, 2000	Socorro	LINEAR	H	1.6 km	MPC · JPL
86384	2000 AS_{47}	—	January 4, 2000	Socorro	LINEAR	·	1.9 km	MPC · JPL
86385	2000 AK_{51}	—	January 4, 2000	Socorro	LINEAR	·	10 km	MPC · JPL
86386	2000 AN_{56}	—	January 4, 2000	Socorro	LINEAR	·	1.9 km	MPC · JPL
86387	2000 AG_{60}	—	January 4, 2000	Socorro	LINEAR	·	1.4 km	MPC · JPL
86388	2000 AT_{60}	—	January 4, 2000	Socorro	LINEAR	·	1.7 km	MPC · JPL
86389	2000 AM_{67}	—	January 4, 2000	Socorro	LINEAR	·	1.9 km	MPC · JPL
86390	2000 AW_{74}	—	January 5, 2000	Socorro	LINEAR	·	1.3 km	MPC · JPL
86391	2000 AE_{87}	—	January 5, 2000	Socorro	LINEAR	·	1.5 km	MPC · JPL
86392	2000 AH_{90}	—	January 5, 2000	Socorro	LINEAR	·	1.3 km	MPC · JPL
86393	2000 AG_{112}	—	January 5, 2000	Socorro	LINEAR	·	3.3 km	MPC · JPL
86394	2000 AH_{124}	—	January 5, 2000	Socorro	LINEAR	·	1.6 km	MPC · JPL
86395	2000 AM_{124}	—	January 5, 2000	Socorro	LINEAR	·	3.7 km	MPC · JPL
86396	2000 AB_{129}	—	January 5, 2000	Socorro	LINEAR	·	2.7 km	MPC · JPL
86397	2000 AF_{138}	—	January 5, 2000	Socorro	LINEAR	·	6.4 km	MPC · JPL
86398	2000 AV_{139}	—	January 5, 2000	Socorro	LINEAR	HYG	8.4 km	MPC · JPL
86399	2000 AV_{140}	—	January 5, 2000	Socorro	LINEAR	·	1.6 km	MPC · JPL
86400	2000 AE_{141}	—	January 5, 2000	Socorro	LINEAR	·	1.9 km	MPC · JPL

== 86401–86500 ==
back to top

Designation			Discovery			Properties		Ref
Permanent	Provisional	Named after	Date	Site	Discoverer(s)	Category	Diam.	Ref
86401	2000 AF_{143}	—	January 5, 2000	Socorro	LINEAR	·	4.2 km	MPC · JPL
86402	2000 AB_{144}	—	January 5, 2000	Socorro	LINEAR	H	2.0 km	MPC · JPL
86403	2000 AJ_{148}	—	January 6, 2000	Socorro	LINEAR	LUT	12 km	MPC · JPL
86404	2000 AG_{150}	—	January 7, 2000	Socorro	LINEAR	·	4.9 km	MPC · JPL
86405	2000 AN_{152}	—	January 8, 2000	Socorro	LINEAR	H	1.4 km	MPC · JPL
86406	2000 AU_{152}	—	January 8, 2000	Socorro	LINEAR	·	2.2 km	MPC · JPL
86407	2000 AK_{169}	—	January 7, 2000	Socorro	LINEAR	·	8.1 km	MPC · JPL
86408	2000 AC_{185}	—	January 7, 2000	Socorro	LINEAR	·	1.4 km	MPC · JPL
86409	2000 AK_{186}	—	January 8, 2000	Socorro	LINEAR	LIX	8.7 km	MPC · JPL
86410	2000 AU_{192}	—	January 8, 2000	Socorro	LINEAR	·	6.6 km	MPC · JPL
86411	2000 AQ_{201}	—	January 9, 2000	Socorro	LINEAR	H	1.3 km	MPC · JPL
86412	2000 AW_{202}	—	January 10, 2000	Socorro	LINEAR	·	2.1 km	MPC · JPL
86413	2000 AN_{203}	—	January 10, 2000	Socorro	LINEAR	PHO	2.8 km	MPC · JPL
86414	2000 AK_{212}	—	January 5, 2000	Kitt Peak	Spacewatch	V	1.4 km	MPC · JPL
86415	2000 AW_{221}	—	January 8, 2000	Kitt Peak	Spacewatch	·	1.4 km	MPC · JPL
86416	2000 AP_{232}	—	January 4, 2000	Socorro	LINEAR	·	2.1 km	MPC · JPL
86417	2000 AM_{242}	—	January 7, 2000	Anderson Mesa	LONEOS	THB	7.9 km	MPC · JPL
86418	2000 AE_{244}	—	January 8, 2000	Socorro	LINEAR	·	4.6 km	MPC · JPL
86419	2000 AL_{245}	—	January 9, 2000	Socorro	LINEAR	H	1.7 km	MPC · JPL
86420	2000 BT_{2}	—	January 26, 2000	Socorro	LINEAR	H	1.8 km	MPC · JPL
86421	2000 BC_{3}	—	January 26, 2000	Višnjan Observatory	K. Korlević	·	1.7 km	MPC · JPL
86422	2000 BX_{13}	—	January 29, 2000	Kitt Peak	Spacewatch	V	1.3 km	MPC · JPL
86423	2000 BQ_{19}	—	January 26, 2000	Kitt Peak	Spacewatch	·	2.3 km	MPC · JPL
86424	2000 BU_{20}	—	January 28, 2000	Kitt Peak	Spacewatch	·	1.5 km	MPC · JPL
86425	2000 BQ_{22}	—	January 26, 2000	Višnjan Observatory	K. Korlević	·	1.6 km	MPC · JPL
86426	2000 BP_{23}	—	January 27, 2000	Socorro	LINEAR	·	3.7 km	MPC · JPL
86427	2000 BG_{25}	—	January 30, 2000	Socorro	LINEAR	·	2.0 km	MPC · JPL
86428	2000 BQ_{27}	—	January 30, 2000	Socorro	LINEAR	·	1.5 km	MPC · JPL
86429	2000 BJ_{29}	—	January 31, 2000	Socorro	LINEAR	·	11 km	MPC · JPL
86430	2000 BV_{31}	—	January 27, 2000	Kitt Peak	Spacewatch	V	1.7 km	MPC · JPL
86431	2000 BN_{50}	—	January 16, 2000	Kitt Peak	Spacewatch	·	1.6 km	MPC · JPL
86432	2000 BW_{51}	—	January 30, 2000	Catalina	CSS	·	1.3 km	MPC · JPL
86433	2000 CU_{2}	—	February 4, 2000	Rock Finder	W. K. Y. Yeung	·	2.0 km	MPC · JPL
86434	2000 CX_{7}	—	February 2, 2000	Socorro	LINEAR	·	1.7 km	MPC · JPL
86435	2000 CL_{9}	—	February 2, 2000	Socorro	LINEAR	HIL · 3:2	14 km	MPC · JPL
86436	2000 CU_{12}	—	February 2, 2000	Socorro	LINEAR	·	1.2 km	MPC · JPL
86437	2000 CJ_{13}	—	February 2, 2000	Socorro	LINEAR	·	3.2 km	MPC · JPL
86438	2000 CN_{16}	—	February 2, 2000	Socorro	LINEAR	fast	2.0 km	MPC · JPL
86439	2000 CW_{18}	—	February 2, 2000	Socorro	LINEAR	·	2.5 km	MPC · JPL
86440	2000 CK_{21}	—	February 2, 2000	Socorro	LINEAR	·	3.4 km	MPC · JPL
86441	2000 CR_{22}	—	February 2, 2000	Socorro	LINEAR	·	1.7 km	MPC · JPL
86442	2000 CY_{24}	—	February 2, 2000	Socorro	LINEAR	·	1.7 km	MPC · JPL
86443	2000 CG_{27}	—	February 2, 2000	Socorro	LINEAR	·	1.7 km	MPC · JPL
86444	2000 CQ_{28}	—	February 2, 2000	Socorro	LINEAR	V	1.7 km	MPC · JPL
86445	2000 CW_{28}	—	February 2, 2000	Socorro	LINEAR	·	1.5 km	MPC · JPL
86446	2000 CS_{31}	—	February 2, 2000	Socorro	LINEAR	·	2.1 km	MPC · JPL
86447	2000 CE_{32}	—	February 2, 2000	Socorro	LINEAR	·	2.4 km	MPC · JPL
86448	2000 CU_{32}	—	February 2, 2000	Socorro	LINEAR	·	1.4 km	MPC · JPL
86449	2000 CD_{33}	—	February 2, 2000	Socorro	LINEAR	(2076)	1.4 km	MPC · JPL
86450	2000 CK_{33}	—	February 2, 2000	Socorro	LINEAR	ATE	730 m	MPC · JPL
86451	2000 CY_{34}	—	February 2, 2000	Socorro	LINEAR	(2076)	1.5 km	MPC · JPL
86452	2000 CQ_{35}	—	February 2, 2000	Socorro	LINEAR	·	1.9 km	MPC · JPL
86453	2000 CH_{39}	—	February 4, 2000	Socorro	LINEAR	·	1.7 km	MPC · JPL
86454	2000 CM_{40}	—	February 5, 2000	Socorro	LINEAR	PHO	2.6 km	MPC · JPL
86455	2000 CF_{41}	—	February 6, 2000	Prescott	P. G. Comba	·	2.7 km	MPC · JPL
86456	2000 CM_{41}	—	February 2, 2000	Socorro	LINEAR	·	1.8 km	MPC · JPL
86457	2000 CC_{43}	—	February 2, 2000	Socorro	LINEAR	·	1.7 km	MPC · JPL
86458	2000 CB_{47}	—	February 2, 2000	Socorro	LINEAR	V	1.1 km	MPC · JPL
86459	2000 CS_{49}	—	February 2, 2000	Socorro	LINEAR	·	1.8 km	MPC · JPL
86460	2000 CC_{52}	—	February 2, 2000	Socorro	LINEAR	·	2.0 km	MPC · JPL
86461	2000 CN_{52}	—	February 2, 2000	Socorro	LINEAR	·	2.2 km	MPC · JPL
86462	2000 CL_{56}	—	February 4, 2000	Socorro	LINEAR	·	2.0 km	MPC · JPL
86463	2000 CV_{57}	—	February 5, 2000	Socorro	LINEAR	V	1.4 km	MPC · JPL
86464	2000 CU_{62}	—	February 2, 2000	Socorro	LINEAR	·	2.1 km	MPC · JPL
86465	2000 CU_{63}	—	February 2, 2000	Socorro	LINEAR	·	2.1 km	MPC · JPL
86466	2000 CS_{66}	—	February 6, 2000	Socorro	LINEAR	·	2.6 km	MPC · JPL
86467	2000 CB_{70}	—	February 2, 2000	Socorro	LINEAR	fast	2.7 km	MPC · JPL
86468	2000 CR_{70}	—	February 7, 2000	Socorro	LINEAR	·	2.0 km	MPC · JPL
86469	2000 CV_{70}	—	February 7, 2000	Socorro	LINEAR	·	2.1 km	MPC · JPL
86470	2000 CV_{76}	—	February 10, 2000	Višnjan Observatory	K. Korlević	NYS	1.6 km	MPC · JPL
86471	2000 CX_{76}	—	February 10, 2000	Višnjan Observatory	K. Korlević	·	1.9 km	MPC · JPL
86472	2000 CZ_{76}	—	February 10, 2000	Višnjan Observatory	K. Korlević	·	2.7 km	MPC · JPL
86473	2000 CF_{79}	—	February 8, 2000	Kitt Peak	Spacewatch	NYS	1.6 km	MPC · JPL
86474	2000 CT_{79}	—	February 8, 2000	Kitt Peak	Spacewatch	AGN	2.9 km	MPC · JPL
86475	2000 CJ_{80}	—	February 4, 2000	Socorro	LINEAR	·	2.2 km	MPC · JPL
86476	2000 CT_{82}	—	February 4, 2000	Socorro	LINEAR	MAS	1.4 km	MPC · JPL
86477	2000 CU_{85}	—	February 4, 2000	Socorro	LINEAR	·	3.2 km	MPC · JPL
86478	2000 CL_{87}	—	February 4, 2000	Socorro	LINEAR	V	1.9 km	MPC · JPL
86479	2000 CG_{90}	—	February 6, 2000	Socorro	LINEAR	·	2.4 km	MPC · JPL
86480	2000 CT_{97}	—	February 9, 2000	Siding Spring	R. H. McNaught	·	1.7 km	MPC · JPL
86481	2000 CX_{102}	—	February 4, 2000	Socorro	LINEAR	NYS	1.6 km	MPC · JPL
86482	2000 CJ_{104}	—	February 7, 2000	Xinglong	SCAP	·	1.4 km	MPC · JPL
86483	2000 CT_{111}	—	February 6, 2000	Catalina	CSS	NYS	1.4 km	MPC · JPL
86484	2000 CD_{120}	—	February 2, 2000	Socorro	LINEAR	·	1.9 km	MPC · JPL
86485	2000 CF_{126}	—	February 3, 2000	Socorro	LINEAR	·	1.4 km	MPC · JPL
86486	2000 CE_{135}	—	February 4, 2000	Kitt Peak	Spacewatch	·	1.1 km	MPC · JPL
86487	2000 CQ_{144}	—	February 6, 2000	Kitt Peak	Spacewatch	·	1.7 km	MPC · JPL
86488	2000 DQ_{5}	—	February 25, 2000	Socorro	LINEAR	NYS	2.1 km	MPC · JPL
86489	2000 DU_{9}	—	February 26, 2000	Kitt Peak	Spacewatch	·	1.7 km	MPC · JPL
86490	2000 DA_{15}	—	February 26, 2000	Catalina	CSS	·	2.5 km	MPC · JPL
86491	2000 DL_{15}	—	February 26, 2000	Catalina	CSS	·	6.2 km	MPC · JPL
86492	2000 DN_{15}	—	February 26, 2000	Catalina	CSS	V	1.5 km	MPC · JPL
86493	2000 DD_{17}	—	February 29, 2000	Socorro	LINEAR	·	2.4 km	MPC · JPL
86494	2000 DT_{19}	—	February 29, 2000	Socorro	LINEAR	ERI	3.4 km	MPC · JPL
86495	2000 DT_{21}	—	February 29, 2000	Socorro	LINEAR	·	1.9 km	MPC · JPL
86496	2000 DC_{29}	—	February 29, 2000	Socorro	LINEAR	·	1.7 km	MPC · JPL
86497	2000 DO_{29}	—	February 29, 2000	Socorro	LINEAR	·	1.0 km	MPC · JPL
86498	2000 DQ_{29}	—	February 29, 2000	Socorro	LINEAR	V	1.5 km	MPC · JPL
86499	2000 DZ_{30}	—	February 29, 2000	Socorro	LINEAR	NYS	1.7 km	MPC · JPL
86500	2000 DR_{32}	—	February 29, 2000	Socorro	LINEAR	·	1.6 km	MPC · JPL

== 86501–86600 ==
back to top

Designation			Discovery			Properties		Ref
Permanent	Provisional	Named after	Date	Site	Discoverer(s)	Category	Diam.	Ref
86501	2000 DR_{35}	—	February 29, 2000	Socorro	LINEAR	·	4.1 km	MPC · JPL
86502	2000 DO_{38}	—	February 29, 2000	Socorro	LINEAR	·	1.9 km	MPC · JPL
86503	2000 DQ_{39}	—	February 29, 2000	Socorro	LINEAR	·	5.0 km	MPC · JPL
86504	2000 DG_{41}	—	February 29, 2000	Socorro	LINEAR	·	1.9 km	MPC · JPL
86505	2000 DS_{42}	—	February 29, 2000	Socorro	LINEAR	·	1.5 km	MPC · JPL
86506	2000 DR_{43}	—	February 29, 2000	Socorro	LINEAR	slow	1.4 km	MPC · JPL
86507	2000 DQ_{44}	—	February 29, 2000	Socorro	LINEAR	·	1.3 km	MPC · JPL
86508	2000 DU_{44}	—	February 29, 2000	Socorro	LINEAR	·	2.2 km	MPC · JPL
86509	2000 DJ_{47}	—	February 29, 2000	Socorro	LINEAR	·	1.8 km	MPC · JPL
86510	2000 DE_{53}	—	February 29, 2000	Socorro	LINEAR	·	2.1 km	MPC · JPL
86511	2000 DB_{54}	—	February 29, 2000	Socorro	LINEAR	·	3.5 km	MPC · JPL
86512	2000 DN_{58}	—	February 29, 2000	Socorro	LINEAR	·	1.6 km	MPC · JPL
86513	2000 DU_{61}	—	February 29, 2000	Socorro	LINEAR	·	2.2 km	MPC · JPL
86514	2000 DW_{63}	—	February 29, 2000	Socorro	LINEAR	·	2.2 km	MPC · JPL
86515	2000 DY_{64}	—	February 29, 2000	Socorro	LINEAR	·	1.5 km	MPC · JPL
86516	2000 DT_{67}	—	February 29, 2000	Socorro	LINEAR	V	1.4 km	MPC · JPL
86517	2000 DC_{68}	—	February 29, 2000	Socorro	LINEAR	·	1.6 km	MPC · JPL
86518	2000 DL_{68}	—	February 29, 2000	Socorro	LINEAR	·	2.2 km	MPC · JPL
86519	2000 DM_{68}	—	February 29, 2000	Socorro	LINEAR	·	3.2 km	MPC · JPL
86520	2000 DH_{69}	—	February 29, 2000	Socorro	LINEAR	V	2.0 km	MPC · JPL
86521	2000 DP_{69}	—	February 29, 2000	Socorro	LINEAR	NYS	2.2 km	MPC · JPL
86522	2000 DA_{73}	—	February 29, 2000	Socorro	LINEAR	·	2.3 km	MPC · JPL
86523	2000 DC_{74}	—	February 29, 2000	Socorro	LINEAR	·	1.7 km	MPC · JPL
86524	2000 DK_{74}	—	February 29, 2000	Socorro	LINEAR	NYS	2.3 km	MPC · JPL
86525	2000 DD_{76}	—	February 29, 2000	Socorro	LINEAR	·	1.9 km	MPC · JPL
86526	2000 DG_{76}	—	February 29, 2000	Socorro	LINEAR	V	1.8 km	MPC · JPL
86527	2000 DH_{76}	—	February 29, 2000	Socorro	LINEAR	·	2.4 km	MPC · JPL
86528	2000 DC_{78}	—	February 29, 2000	Socorro	LINEAR	·	1.4 km	MPC · JPL
86529	2000 DN_{79}	—	February 28, 2000	Socorro	LINEAR	·	2.2 km	MPC · JPL
86530	2000 DA_{80}	—	February 28, 2000	Socorro	LINEAR	·	5.6 km	MPC · JPL
86531	2000 DU_{81}	—	February 28, 2000	Socorro	LINEAR	V	1.5 km	MPC · JPL
86532	2000 DO_{86}	—	February 29, 2000	Socorro	LINEAR	·	3.1 km	MPC · JPL
86533	2000 DQ_{98}	—	February 29, 2000	Socorro	LINEAR	·	2.6 km	MPC · JPL
86534	2000 DT_{98}	—	February 29, 2000	Socorro	LINEAR	·	1.8 km	MPC · JPL
86535	2000 DK_{99}	—	February 29, 2000	Socorro	LINEAR	·	2.3 km	MPC · JPL
86536	2000 DN_{100}	—	February 29, 2000	Socorro	LINEAR	·	2.1 km	MPC · JPL
86537	2000 DQ_{102}	—	February 29, 2000	Socorro	LINEAR	·	2.2 km	MPC · JPL
86538	2000 DR_{102}	—	February 29, 2000	Socorro	LINEAR	·	3.0 km	MPC · JPL
86539	2000 DQ_{103}	—	February 29, 2000	Socorro	LINEAR	·	1.8 km	MPC · JPL
86540	2000 DQ_{104}	—	February 29, 2000	Socorro	LINEAR	·	1.7 km	MPC · JPL
86541	2000 DJ_{105}	—	February 29, 2000	Socorro	LINEAR	·	2.4 km	MPC · JPL
86542	2000 DO_{105}	—	February 29, 2000	Socorro	LINEAR	·	2.0 km	MPC · JPL
86543	2000 DR_{106}	—	February 29, 2000	Socorro	LINEAR	·	1.6 km	MPC · JPL
86544	2000 DX_{106}	—	February 29, 2000	Socorro	LINEAR	·	2.2 km	MPC · JPL
86545	2000 DC_{109}	—	February 29, 2000	Socorro	LINEAR	·	1.1 km	MPC · JPL
86546	2000 DW_{111}	—	February 29, 2000	Socorro	LINEAR	·	1.6 km	MPC · JPL
86547	2000 DS_{115}	—	February 28, 2000	Kitt Peak	Spacewatch	·	1.6 km	MPC · JPL
86548	2000 DZ_{115}	—	February 27, 2000	Catalina	CSS	·	1.9 km	MPC · JPL
86549	2000 EG	—	March 2, 2000	Prescott	P. G. Comba	·	1.6 km	MPC · JPL
86550	2000 EA_{3}	—	March 3, 2000	Socorro	LINEAR	·	1.8 km	MPC · JPL
86551 Seth	2000 EE_{4}	Seth	March 4, 2000	Lake Tekapo	Brady, N.	·	2.2 km	MPC · JPL
86552	2000 EY_{6}	—	March 2, 2000	Kitt Peak	Spacewatch	·	1.4 km	MPC · JPL
86553	2000 ER_{8}	—	March 3, 2000	Socorro	LINEAR	·	2.1 km	MPC · JPL
86554	2000 EH_{9}	—	March 3, 2000	Socorro	LINEAR	·	1.6 km	MPC · JPL
86555	2000 EB_{12}	—	March 4, 2000	Socorro	LINEAR	PHO	2.7 km	MPC · JPL
86556	2000 EN_{12}	—	March 4, 2000	Socorro	LINEAR	·	2.0 km	MPC · JPL
86557	2000 EC_{16}	—	March 3, 2000	Kitt Peak	Spacewatch	NYS	1.7 km	MPC · JPL
86558	2000 EQ_{16}	—	March 3, 2000	Socorro	LINEAR	·	1.8 km	MPC · JPL
86559	2000 EZ_{18}	—	March 13, 2000	Socorro	LINEAR	PHO	2.9 km	MPC · JPL
86560	2000 EQ_{19}	—	March 5, 2000	Socorro	LINEAR	V	1.4 km	MPC · JPL
86561	2000 EM_{25}	—	March 8, 2000	Kitt Peak	Spacewatch	·	1.7 km	MPC · JPL
86562	2000 EP_{25}	—	March 8, 2000	Kitt Peak	Spacewatch	·	2.4 km	MPC · JPL
86563	2000 EP_{28}	—	March 4, 2000	Socorro	LINEAR	·	1.6 km	MPC · JPL
86564	2000 EU_{28}	—	March 4, 2000	Socorro	LINEAR	PHO	1.7 km	MPC · JPL
86565	2000 EW_{30}	—	March 5, 2000	Socorro	LINEAR	fast	2.0 km	MPC · JPL
86566	2000 EY_{31}	—	March 5, 2000	Socorro	LINEAR	·	2.3 km	MPC · JPL
86567	2000 EB_{32}	—	March 5, 2000	Socorro	LINEAR	·	2.8 km	MPC · JPL
86568	2000 EU_{32}	—	March 5, 2000	Socorro	LINEAR	NYS	2.7 km	MPC · JPL
86569	2000 EN_{36}	—	March 5, 2000	Socorro	LINEAR	·	5.2 km	MPC · JPL
86570	2000 EH_{38}	—	March 8, 2000	Socorro	LINEAR	(2076)	1.7 km	MPC · JPL
86571	2000 EU_{38}	—	March 8, 2000	Socorro	LINEAR	NYS	3.0 km	MPC · JPL
86572	2000 ET_{39}	—	March 8, 2000	Socorro	LINEAR	·	2.2 km	MPC · JPL
86573	2000 EB_{42}	—	March 8, 2000	Socorro	LINEAR	NYS	1.8 km	MPC · JPL
86574	2000 EY_{42}	—	March 8, 2000	Socorro	LINEAR	NYS ·	4.6 km	MPC · JPL
86575	2000 EF_{43}	—	March 8, 2000	Socorro	LINEAR	MAS	1.3 km	MPC · JPL
86576	2000 EZ_{45}	—	March 9, 2000	Socorro	LINEAR	NYS	2.1 km	MPC · JPL
86577	2000 EJ_{46}	—	March 9, 2000	Socorro	LINEAR	V	1.5 km	MPC · JPL
86578	2000 EE_{48}	—	March 9, 2000	Socorro	LINEAR	·	1.6 km	MPC · JPL
86579	2000 ER_{48}	—	March 9, 2000	Socorro	LINEAR	·	1.8 km	MPC · JPL
86580	2000 EV_{48}	—	March 9, 2000	Socorro	LINEAR	·	2.7 km	MPC · JPL
86581	2000 EW_{54}	—	March 10, 2000	Kitt Peak	Spacewatch	·	3.8 km	MPC · JPL
86582	2000 ED_{56}	—	March 8, 2000	Socorro	LINEAR	·	2.6 km	MPC · JPL
86583	2000 EJ_{57}	—	March 8, 2000	Socorro	LINEAR	·	2.6 km	MPC · JPL
86584	2000 ES_{57}	—	March 8, 2000	Socorro	LINEAR	·	1.7 km	MPC · JPL
86585	2000 EX_{57}	—	March 8, 2000	Socorro	LINEAR	PHO	1.5 km	MPC · JPL
86586	2000 EQ_{58}	—	March 8, 2000	Socorro	LINEAR	NYS	2.2 km	MPC · JPL
86587	2000 ES_{60}	—	March 10, 2000	Socorro	LINEAR	·	1.3 km	MPC · JPL
86588	2000 EG_{61}	—	March 10, 2000	Socorro	LINEAR	NYS	2.1 km	MPC · JPL
86589	2000 EP_{62}	—	March 10, 2000	Socorro	LINEAR	·	1.7 km	MPC · JPL
86590	2000 EQ_{62}	—	March 10, 2000	Socorro	LINEAR	MAS	1.4 km	MPC · JPL
86591	2000 EP_{63}	—	March 10, 2000	Socorro	LINEAR	·	3.3 km	MPC · JPL
86592	2000 EW_{64}	—	March 10, 2000	Socorro	LINEAR	·	1.2 km	MPC · JPL
86593	2000 EX_{64}	—	March 10, 2000	Socorro	LINEAR	·	1.7 km	MPC · JPL
86594	2000 EH_{65}	—	March 10, 2000	Socorro	LINEAR	·	2.1 km	MPC · JPL
86595	2000 EW_{65}	—	March 10, 2000	Socorro	LINEAR	·	1.4 km	MPC · JPL
86596	2000 EO_{67}	—	March 10, 2000	Socorro	LINEAR	·	2.2 km	MPC · JPL
86597	2000 EG_{68}	—	March 10, 2000	Socorro	LINEAR	·	1.9 km	MPC · JPL
86598	2000 EQ_{69}	—	March 10, 2000	Socorro	LINEAR	·	3.0 km	MPC · JPL
86599	2000 EM_{70}	—	March 10, 2000	Socorro	LINEAR	·	2.2 km	MPC · JPL
86600	2000 EW_{74}	—	March 11, 2000	Kitt Peak	Spacewatch	·	1.6 km	MPC · JPL

== 86601–86700 ==
back to top

Designation			Discovery			Properties		Ref
Permanent	Provisional	Named after	Date	Site	Discoverer(s)	Category	Diam.	Ref
86601	2000 EU_{75}	—	March 5, 2000	Socorro	LINEAR	·	1.9 km	MPC · JPL
86602	2000 EN_{76}	—	March 5, 2000	Socorro	LINEAR	V	1.7 km	MPC · JPL
86603	2000 EX_{77}	—	March 5, 2000	Socorro	LINEAR	NYS	1.7 km	MPC · JPL
86604	2000 EM_{78}	—	March 5, 2000	Socorro	LINEAR	NYS	2.0 km	MPC · JPL
86605	2000 ES_{81}	—	March 5, 2000	Socorro	LINEAR	·	4.4 km	MPC · JPL
86606	2000 EB_{84}	—	March 5, 2000	Socorro	LINEAR	NYS	2.2 km	MPC · JPL
86607	2000 ET_{84}	—	March 8, 2000	Socorro	LINEAR	·	1.5 km	MPC · JPL
86608	2000 EK_{85}	—	March 8, 2000	Socorro	LINEAR	·	2.1 km	MPC · JPL
86609	2000 EP_{90}	—	March 9, 2000	Socorro	LINEAR	ERI	3.6 km	MPC · JPL
86610	2000 EB_{92}	—	March 9, 2000	Socorro	LINEAR	·	2.0 km	MPC · JPL
86611	2000 EE_{92}	—	March 9, 2000	Socorro	LINEAR	·	2.6 km	MPC · JPL
86612	2000 EY_{97}	—	March 12, 2000	Socorro	LINEAR	H	2.2 km	MPC · JPL
86613	2000 EW_{98}	—	March 10, 2000	Kitt Peak	Spacewatch	·	2.3 km	MPC · JPL
86614	2000 EA_{103}	—	March 9, 2000	Socorro	LINEAR	slow	3.2 km	MPC · JPL
86615	2000 EJ_{109}	—	March 8, 2000	Haleakala	NEAT	·	1.6 km	MPC · JPL
86616	2000 EP_{110}	—	March 8, 2000	Haleakala	NEAT	NYS	2.2 km	MPC · JPL
86617	2000 EY_{113}	—	March 9, 2000	Socorro	LINEAR	·	3.7 km	MPC · JPL
86618	2000 EX_{116}	—	March 10, 2000	Socorro	LINEAR	NYS	1.7 km	MPC · JPL
86619	2000 EF_{120}	—	March 11, 2000	Anderson Mesa	LONEOS	·	2.0 km	MPC · JPL
86620	2000 EY_{120}	—	March 11, 2000	Anderson Mesa	LONEOS	V	1.6 km	MPC · JPL
86621	2000 EB_{121}	—	March 11, 2000	Anderson Mesa	LONEOS	·	1.3 km	MPC · JPL
86622	2000 EV_{121}	—	March 11, 2000	Catalina	CSS	PHO	1.9 km	MPC · JPL
86623	2000 EK_{122}	—	March 11, 2000	Anderson Mesa	LONEOS	·	2.2 km	MPC · JPL
86624	2000 EA_{123}	—	March 11, 2000	Catalina	CSS	PHO	3.3 km	MPC · JPL
86625	2000 EQ_{124}	—	March 11, 2000	Anderson Mesa	LONEOS	·	4.2 km	MPC · JPL
86626	2000 EV_{124}	—	March 11, 2000	Anderson Mesa	LONEOS	·	2.1 km	MPC · JPL
86627	2000 EJ_{126}	—	March 11, 2000	Anderson Mesa	LONEOS	·	2.3 km	MPC · JPL
86628	2000 ED_{127}	—	March 11, 2000	Anderson Mesa	LONEOS	·	5.2 km	MPC · JPL
86629	2000 EJ_{128}	—	March 11, 2000	Anderson Mesa	LONEOS	·	4.5 km	MPC · JPL
86630	2000 EL_{132}	—	March 11, 2000	Socorro	LINEAR	·	2.7 km	MPC · JPL
86631	2000 EM_{132}	—	March 11, 2000	Socorro	LINEAR	NYS	2.4 km	MPC · JPL
86632	2000 ES_{132}	—	March 11, 2000	Socorro	LINEAR	·	3.4 km	MPC · JPL
86633	2000 EY_{132}	—	March 11, 2000	Socorro	LINEAR	MAS	1.6 km	MPC · JPL
86634	2000 ED_{133}	—	March 11, 2000	Socorro	LINEAR	·	2.2 km	MPC · JPL
86635	2000 EE_{133}	—	March 11, 2000	Socorro	LINEAR	·	2.4 km	MPC · JPL
86636	2000 ER_{133}	—	March 11, 2000	Anderson Mesa	LONEOS	slow	2.7 km	MPC · JPL
86637	2000 EO_{134}	—	March 11, 2000	Anderson Mesa	LONEOS	V	1.7 km	MPC · JPL
86638	2000 EQ_{134}	—	March 11, 2000	Anderson Mesa	LONEOS	NYS	2.8 km	MPC · JPL
86639	2000 EA_{135}	—	March 11, 2000	Anderson Mesa	LONEOS	V	1.5 km	MPC · JPL
86640	2000 EN_{135}	—	March 11, 2000	Anderson Mesa	LONEOS	·	4.1 km	MPC · JPL
86641	2000 EA_{136}	—	March 11, 2000	Socorro	LINEAR	ERI	3.7 km	MPC · JPL
86642	2000 EH_{140}	—	March 1, 2000	Catalina	CSS	·	3.9 km	MPC · JPL
86643	2000 ES_{141}	—	March 2, 2000	Catalina	CSS	·	2.4 km	MPC · JPL
86644	2000 EB_{145}	—	March 3, 2000	Catalina	CSS	·	3.0 km	MPC · JPL
86645	2000 ES_{145}	—	March 3, 2000	Socorro	LINEAR	NYS	2.2 km	MPC · JPL
86646	2000 EG_{147}	—	March 4, 2000	Catalina	CSS	·	2.8 km	MPC · JPL
86647	2000 EQ_{150}	—	March 5, 2000	Haleakala	NEAT	·	2.2 km	MPC · JPL
86648	2000 EG_{152}	—	March 6, 2000	Haleakala	NEAT	V	1.6 km	MPC · JPL
86649	2000 EM_{152}	—	March 6, 2000	Haleakala	NEAT	·	2.5 km	MPC · JPL
86650	2000 EW_{153}	—	March 6, 2000	Haleakala	NEAT	·	1.4 km	MPC · JPL
86651	2000 EC_{154}	—	March 6, 2000	Haleakala	NEAT	·	1.9 km	MPC · JPL
86652	2000 EY_{158}	—	March 12, 2000	Anderson Mesa	LONEOS	·	5.1 km	MPC · JPL
86653	2000 EY_{170}	—	March 5, 2000	Socorro	LINEAR	V	1.4 km	MPC · JPL
86654	2000 ED_{172}	—	March 10, 2000	Socorro	LINEAR	·	2.0 km	MPC · JPL
86655	2000 ET_{183}	—	March 5, 2000	Socorro	LINEAR	·	2.1 km	MPC · JPL
86656	2000 EH_{184}	—	March 5, 2000	Socorro	LINEAR	·	1.9 km	MPC · JPL
86657	2000 EG_{185}	—	March 5, 2000	Haleakala	NEAT	NYS	2.3 km	MPC · JPL
86658	2000 EQ_{185}	—	March 5, 2000	Haleakala	NEAT	·	2.4 km	MPC · JPL
86659	2000 ER_{185}	—	March 1, 2000	Kitt Peak	Spacewatch	(5)	2.3 km	MPC · JPL
86660	2000 EH_{200}	—	March 1, 2000	Catalina	CSS	·	1.9 km	MPC · JPL
86661	2000 FG_{3}	—	March 28, 2000	Socorro	LINEAR	·	1.8 km	MPC · JPL
86662	2000 FA_{6}	—	March 25, 2000	Kitt Peak	Spacewatch	·	1.6 km	MPC · JPL
86663	2000 FS_{6}	—	March 27, 2000	Kitt Peak	Spacewatch	·	1.7 km	MPC · JPL
86664	2000 FS_{9}	—	March 30, 2000	Kitt Peak	Spacewatch	MAS	1.5 km	MPC · JPL
86665	2000 FD_{10}	—	March 30, 2000	Kitt Peak	Spacewatch	·	1.5 km	MPC · JPL
86666	2000 FL_{10}	—	March 30, 2000	Catalina	CSS	APO +1km · slow	1.2 km	MPC · JPL
86667	2000 FO_{10}	—	March 30, 2000	Socorro	LINEAR	ATE +1km	740 m	MPC · JPL
86668	2000 FZ_{10}	—	March 30, 2000	Socorro	LINEAR	(194)	5.1 km	MPC · JPL
86669	2000 FV_{14}	—	March 29, 2000	Socorro	LINEAR	·	2.5 km	MPC · JPL
86670	2000 FN_{15}	—	March 28, 2000	Socorro	LINEAR	·	2.3 km	MPC · JPL
86671	2000 FA_{19}	—	March 29, 2000	Socorro	LINEAR	·	2.3 km	MPC · JPL
86672	2000 FV_{19}	—	March 29, 2000	Socorro	LINEAR	V	1.4 km	MPC · JPL
86673	2000 FB_{23}	—	March 29, 2000	Socorro	LINEAR	·	1.9 km	MPC · JPL
86674	2000 FK_{23}	—	March 29, 2000	Socorro	LINEAR	·	4.1 km	MPC · JPL
86675	2000 FP_{25}	—	March 27, 2000	Anderson Mesa	LONEOS	·	4.0 km	MPC · JPL
86676	2000 FY_{28}	—	March 27, 2000	Anderson Mesa	LONEOS	·	3.2 km	MPC · JPL
86677	2000 FA_{29}	—	March 27, 2000	Anderson Mesa	LONEOS	·	2.0 km	MPC · JPL
86678	2000 FK_{29}	—	March 27, 2000	Anderson Mesa	LONEOS	NYS	3.6 km	MPC · JPL
86679	2000 FR_{30}	—	March 27, 2000	Anderson Mesa	LONEOS	·	2.4 km	MPC · JPL
86680	2000 FG_{31}	—	March 28, 2000	Socorro	LINEAR	·	4.6 km	MPC · JPL
86681	2000 FK_{33}	—	March 29, 2000	Socorro	LINEAR	V	1.5 km	MPC · JPL
86682	2000 FB_{35}	—	March 29, 2000	Socorro	LINEAR	·	1.5 km	MPC · JPL
86683	2000 FF_{35}	—	March 29, 2000	Socorro	LINEAR	NYS	2.3 km	MPC · JPL
86684	2000 FH_{38}	—	March 29, 2000	Socorro	LINEAR	·	2.6 km	MPC · JPL
86685	2000 FO_{39}	—	March 29, 2000	Socorro	LINEAR	·	2.1 km	MPC · JPL
86686	2000 FU_{39}	—	March 29, 2000	Socorro	LINEAR	·	1.9 km	MPC · JPL
86687	2000 FH_{41}	—	March 29, 2000	Socorro	LINEAR	·	2.6 km	MPC · JPL
86688	2000 FA_{44}	—	March 29, 2000	Socorro	LINEAR	·	2.7 km	MPC · JPL
86689	2000 FN_{45}	—	March 29, 2000	Socorro	LINEAR	V	1.4 km	MPC · JPL
86690	2000 FS_{45}	—	March 29, 2000	Socorro	LINEAR	·	1.5 km	MPC · JPL
86691	2000 FE_{46}	—	March 29, 2000	Socorro	LINEAR	·	2.8 km	MPC · JPL
86692	2000 FS_{47}	—	March 29, 2000	Socorro	LINEAR	V	1.4 km	MPC · JPL
86693	2000 FR_{48}	—	March 30, 2000	Socorro	LINEAR	·	2.1 km	MPC · JPL
86694	2000 FC_{49}	—	March 30, 2000	Socorro	LINEAR	·	3.4 km	MPC · JPL
86695	2000 FF_{49}	—	March 30, 2000	Socorro	LINEAR	·	2.5 km	MPC · JPL
86696	2000 FO_{49}	—	March 30, 2000	Socorro	LINEAR	·	2.2 km	MPC · JPL
86697	2000 FY_{49}	—	March 30, 2000	Socorro	LINEAR	NYS	7.4 km	MPC · JPL
86698	2000 FJ_{55}	—	March 30, 2000	Catalina	CSS	BAP	2.0 km	MPC · JPL
86699	2000 FU_{55}	—	March 27, 2000	Anderson Mesa	LONEOS	PHO	2.8 km	MPC · JPL
86700	2000 FD_{58}	—	March 26, 2000	Anderson Mesa	LONEOS	·	3.8 km	MPC · JPL

== 86701–86800 ==
back to top

Designation			Discovery			Properties		Ref
Permanent	Provisional	Named after	Date	Site	Discoverer(s)	Category	Diam.	Ref
86701	2000 FP_{59}	—	March 29, 2000	Socorro	LINEAR	·	1.9 km	MPC · JPL
86702	2000 FM_{60}	—	March 29, 2000	Socorro	LINEAR	·	1.6 km	MPC · JPL
86703	2000 FC_{61}	—	March 29, 2000	Socorro	LINEAR	·	4.4 km	MPC · JPL
86704	2000 FS_{63}	—	March 29, 2000	Socorro	LINEAR	NYS	1.8 km	MPC · JPL
86705	2000 FW_{64}	—	March 30, 2000	Socorro	LINEAR	V	1.9 km	MPC · JPL
86706	2000 FY_{73}	—	March 29, 2000	Socorro	LINEAR	PHO	3.1 km	MPC · JPL
86707	2000 GJ	—	April 2, 2000	Prescott	P. G. Comba	NYS	1.7 km	MPC · JPL
86708	2000 GK_{5}	—	April 4, 2000	Socorro	LINEAR	·	1.4 km	MPC · JPL
86709	2000 GR_{5}	—	April 4, 2000	Socorro	LINEAR	·	1.9 km	MPC · JPL
86710	2000 GU_{5}	—	April 4, 2000	Socorro	LINEAR	NYS	2.4 km	MPC · JPL
86711	2000 GB_{6}	—	April 4, 2000	Socorro	LINEAR	NYS	1.7 km	MPC · JPL
86712	2000 GO_{6}	—	April 4, 2000	Socorro	LINEAR	MAS	1.1 km	MPC · JPL
86713	2000 GY_{8}	—	April 5, 2000	Socorro	LINEAR	·	1.8 km	MPC · JPL
86714	2000 GN_{9}	—	April 5, 2000	Socorro	LINEAR	·	2.8 km	MPC · JPL
86715	2000 GO_{9}	—	April 5, 2000	Socorro	LINEAR	·	2.0 km	MPC · JPL
86716	2000 GW_{10}	—	April 5, 2000	Socorro	LINEAR	·	1.8 km	MPC · JPL
86717	2000 GG_{11}	—	April 5, 2000	Socorro	LINEAR	·	2.2 km	MPC · JPL
86718	2000 GO_{14}	—	April 5, 2000	Socorro	LINEAR	·	1.3 km	MPC · JPL
86719	2000 GA_{19}	—	April 5, 2000	Socorro	LINEAR	NYS	1.9 km	MPC · JPL
86720	2000 GC_{19}	—	April 5, 2000	Socorro	LINEAR	·	1.8 km	MPC · JPL
86721	2000 GJ_{28}	—	April 5, 2000	Socorro	LINEAR	NYS	2.3 km	MPC · JPL
86722	2000 GY_{28}	—	April 5, 2000	Socorro	LINEAR	·	1.4 km	MPC · JPL
86723	2000 GG_{30}	—	April 5, 2000	Socorro	LINEAR	·	1.8 km	MPC · JPL
86724	2000 GY_{30}	—	April 5, 2000	Socorro	LINEAR	MAS	1.5 km	MPC · JPL
86725	2000 GG_{32}	—	April 5, 2000	Socorro	LINEAR	AST	4.2 km	MPC · JPL
86726	2000 GN_{34}	—	April 5, 2000	Socorro	LINEAR	·	2.1 km	MPC · JPL
86727	2000 GW_{34}	—	April 5, 2000	Socorro	LINEAR	·	1.4 km	MPC · JPL
86728	2000 GV_{35}	—	April 5, 2000	Socorro	LINEAR	·	1.8 km	MPC · JPL
86729	2000 GX_{36}	—	April 5, 2000	Socorro	LINEAR	NYS ·	3.7 km	MPC · JPL
86730	2000 GY_{37}	—	April 5, 2000	Socorro	LINEAR	·	1.4 km	MPC · JPL
86731	2000 GV_{38}	—	April 5, 2000	Socorro	LINEAR	·	2.8 km	MPC · JPL
86732	2000 GK_{39}	—	April 5, 2000	Socorro	LINEAR	·	1.8 km	MPC · JPL
86733	2000 GS_{41}	—	April 5, 2000	Socorro	LINEAR	·	2.2 km	MPC · JPL
86734	2000 GT_{42}	—	April 5, 2000	Socorro	LINEAR	·	1.5 km	MPC · JPL
86735	2000 GF_{43}	—	April 5, 2000	Socorro	LINEAR	MAS	1.3 km	MPC · JPL
86736	2000 GE_{45}	—	April 5, 2000	Socorro	LINEAR	NYS	2.6 km	MPC · JPL
86737	2000 GV_{46}	—	April 5, 2000	Socorro	LINEAR	NYS	2.4 km	MPC · JPL
86738	2000 GB_{51}	—	April 5, 2000	Socorro	LINEAR	·	1.4 km	MPC · JPL
86739	2000 GC_{51}	—	April 5, 2000	Socorro	LINEAR	·	1.8 km	MPC · JPL
86740	2000 GM_{51}	—	April 5, 2000	Socorro	LINEAR	·	3.4 km	MPC · JPL
86741	2000 GW_{52}	—	April 5, 2000	Socorro	LINEAR	·	2.1 km	MPC · JPL
86742	2000 GR_{53}	—	April 5, 2000	Socorro	LINEAR	MAS	1.8 km	MPC · JPL
86743	2000 GS_{56}	—	April 5, 2000	Socorro	LINEAR	·	2.2 km	MPC · JPL
86744	2000 GE_{57}	—	April 5, 2000	Socorro	LINEAR	·	2.7 km	MPC · JPL
86745	2000 GJ_{57}	—	April 5, 2000	Socorro	LINEAR	·	2.6 km	MPC · JPL
86746	2000 GW_{57}	—	April 5, 2000	Socorro	LINEAR	NYS	1.8 km	MPC · JPL
86747	2000 GZ_{57}	—	April 5, 2000	Socorro	LINEAR	NYS	2.7 km	MPC · JPL
86748	2000 GP_{58}	—	April 5, 2000	Socorro	LINEAR	·	2.4 km	MPC · JPL
86749	2000 GF_{60}	—	April 5, 2000	Socorro	LINEAR	slow	1.5 km	MPC · JPL
86750	2000 GS_{63}	—	April 5, 2000	Socorro	LINEAR	·	1.5 km	MPC · JPL
86751	2000 GQ_{64}	—	April 5, 2000	Socorro	LINEAR	·	2.6 km	MPC · JPL
86752	2000 GB_{66}	—	April 5, 2000	Socorro	LINEAR	MAS	1.5 km	MPC · JPL
86753	2000 GK_{67}	—	April 5, 2000	Socorro	LINEAR	NYS	1.8 km	MPC · JPL
86754	2000 GS_{67}	—	April 5, 2000	Socorro	LINEAR	·	1.6 km	MPC · JPL
86755	2000 GO_{68}	—	April 5, 2000	Socorro	LINEAR	·	1.3 km	MPC · JPL
86756	2000 GV_{69}	—	April 5, 2000	Socorro	LINEAR	V	1.9 km	MPC · JPL
86757	2000 GA_{70}	—	April 5, 2000	Socorro	LINEAR	ERI	3.8 km	MPC · JPL
86758	2000 GV_{71}	—	April 5, 2000	Socorro	LINEAR	·	2.1 km	MPC · JPL
86759	2000 GX_{72}	—	April 5, 2000	Socorro	LINEAR	NYS	2.6 km	MPC · JPL
86760	2000 GQ_{75}	—	April 5, 2000	Socorro	LINEAR	·	2.1 km	MPC · JPL
86761	2000 GR_{75}	—	April 5, 2000	Socorro	LINEAR	·	2.0 km	MPC · JPL
86762	2000 GS_{75}	—	April 5, 2000	Socorro	LINEAR	·	1.4 km	MPC · JPL
86763	2000 GH_{78}	—	April 5, 2000	Socorro	LINEAR	·	1.9 km	MPC · JPL
86764	2000 GP_{78}	—	April 5, 2000	Socorro	LINEAR	·	1.3 km	MPC · JPL
86765	2000 GC_{84}	—	April 3, 2000	Socorro	LINEAR	V	1.6 km	MPC · JPL
86766	2000 GD_{84}	—	April 3, 2000	Socorro	LINEAR	·	1.9 km	MPC · JPL
86767	2000 GX_{84}	—	April 3, 2000	Socorro	LINEAR	PHO	1.9 km	MPC · JPL
86768	2000 GA_{86}	—	April 4, 2000	Socorro	LINEAR	·	3.0 km	MPC · JPL
86769	2000 GE_{87}	—	April 4, 2000	Socorro	LINEAR	·	3.4 km	MPC · JPL
86770	2000 GN_{87}	—	April 4, 2000	Socorro	LINEAR	(2076)	2.0 km	MPC · JPL
86771	2000 GS_{87}	—	April 4, 2000	Socorro	LINEAR	·	1.9 km	MPC · JPL
86772	2000 GK_{88}	—	April 4, 2000	Socorro	LINEAR	·	1.9 km	MPC · JPL
86773	2000 GT_{88}	—	April 4, 2000	Socorro	LINEAR	·	2.3 km	MPC · JPL
86774	2000 GH_{89}	—	April 4, 2000	Socorro	LINEAR	·	2.8 km	MPC · JPL
86775	2000 GL_{90}	—	April 4, 2000	Socorro	LINEAR	V	2.1 km	MPC · JPL
86776	2000 GR_{91}	—	April 4, 2000	Socorro	LINEAR	·	3.1 km	MPC · JPL
86777	2000 GV_{91}	—	April 4, 2000	Socorro	LINEAR	·	2.1 km	MPC · JPL
86778	2000 GX_{91}	—	April 4, 2000	Socorro	LINEAR	V	2.2 km	MPC · JPL
86779	2000 GG_{92}	—	April 4, 2000	Socorro	LINEAR	·	1.3 km	MPC · JPL
86780	2000 GO_{92}	—	April 5, 2000	Socorro	LINEAR	·	2.0 km	MPC · JPL
86781	2000 GT_{92}	—	April 5, 2000	Socorro	LINEAR	NYS	2.9 km	MPC · JPL
86782	2000 GZ_{92}	—	April 5, 2000	Socorro	LINEAR	·	1.6 km	MPC · JPL
86783	2000 GX_{93}	—	April 5, 2000	Socorro	LINEAR	PHO	1.8 km	MPC · JPL
86784	2000 GZ_{93}	—	April 5, 2000	Socorro	LINEAR	PHO	1.6 km	MPC · JPL
86785	2000 GW_{94}	—	April 6, 2000	Socorro	LINEAR	MAS	1.2 km	MPC · JPL
86786	2000 GS_{97}	—	April 7, 2000	Socorro	LINEAR	ERI · slow	2.8 km	MPC · JPL
86787	2000 GZ_{97}	—	April 7, 2000	Socorro	LINEAR	·	2.9 km	MPC · JPL
86788	2000 GX_{98}	—	April 7, 2000	Socorro	LINEAR	·	3.3 km	MPC · JPL
86789	2000 GD_{99}	—	April 7, 2000	Socorro	LINEAR	·	1.9 km	MPC · JPL
86790	2000 GE_{100}	—	April 7, 2000	Socorro	LINEAR	·	1.9 km	MPC · JPL
86791	2000 GN_{100}	—	April 7, 2000	Socorro	LINEAR	·	1.6 km	MPC · JPL
86792	2000 GM_{103}	—	April 7, 2000	Socorro	LINEAR	·	2.3 km	MPC · JPL
86793	2000 GF_{104}	—	April 7, 2000	Socorro	LINEAR	·	2.7 km	MPC · JPL
86794	2000 GL_{104}	—	April 7, 2000	Socorro	LINEAR	·	4.0 km	MPC · JPL
86795	2000 GM_{105}	—	April 7, 2000	Socorro	LINEAR	·	1.8 km	MPC · JPL
86796	2000 GY_{107}	—	April 7, 2000	Socorro	LINEAR	·	2.7 km	MPC · JPL
86797	2000 GM_{108}	—	April 7, 2000	Socorro	LINEAR	·	2.6 km	MPC · JPL
86798	2000 GW_{111}	—	April 3, 2000	Anderson Mesa	LONEOS	·	3.2 km	MPC · JPL
86799	2000 GH_{112}	—	April 3, 2000	Anderson Mesa	LONEOS	·	2.1 km	MPC · JPL
86800	2000 GG_{113}	—	April 6, 2000	Socorro	LINEAR	·	1.7 km	MPC · JPL

== 86801–86900 ==
back to top

Designation			Discovery			Properties		Ref
Permanent	Provisional	Named after	Date	Site	Discoverer(s)	Category	Diam.	Ref
86801	2000 GJ_{113}	—	April 6, 2000	Socorro	LINEAR	NYS	2.7 km	MPC · JPL
86802	2000 GY_{113}	—	April 7, 2000	Socorro	LINEAR	·	2.6 km	MPC · JPL
86803	2000 GZ_{114}	—	April 8, 2000	Socorro	LINEAR	V	1.5 km	MPC · JPL
86804	2000 GH_{115}	—	April 8, 2000	Socorro	LINEAR	V	1.9 km	MPC · JPL
86805	2000 GR_{115}	—	April 8, 2000	Socorro	LINEAR	·	1.4 km	MPC · JPL
86806	2000 GS_{115}	—	April 8, 2000	Socorro	LINEAR	NYS	3.6 km	MPC · JPL
86807	2000 GE_{116}	—	April 8, 2000	Socorro	LINEAR	NYS	2.7 km	MPC · JPL
86808	2000 GW_{116}	—	April 2, 2000	Kitt Peak	Spacewatch	·	1.9 km	MPC · JPL
86809	2000 GC_{124}	—	April 7, 2000	Socorro	LINEAR	·	2.9 km	MPC · JPL
86810	2000 GD_{124}	—	April 7, 2000	Socorro	LINEAR	·	1.9 km	MPC · JPL
86811	2000 GX_{124}	—	April 7, 2000	Socorro	LINEAR	·	2.8 km	MPC · JPL
86812	2000 GB_{125}	—	April 7, 2000	Socorro	LINEAR	·	4.9 km	MPC · JPL
86813	2000 GS_{131}	—	April 7, 2000	Kitt Peak	Spacewatch	·	1.6 km	MPC · JPL
86814	2000 GB_{133}	—	April 13, 2000	Prescott	P. G. Comba	·	2.1 km	MPC · JPL
86815	2000 GL_{134}	—	April 8, 2000	Socorro	LINEAR	·	3.4 km	MPC · JPL
86816	2000 GB_{135}	—	April 8, 2000	Socorro	LINEAR	·	2.1 km	MPC · JPL
86817	2000 GY_{135}	—	April 12, 2000	Socorro	LINEAR	·	1.4 km	MPC · JPL
86818	2000 GK_{136}	—	April 12, 2000	Socorro	LINEAR	·	3.1 km	MPC · JPL
86819	2000 GK_{137}	—	April 13, 2000	Socorro	LINEAR	APO +1km · PHA	800 m	MPC · JPL
86820	2000 GJ_{138}	—	April 4, 2000	Anderson Mesa	LONEOS	·	1.5 km	MPC · JPL
86821	2000 GV_{138}	—	April 4, 2000	Anderson Mesa	LONEOS	·	1.5 km	MPC · JPL
86822	2000 GY_{139}	—	April 4, 2000	Anderson Mesa	LONEOS	·	1.6 km	MPC · JPL
86823	2000 GO_{140}	—	April 4, 2000	Anderson Mesa	LONEOS	·	2.8 km	MPC · JPL
86824	2000 GS_{140}	—	April 4, 2000	Anderson Mesa	LONEOS	·	1.9 km	MPC · JPL
86825	2000 GM_{141}	—	April 7, 2000	Anderson Mesa	LONEOS	·	2.4 km	MPC · JPL
86826	2000 GG_{142}	—	April 7, 2000	Anderson Mesa	LONEOS	·	2.2 km	MPC · JPL
86827	2000 GN_{145}	—	April 10, 2000	Kitt Peak	Spacewatch	V	1.6 km	MPC · JPL
86828	2000 GR_{145}	—	April 11, 2000	Kitt Peak	Spacewatch	·	2.1 km	MPC · JPL
86829	2000 GR_{146}	—	April 12, 2000	Socorro	LINEAR	APO +1km	1.8 km	MPC · JPL
86830	2000 GN_{147}	—	April 2, 2000	Anderson Mesa	LONEOS	·	2.3 km	MPC · JPL
86831	2000 GT_{147}	—	April 2, 2000	Kitt Peak	Spacewatch	·	3.3 km	MPC · JPL
86832	2000 GU_{152}	—	April 6, 2000	Anderson Mesa	LONEOS	·	3.3 km	MPC · JPL
86833	2000 GZ_{153}	—	April 6, 2000	Anderson Mesa	LONEOS	·	3.3 km	MPC · JPL
86834	2000 GY_{156}	—	April 6, 2000	Kitt Peak	Spacewatch	fast	4.1 km	MPC · JPL
86835	2000 GJ_{158}	—	April 7, 2000	Anderson Mesa	LONEOS	·	1.6 km	MPC · JPL
86836	2000 GE_{160}	—	April 7, 2000	Socorro	LINEAR	·	1.2 km	MPC · JPL
86837	2000 GH_{160}	—	April 7, 2000	Socorro	LINEAR	·	1.7 km	MPC · JPL
86838	2000 GY_{161}	—	April 7, 2000	Anderson Mesa	LONEOS	·	2.6 km	MPC · JPL
86839	2000 GD_{162}	—	April 7, 2000	Anderson Mesa	LONEOS	·	1.9 km	MPC · JPL
86840	2000 GF_{162}	—	April 7, 2000	Socorro	LINEAR	V	1.8 km	MPC · JPL
86841	2000 GC_{163}	—	April 9, 2000	Anderson Mesa	LONEOS	PHO	2.4 km	MPC · JPL
86842	2000 GQ_{166}	—	April 5, 2000	Socorro	LINEAR	PHO	2.0 km	MPC · JPL
86843	2000 GM_{168}	—	April 4, 2000	Anderson Mesa	LONEOS	·	2.5 km	MPC · JPL
86844	2000 GW_{170}	—	April 5, 2000	Anderson Mesa	LONEOS	·	1.7 km	MPC · JPL
86845	2000 GP_{172}	—	April 2, 2000	Anderson Mesa	LONEOS	·	1.6 km	MPC · JPL
86846	2000 GC_{173}	—	April 3, 2000	Socorro	LINEAR	V	1.2 km	MPC · JPL
86847	2000 GV_{174}	—	April 3, 2000	Kitt Peak	Spacewatch	·	1.0 km	MPC · JPL
86848	2000 GL_{176}	—	April 2, 2000	Kitt Peak	Spacewatch	NYS	2.6 km	MPC · JPL
86849	2000 GY_{179}	—	April 5, 2000	Anderson Mesa	LONEOS	·	1.7 km	MPC · JPL
86850	2000 GA_{183}	—	April 2, 2000	Anderson Mesa	LONEOS	NYS	3.9 km	MPC · JPL
86851	2000 HK	—	April 24, 2000	Kitt Peak	Spacewatch	·	1.1 km	MPC · JPL
86852	2000 HJ_{2}	—	April 25, 2000	Kitt Peak	Spacewatch	·	3.0 km	MPC · JPL
86853	2000 HC_{5}	—	April 27, 2000	Socorro	LINEAR	·	2.9 km	MPC · JPL
86854	2000 HF_{5}	—	April 28, 2000	Socorro	LINEAR	PHO	2.2 km	MPC · JPL
86855	2000 HQ_{5}	—	April 24, 2000	Kitt Peak	Spacewatch	·	1.8 km	MPC · JPL
86856	2000 HE_{9}	—	April 27, 2000	Socorro	LINEAR	·	2.2 km	MPC · JPL
86857	2000 HW_{9}	—	April 27, 2000	Socorro	LINEAR	·	2.5 km	MPC · JPL
86858	2000 HS_{11}	—	April 28, 2000	Socorro	LINEAR	·	1.6 km	MPC · JPL
86859	2000 HU_{11}	—	April 28, 2000	Socorro	LINEAR	·	2.9 km	MPC · JPL
86860	2000 HX_{11}	—	April 28, 2000	Socorro	LINEAR	·	2.0 km	MPC · JPL
86861	2000 HA_{12}	—	April 28, 2000	Socorro	LINEAR	·	2.2 km	MPC · JPL
86862	2000 HU_{13}	—	April 28, 2000	Socorro	LINEAR	·	2.3 km	MPC · JPL
86863	2000 HY_{14}	—	April 27, 2000	Socorro	LINEAR	·	1.6 km	MPC · JPL
86864	2000 HH_{16}	—	April 29, 2000	Socorro	LINEAR	·	2.1 km	MPC · JPL
86865	2000 HV_{16}	—	April 24, 2000	Kitt Peak	Spacewatch	MAS · fast	1.4 km	MPC · JPL
86866	2000 HD_{18}	—	April 24, 2000	Kitt Peak	Spacewatch	·	2.7 km	MPC · JPL
86867	2000 HU_{18}	—	April 25, 2000	Kitt Peak	Spacewatch	V	2.0 km	MPC · JPL
86868	2000 HA_{20}	—	April 27, 2000	Kitt Peak	Spacewatch	·	1.9 km	MPC · JPL
86869	2000 HF_{20}	—	April 29, 2000	Kitt Peak	Spacewatch	·	1.4 km	MPC · JPL
86870	2000 HK_{20}	—	April 29, 2000	Kitt Peak	Spacewatch	V	1.1 km	MPC · JPL
86871	2000 HA_{21}	—	April 27, 2000	Socorro	LINEAR	NYS	2.0 km	MPC · JPL
86872	2000 HE_{21}	—	April 27, 2000	Socorro	LINEAR	·	1.9 km	MPC · JPL
86873	2000 HH_{21}	—	April 27, 2000	Socorro	LINEAR	·	2.0 km	MPC · JPL
86874	2000 HL_{21}	—	April 27, 2000	Socorro	LINEAR	·	1.8 km	MPC · JPL
86875	2000 HN_{21}	—	April 28, 2000	Socorro	LINEAR	V	1.7 km	MPC · JPL
86876	2000 HZ_{21}	—	April 29, 2000	Socorro	LINEAR	·	2.4 km	MPC · JPL
86877	2000 HG_{22}	—	April 29, 2000	Socorro	LINEAR	·	2.2 km	MPC · JPL
86878	2000 HD_{24}	—	April 30, 2000	Haleakala	NEAT	APO +1km	1.0 km	MPC · JPL
86879	2000 HS_{25}	—	April 24, 2000	Anderson Mesa	LONEOS	NYS	2.3 km	MPC · JPL
86880	2000 HE_{26}	—	April 24, 2000	Anderson Mesa	LONEOS	·	2.3 km	MPC · JPL
86881	2000 HD_{27}	—	April 27, 2000	Socorro	LINEAR	·	2.1 km	MPC · JPL
86882	2000 HE_{27}	—	April 27, 2000	Socorro	LINEAR	·	2.5 km	MPC · JPL
86883	2000 HH_{27}	—	April 27, 2000	Socorro	LINEAR	·	5.6 km	MPC · JPL
86884	2000 HJ_{27}	—	April 27, 2000	Socorro	LINEAR	·	3.5 km	MPC · JPL
86885	2000 HU_{27}	—	April 28, 2000	Socorro	LINEAR	PHO	3.5 km	MPC · JPL
86886	2000 HR_{29}	—	April 28, 2000	Socorro	LINEAR	·	3.4 km	MPC · JPL
86887	2000 HV_{29}	—	April 28, 2000	Socorro	LINEAR	V	1.4 km	MPC · JPL
86888	2000 HB_{30}	—	April 28, 2000	Socorro	LINEAR	·	2.7 km	MPC · JPL
86889	2000 HF_{30}	—	April 28, 2000	Socorro	LINEAR	·	2.7 km	MPC · JPL
86890	2000 HN_{31}	—	April 29, 2000	Socorro	LINEAR	·	1.8 km	MPC · JPL
86891	2000 HK_{32}	—	April 29, 2000	Socorro	LINEAR	·	2.0 km	MPC · JPL
86892	2000 HQ_{32}	—	April 29, 2000	Socorro	LINEAR	·	1.6 km	MPC · JPL
86893	2000 HK_{33}	—	April 29, 2000	Socorro	LINEAR	·	2.5 km	MPC · JPL
86894	2000 HJ_{34}	—	April 25, 2000	Anderson Mesa	LONEOS	·	2.6 km	MPC · JPL
86895	2000 HW_{34}	—	April 25, 2000	Kvistaberg	Uppsala-DLR Asteroid Survey	·	2.9 km	MPC · JPL
86896	2000 HP_{37}	—	April 29, 2000	Socorro	LINEAR	·	3.0 km	MPC · JPL
86897	2000 HK_{39}	—	April 29, 2000	Kitt Peak	Spacewatch	V	1.5 km	MPC · JPL
86898	2000 HE_{40}	—	April 30, 2000	Kitt Peak	Spacewatch	NYS	2.9 km	MPC · JPL
86899	2000 HQ_{40}	—	April 28, 2000	Socorro	LINEAR	·	3.3 km	MPC · JPL
86900	2000 HM_{42}	—	April 29, 2000	Socorro	LINEAR	·	3.0 km	MPC · JPL

== 86901–87000 ==
back to top

Designation			Discovery			Properties		Ref
Permanent	Provisional	Named after	Date	Site	Discoverer(s)	Category	Diam.	Ref
86901	2000 HW_{44}	—	April 26, 2000	Anderson Mesa	LONEOS	·	1.7 km	MPC · JPL
86902	2000 HQ_{45}	—	April 26, 2000	Anderson Mesa	LONEOS	NYS	3.7 km	MPC · JPL
86903	2000 HK_{46}	—	April 29, 2000	Socorro	LINEAR	·	1.9 km	MPC · JPL
86904	2000 HM_{46}	—	April 29, 2000	Socorro	LINEAR	GEF	3.3 km	MPC · JPL
86905	2000 HT_{46}	—	April 29, 2000	Socorro	LINEAR	·	6.7 km	MPC · JPL
86906	2000 HZ_{46}	—	April 29, 2000	Socorro	LINEAR	·	3.9 km	MPC · JPL
86907	2000 HB_{47}	—	April 29, 2000	Socorro	LINEAR	·	2.1 km	MPC · JPL
86908	2000 HD_{48}	—	April 29, 2000	Socorro	LINEAR	·	2.3 km	MPC · JPL
86909	2000 HH_{48}	—	April 29, 2000	Socorro	LINEAR	·	4.8 km	MPC · JPL
86910	2000 HM_{48}	—	April 29, 2000	Socorro	LINEAR	·	2.3 km	MPC · JPL
86911	2000 HE_{50}	—	April 29, 2000	Socorro	LINEAR	·	1.9 km	MPC · JPL
86912	2000 HN_{50}	—	April 29, 2000	Socorro	LINEAR	·	2.8 km	MPC · JPL
86913	2000 HE_{51}	—	April 29, 2000	Socorro	LINEAR	·	2.1 km	MPC · JPL
86914	2000 HG_{51}	—	April 29, 2000	Socorro	LINEAR	·	2.2 km	MPC · JPL
86915	2000 HV_{51}	—	April 29, 2000	Socorro	LINEAR	V · slow	1.2 km	MPC · JPL
86916	2000 HG_{54}	—	April 29, 2000	Socorro	LINEAR	·	1.7 km	MPC · JPL
86917	2000 HT_{54}	—	April 29, 2000	Socorro	LINEAR	V	1.8 km	MPC · JPL
86918	2000 HY_{54}	—	April 29, 2000	Socorro	LINEAR	NYS	2.2 km	MPC · JPL
86919	2000 HE_{56}	—	April 24, 2000	Anderson Mesa	LONEOS	·	3.1 km	MPC · JPL
86920	2000 HM_{56}	—	April 24, 2000	Anderson Mesa	LONEOS	·	2.8 km	MPC · JPL
86921	2000 HV_{56}	—	April 24, 2000	Anderson Mesa	LONEOS	·	1.9 km	MPC · JPL
86922	2000 HZ_{56}	—	April 24, 2000	Anderson Mesa	LONEOS	·	2.1 km	MPC · JPL
86923	2000 HV_{58}	—	April 25, 2000	Anderson Mesa	LONEOS	·	2.7 km	MPC · JPL
86924	2000 HG_{59}	—	April 25, 2000	Anderson Mesa	LONEOS	·	2.3 km	MPC · JPL
86925	2000 HO_{59}	—	April 25, 2000	Anderson Mesa	LONEOS	·	2.5 km	MPC · JPL
86926	2000 HN_{60}	—	April 25, 2000	Anderson Mesa	LONEOS	PHO	1.7 km	MPC · JPL
86927	2000 HH_{61}	—	April 25, 2000	Anderson Mesa	LONEOS	(2076)	2.5 km	MPC · JPL
86928	2000 HJ_{62}	—	April 25, 2000	Kitt Peak	Spacewatch	·	2.0 km	MPC · JPL
86929	2000 HL_{65}	—	April 26, 2000	Anderson Mesa	LONEOS	·	1.7 km	MPC · JPL
86930	2000 HO_{65}	—	April 26, 2000	Anderson Mesa	LONEOS	NYS	2.1 km	MPC · JPL
86931	2000 HV_{65}	—	April 26, 2000	Anderson Mesa	LONEOS	·	2.4 km	MPC · JPL
86932	2000 HY_{65}	—	April 26, 2000	Anderson Mesa	LONEOS	ERI	2.7 km	MPC · JPL
86933	2000 HB_{66}	—	April 26, 2000	Anderson Mesa	LONEOS	·	2.9 km	MPC · JPL
86934	2000 HY_{66}	—	April 27, 2000	Anderson Mesa	LONEOS	·	1.6 km	MPC · JPL
86935	2000 HO_{69}	—	April 25, 2000	Anderson Mesa	LONEOS	NYS	2.4 km	MPC · JPL
86936	2000 HZ_{69}	—	April 26, 2000	Anderson Mesa	LONEOS	(2076)	2.1 km	MPC · JPL
86937	2000 HB_{70}	—	April 26, 2000	Anderson Mesa	LONEOS	·	1.8 km	MPC · JPL
86938	2000 HK_{70}	—	April 26, 2000	Anderson Mesa	LONEOS	·	2.2 km	MPC · JPL
86939	2000 HV_{70}	—	April 26, 2000	Anderson Mesa	LONEOS	·	3.0 km	MPC · JPL
86940	2000 HJ_{71}	—	April 24, 2000	Anderson Mesa	LONEOS	·	1.8 km	MPC · JPL
86941	2000 HY_{71}	—	April 25, 2000	Anderson Mesa	LONEOS	·	3.5 km	MPC · JPL
86942	2000 HD_{72}	—	April 25, 2000	Anderson Mesa	LONEOS	NYS	1.9 km	MPC · JPL
86943	2000 HA_{77}	—	April 27, 2000	Socorro	LINEAR	·	3.0 km	MPC · JPL
86944	2000 HN_{81}	—	April 29, 2000	Anderson Mesa	LONEOS	PHO	2.0 km	MPC · JPL
86945	2000 HE_{85}	—	April 29, 2000	Kitt Peak	Spacewatch	·	3.0 km	MPC · JPL
86946	2000 HG_{85}	—	April 29, 2000	Kitt Peak	Spacewatch	·	3.2 km	MPC · JPL
86947	2000 HV_{85}	—	April 30, 2000	Anderson Mesa	LONEOS	V	1.1 km	MPC · JPL
86948	2000 HK_{86}	—	April 30, 2000	Anderson Mesa	LONEOS	·	2.5 km	MPC · JPL
86949	2000 HE_{87}	—	April 30, 2000	Kitt Peak	Spacewatch	V	1.3 km	MPC · JPL
86950	2000 HC_{88}	—	April 27, 2000	Socorro	LINEAR	·	2.0 km	MPC · JPL
86951	2000 HL_{88}	—	April 27, 2000	Socorro	LINEAR	·	1.5 km	MPC · JPL
86952	2000 HT_{89}	—	April 29, 2000	Socorro	LINEAR	·	1.9 km	MPC · JPL
86953	2000 HS_{91}	—	April 30, 2000	Anderson Mesa	LONEOS	·	2.0 km	MPC · JPL
86954	2000 HF_{96}	—	April 28, 2000	Anderson Mesa	LONEOS	V	1.2 km	MPC · JPL
86955	2000 HK_{96}	—	April 28, 2000	Anderson Mesa	LONEOS	·	1.7 km	MPC · JPL
86956	2000 HD_{97}	—	April 27, 2000	Socorro	LINEAR	·	2.2 km	MPC · JPL
86957	2000 HB_{101}	—	April 25, 2000	Anderson Mesa	LONEOS	·	1.6 km	MPC · JPL
86958	2000 JQ	—	May 1, 2000	Socorro	LINEAR	·	1.7 km	MPC · JPL
86959	2000 JG_{1}	—	May 2, 2000	Socorro	LINEAR	PHO	2.5 km	MPC · JPL
86960	2000 JM_{1}	—	May 1, 2000	Socorro	LINEAR	·	1.6 km	MPC · JPL
86961	2000 JO_{1}	—	May 1, 2000	Socorro	LINEAR	·	2.4 km	MPC · JPL
86962	2000 JN_{2}	—	May 3, 2000	Socorro	LINEAR	·	1.9 km	MPC · JPL
86963	2000 JS_{2}	—	May 1, 2000	Socorro	LINEAR	V	1.1 km	MPC · JPL
86964	2000 JV_{2}	—	May 3, 2000	Socorro	LINEAR	·	2.5 km	MPC · JPL
86965	2000 JD_{6}	—	May 2, 2000	Socorro	LINEAR	·	4.7 km	MPC · JPL
86966	2000 JP_{8}	—	May 6, 2000	Socorro	LINEAR	·	5.6 km	MPC · JPL
86967	2000 JB_{9}	—	May 1, 2000	Socorro	LINEAR	·	2.0 km	MPC · JPL
86968	2000 JW_{10}	—	May 2, 2000	Socorro	LINEAR	·	2.2 km	MPC · JPL
86969	2000 JN_{11}	—	May 3, 2000	Socorro	LINEAR	·	3.5 km	MPC · JPL
86970	2000 JW_{11}	—	May 5, 2000	Socorro	LINEAR	·	1.8 km	MPC · JPL
86971	2000 JG_{13}	—	May 6, 2000	Socorro	LINEAR	·	1.8 km	MPC · JPL
86972	2000 JM_{13}	—	May 6, 2000	Socorro	LINEAR	·	2.5 km	MPC · JPL
86973	2000 JS_{14}	—	May 6, 2000	Socorro	LINEAR	·	2.4 km	MPC · JPL
86974	2000 JH_{15}	—	May 6, 2000	Socorro	LINEAR	·	2.3 km	MPC · JPL
86975	2000 JZ_{16}	—	May 5, 2000	Socorro	LINEAR	·	1.8 km	MPC · JPL
86976	2000 JJ_{17}	—	May 5, 2000	Socorro	LINEAR	·	2.3 km	MPC · JPL
86977	2000 JQ_{17}	—	May 6, 2000	Socorro	LINEAR	·	1.6 km	MPC · JPL
86978	2000 JT_{18}	—	May 3, 2000	Socorro	LINEAR	·	2.9 km	MPC · JPL
86979	2000 JW_{19}	—	May 6, 2000	Socorro	LINEAR	V	1.7 km	MPC · JPL
86980	2000 JT_{22}	—	May 7, 2000	Socorro	LINEAR	NYS	2.0 km	MPC · JPL
86981	2000 JM_{24}	—	May 7, 2000	Socorro	LINEAR	·	3.5 km	MPC · JPL
86982	2000 JG_{25}	—	May 7, 2000	Socorro	LINEAR	·	2.5 km	MPC · JPL
86983	2000 JA_{26}	—	May 7, 2000	Socorro	LINEAR	·	2.9 km	MPC · JPL
86984	2000 JF_{26}	—	May 7, 2000	Socorro	LINEAR	·	2.8 km	MPC · JPL
86985	2000 JU_{29}	—	May 7, 2000	Socorro	LINEAR	·	2.6 km	MPC · JPL
86986	2000 JM_{30}	—	May 7, 2000	Socorro	LINEAR	·	2.5 km	MPC · JPL
86987	2000 JW_{30}	—	May 7, 2000	Socorro	LINEAR	·	1.7 km	MPC · JPL
86988	2000 JB_{31}	—	May 7, 2000	Socorro	LINEAR	·	2.7 km	MPC · JPL
86989	2000 JO_{32}	—	May 7, 2000	Socorro	LINEAR	·	3.7 km	MPC · JPL
86990	2000 JJ_{34}	—	May 7, 2000	Socorro	LINEAR	·	2.8 km	MPC · JPL
86991	2000 JX_{34}	—	May 7, 2000	Socorro	LINEAR	·	2.2 km	MPC · JPL
86992	2000 JN_{35}	—	May 7, 2000	Socorro	LINEAR	·	2.0 km	MPC · JPL
86993	2000 JH_{36}	—	May 7, 2000	Socorro	LINEAR	·	2.1 km	MPC · JPL
86994	2000 JP_{36}	—	May 7, 2000	Socorro	LINEAR	·	2.3 km	MPC · JPL
86995	2000 JG_{37}	—	May 7, 2000	Socorro	LINEAR	NYS	3.1 km	MPC · JPL
86996	2000 JM_{37}	—	May 7, 2000	Socorro	LINEAR	·	2.2 km	MPC · JPL
86997	2000 JQ_{37}	—	May 7, 2000	Socorro	LINEAR	NYS	2.2 km	MPC · JPL
86998	2000 JG_{39}	—	May 7, 2000	Socorro	LINEAR	(2076)	2.3 km	MPC · JPL
86999	2000 JG_{40}	—	May 7, 2000	Socorro	LINEAR	·	1.7 km	MPC · JPL
87000	2000 JE_{43}	—	May 7, 2000	Socorro	LINEAR	(5)	2.5 km	MPC · JPL

back to top

== See also ==
- Meanings of minor-planet names: 86001–87000
