= San Torpete =

Church building in Genoa, Italy

Coordinates: 44°24′25.78″N 8°55′45.64″E

Church of Saint Torpes (Chiesa di San Torpete)
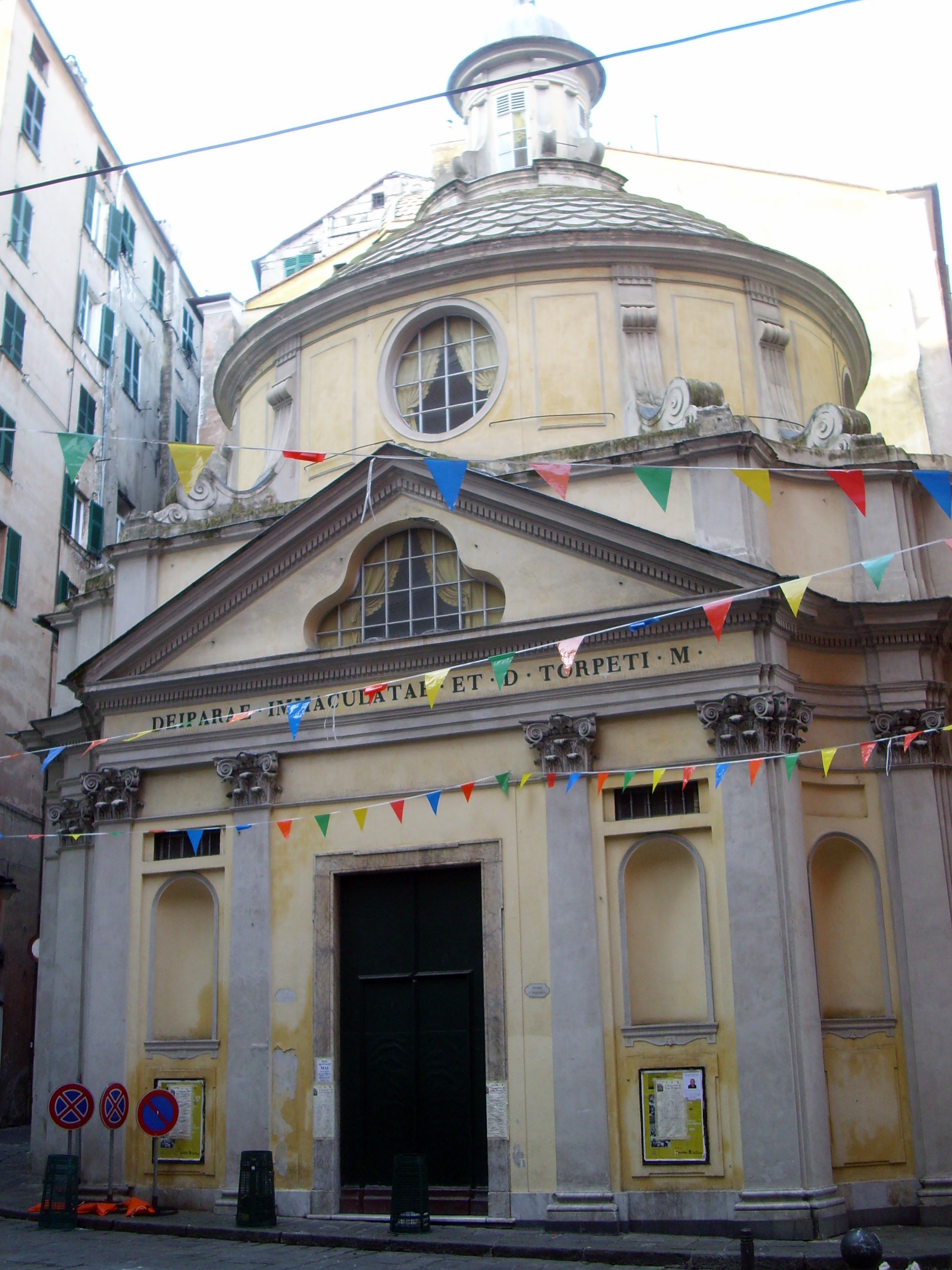
- The façade of the church.

Religion
- Affiliation: Roman Catholic
- Province: Genoa
- Ecclesiastical or organisational status: National monument
- Status: Active

Location
- Location: Genoa, Italy
- Interactive map of Church of Saint Torpes (Chiesa di San Torpete)

Architecture
- Type: Church
- Style: Baroque
- Groundbreaking: 1730
- Completed: 1733

San Torpete is a church in central Genoa, northern Italy, dedicated to Saint Torpes. It was founded in the 11th century by local merchants. It was rebuilt in 1730 under designs conceived by Giovanni Antonio Ricca.

The interior ceiling is decorated with paintings and stucco by Giovanni Bernardo Carlone depicting scenes of the Life of San Torpete. An altarpiece of Madonna with St Thomas Becket of Canterbury, St Lucia and John the Baptist is attributed to the studio of Luca Cambiaso or Andrea Semini. The small statue of the Virgin of Providence at the main altar was completed by Giovanni Battista Drago. The altar of San Filippo Neri has a painting depicting The Saint in ecstasy attributed to the studio of Giovanni Battista Paggi.

== See also ==
- 18th-century Western domes

== Sources ==
- Paglieri, Nadia Pazzini; Rinangelo Paglieri (1990). Chiese in Liguria. Genoa: Sagep Editrice. ISBN 88-7058-361-9.
