= Hotel Paradise (album) =

Studio album by Diva Gray
- Released: 1979
- Studio: Le Nouveau Studios, Power Station Studios
- Genre: Disco
- Label: Columbia
- Producer: Luigi Ojival

Hotel Paradise is the debut and only album by American disco vocalist Diva Gray, recorded for and released on Columbia Records. The album features the title track and "St. Tropez". It was produced by Luigi Ojival, which this album on LP is credited "Diva Gray & Oyster".

== Track listing ==
1. St. Tropez (Michel Gouty, Pierre Nacabal) 5:45
2. Up And Down (Gouty, Nacabal, Janice Marlene) 6:48
3. Hotel Paradise (Nacabal, Christine Bennett, Michel Beaucarty) 5:48
4. Good, Good Tequila (Beaucarty, Marlene, Nacabal) 6:47
5. Magic Carpet Ride (Bennett, Beaucarty, Nacabal) 4:39

Bonus digital track

- Call Me (I Got What You Want)

== Personnel ==
- All vocals by Diva Gray
- Music played by Oyster (Luigi Ojival)
