= Paradise Hotel (2010 film) =

- Directed by: Sophia Tzavella
- Produced by: Martichka Bozhilova
- Cinematography: Georgi Bogdanov, Boris Missirkov
- Edited by: Nina Altaparmakova
- Release date: 2010
- Running time: 54 minutes
- Country: Bulgaria
- Language: Bulgarian

Paradise Hotel (also known as Hotel Rai, Хотел Рай) is a 2010 Bulgarian documentary film directed by Sophia Tzavella. It depicts the lives of Roma living in an apartment block in a village in Yambol Province, Bulgaria.

The film received the FIPRESCI award for a film in the International selection at the 13th Thessaloniki International Film Festival.
