= François Mercurio =

French footballer (1930-2010)

Personal information
- Date of birth: 19 January 1930
- Place of birth: Tefeschoun, French Algeria, France
- Date of death: 27 December 2010 (aged 80)
- Place of death: Martigues, Bouches-du-Rhône, France

Senior career*
Years	Team	Apps	(Gls)
1942-1949	Olympique Littoral		
1949-1958	Olympique de Marseille	134	(21)
1958-1959	SO Montpellier		
1959-?	AS Maximoise		
?-?	SPC de Plantourian		

International career
1948	France Olympic	Called up	
- * Club domestic league appearances and goals

François Mercurio (19 January 1930 – 27 December 2010) was a French footballer. He was part of France Football squad for the 1948 Summer Olympics.

== Club career ==
He started football in 1942 at Olympique Littoral In 1949 he went to Olympique de Marseille where he stayed 9 years. In 1958-1959 he played for SO Montpellier. Afterwards he played for AS Maximoise and SPC de Plantourian.

== International career ==
He was selected in France Football squad for the 1948 Summer Olympics, but was an unused substitute for the two Games against India and Great Britain, as France were eliminated in the Quarterfinals.

He never had a cap with France.
