= François Spoerry =

French architect, developer, and urban planner

- Born: 28 December 1912; Mulhouse, Alsace, France
- Died: 11 January 1999 (aged 86); Port Grimaud, Var, France
- Occupation: Architect
- Known for: Tour de l'Europe
- Spouse: Joy Pierrette Besse
- Children: Yves Spoerry; Bernard Spoerry

François Henry Spoerry (28 December 1912 – 11 January 1999) was a French architect, developer, and urban planner who created the seaside town of Port Grimaud. He was an Officier of the Légion d'honneur and an Officier of the Ordre des Arts et des Lettres.

== Early years ==
He was born in Mulhouse to a large, industrious family that had moved from Switzerland to Mulhouse in 1848 to start up a textile business. The family had a holiday home at Partigon. His parents were Henry Spoerry (1879–1966) and Jeanne Schlumberger. Spoerry had three younger sisters: Anne-Marie, a physician, aviator and adventurer, Therese, and Martine.

After finishing school, Spoerry studied architecture at the École des Beaux-Arts, Strasbourg in 1930. He became an assistant to Jacques Couëlle during the period of 1932 through 1934. He graduated from Marseille's École des Beaux-Arts in 1943 .

During World War II, he used an architectural research project in Aix-en-Provence as a cover for working with the French Resistance. In April 1943, he was arrested and deported to Buchenwald and then Dachau.

== Career ==
"My ambition has been to produce a style of architecture that makes the heart sing."

—

After the war ended, he opened his first architectural firm in Mulhouse where he associated with a significant number of reconstruction projects. In Mulhouse, he was the planner of the new town centre. He also built in Mulhouse the Tour of Europe, the largest structure in contemporary France whose top floor was a revolving restaurant. He also built several residential structures, including Wilson Tower (highest building in the city after the Tour of Europe), the Residence Clemenceau. Residence Pierrefontaine, and others. What is most significance about the work of Spoerry is that he broke with the first principles of Planning CIAM while rediscovering the principles of a dense urbanism. He built and developed several mixed-use, neo-traditional, developments in Europe and North America.

At the end of the 1980s, he was known as a member of Amiic (World Real Estate Investment Organization, Geneva) and was a lecturer, with Jean-Pierre Thiollet and other important people, of some international meetings of this organization (which was dissolved in 1997).

He is associated with the European Urban Renaissance movement. He was an advocate of "vernacular architecture". Spoerry is the author of A gentle architecture, from Port-Grimaud to Port-Liberté, published in 1991.

Apart from the creation of Port Grimaud in Var, Spoerry's major works in France include:

- district of Cergy-Pontoise
- development of the Tour Perret in Amiens, built by Auguste Perret, in
- Tour de l'Europe, in Mulhouse
- center of the city of Le Plessis-Robinson
- New village of Gassin

Outside France his major works were:

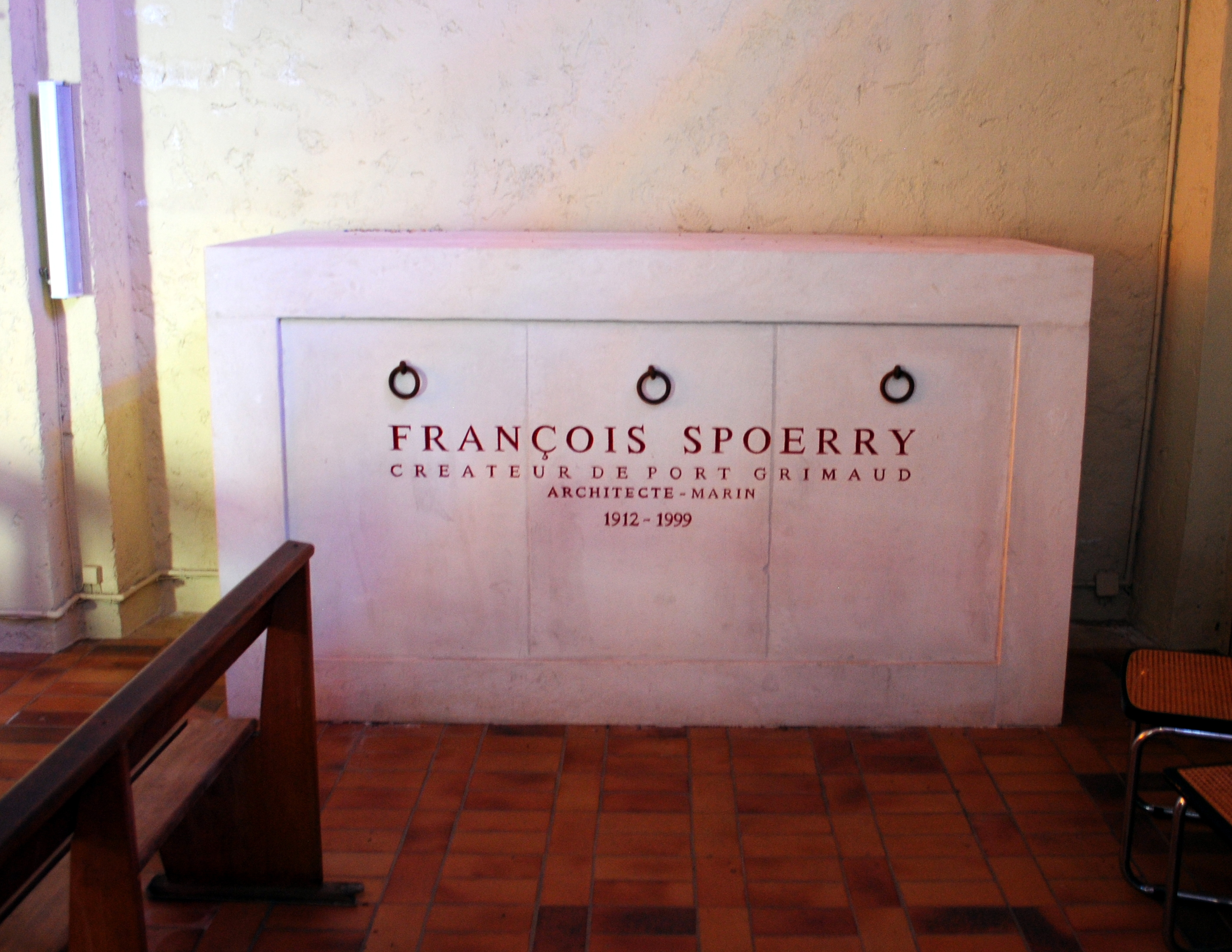
His tomb at the church in Port Grimaud

- Puerto Escondido, Baja California Sur, Mexico
- neighborhood of Port Liberté, Jersey City, New Jersey, USA
- district of Porto Cervo in Sardinia, Italy
- district of Port Louis in Louisiana, USA
- village of Bendinat in Majorca, Spain
- Saifi Village, Beirut, Lebanon

== Personal life ==
On 27 October 1945, Spoerry married Joy Pierrette Besse (1923–1952). Spoerry and his wife had two sons, Yves and Bernard.

His father-in-law, Antonin Besse, was a wealthy merchant with businesses in Aden and Beirut. Also a philanthropist, Antonin founded St Antony's College, Oxford, and saved Gordonstoun in Moray, Scotland from closure.

Spoerry was an avid sailor, owning the schooner Amphitrite between 1966 and 1969. He died at his home in Port Grimaud in 1999 and is buried at the church in Port Grimaud.
