= Ramatuelle =

- Commune
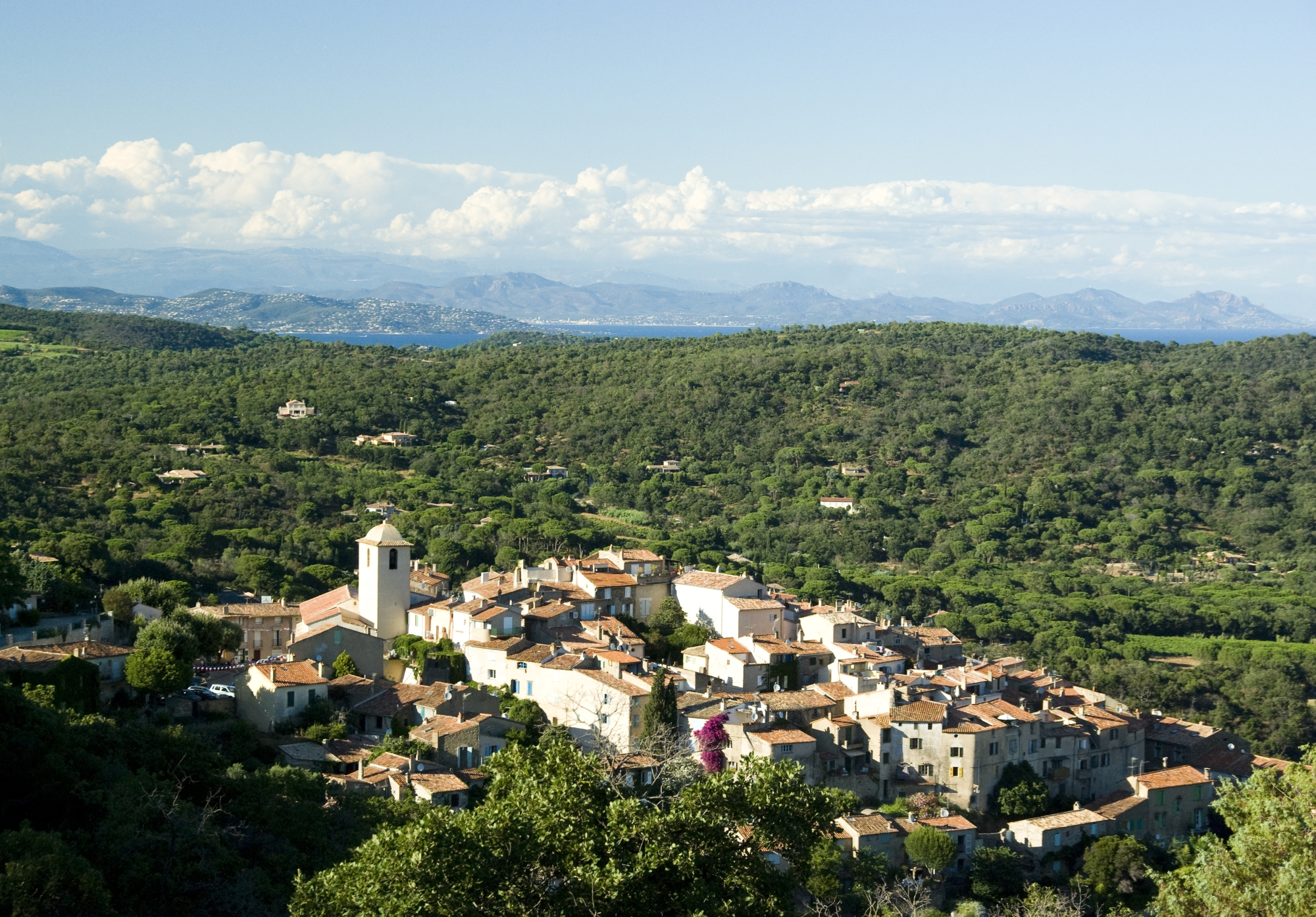
- A view of Ramatuelle

- Coat of arms
- Location of Ramatuelle
- Location within France Location within Provence-Alpes-Côte d'Azur
- Coordinates: 43°13′00″N 6°36′43″E
- Country: France
- Region: Provence-Alpes-Côte d'Azur
- Department: Var
- Arrondissement: Draguignan
- Canton: Sainte-Maxime
- Intercommunality: Communauté de communes du Golfe de Saint-Tropez

Government
  - Mayor (2020–2026): Roland Bruno (PS)
- Area^{1}: 35.57 km^{2} (13.73 sq mi)
- Elevation: 146 m (479 ft)
- Highest elevation: 324 m (1,063 ft)
- Lowest elevation: 0 m (0 ft)
- Population (2023): 1,888
  - Density: 53.08/km^{2} (137.5/sq mi)
- Time zone: UTC+01:00 (CET)
  - Summer (DST): UTC+02:00 (CEST)
- INSEE/Postal code: 83101 /83350
- ^{1} French Land Register data, which excludes lakes, ponds, glaciers > 1 km^{2} (0.386 sq mi or 247 acres) and river estuaries.

Ramatuelle (French pronunciation: [ʁamatɥɛl]; Provençal: Ramatuela) is a commune in the southeastern French department of Var.

== History ==
Ramatuelle lies near St-Tropez, Sainte-Maxime and Gassin. It was built on a hill to defend itself against enemies. The town was known in the Middle Ages as Ramatuella (either derived from the tribe of the Camatullici or from the Arabic Rahmatollah i.e. رحمة الله 'the mercy of God') and was part of the area ruled by the Moors of nearby Fraxinet in the ninth and tenth centuries.

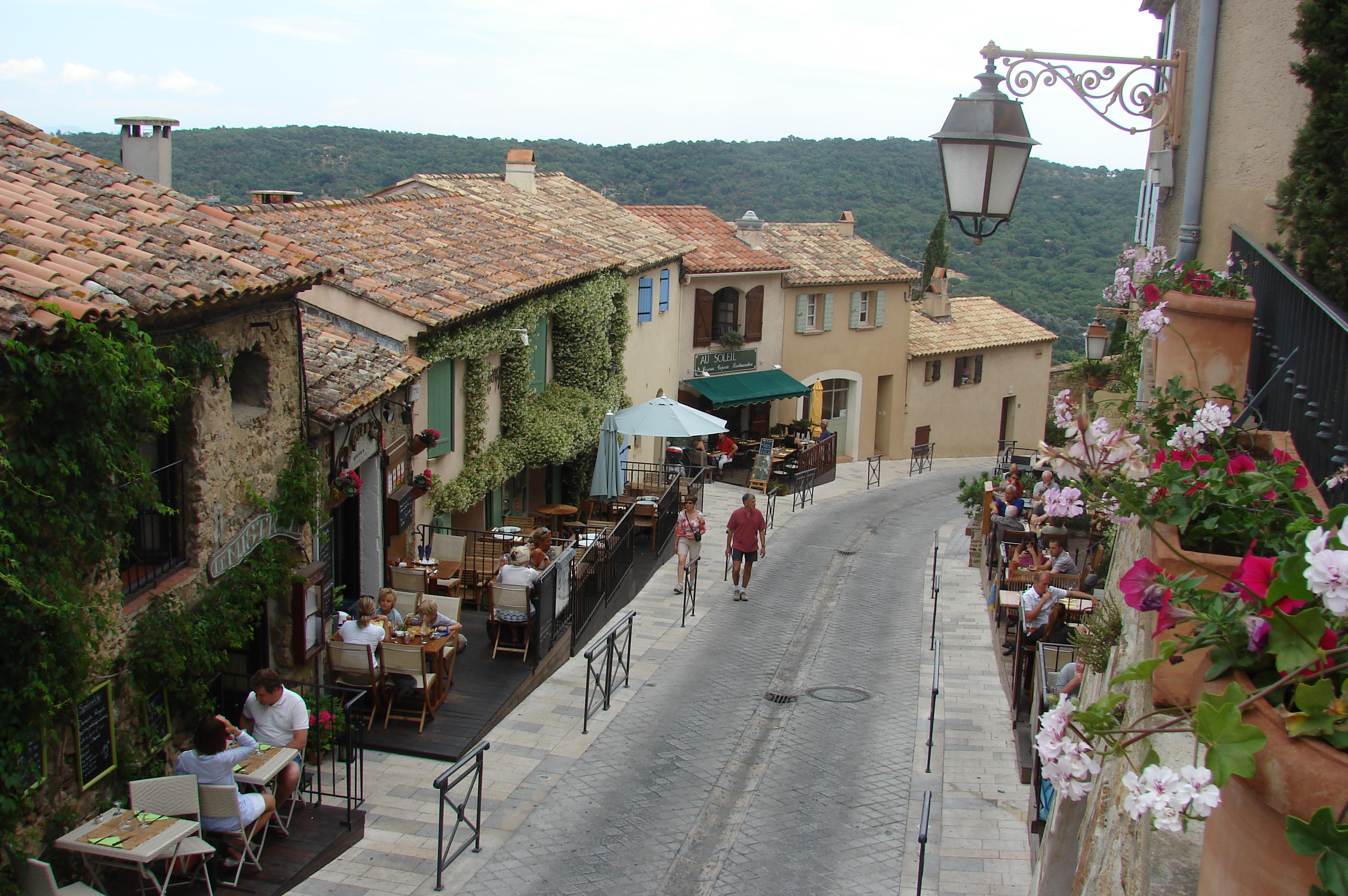
Centre of the village

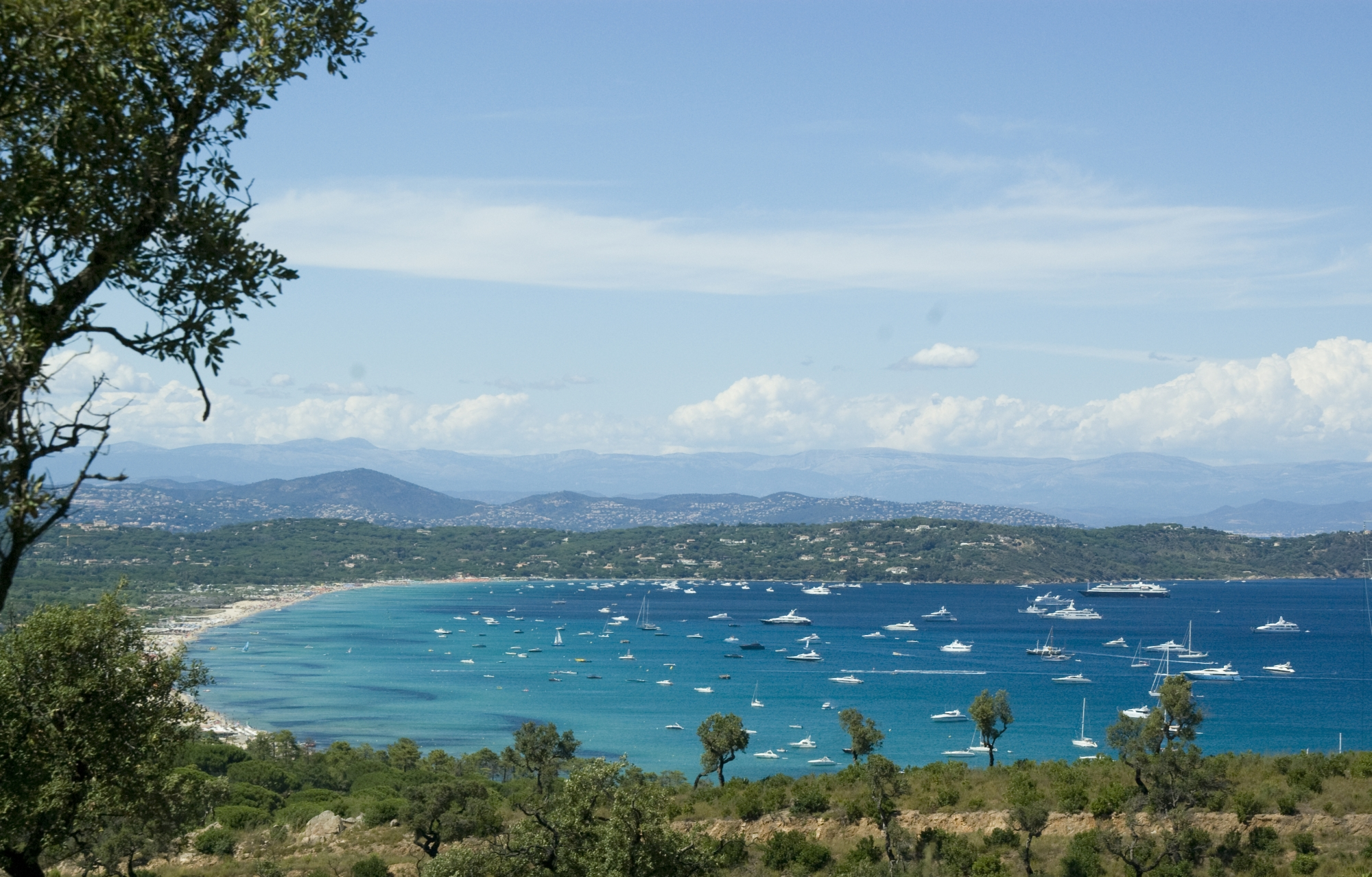
Mediterranean coast

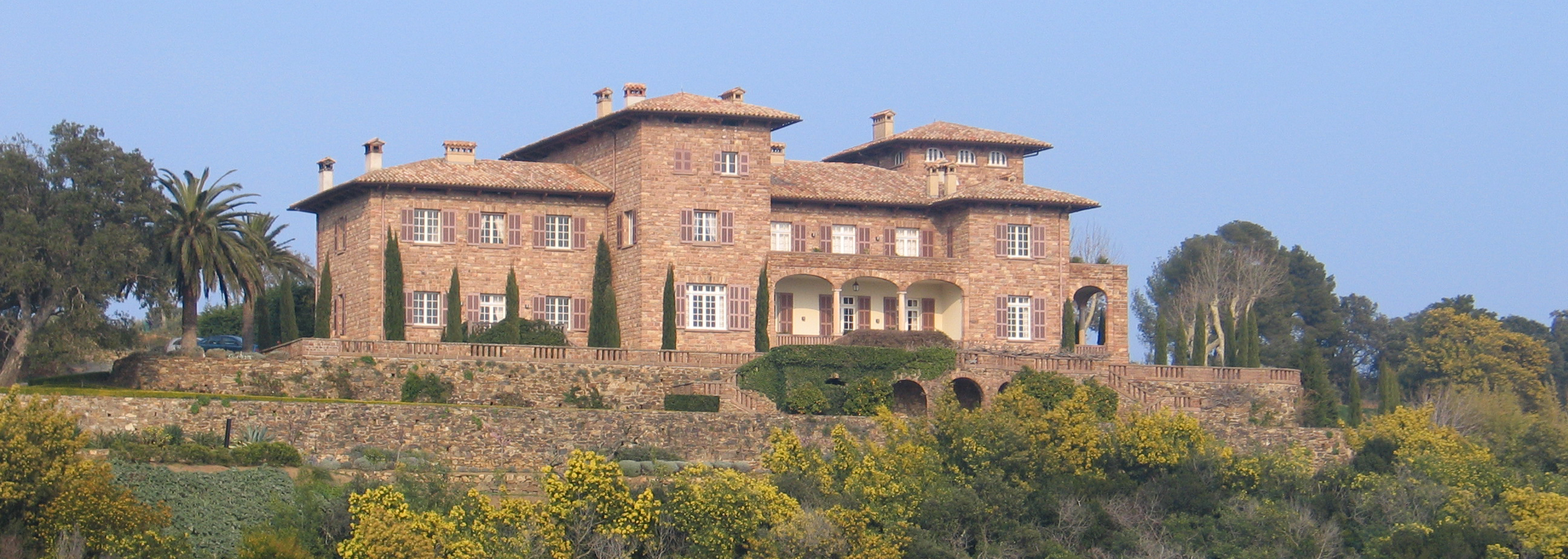
Château Volterra.

== Geography ==
=== Climate ===
Ramatuelle has a hot-summer Mediterranean climate (Köppen climate classification Csa). The average annual temperature in Ramatuelle is 16.2 °C (61.2 °F). The average annual rainfall is 696.8 mm (27.43 in) with October as the wettest month. The temperatures are highest on average in August, at around 24.4 °C (75.9 °F), and lowest in January, at around 9.9 °C (49.8 °F). The highest temperature ever recorded in Ramatuelle was 37.3 °C (99.1 °F) on 16 August 2021; the coldest temperature ever recorded was −10.0 °C (14.0 °F) on 10 February 1956.

Climate data for Ramatuelle (Cape Camarat, altitude 107m, 1981–2010 normals, extremes 1949–present)
Month	Jan	Feb	Mar	Apr	May	Jun	Jul	Aug	Sep	Oct	Nov	Dec	Year
Record high °C (°F)	22.1 (71.8)	25.7 (78.3)	26.1 (79.0)	28.2 (82.8)	32.0 (89.6)	34.9 (94.8)	36.9 (98.4)	37.3 (99.1)	33.4 (92.1)	29.3 (84.7)	24.8 (76.6)	23.0 (73.4)	37.3 (99.1)
Mean daily maximum °C (°F)	12.8 (55.0)	13.2 (55.8)	15.3 (59.5)	17.1 (62.8)	20.9 (69.6)	24.6 (76.3)	28.0 (82.4)	28.5 (83.3)	24.9 (76.8)	20.7 (69.3)	16.2 (61.2)	13.5 (56.3)	19.7 (67.5)
Daily mean °C (°F)	9.8 (49.6)	9.9 (49.8)	11.7 (53.1)	13.6 (56.5)	17.3 (63.1)	20.9 (69.6)	24.1 (75.4)	24.4 (75.9)	21.2 (70.2)	17.6 (63.7)	13.2 (55.8)	10.6 (51.1)	16.2 (61.2)
Mean daily minimum °C (°F)	6.9 (44.4)	6.6 (43.9)	8.2 (46.8)	10.1 (50.2)	13.8 (56.8)	17.3 (63.1)	20.1 (68.2)	20.4 (68.7)	17.5 (63.5)	14.5 (58.1)	10.3 (50.5)	7.7 (45.9)	12.8 (55.0)
Record low °C (°F)	−8.0 (17.6)	−10.0 (14.0)	−5.4 (22.3)	0.8 (33.4)	4.8 (40.6)	9.0 (48.2)	13.0 (55.4)	11.8 (53.2)	9.0 (48.2)	2.8 (37.0)	−2.5 (27.5)	−2.8 (27.0)	−10.0 (14.0)
Average precipitation mm (inches)	77.0 (3.03)	50.0 (1.97)	45.6 (1.80)	70.9 (2.79)	38.9 (1.53)	31.5 (1.24)	11.7 (0.46)	22.8 (0.90)	61.9 (2.44)	119.0 (4.69)	83.8 (3.30)	83.7 (3.30)	696.8 (27.43)
Average precipitation days (≥ 1.0 mm)	6.1	5.5	5.0	6.9	4.5	2.9	1.2	2.0	4.3	7.5	7.4	7.0	60.4
Source: Météo-France

== Population ==
Historical population
Year	Pop.	±% p.a.
1968	1,253	—
1975	1,209	−0.51%
1982	1,762	+5.53%
1990	1,945	+1.24%
1999	2,131	+1.02%
2007	2,272	+0.80%
2012	2,126	−1.32%
2017	2,070	−0.53%
2023	1,888	−1.52%
Source: INSEE

== Notable people ==
- David Hamilton (British photographer), lived here around 1975-1980
- Michel Berger, French musician and music producer, died here in 1992.
- Gérard Philipe, French actor, was buried here in 1959.

== See also ==
- Communes of the Var department
- Umayyad invasion of Gaul
