= Luxéol =

French brand

- Produced by: Nutravalia
- Country: France
- Introduced: 2016
- Website: https://luxeol.com

Luxéol is a French brand specializing in hair care and supplements food products dedicated to hair. Launched in 2016, it is based in Mougins, in the Alpes-Maritimes. The brand was co-founded by brothers Michel and Samuel Bouskila.

== History ==
Luxéol was launched in 2016 by Michel and Samuel Bouskila in Mougins. Initially focused on hair dietary supplements, the brand expanded its range in the early 2020s to include hair care products.

In 2022, European investment fund CAPZA acquired a stake in Nutravalia, the company operating Luxéol. Following the transaction, founders Michel and Samuel Bouskila retained a majority stake in the group. In 2023, Luxéol was launched in Spain and Italy.

In January 2024, Luxéol partnered with the association Coiffeurs Justes, which collects hair from salons to produce absorbent filters used in pollution cleanup operations in French ports. Hair booms produced through the initiative have been deployed in ports including Juan-les-Pins, Cavalaire and Marseille.

In 2025, Luxéol achieved a turnover of 45 million euros.

== Activities ==
Luxéol develops hair care products targeting issues such as hair growth, hair loss and scalp care. Its range includes dietary supplements and hair cosmetics, including capsules, gummies, oral solutions, shampoos, conditioners, masks, serums, oils and leave-in treatments. In 2024, pharmacies accounted for around 70% of the brand's revenue.
