= La Môle–Saint-Tropez Airport =

The International Airport of the Golfe of Saint Tropez – Saint Tropez Airport Aéroport du golfe de Saint-Tropez – La Mole
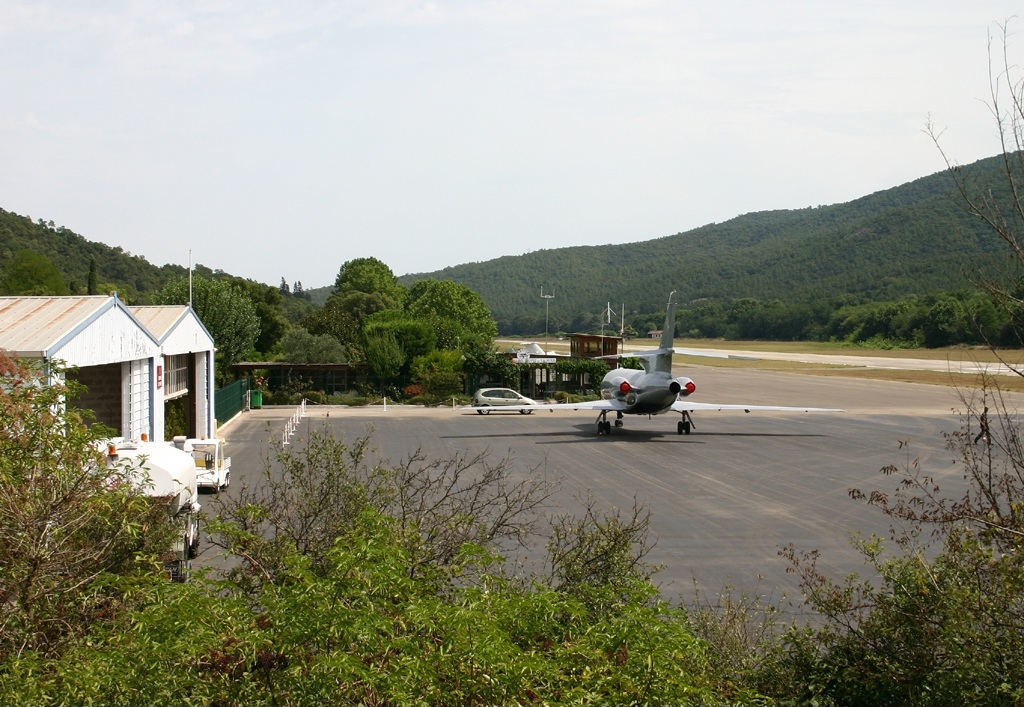
- IATA: LTT; ICAO: LFTZ

Summary
- Airport type: Public
- Operator: S.A Aéroport du Golfe de Saint-Tropez
- Serves: Saint-Tropez, France
- Location: La Môle
- Elevation AMSL: 59 ft (18 m)
- Coordinates: 43°12′23″N 006°28′57″E
- Website: sainttropez.aeroport.fr

Map
- Location in Provence-Alpes-Côte d'Azur region LFTZ (France)

Runways
Direction	Length		Surface
Direction	m	ft	Surface
06/24	1,180	3,871	Asphalt
- Sources: AIP France, UAF

The Airport of the Golfe of Saint Tropez (Aéroport du golfe de Saint-Tropez, IATA: LTT, ICAO: LFTZ) is an airport located in La Môle, 15 km (8 NM) southwest of Saint-Tropez, in the Var department of the Provence-Alpes-Côte d'Azur region in southeastern France.

Aéroports de la Côte d'Azur (ACA) announced July 26, 2013 it has acquired 99.9% of shares of AGST (Saint-Tropez Airport), previously owned by the Reybier group for the past 15 years.

== Facilities ==
The airport is at an elevation of 59 feet (18 m) above mean sea level. It has one paved runway designated 06/24 (QFU 062° / 242°) which measures 1,180 by 30 metres (3,871 ft × 98 ft) with illuminated signs and a parallel taxiway. It is equipped with a PAPI.

The airport buildings comprise a terminal building with a floor area of 750 m^{2} featuring a bar, a hangar of 1,200 m^{2}, a gas station for Avgas aviation fuel and a weather station. It is suitable for the disabled and has parking for 100 cars.

The terminal can handle up to 40,000 passengers per year. It is open to domestic civilian traffic; international service is possible on request 24 hours in advance. The main working hours are from 0700h to 1900 and on request from sunrise to sunset. It is not equipped to operate at night due to the lack of runway lights.

== Additional information ==
Service AFIS available frequency 118.125: November–March: 0800-1100, 1200-1600 UTC and from April to October: 0630-1700 UTC. Other on request.

- Aeronautical District : Côte d'Azur.
- BRIA affiliation: Nice
- ARFF Level 2 is available (level 3 and 4 on request).

In 2006, it handled 7,197 passenger flights, including 5,847 international and 6,898 freight movements. In 2002, passenger flights accounted for 15,049 movements and freight movements 6146 .

== Airlines and destinations ==
The following airlines operate regular scheduled and charter flights at La Môle – Saint-Tropez Airport:

Airlines	Destinations
Air Mountain	Seasonal: Geneva, Sion
Luxwing	Seasonal: Cuneo, Parma
Alpes Hélicoptères	Monaco, Nice
SmallFly	Seasonal: Nice
