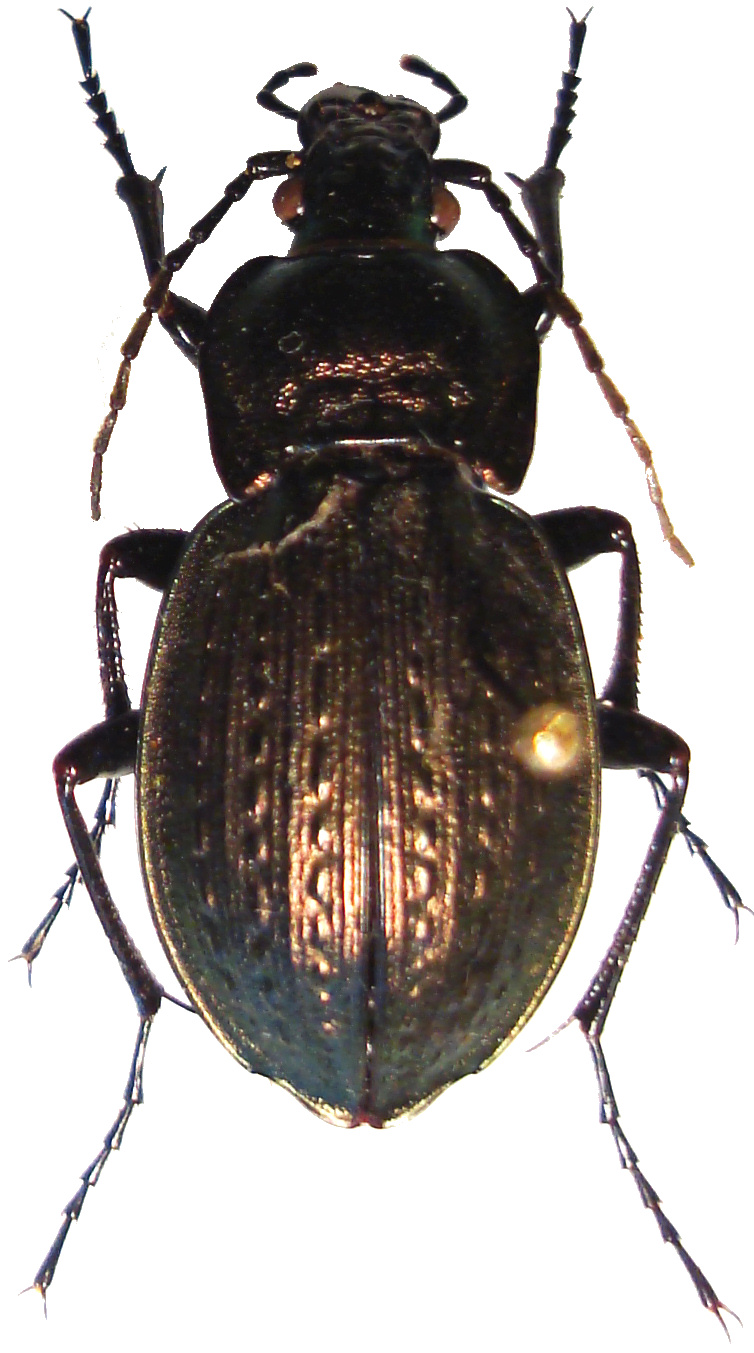
- Carabus vagans from Cogolin, France

Scientific classification
- Kingdom: Animalia
- Phylum: Arthropoda
- Clade: Pancrustacea
- Class: Insecta
- Order: Coleoptera
- Suborder: Adephaga
- Family: Carabidae
- Genus: Carabus
- Species: C. vagans

Binomial name
- Carabus vagans Olivier, 1795

Synonyms
- Carabus triglyphicus Ochs, 1965; Carabus ligustinus Csiki, 1927; Carabus borni Barthe, 1921; Carabus matheyi Born, 1917; Carabus liguricus Lapouge, 1902

= Carabus vagans =

Species of beetle

Carabus vagans is a species of ground beetle in the Carabinae subfamily that could be found in France and Italy.
