= Les Bateaux Verts =

Ferry company

Les Bateaux Verts is a ferry company operating a service between Saint-Tropez, Sainte-Maxime, Port Grimaud and Les Issambres.
