= Michel Darluc =

French naturalist

- Born: 28 September 1717; Grimaud, France
- Died: 18 October 1783 (aged 66); Aix-en-Provence, France
- Education: Barcelona, Aix-en-Provence
- Known for: Histoire naturelle de la Provence
- Scientific career
- Fields: Doctor and naturalist
- Workplaces: Aix University

Michel Darluc was a French medical doctor and naturalist, born on 28 September 1717 in Grimaud, Var and died on 18 October 1783 in Aix-en-Provence, Bouches-du-Rhône).

== Biography ==
When Darluc was very young he was secretary of a prince from the Holy Roman Empire with whom he travelled for several years in the Holy Roman Empire, Italy and Spain. He studied medicine in Barcelona for two years and came to Aix-en-Provence to study anatomy and botany under the direction of the famous Lieutaud, nephew of Garidel. He went to Paris to take chemistry lessons from Guillaume-François Rouelle before settling in Callian, Var. His successes having soon brought him to notice, he was then appointed professor of botany at the University of Aix, without his knowledge and thanks to Gibelin, his colleague at the Academy of Marseille. He founded the botanical garden of Aix which extended over part of the Cours St-Louis.

He travelled through Provence, taking an interest in all of natural history, collecting the information necessary for his book Histoire naturelle de la Provence, not hesitating to descend into the coal mines of Fuveau and Gardanne. The first two volumes appeared in 1782 and 1784. Having become completely blind, he died in 1783, unable to finish the third volume. His friend Gibelin undertook to revise the manuscript and had it published in 1786. The author adopted for his presentation the division of the dioceses which, according to him, was made by nature itself, which is not the case of the "vigueries" established solely for accounting purposes. It described all of natural history (geology, ornithology, botany, etc.), economic activities (agriculture, fishing, mining, etc.) and domestic economy.

He described about 120 species of birds with their scientific names, as well as those in French and Provençal. His work was the first work describing a regional avifauna in France. It also describes the mammals of Provence, wild or domestic.

On the social level, Darluc criticized the lack of hygiene on farms, where manure is stored against the houses and was alarmed at the infant mortality.

In the field of botany, he praised the contribution of Linnaeus:

Those who want to make greater progress in botany should study the system of the famous Linnaeus (volume I, p. 67).

In relation to the mandrake, for which magical virtues were once attached, he reported that "modern philosophy has cured us of all these humiliating errors for the human spirit" and recognized that certain practices were still current and in particular the use of an ointment composed of henbane, nightshade and mandrake used by good women who believe in magic (volume II p. 291/2). Indeed these Solanaceae contain alkaloids (hyoscyamine, atropine and scopolamine) still used in pharmacies and had caused many accidents in the past.

The problems of forest fires in the Mediterranean region were already serious:

We clear the hillsides and develop them; For this purpose, pine and cistus fellings are burned on the ground to be sown immediately after the first autumn rains. This practice leads to disastrous fires that the winds propagate far away... (volume III p. 281-282).

== Principal publications ==
- Traité des eaux minérales de Gréoulx en Provence (Aix, 1777)
- Histoire naturelle de la Provence, contenant ce qu’il y a de plus remarquable dans les règnes végétal, minéral, animal, et la partie géoponique en trois volumes (J.-J. Niel, Avignon, 1782-1786)
- Various articles in Le Journal de médecine.
- Alain Collomp, Un médecin des Lumières. Michel Darluc, naturalise provençal, Presses universitaires de Rennes, 2011.
