= Le Plan-de-la-Tour =

- Commune
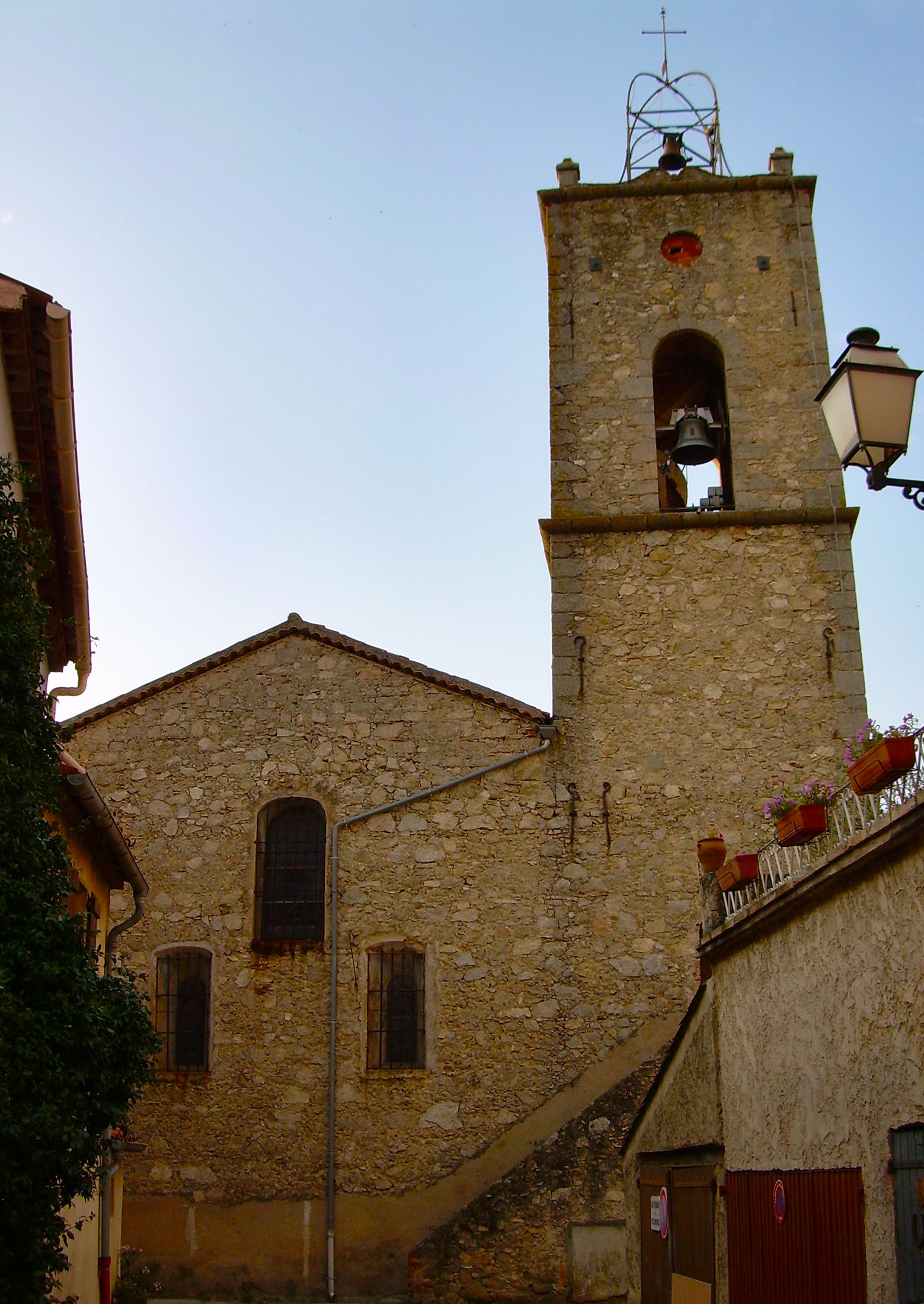
- The church of Saint-Martin, in Le Plan-de-la-Tour

- Coat of arms
- Location of Le Plan-de-la-Tour
- Location within France Location within Provence-Alpes-Côte d'Azur
- Coordinates: 43°20′29″N 6°32′50″E
- Country: France
- Region: Provence-Alpes-Côte d'Azur
- Department: Var
- Arrondissement: Draguignan
- Canton: Sainte-Maxime

Government
  - Mayor (2020–2026): Laurent Giubergia
- Area^{1}: 36.8 km^{2} (14.2 sq mi)
- Elevation: 60 m (200 ft)
- Highest elevation: 540 m (1,770 ft)
- Lowest elevation: 25 m (82 ft)
- Population (2023): 3,125
  - Density: 84.9/km^{2} (220/sq mi)
- Time zone: UTC+01:00 (CET)
  - Summer (DST): UTC+02:00 (CEST)
- INSEE/Postal code: 83094 /83120
- ^{1} French Land Register data, which excludes lakes, ponds, glaciers > 1 km^{2} (0.386 sq mi or 247 acres) and river estuaries.

Le Plan-de-la-Tour (French pronunciation: [lə plɑ̃ də la tuʁ]; Occitan: Lo Plan de la Torre, before 2008: Plan-de-la-Tour) is a commune in the Var department in the Provence-Alpes-Côte d'Azur region in southeastern France.

The small, quiet community is today best known because Johnny Depp and Vanessa Paradis became part-time residents in 2001, when Depp bought a 37-acre estate, including an entire hameau (hamlet) of stone buildings built in 1812. Depp listed the estate for sale in 2015.

== History ==
Isolated by its remoteness, the current Préconil valley (vallée du Préconil), formerly known as the Val d'Avignon, was almost completely uninhabited for a long time. In the 16th century, in this wide open area, a few agricultural, forestry and residential buildings began to appear close to sources of water which did not dry up during the long summer droughts. These houses gradually became hamlets, initially, the descendants of the same family.

One of these hamlets, Saint-Martin, the center of the current village, became the chief town of fact and law, the Commonwealth, which since the 16th century, has set itself on common locations. In Provence, in general, the limits of communes are those of former lordships. That is not the case of Plan de la Tour, which consists of three former districts under the Ancien Régime, different feudal units which appeared at the end of the 15th century, and where a population which, by geography places and its way of life, a sense of solidarity in the right to administer itself.

Most of this population has set in the upper valley or are the hamlets of Saint-Martin, Préconil, Vernet, Pennes, Pierrons. Prat-L'Estagnol, Valauri and Emponse. On the eve of the French Revolution, the inhabitants of these places, administratively attached to La Garde-Freinet, were remarkably structured and were "three masters in surgery and artisans of almost all species." The most authoritative chroniclers, at the time, write that the peasants of this district are laborious and bold, active for trade and religious.

The second part of the commune is made by the High Quartier de Saint-Pierre de Miramas and covers the hamlets of Prat-Bourdin, the Plan, Bagarri and Gassine. It is pegged at Sainte-Maxime and the hamlet of Revest that perpetuates the name of this stronghold deleted during the Revolution.

During the 18th century, these people formed a self-governing community itself. The crisis of emancipation behind it crystallized, under the officially Catholic state, around the thorny issue of the erection of a parish in St. Martin. This attempt failed. It was taken during the Revolution, and 11 July 1790 the active citizens of Saint-Martin Plan de la Tour meet in the Church and proclaimed independent of La Garde-Freinet. Historically, La Garde showed a fierce opposition to secession. An incident is significant climate in which the events took place. The decision taken by the executive board of Fréjus, to take an oath, in 1792 the vicar Pelloquin, serving the branch of Saint-Martin, the directors of the Guard argued that they had yet to receive the oath. What denied the people of Plan de la Tour. A bailiff was committed to signify the act. On his return, it was made known to him that "people rioted against the municipality of La Garde-Freinet and that representatives of the latter could not travel safely in Saint-Martin, to receive the oath of Abbot."

After many difficulties, the commune was officially established on 26 May 1792 by a decision of the executive board of Var serving in Brignoles. Paradoxically, it left outside its boundaries of the district Plan, which gave it its name and an integral part of Sainte-Maxime, and would not be attached later. Finally, the minutes of division and limitation of territory between the town of Plan de la Tour and La Garde-Freinet were established in 1796.

== Population ==
Historical population
Year	Pop.	±% p.a.
1968	1,036	—
1975	1,260	+2.84%
1982	1,448	+2.01%
1990	1,991	+4.06%
1999	2,380	+2.00%
2007	2,752	+1.83%
2012	2,829	+0.55%
2017	2,827	−0.01%
2023	3,125	+1.68%
Source: INSEE

== See also ==
- Communes of the Var department
