= Puerto Escondido, Baja California Sur =

Puerto Escondido
- Location in Mexico
- Coordinates: 25°48′38″N 111°18′28″W
- Country: Mexico
- State: Baja California Sur
- Municipality: Loreto Municipality
- Elevation: 0 ft (0 m)

Population (2010)
  - City: 2
  - Urban: 0

Puerto Escondido is a large natural harbor in the Mexican state of Baja California Sur. It is located in the Loreto Municipality 28 km south of Loreto, on Federal Highway 1 on the western shore of the Gulf of California.

French architect and urban planner François Spoerry designed the neighborhood of Puerto Escondido, but it was abandoned after only 3 buildings were constructed. The nearest community to Puerto Escondido is Tripui, a privately owned leasehold community, largely of ex-pat Americans and Canadians with a store, hotel and restaurant. It is about 1 kilometer from Puerto Escondido. A new residential community is being constructed on one of original artificial islands called Waicuri. The completed first phase will include 19 waterfront luxury homes, all with private docks. The first home was completed in July, 2018, and is called, "Casa Palo Blanco."

== Description ==
The main harbor is about 1.8 km long and 1 km wide with a 30 meter wide entrance and minimum 4.5 meter depth at low tide (up to 7.5 meter at high tide). It has been a popular anchorage with visiting sailors and is widely recognized as one of the best hurricane holes in the Sea of Cortez. Adjacent to the main harbor is an abandoned marina project, "the Ellipse" and seaward of the Ellipse is a large, somewhat protected area that was once an anchorage known as the "Waiting Room" for sailors and "Enfermario" to local Mexicans. The inner harbor is leased to Desarrolladora Marina Puerto Escondido, S. de R.L. de C.V. who installed a small marina and moorings for rent. There is a small boatyard, grocery store and restaurant in the marina. A privately owned marina (Marina Puerto Escondido) was opened in the fall of 2013 as a prelude to private development of properties lining the canals and a proposed additional marina in the Ellipse. The most recent change by the new owners is the installation of 80 new slips in the marina for vessels up to 220 feet.

Puerto Escondido lies within the Loreto Bay National Marine Park which became a United Nations World Heritage Site in 2005. There are 6 sizable islands and numerous smaller islands and rocky outcrops within a few miles of the port. They offer diving and snorkeling. The Sierra Gigantes are within about 2 km of Puerto Escondido with rugged canyon trails for the more adventurous hikers.
