= Les Issambres =

Village in France

Coordinates: 43.3475°N 6.7028°E

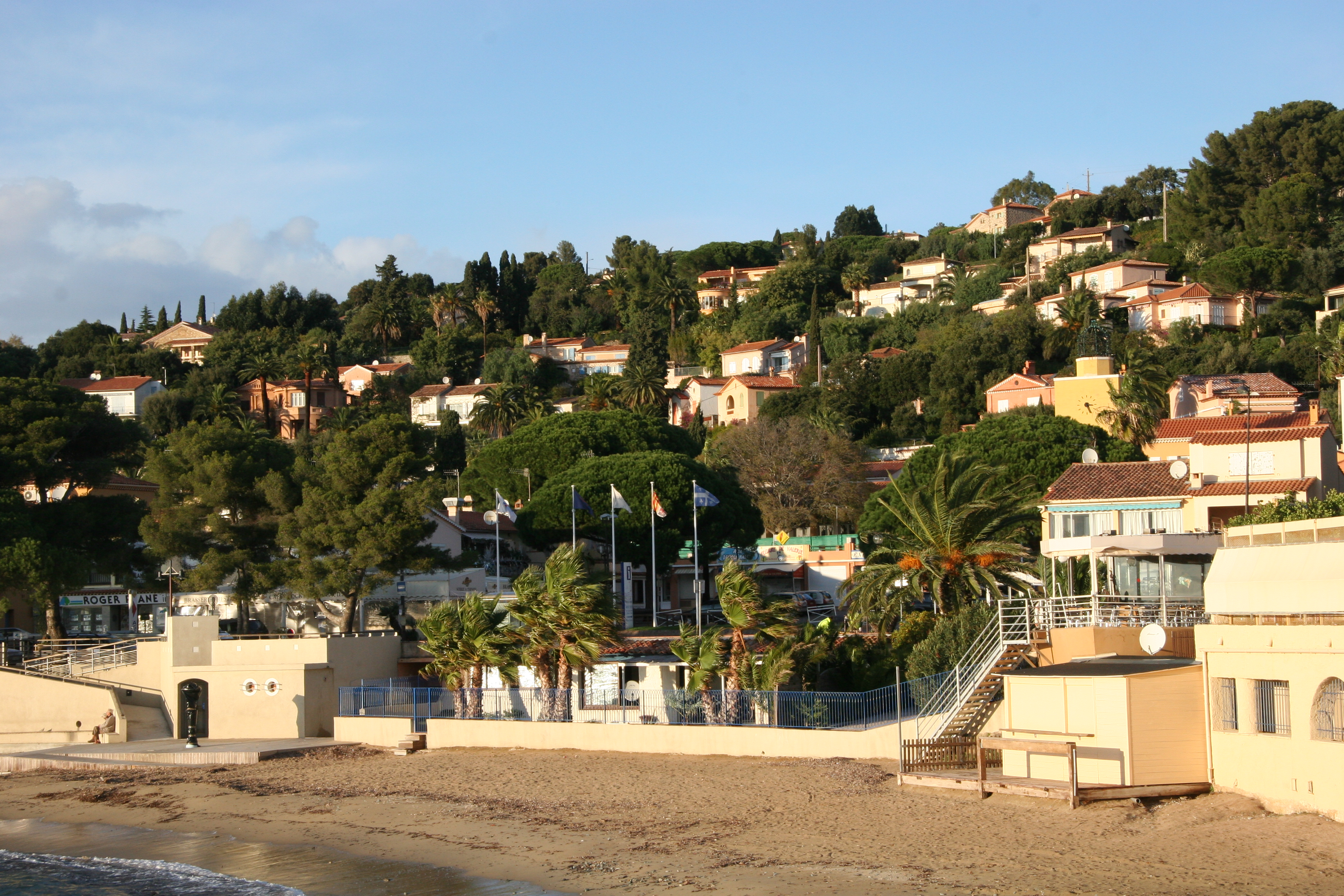
Les Issambres, village beach in San Peïre.

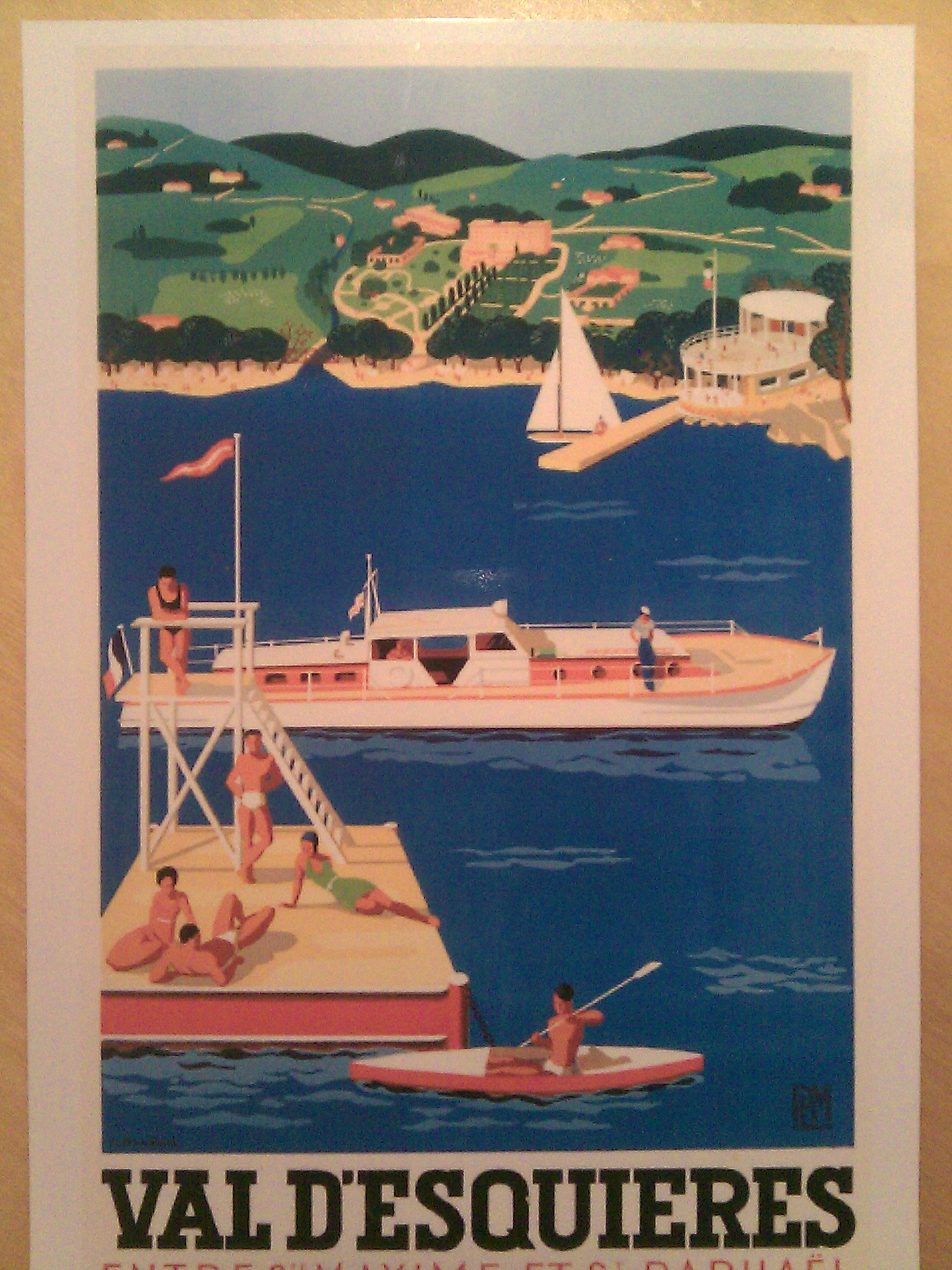
Tourist poster from the 1930s. The sailing center in the foreground and the conspicuous Hotel "La Résidence" in the background.

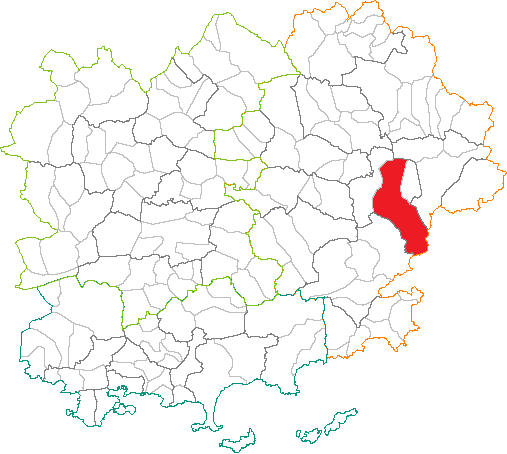
Localisation on Var's map

Les Issambres (French pronunciation: [lɛzisɑ̃bʁ(ə)]) is a French village on the coastline along the Bay of Saint Tropez, between the Mediterranean and the wooded hills of the Massif des Maures.

== History ==
This seaside and holiday destination of the commune of Roquebrune-sur-Argens, France, stretches along eight kiliometers of inlets and fine sandy beaches. Its incarnation as a resort took place in the 1930s with the development of the Hotel La Résidence (now named Hôtel club Vacanciel des Issambres) above La Garonette Beach. Clearly visible from the sea, it is located in the Val d' Esquieres, which Les Issambres shares with the commune of Sainte Maxime. Eastwards along the beach is a sailing center with boat rentals and a sailing school and protected boat harbor, with some marine shops, a dive center, and restaurants. A ferry (Les Bateaux Verts) takes passengers to the Sainte Maxime harbor or Saint Tropez.

On August 15, 1944, the beaches of Saint Tropez, Sainte Maxime, and Les Issambres were at the center of Operation Dragoon, the invasion and liberation of Southern France during World War II. A US Delta Force from 93rd Evac landed there. Near the entrance to La Garonette beach is a memorial to the landing, honoring US troops. The sailing center is named La Batterie, as it was the location of a German artillery battery.

Further to the east is the village San-Peïre sur Mer, which has grown gradually since WW2. It is really a central destination for the area, with shops, restaurants, hotels, a promenade, village beach, and town square with a Monday outdoor market, as well as postal and tourist offices. Continuing eastwards the coastline winds with creeks, rocks, and "calanques" along Saint- Aygulf (Fréjus commune). Among the numerous nature trails here, a coastal route leads to a 2,000-year-old Roman fishpond. Many private houses step up the hillsides—but virtually every building, including hotels, keeps a low profile, in contrast to the overbuilt heights in locations further east along the French Riviera.

== See also ==
- Communes of the Var department
