= Sainte-Maxime International Horror Film Festival =

- Location: Sainte-Maxime, France

The Sainte-Maxime International Horror Film Festival was an annual horror film festival held in Sainte-Maxime, France. The festival screened a variety of films within the horror, fantasy, and science fiction genres, including short films, feature films, and animated films. French competitions were free to enter, while international entries were subject to a small fee. The festival provided an opportunity for filmmakers to gain exposure.

== Featured Films ==
=== 2009 ===
- The Human Centipede, directed by Tom Six. A Dutch body horror film about tourists being kidnapped and sewn together into a centipede. It won the Prix d'Or in the Official Competition.
- Murder Set Pieces, directed by Nick Palumbo. A horror film about a serial killer photographer. It won Prix d'Or in the Midnight X-Treme Competition.
- Boob, directed by Honest. A comedy about a boob coming to life. It won the Prix d'Or in the International Short Films Competition.
- Pogo & ses amis, directed by François Guay. A French comedy. It won the Prix d'Or in the French Short Films Competition.

== Rules and Prizes ==
The Sainte-Maxime International Horror Film Festival awards prizes in three categories for screenplays: first, second, and third place. To be eligible, screenplays must be under 25 pages. The evaluation process is conducted by a panel of judges, including industry professionals and experienced filmmakers.

=== Entry Requirements ===
- Length: Screenplays must not exceed 25 pages.
- Format: Submissions should adhere to standard screenplay formatting guidelines.
- Language: Submissions can be in any language, but non-French screenplays must be accompanied by an English or French translation.
- Fees: While all French competitions are free to enter, international competitions require a small entry fee.

=== Prizes ===
- First Place: The winner receives a monetary award, a listing on the festival's official website, and VIP passes to other international film festivals. Additionally, the first-place screenplay will be featured in a special segment during the festival.
- Second Place: The runner-up receives a smaller monetary award and a listing on the festival's website. The second-place winner also receives VIP passes to selected film festivals.
- Third Place: The third-place winner receives a listing on the festival's website and VIP passes to selected film festivals.

=== Additional Opportunities ===
- Top Ten Finalists: The screenplays that make it to the top ten will have the opportunity to be requested by producers. These finalists will also receive certificates of achievement and have their work highlighted in the festival's promotional materials.
- Workshops and Panels: All participants, including those who did not place in the top three, are invited to attend workshops and panels hosted by industry experts. These sessions cover topics such as screenwriting, film production, and distribution strategies.
- Networking Events: The festival organizes networking events where participants can meet with producers, directors, and other filmmakers. These events provide a platform for emerging writers to pitch their ideas and projects.

The Sainte-Maxime International Horror Film Festival aims to support and promote new talent in the horror, fantasy, and science fiction genres, providing a platform for filmmakers and writers to showcase their work and connect with industry professionals.
