= Cavalaire-sur-Mer =

Cavalaire-sur-Mer Cavalaira de Mar (Occitan)
- Commune
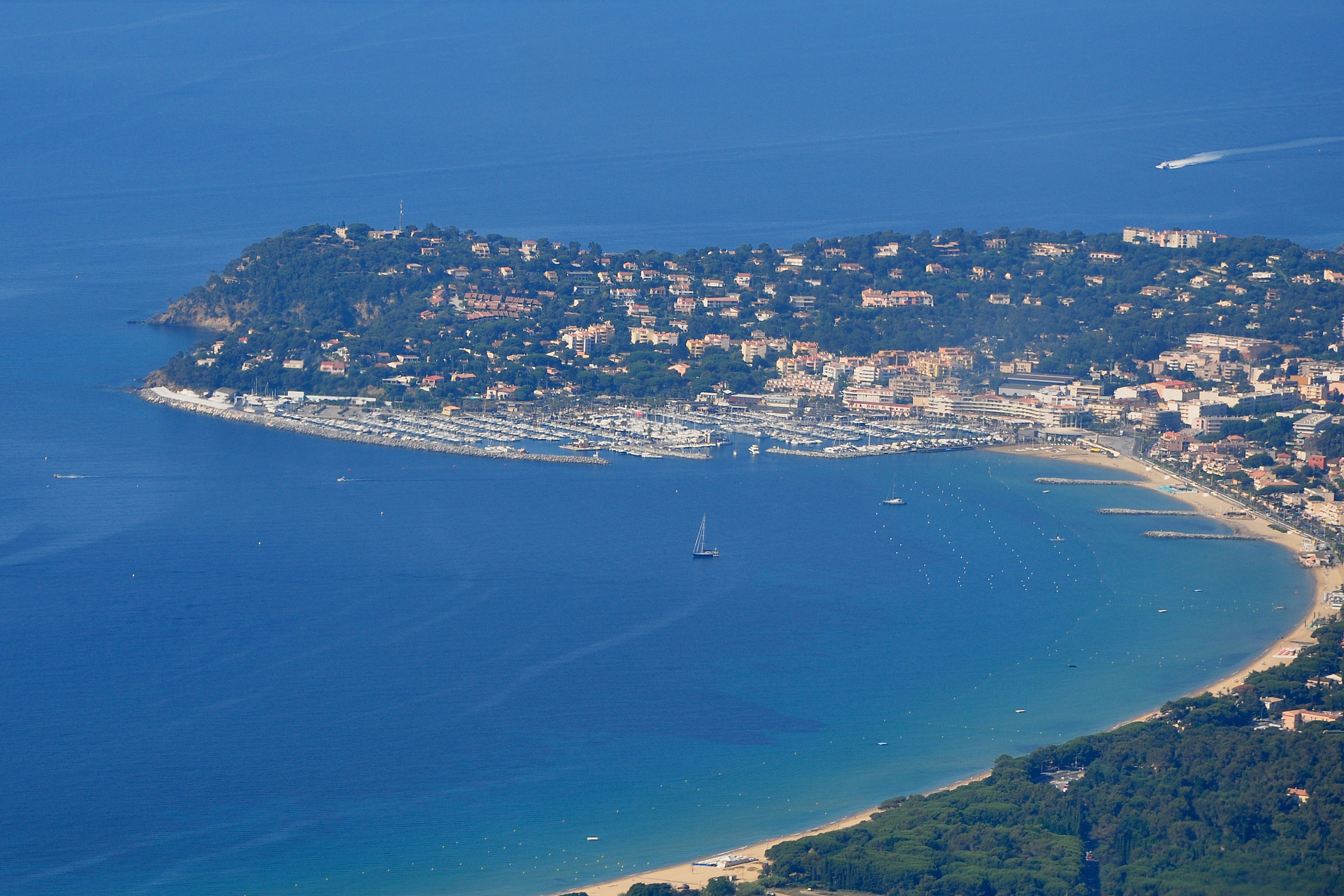
- An aerial view (from the east) of the bay and harbour of Cavalaire-sur-Mer

- Coat of arms
- Location of Cavalaire-sur-Mer
- Location within France Location within Provence-Alpes-Côte d'Azur
- Coordinates: 43°10′19″N 6°31′47″E
- Country: France
- Region: Provence-Alpes-Côte d'Azur
- Department: Var
- Arrondissement: Draguignan
- Canton: Sainte-Maxime
- Intercommunality: Communauté de communes Méditerranée Porte des Maures

Government
  - Mayor (2020–2026): Philippe Leonelli (DVD)
- Area^{1}: 16.74 km^{2} (6.46 sq mi)
- Elevation: 150 m (490 ft)
- Highest elevation: 528 m (1,732 ft)
- Lowest elevation: 0 m (0 ft)
- Population (2023): 8,121
  - Density: 485.1/km^{2} (1,256/sq mi)
- Time zone: UTC+01:00 (CET)
  - Summer (DST): UTC+02:00 (CEST)
- INSEE/Postal code: 83036 /83240
- ^{1} French Land Register data, which excludes lakes, ponds, glaciers > 1 km^{2} (0.386 sq mi or 247 acres) and river estuaries.

Cavalaire-sur-Mer (pronounced [kavalɛʁ syʁ mɛʁ], literally Cavalaire on Sea; Provençal: Cavalaira de Mar or si Cavalaira) often known as Cavalaire is a resort town in the Var department in the Provence-Alpes-Côte d'Azur region, southeastern France.

== History ==
Cavalaire-sur-Mer is probably derived from an ancient Phoenician colony of the name of Heraclea Caccabaria. There are also remains of a Gallo-Roman occupation in Pardigon.

The town was detached from Gassin in 1929.

It is located on the route of the old railway Saint Raphael–Toulon (sometimes called Train Pignes), now defunct. The old railway line can still be seen throughout the town, with the old station situated near the harbour and now hosting a museum.

During World War II, on August 16, 1944, it was one of the sites of a beach landing in Operation Dragoon, the Allied invasion of southern France. Every year, August 15 sees a parade of military vehicles and the reconstruction of a military camp.

Its sister city is New Port Richey, Florida in the United States.

== Population ==
Historical population
Year	Pop.	±% p.a.
1968	2,116	—
1975	2,710	+3.60%
1982	3,912	+5.38%
1990	4,188	+0.86%
1999	5,237	+2.51%
2007	6,509	+2.76%
2012	7,062	+1.64%
2017	7,385	+0.90%
2023	8,121	+1.60%
Source: INSEE

== See also ==
- Communes of the Var department
