= Canton of Sainte-Maxime =

Canton of Var department, France

Coordinates: 43.31°N 6.64°E

The canton of Sainte-Maxime is an administrative division of the Var department, southeastern France. It was created at the French canton reorganisation which came into effect in March 2015. Its seat is in Sainte-Maxime.

It consists of the following communes:

1. Cavalaire-sur-Mer
2. Cogolin
3. La Croix-Valmer
4. Gassin
5. Grimaud
6. La Môle
7. Le Plan-de-la-Tour
8. Ramatuelle
9. Saint-Tropez
10. Sainte-Maxime
