= La Môle =

La Mole
- Commune
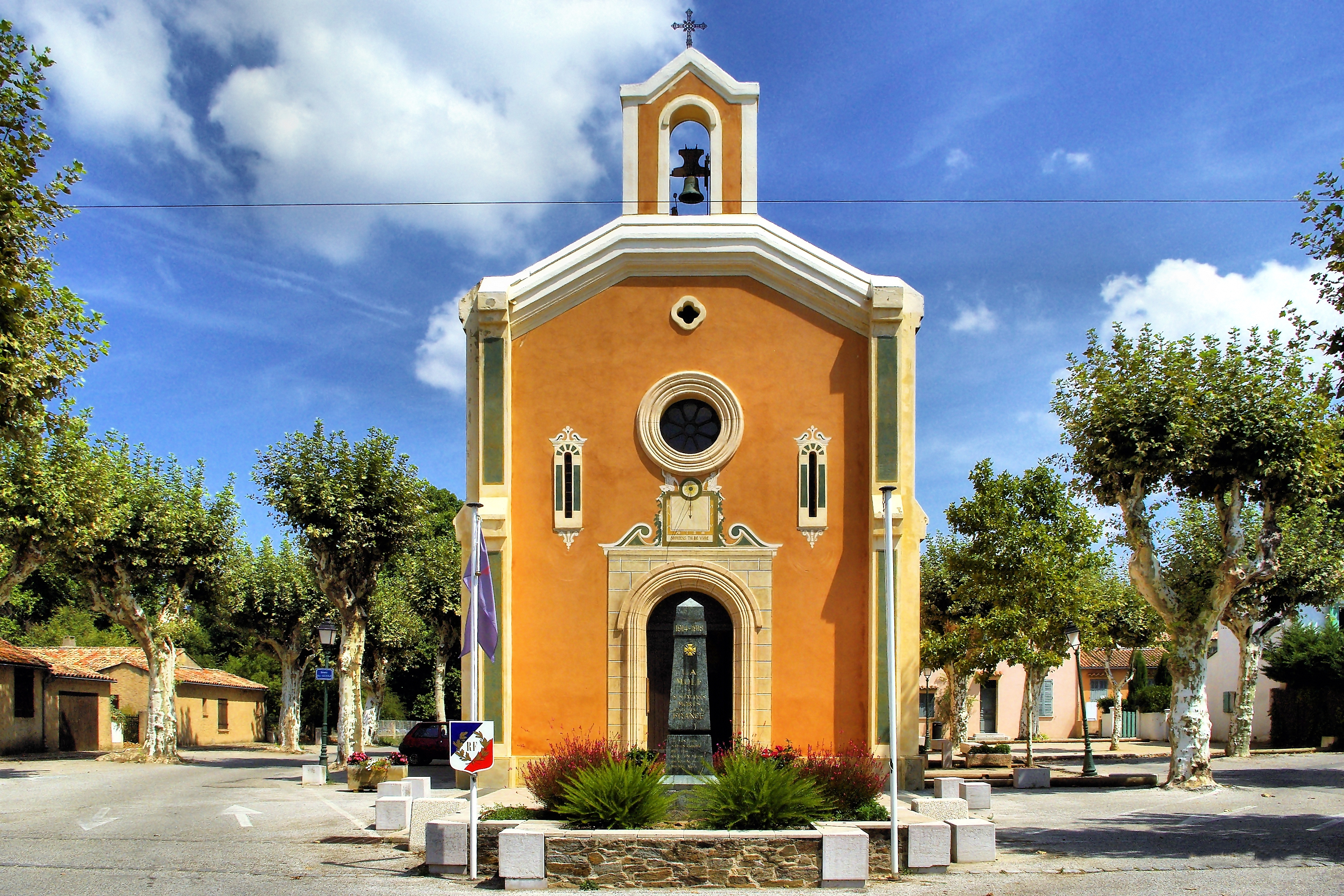
- The church of Sainte Marie-Madeleine, in La Mole

- Coat of arms
- Location of La Mole
- Location within France Location within Provence-Alpes-Côte d'Azur
- Coordinates: 43°12′33″N 6°27′58″E
- Country: France
- Region: Provence-Alpes-Côte d'Azur
- Department: Var
- Arrondissement: Draguignan
- Canton: Sainte-Maxime
- Intercommunality: Communauté de communes Méditerranée Porte des Maures

Government
  - Mayor (2022–2026): Sophie Bardollet (Independent)
- Area^{1}: 45.28 km^{2} (17.48 sq mi)
- Elevation: 25 m (82 ft)
- Highest elevation: 529 m (1,736 ft)
- Lowest elevation: 15 m (49 ft)
- Population (2023): 1,535
  - Density: 33.90/km^{2} (87.80/sq mi)
- Time zone: UTC+01:00 (CET)
  - Summer (DST): UTC+02:00 (CEST)
- INSEE/Postal code: 83079 /83310
- ^{1} French Land Register data, which excludes lakes, ponds, glaciers > 1 km^{2} (0.386 sq mi or 247 acres) and river estuaries.

La Mole (French pronunciation: [la mol]; Occitan: La Mòla) is a commune in the Var department in the Provence-Alpes-Côte d'Azur region in southeastern France.

== See also ==
- Communes of the Var department
