= Port Grimaud =

Town in France

Coordinates: 43°16′20″N 6°34′49″E

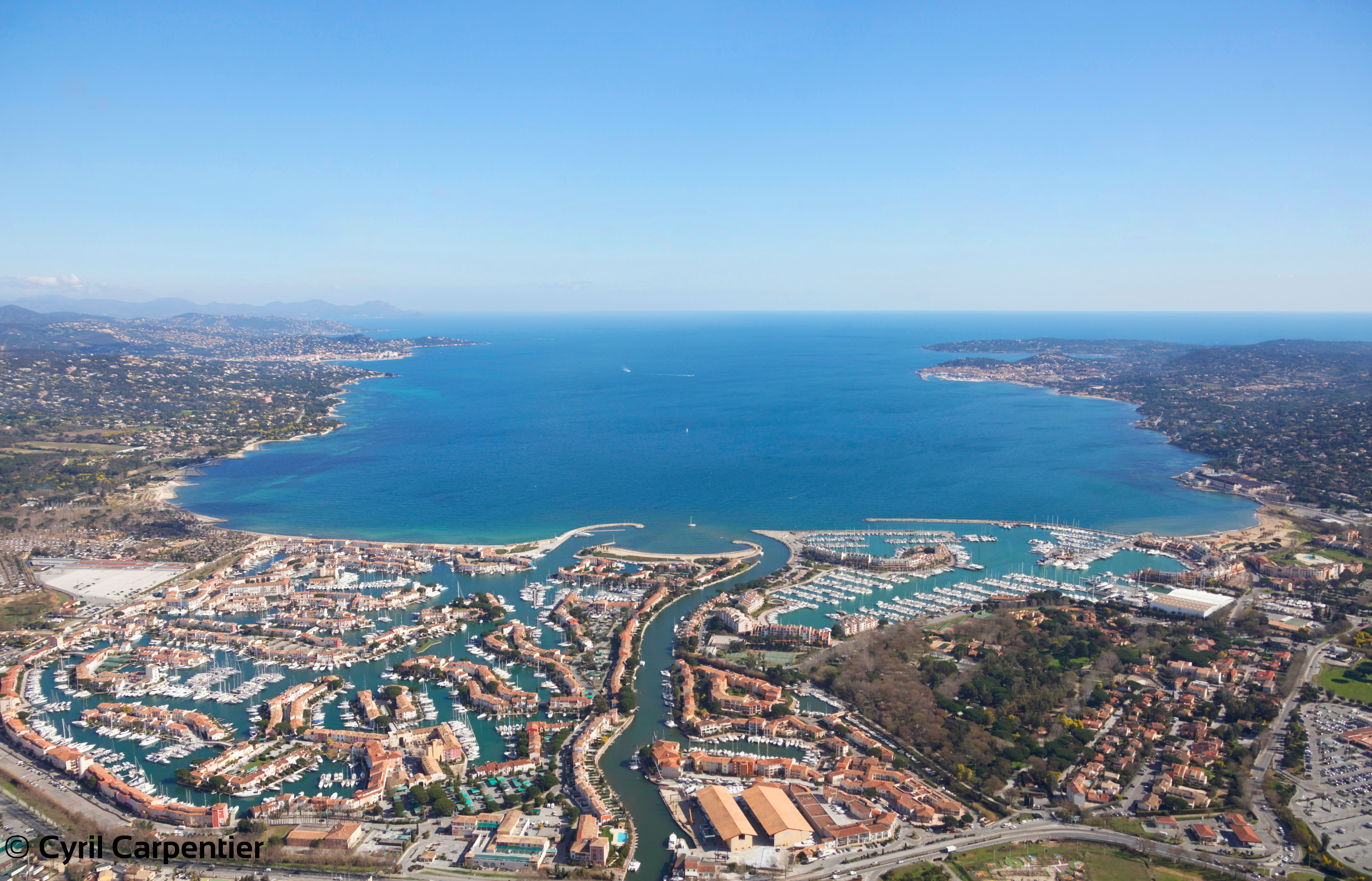
Aerial view of Port Grimaud

Port Grimaud is a seaside town that forms part of the commune of Grimaud in the Var department of the Provence-Alpes-Côte d'Azur region in southeastern France. It is located seven km (4.3 miles) (four mi (6.4 km)) west of Saint-Tropez and seven km (4.3 miles) southwest of Sainte-Maxime. This seaside town was created by architect François Spoerry in the 1960s by modifying the marshes of the river Giscle on the bay of Saint-Tropez. Built with channels in a Venetian manner, but with French "fisherman"-style houses resembling those in Saint-Tropez, Spoerry called his style L'architecture douce.

The town is also known as the "Venice of Provence".

The mostly traffic-free town is popular with boat owners, as most properties include their own berth. The success of the first phase of the development meant that Port Grimaud 2 (extending the town further east) was completed in the 1970s and Port Grimaud 3 in the 1990s.

The local church, the L'eglise œcuménique Saint-François d’Assise (the Ecumenical Church of St Francis of Assisi) in the Place de L'église (Church Square), was also designed by Spoerry and contains stained glass by Victor Vasarely.
