= Cogolin =

- Commune
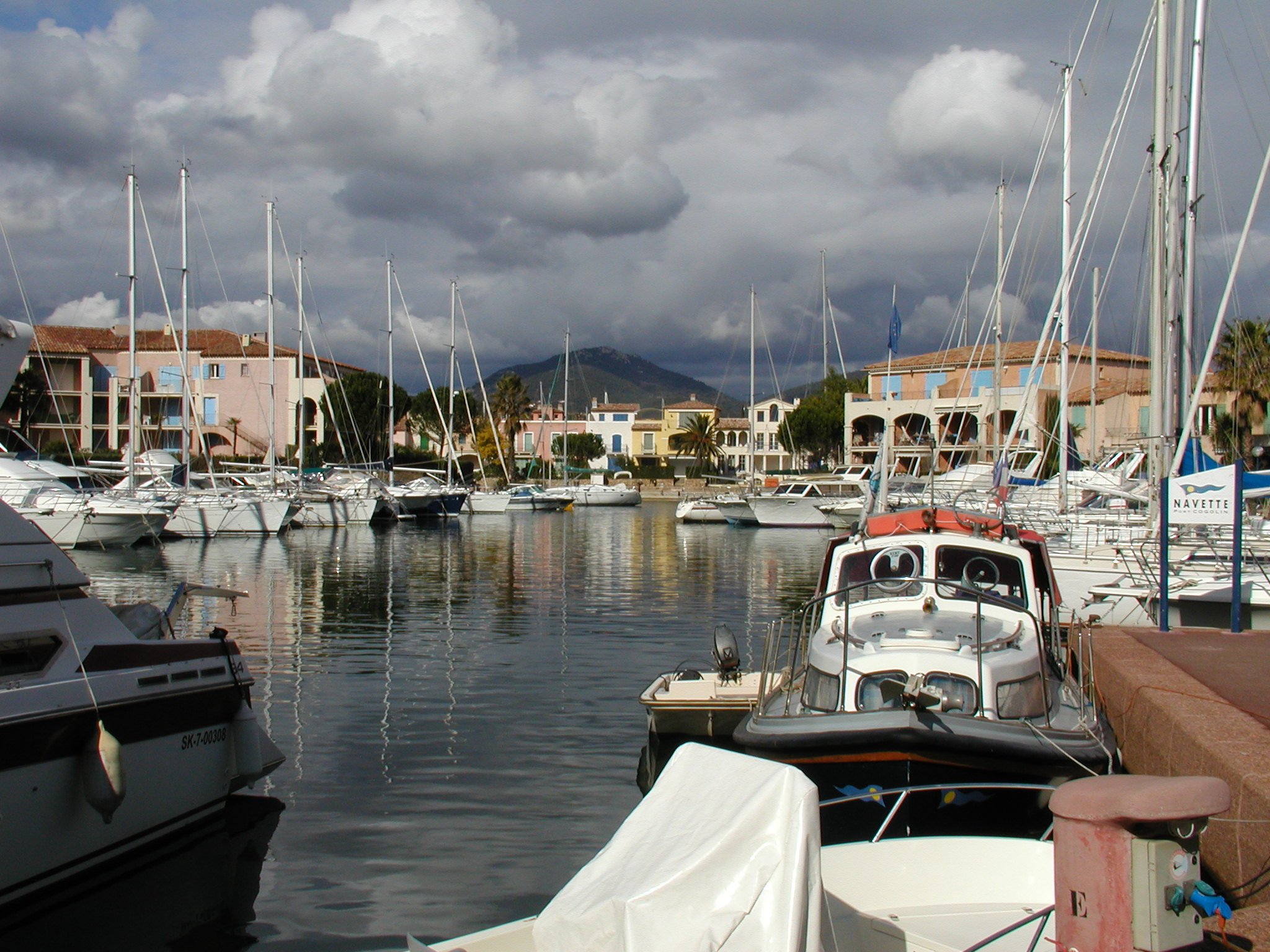
- A view of the harbour of Cogolin

- Coat of arms
- Location of Cogolin
- Location within France Location within Provence-Alpes-Côte d'Azur
- Coordinates: 43°15′09″N 6°31′48″E
- Country: France
- Region: Provence-Alpes-Côte d'Azur
- Department: Var
- Arrondissement: Draguignan
- Canton: Sainte-Maxime
- Intercommunality: Communauté de communes Méditerranée Porte des Maures

Government
  - Mayor (2020–2026): Marc-Étienne Lansade (DVD)
- Area^{1}: 27.93 km^{2} (10.78 sq mi)
- Highest elevation: 390 m (1,280 ft)
- Lowest elevation: 0 m (0 ft)
- Population (2023): 12,301
  - Density: 440.4/km^{2} (1,141/sq mi)
- Time zone: UTC+01:00 (CET)
  - Summer (DST): UTC+02:00 (CEST)
- INSEE/Postal code: 83042 /83310
- ^{1} French Land Register data, which excludes lakes, ponds, glaciers > 1 km^{2} (0.386 sq mi or 247 acres) and river estuaries.

Cogolin (French pronunciation: [kɔɡɔlɛ̃]) is a commune in the Var department in the Provence-Alpes-Côte d'Azur region in southeastern France.

== Geography ==
=== Climate ===
Cogolin has a hot-summer Mediterranean climate (Köppen climate classification Csa). The average annual temperature in Cogolin is 15.6 °C (60.1 °F). The average annual rainfall is 958.0 mm (37.72 in) with November as the wettest month. The temperatures are highest on average in August, at around 24.3 °C (75.7 °F), and lowest in January, at around 8.1 °C (46.6 °F). The highest temperature ever recorded in Cogolin was 42.0 °C (107.6 °F) on 22 August 2023; the coldest temperature ever recorded was −9.5 °C (14.9 °F) on 30 December 2005.

Climate data for Cogolin (1991−2020 normals, extremes 1997−present)
Month	Jan	Feb	Mar	Apr	May	Jun	Jul	Aug	Sep	Oct	Nov	Dec	Year
Record high °C (°F)	22.4 (72.3)	26.4 (79.5)	27.1 (80.8)	29.4 (84.9)	35.2 (95.4)	40.8 (105.4)	40.3 (104.5)	42.0 (107.6)	35.5 (95.9)	33.3 (91.9)	27.4 (81.3)	23.4 (74.1)	42.0 (107.6)
Mean daily maximum °C (°F)	13.6 (56.5)	14.4 (57.9)	17.3 (63.1)	20.2 (68.4)	24.3 (75.7)	29.1 (84.4)	32.0 (89.6)	32.2 (90.0)	27.6 (81.7)	22.5 (72.5)	17.2 (63.0)	14.1 (57.4)	22.0 (71.6)
Daily mean °C (°F)	8.1 (46.6)	8.5 (47.3)	11.1 (52.0)	13.9 (57.0)	17.6 (63.7)	21.7 (71.1)	24.3 (75.7)	24.3 (75.7)	20.5 (68.9)	16.6 (61.9)	11.9 (53.4)	8.9 (48.0)	15.6 (60.1)
Mean daily minimum °C (°F)	2.7 (36.9)	2.5 (36.5)	4.8 (40.6)	7.5 (45.5)	10.9 (51.6)	14.3 (57.7)	16.5 (61.7)	16.4 (61.5)	13.3 (55.9)	10.8 (51.4)	6.5 (43.7)	3.7 (38.7)	9.2 (48.6)
Record low °C (°F)	−8.5 (16.7)	−8.3 (17.1)	−7.7 (18.1)	−2.8 (27.0)	3.1 (37.6)	4.8 (40.6)	8.2 (46.8)	7.7 (45.9)	4.4 (39.9)	−2.7 (27.1)	−7.4 (18.7)	−9.5 (14.9)	−9.5 (14.9)
Average precipitation mm (inches)	95.9 (3.78)	76.1 (3.00)	70.2 (2.76)	82.1 (3.23)	58.7 (2.31)	32.2 (1.27)	13.9 (0.55)	20.6 (0.81)	73.8 (2.91)	135.6 (5.34)	177.5 (6.99)	121.4 (4.78)	958.0 (37.72)
Average precipitation days (≥ 1.0 mm)	6.4	6.0	5.7	6.7	5.1	2.6	1.1	2.0	4.1	7.2	8.9	7.1	63.0
Source: Météo-France

== Population ==
Historical population
Year	Pop.	±% p.a.
1968	3,292	—
1975	4,577	+4.82%
1982	5,639	+3.03%
1990	7,976	+4.43%
1999	9,079	+1.45%
2007	11,131	+2.58%
2012	11,186	+0.10%
2017	11,736	+0.96%
2023	12,301	+0.79%
Source: INSEE

== See also ==
- Communes of the Var department
