= Gassin =

- Commune
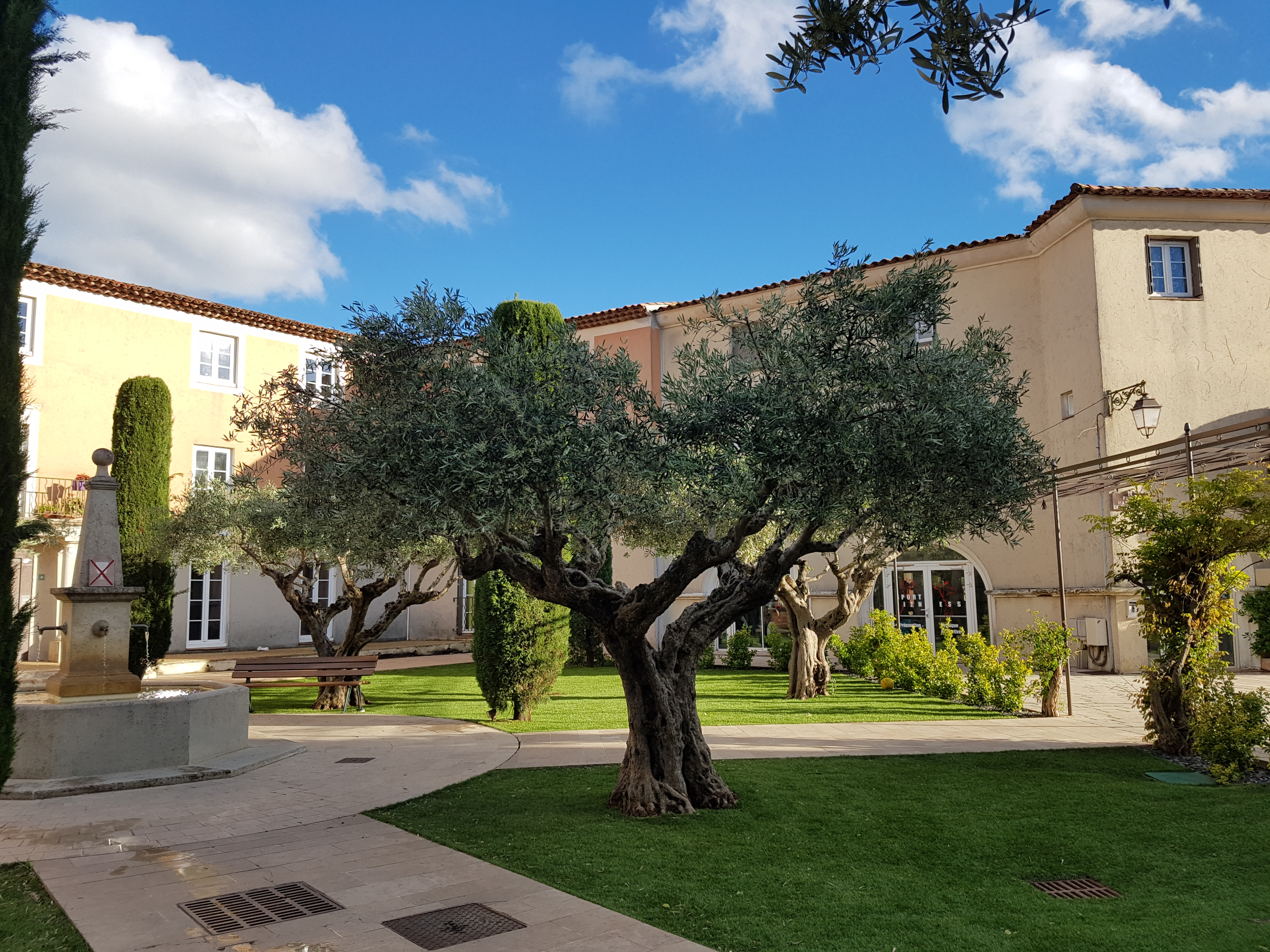
- A view within the village of Gassin

- Coat of arms
- Location of Gassin
- Location within France Location within Provence-Alpes-Côte d'Azur
- Coordinates: 43°13′47″N 6°35′09″E
- Country: France
- Region: Provence-Alpes-Côte d'Azur
- Department: Var
- Arrondissement: Draguignan
- Canton: Sainte-Maxime
- Intercommunality: CC du golfe de Saint-Tropez

Government
  - Mayor (2020–2026): Anne-Marie Waniart (DVD)
- Area^{1}: 24.74 km^{2} (9.55 sq mi)
- Highest elevation: 324 m (1,063 ft)
- Lowest elevation: 0 m (0 ft)
- Population (2023): 2,687
  - Density: 108.6/km^{2} (281.3/sq mi)
- Demonym: French: Gassinois
- Time zone: UTC+01:00 (CET)
  - Summer (DST): UTC+02:00 (CEST)
- INSEE/Postal code: 83065 /83580
- ^{1} French Land Register data, which excludes lakes, ponds, glaciers > 1 km^{2} (0.386 sq mi or 247 acres) and river estuaries.

Gassin (French pronunciation: [ɡasɛ̃]) is a commune in the Var department in the Provence-Alpes-Côte d'Azur region in southeastern France. It is a member of Les Plus Beaux Villages de France (The Most Beautiful Villages of France) Association.

It is located very near to the holiday destination of Saint-Tropez. Perched high up on a rock, it is less than 4 km (2.5 mi) from the sea. Many Tropezian tourists who are attracted by a more affordable life prefer to stay in Gassin and enjoy the same kind of "Cote d'Azur" life.

It lies 2 kilometres from route D559 which links Hyères (41 km) and Sainte-Maxime (12 km).

== Population ==
Historical population
Year	Pop.	±% p.a.
1968	1,107	—
1975	1,519	+4.62%
1982	2,017	+4.13%
1990	2,622	+3.33%
1999	2,710	+0.37%
2007	2,899	+0.85%
2012	2,818	−0.57%
2017	2,560	−1.90%
2023	2,687	+0.81%
Source: INSEE

== Historic sites ==
- The ramparts (protecting walls that surround the city)
- The rectory
- The chapel Notre Dame de la Compassion
- L'Androuno, one of the world's narrowest streets

== Notable people ==
- Emmanuelle Béart, French actress.
- Sarah Biasini, French actress, daughter of Romy Schneider
- Inès de la Fressange, designer of fashion and perfumes
- Mary Jayne Gold, American heiress who helped key figures escape Occupied France
- David Ginola, ex-footballer and pundit
- Sacha Opinel, ex-footballer
- Arthur Rinderknech, tennis player
- Igor Wakhévitch, avant-garde composer
- Eliesse Ben Seghir, footballer playing for Bayer 04 Leverkusen

== Activities ==
- Walks
- Varied water sports
- An 18-hole golf course
- A polo field and polo club
- The oldest art gallery in the area, Galerie deï Barri

== See also ==
- Communes of the Var department
