= Grimaud, Var =

Grimaud
- Commune
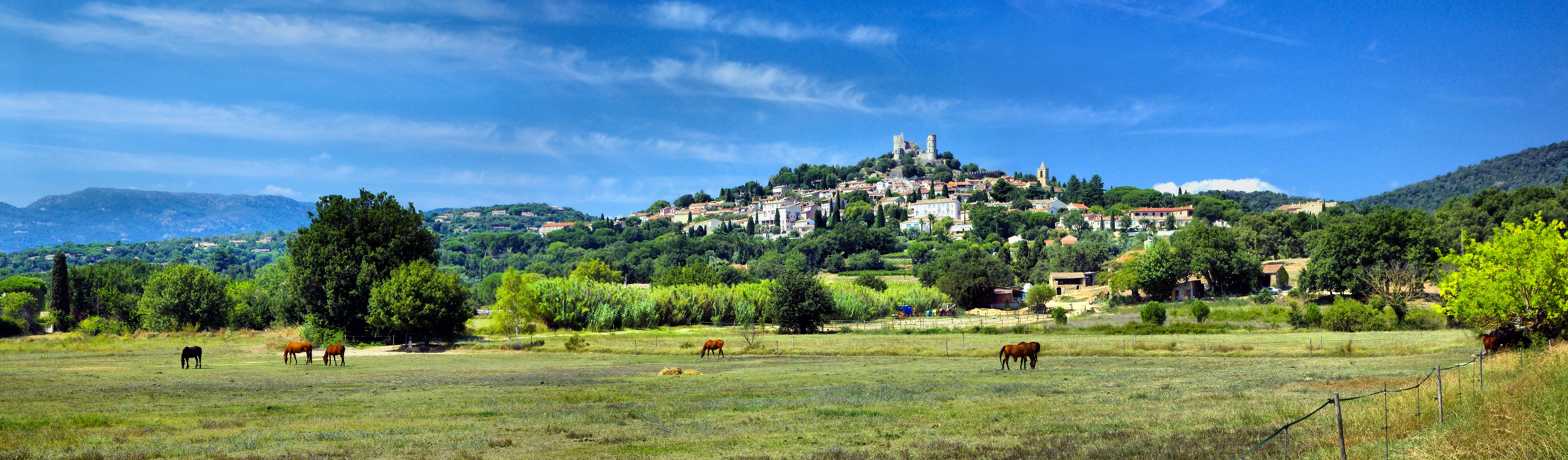
- Grimaud Village

- Coat of arms
- Location of Grimaud
- Location within France Location within Provence-Alpes-Côte d'Azur
- Coordinates: 43°16′27″N 6°31′20″E
- Country: France
- Region: Provence-Alpes-Côte d'Azur
- Department: Var
- Arrondissement: Draguignan
- Canton: Sainte-Maxime
- Intercommunality: Communauté de communes Méditerranée Porte des Maures

Government
  - Mayor (2020–2026): Alain Benedetto (LR)
- Area^{1}: 44.58 km^{2} (17.21 sq mi)
- Elevation: 102 m (335 ft)
- Highest elevation: 503 m (1,650 ft)
- Lowest elevation: 0 m (0 ft)
- Population (2023): 4,587
  - Density: 102.9/km^{2} (266.5/sq mi)
- Time zone: UTC+01:00 (CET)
  - Summer (DST): UTC+02:00 (CEST)
- INSEE/Postal code: 83068 /83310
- Website: www.mairie-grimaud.fr
- ^{1} French Land Register data, which excludes lakes, ponds, glaciers > 1 km^{2} (0.386 sq mi or 247 acres) and river estuaries.

Grimaud (French pronunciation: [ɡʁimo]) is a village and commune in the Var department in the Provence-Alpes-Côte d'Azur region in southeastern France.

It is located on the French Riviera. The village of Grimaud is a perched village, with historical links to the Grimaldi family. Gibelin de Grimaldi aided William the Good in driving the Saracens of Fraxinet out of the area in AD 973 and was rewarded with the land. The village is dominated by its 11th-century castle (partially restored).

The Gulf of Saint Tropez was known as the Gulf of Grimaud until the end of the 19th century. The seaside town of Port Grimaud lies within the commune, at the head of the gulf.

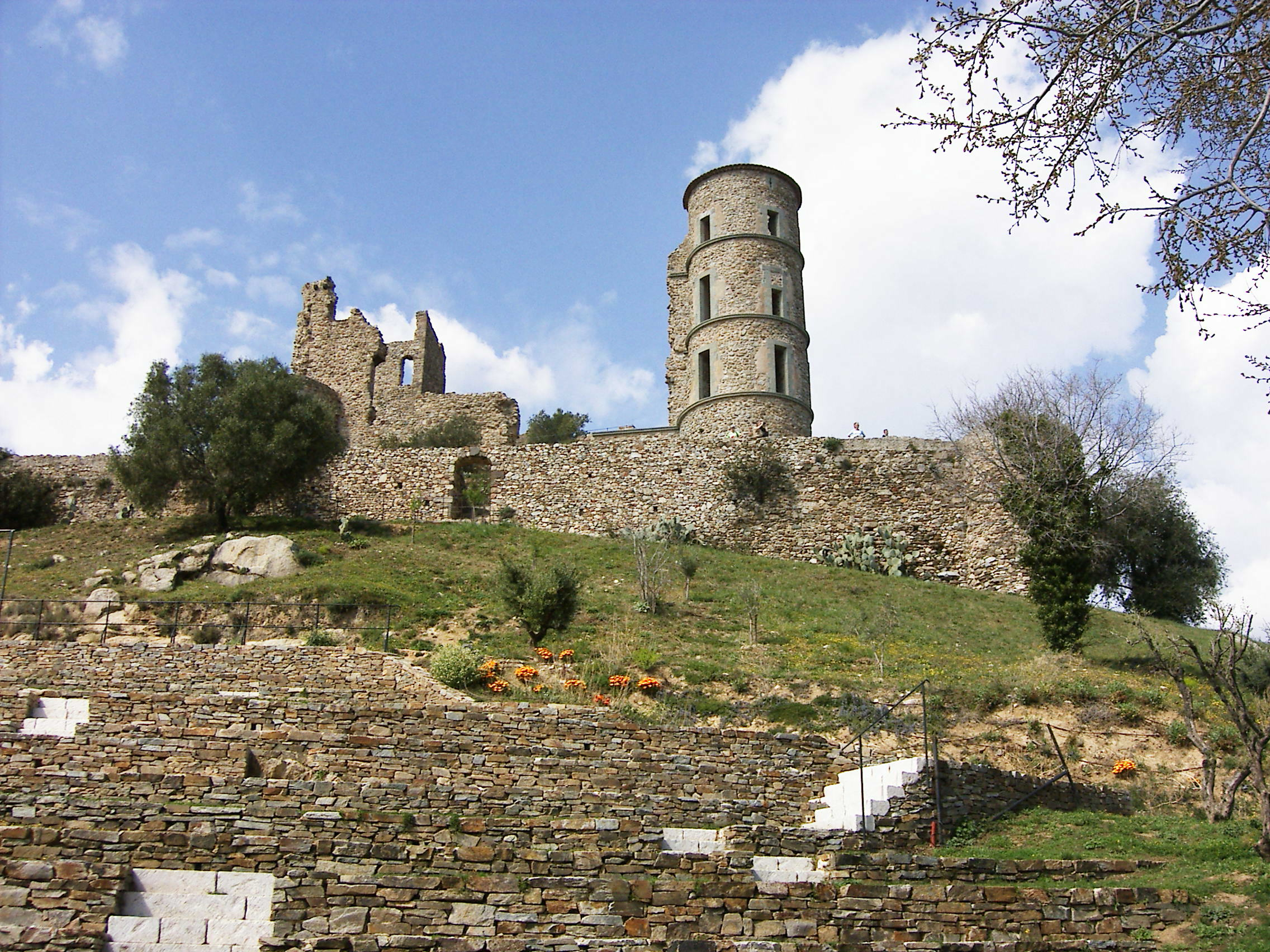
Castle ruins

== Population ==
Historical population
Year	Pop.	±% p.a.
1968	1,672	—
1975	2,408	+5.35%
1982	2,910	+2.74%
1990	3,322	+1.67%
1999	3,780	+1.45%
2007	4,233	+1.42%
2012	4,041	−0.92%
2017	4,541	+2.36%
2023	4,587	+0.17%
Source: INSEE

== Notable people ==
- Michel Darluc (1717–1783), doctor and naturalist, was born in Grimaud
- Henri Desgrange (1865–1940), bicycle racer, sports journalist and the first organiser of the Tour de France, died in Grimaud
- Laurent Voulzy (1948), for his famous song « Grimaud » in 1979.

== See also ==
- Communes of the Var department
