= Sainte-Maxime =

Sainte-Maxime Santa Maxima (Occitan)
- Commune
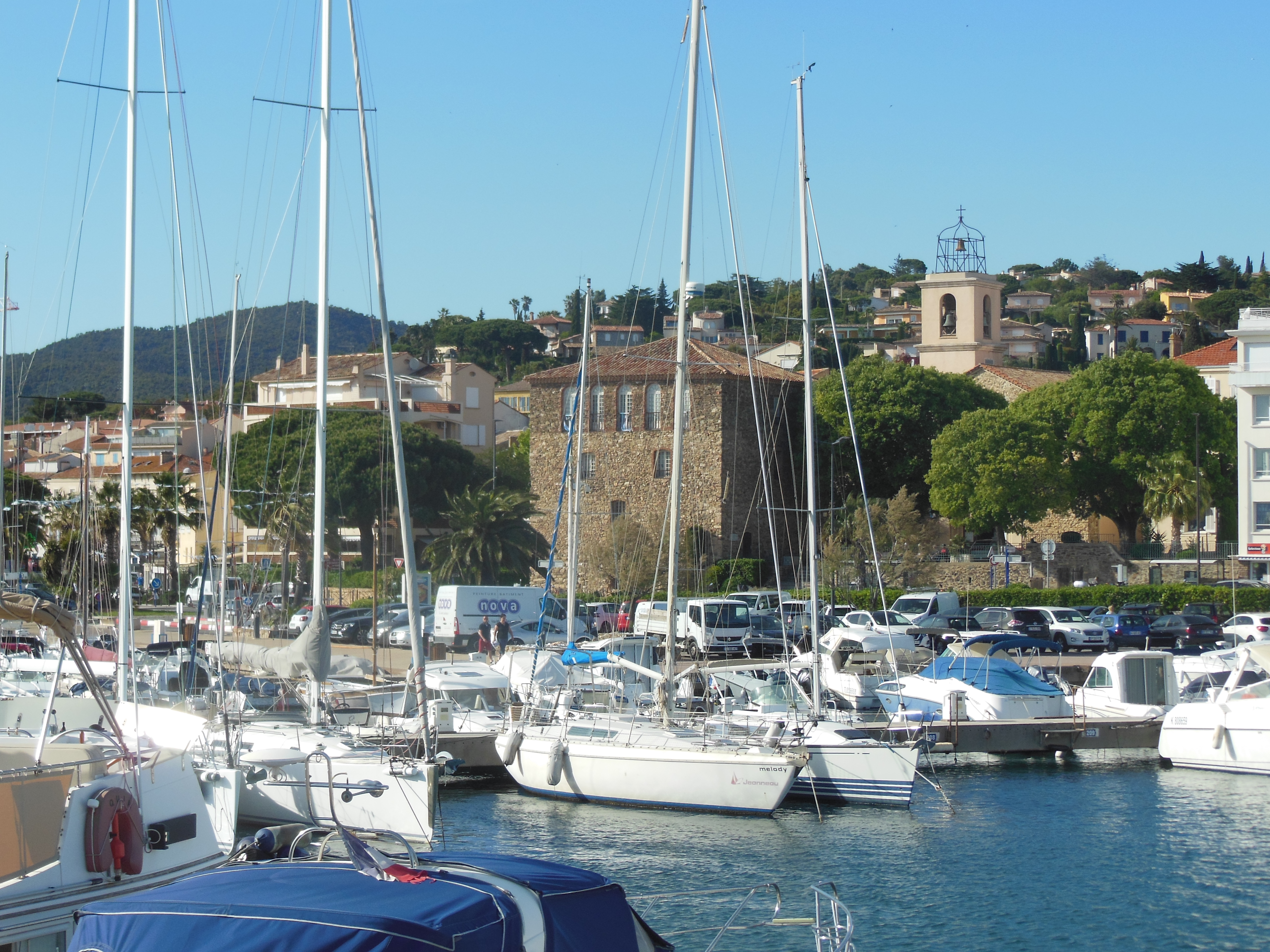
- Sainte-Maxime marina with the Tour Carrée in the background

- Coat of arms
- Location of Sainte-Maxime
- Location within France Location within Provence-Alpes-Côte d'Azur
- Coordinates: 43°18′32″N 6°38′06″E
- Country: France
- Region: Provence-Alpes-Côte d'Azur
- Department: Var
- Arrondissement: Draguignan
- Canton: Sainte-Maxime
- Intercommunality: Communauté de communes Méditerranée Porte des Maures

Government
  - Mayor (2020–2026): Vincent Morisse (LR)
- Area^{1}: 81.61 km^{2} (31.51 sq mi)
- Highest elevation: 532 m (1,745 ft)
- Lowest elevation: 0 m (0 ft)
- Population (2023): 14,118
  - Density: 173.0/km^{2} (448.1/sq mi)
- Time zone: UTC+01:00 (CET)
  - Summer (DST): UTC+02:00 (CEST)
- INSEE/Postal code: 83115 /83120
- ^{1} French Land Register data, which excludes lakes, ponds, glaciers > 1 km^{2} (0.386 sq mi or 247 acres) and river estuaries.

Sainte-Maxime (pronounced [sɛ̃t maksim]; Occitan and Provençal: Santa Maxima) is a Resort town in the Var department of the Provence-Alpes-Côte d'Azur region in Southeastern France. It is located on the French Riviera (Côte d'Azur), 90 km (56 mi) west from Nice and 130 km (81 mi) east from Marseille. Its inhabitants are called Maximois or Maximoises in French.

== Geography ==
The town faces southward on the northern shore of the Gulf of Saint-Tropez. In the north the Massif des Maures mountain range protects it from the cold winds of the mistral. It is the seat of the canton of Sainte-Maxime.

== History ==
=== Early history ===
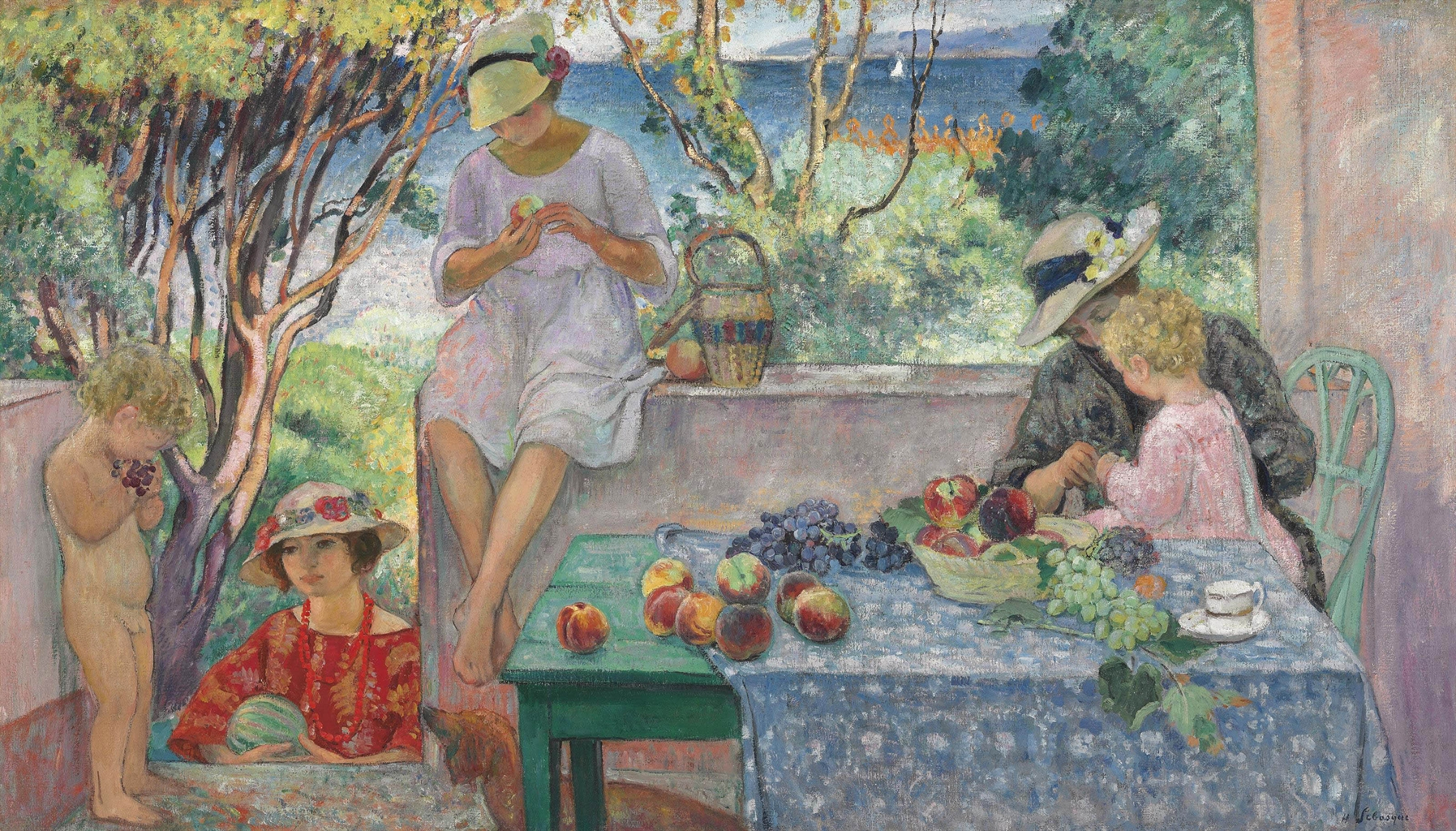
Le goûter sur la terrasse à Sainte-Maxime by Henri Lebasque

Sainte-Maxime was founded around 1000 AD by monks from the Lérins Islands outside Cannes. They built a monastery and named the village after Saint Maxime. Fishing was the economic mainstay for the inhabitants but during the early 19th century increasing amounts of lumber, cork, olive oil and wine were shipped to Marseille and Italy.

The village grew and in the 20th century began to attract artists, poets and writers who enjoyed the climate, beautiful surroundings and azure blue water. In front of the old town is the characteristic tower, La Tour Carrée, built by the monks in the early 16th century to protect the village from invaders. With an addition of a battery of cannons and with the Tour du Portalet in Saint-Tropez the whole bay was protected. As late as in the beginning of the 19th century, Napoleon ordered a restoration of the battery while also adding cannons on the Lérins Islands. The tower is now a museum.

=== World War II ===
On 15 August 1944, the beach of Sainte-Maxime was at the centre of Operation Dragoon, the invasion and liberation of Southern France during World War II. "Attack Force Delta", based around the 45th Division, landed at Sainte-Maxime. After fierce house-to-house fighting the Germans were defeated and eventually surrendered. By the foot of the Harbour pier and by La Garonette beach in the far east of the commune, memorials at the respective landing places honour the United States troops. At La Garonette beach, but formally in Les Issambres (Roquebrune-sur-Argens commune), the sailing centre is named La Batterie, as it was the location of a German artillery battery.

== Population ==
Historical population
Year	Pop.	±% p.a.
1968	5,436	—
1975	6,627	+2.87%
1982	7,364	+1.52%
1990	10,015	+3.92%
1999	11,785	+1.82%
2007	13,619	+1.82%
2012	13,736	+0.17%
2017	13,968	+0.34%
2023	14,118	+0.18%
Source: INSEE

== Economy ==
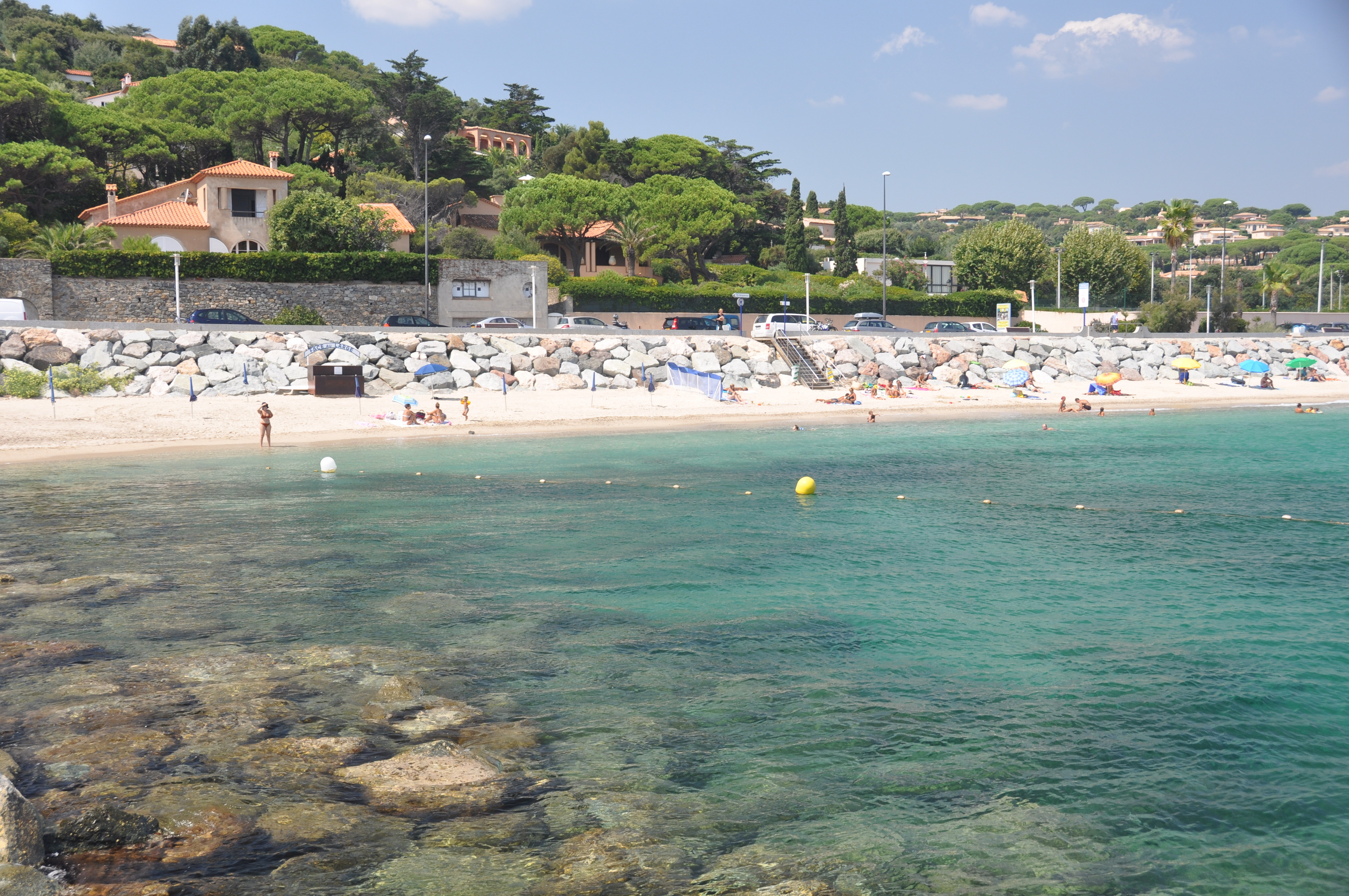
Avenue Raoul Nordling

Tourism is the largest source of revenue for Sainte-Maxime nowadays, but the town remains lively all year round. There is the old town with shops, markets, restaurants, bars and cafés, opposite the harbour. On the pier are marine shops and an upscale restaurant, and also fast boat transportation with Les Bateaux Verts to Les Issambres, St Tropez and Port Grimaud. There is a shoreline promenade with parks, pine trees, boulodrome Prince Bertil, the tourist office and the city beaches, as well as a casino with its own piece of white sand.

In addition to the city beaches, there are the Blue Flag-certified supervised ones. On the west side, The Croisette has a sailing school. On the east side of the town are La Nartelle, La Plage des Eléphants and La Garonette (also called Val D'Esquieres), which all provide water-skiing and jet-skiing activities. In addition, there are several smaller beaches that are unsupervised, for a total of 10 km of publicly accessible shoreline. There are eight golf courses within a 30 minute radius by car.

== Notable people ==
Jean de Brunhoff, the author of the Babar books, lived in Sainte-Maxime for some time and here created the first book. One of the beaches – La Plage des Eléphants – is named after the famous blue elephant.

The Swedish royal family (of the Bernadotte dynasty) owns a villa, Mirage, in the town's central area. It was originally acquired by Prince Bertil, Duke of Halland in 1946 as a second home for himself and his at that time unofficial life partner Lilian Davies, later Princess Lilian, Duchess of Halland. The central and ocean facing boulodrome in Sainte-Maxime is named after the prince, as he was a regular player who appreciated the uncomplicated and warm reception of the village locals.

Raoul Nordling was the Swedish consul in Paris 1944 who made great efforts to save Paris and its citizens during the late phase of the Second World War. He persuaded General Choltitz to disobey Hitler's orders to destroy the French capital and many lives were saved before General Eisenhover approved General Philippe Leclerc de Hauteclocque and Charles de Gaulle to re-enter the town. Nordling had a house in Sainte-Maxime, Le Mas du Gay Savoir; he was also named an honorary citizen. Part of the road to Grimaud is named after him.

Léon Gaumont was a French inventor, engineer and industrialist who was a pioneer of the motion picture industry. Gaumont often stayed in Sainte-Maxime where he owned a castle, Les Tourelles, built circa 1883. This residence served as a backdrop for several films including Judex conducted in 1916 by Louis Feuillade that was shot in part in Sainte-Maxime. The castle – with new buildings – is now a holiday resort. Léon Gaumont died in Sainte-Maxime in 1946.

Paul Géraldy or Paul Lefevre (1885–1983) was a French poet and playwright. He had a house in Sainte-Maxime named Toi et moi ("You and me") which took its name from his second book (which was his breakthrough). The house is located east of the village above the Madrague beach and now split into apartments.

Victor Margueritte (1866–1942) was a French novelist and a frequent guest in Sainte-Maxime. Around 1920, he bought and developed a large property, La Madrague, which stretched from the sea and climbed to the top of the Colline Meinier magnificently facing south. The writer lived in his tower with his wife until 1938.

Michel Constantin (1924–2003) was a French movie actor. He was a frequent guest in Sainte-Maxime where he owned a villa at Beauvallon.

== Gallery ==
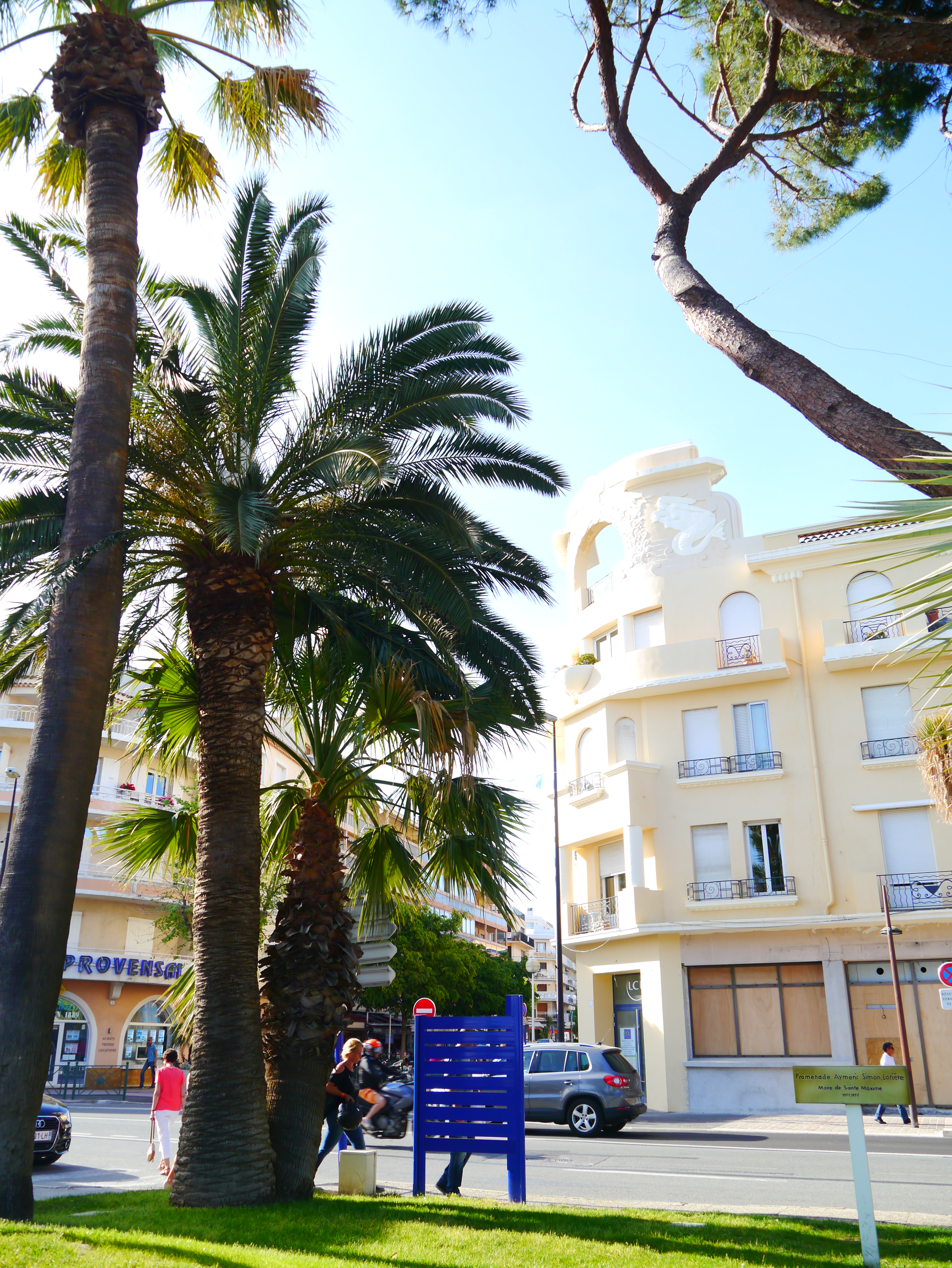
The art deco building Les Sirènes, built in 1929

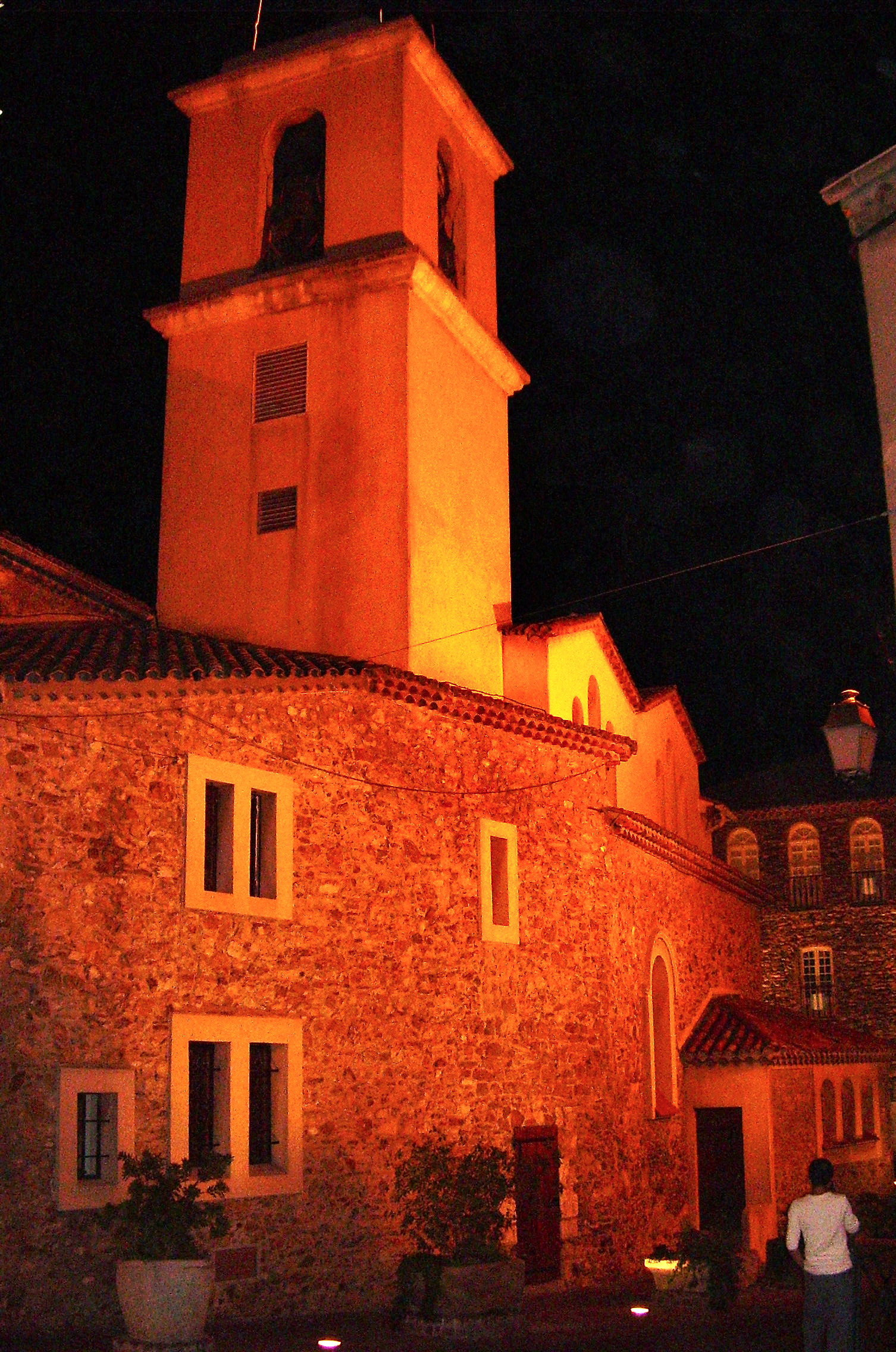
Town church at night

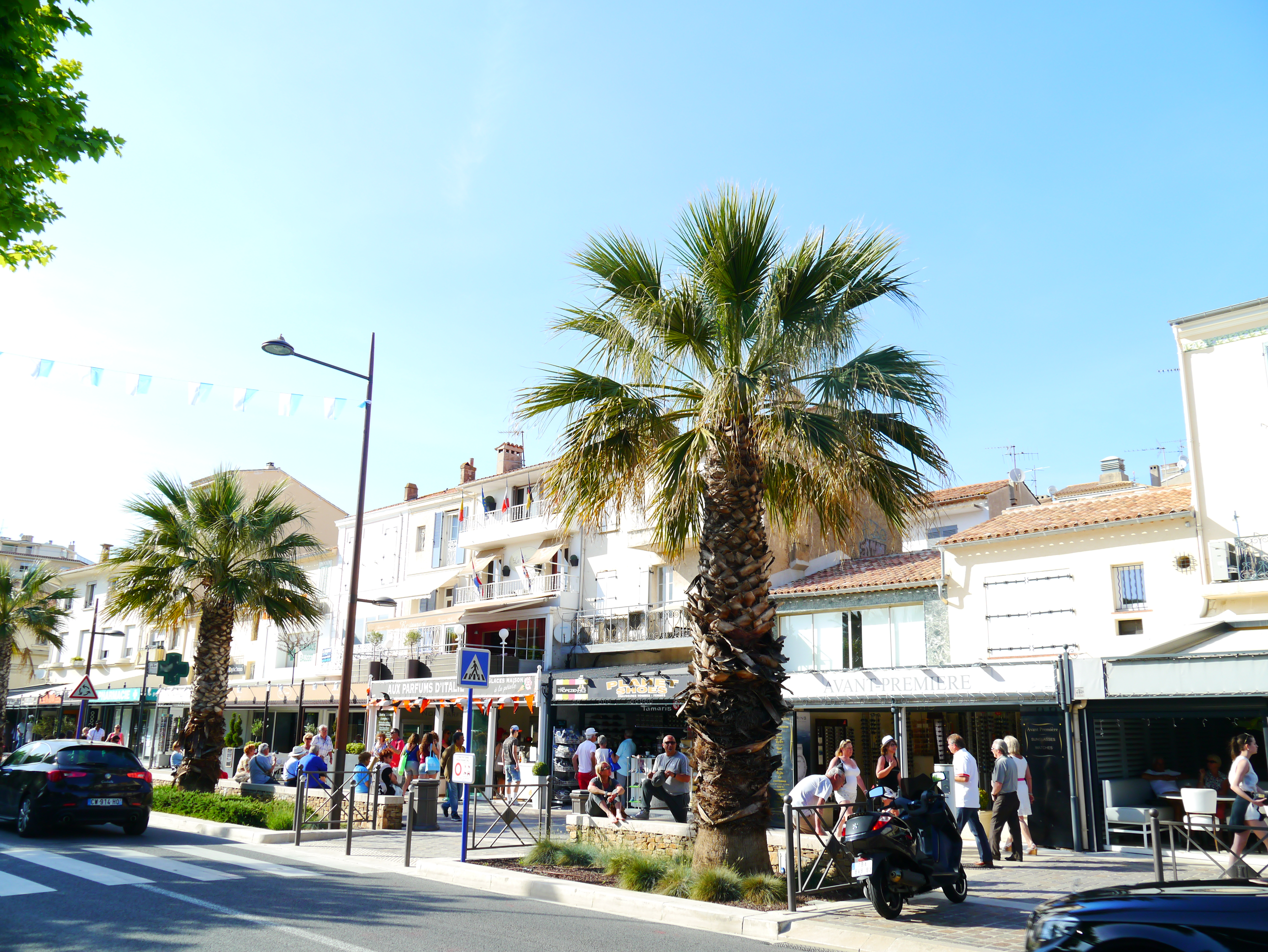
Stores and restaurants next to the Promenade Simon Lorière

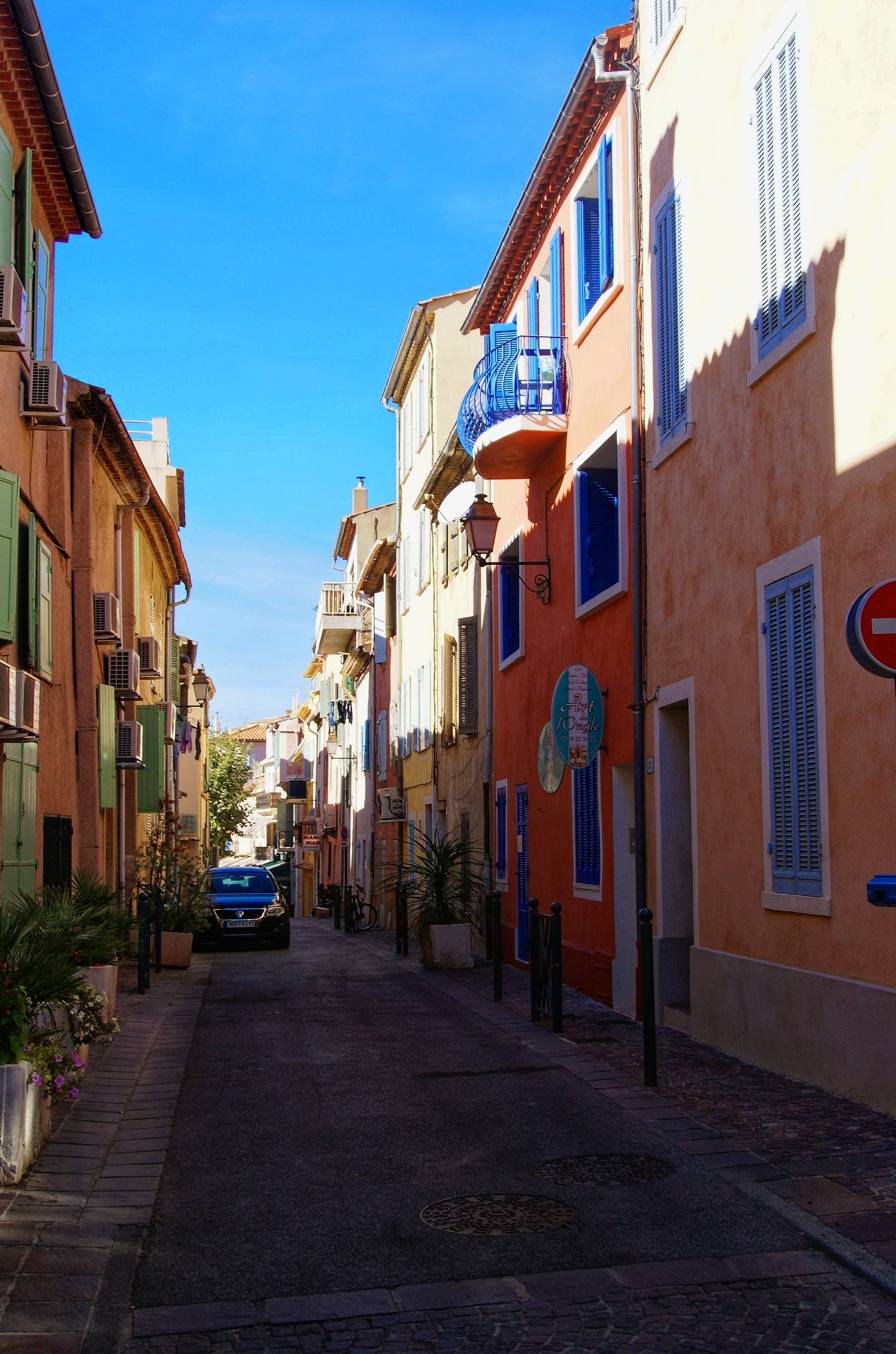
Rue de Lorraine

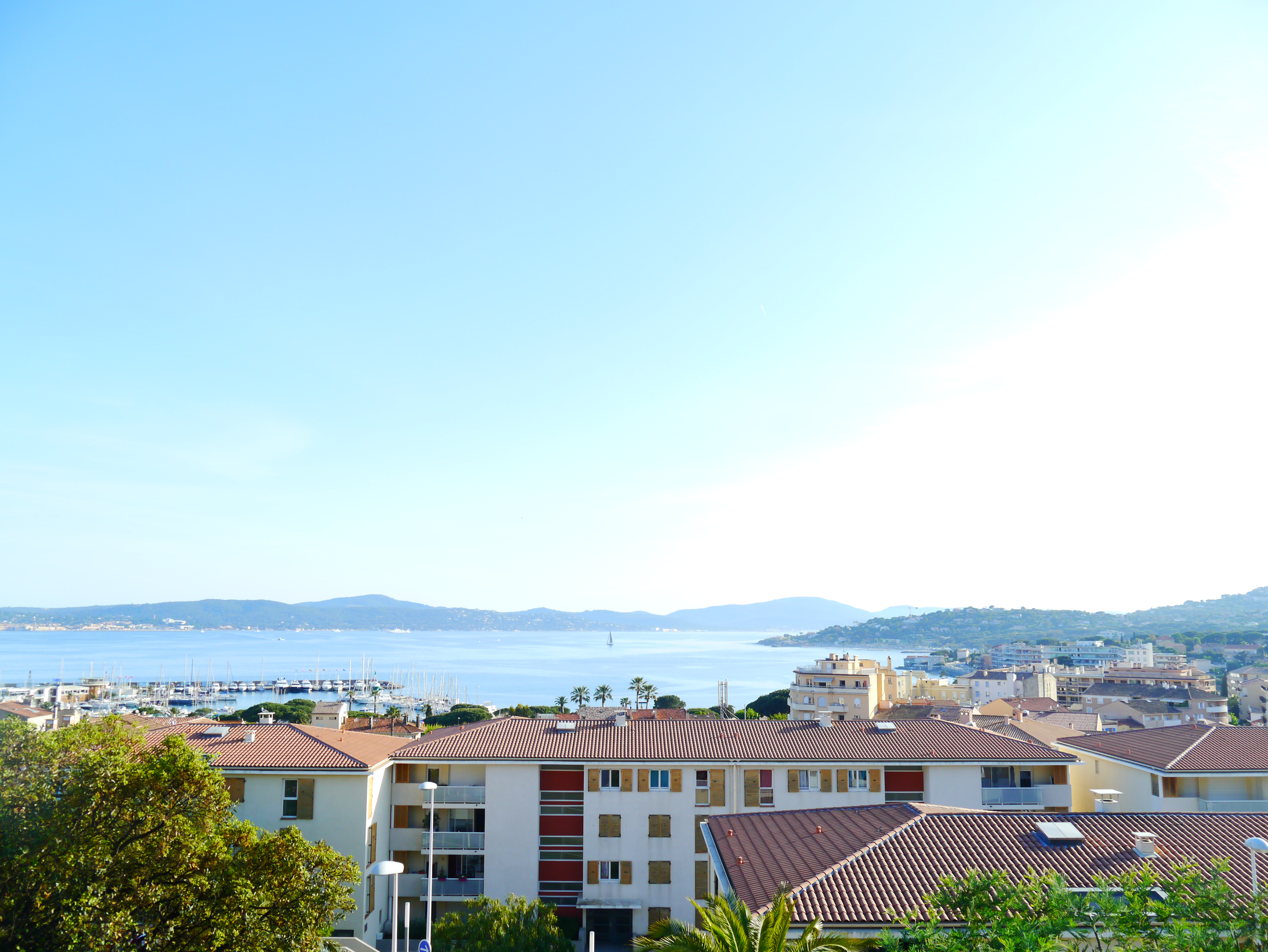
A view of the town from above with the Gulf of Saint-Tropez beyond

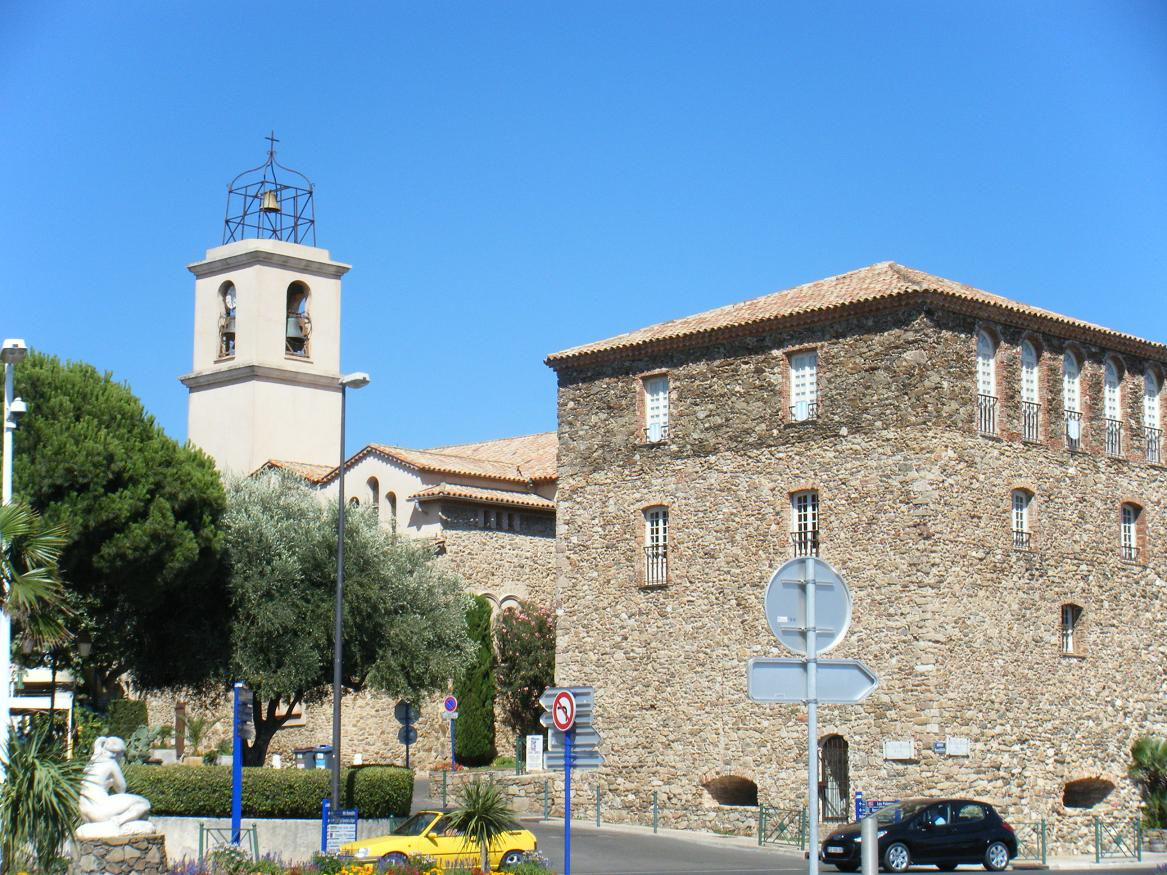
Tour Carrée

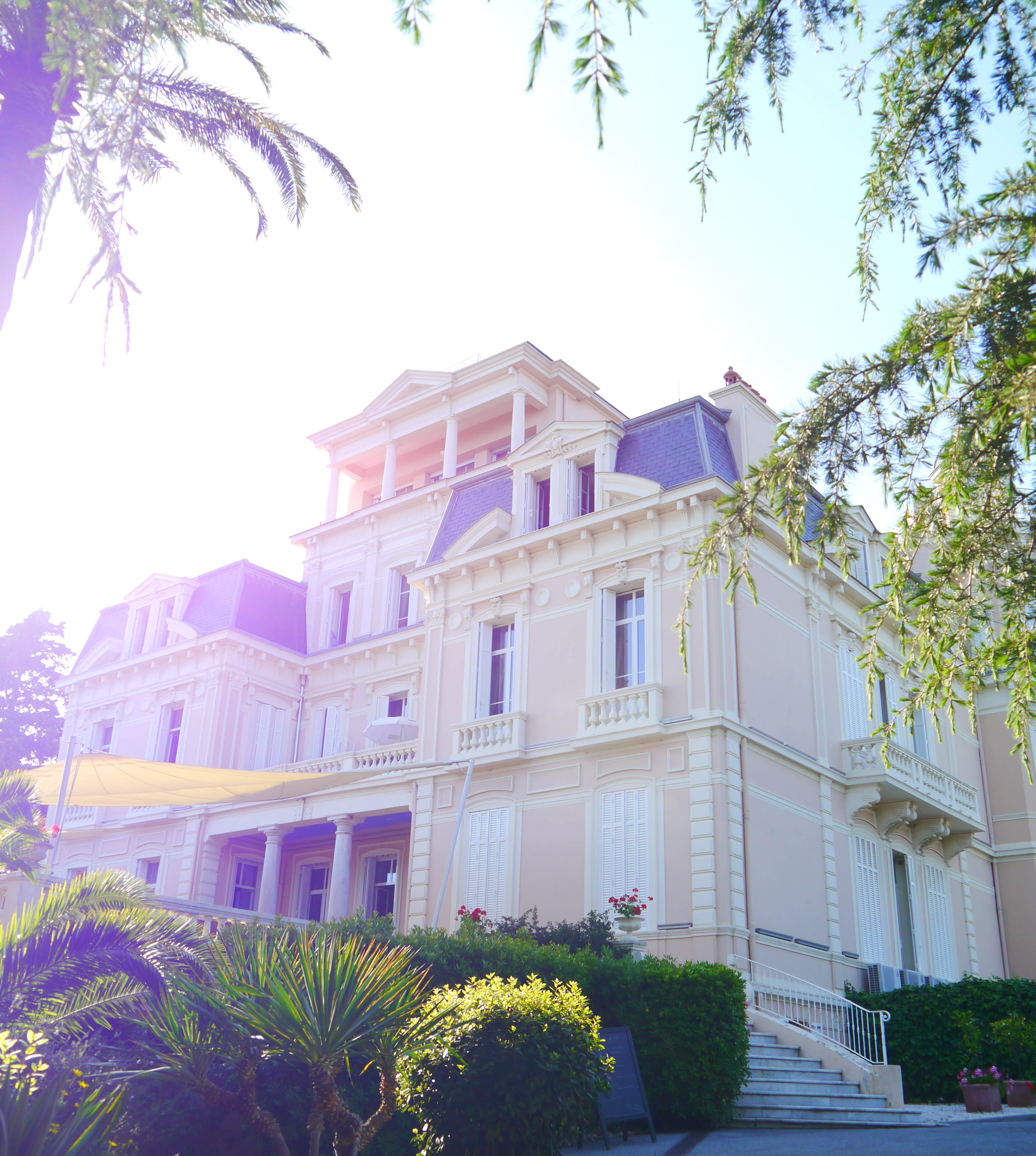
The Hotel Château Léon Gaumont

== Sister cities ==
Sainte-Maxime is twinned with:

- (United States) Bellport, New York
- (Germany) Neuenbürg
- (United States) Matthews, North Carolina

== See also ==
- Communes of the Var department
- Operation Dragoon order of battle
- Sainte-Maxime International Horror Film Festival
