= Lorgues =

Lorgues Lòrgas (Occitan)
- Commune
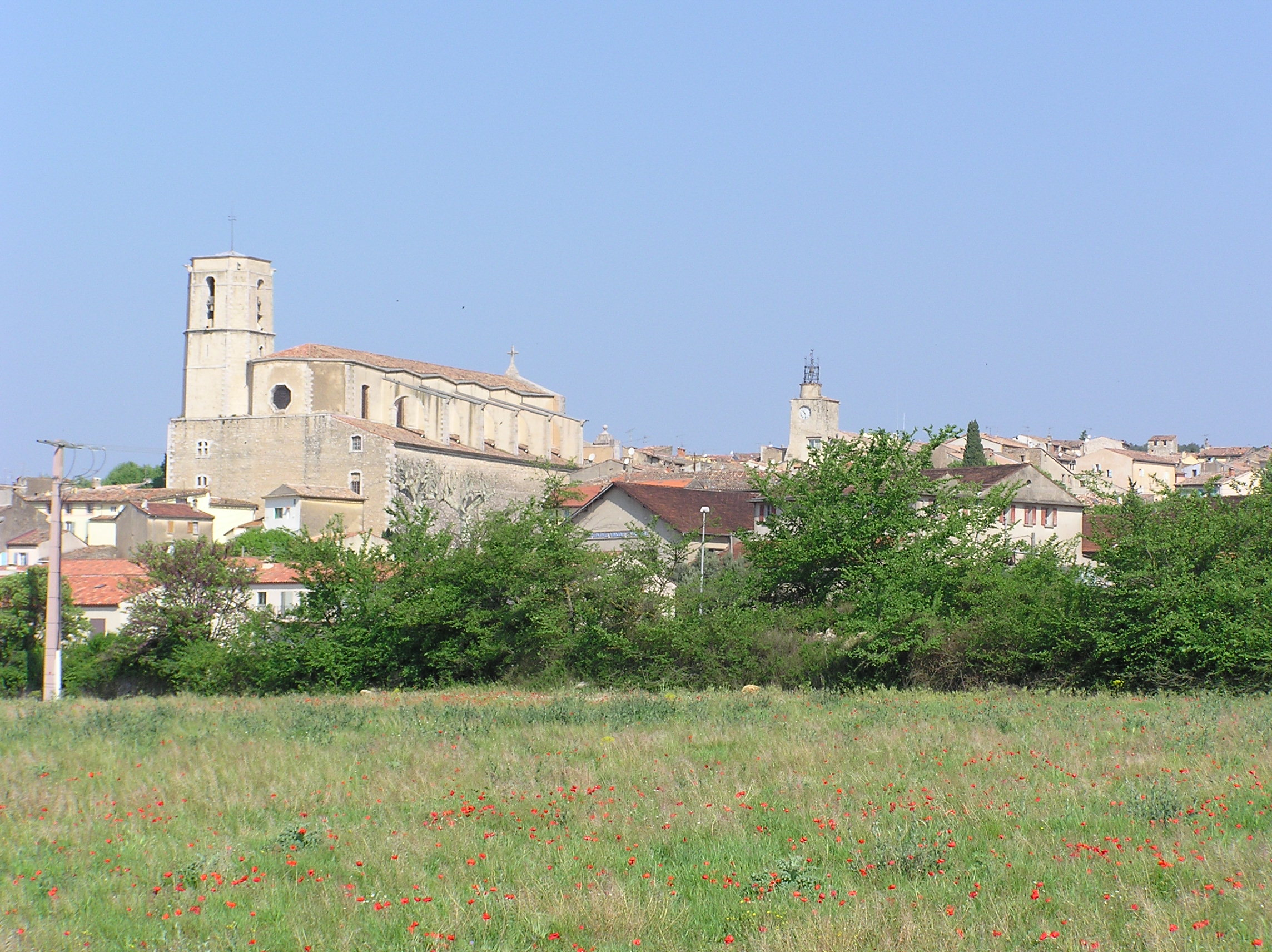
- A general view of the village

- Coat of arms
- Location of Lorgues
- Location within France Location within Provence-Alpes-Côte d'Azur
- Coordinates: 43°29′42″N 6°21′40″E
- Country: France
- Region: Provence-Alpes-Côte d'Azur
- Department: Var
- Arrondissement: Draguignan
- Canton: Vidauban
- Intercommunality: CA Dracénie Provence Verdon

Government
  - Mayor (2020–2026): Claude Alemagna
- Area^{1}: 64.37 km^{2} (24.85 sq mi)
- Elevation: 240 m (790 ft)
- Highest elevation: 343 m (1,125 ft)
- Lowest elevation: 70 m (230 ft)
- Population (2023): 9,849
  - Density: 153.0/km^{2} (396.3/sq mi)
- Time zone: UTC+01:00 (CET)
  - Summer (DST): UTC+02:00 (CEST)
- INSEE/Postal code: 83072 /83 510
- ^{1} French Land Register data, which excludes lakes, ponds, glaciers > 1 km^{2} (0.386 sq mi or 247 acres) and river estuaries.

Lorgues (French pronunciation: [lɔʁɡ]; Occitan: Lòrgas) is a commune in the Var department in the Provence-Alpes-Côte d'Azur region in Southeastern France.

It is situated 13 km (8 mi) southwest of the city of Draguignan, seat of the larger arrondissement of Draguignan.

== Geography ==
=== Location ===
Lorgues is situated in the center of the department of the Var between the Mediterranean Sea and the Gorges du Verdon/Lac Sainte Croix. The town can be reached via the A8 motorway (20 km away) or the SNCF Les Arcs-Draguignan railway station (12 km); by air, Toulon-Hyères Airport is 45 minutes away, Nice Côte d'Azur Airport 1 hour 10 minutes, and Marseille Provence Airport 1 hour 30 minutes.

Its setting has been favourable for the town, with Lorgues lying where two ancient routes cross. One, north–south, climbs from the Mediterranean coast into the interior while the other, east–west, is part of the long inland route from Italy to the Rhône Valley that runs along the foot of the high plateaus. This focus of communication has resulted in Lorgues being an important market town and regional centre throughout its history.

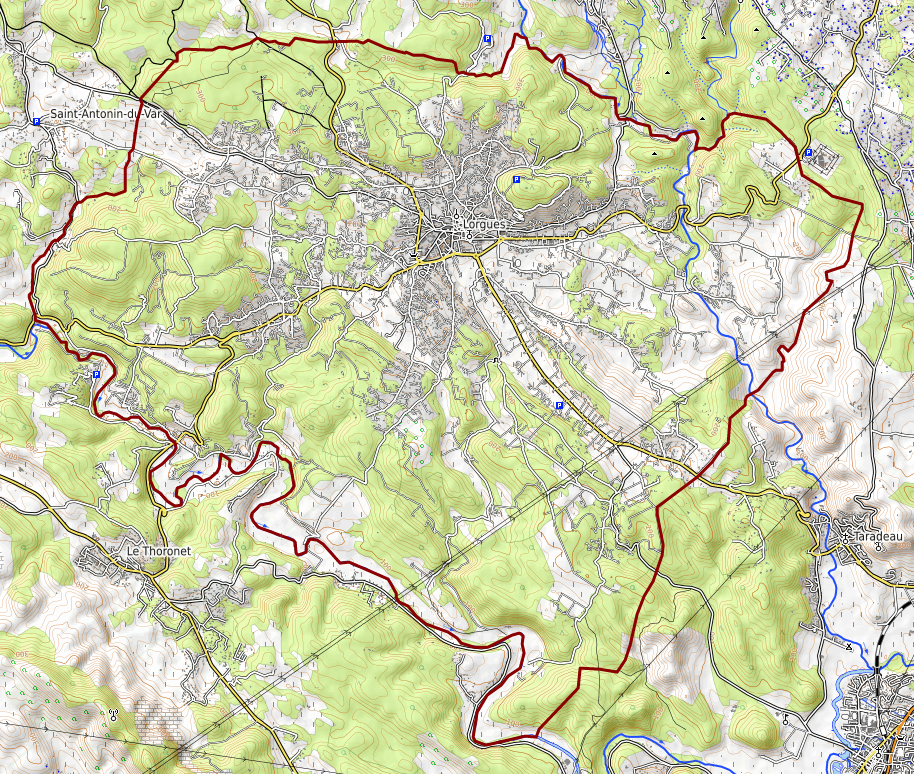
Topographic map of Lorgues

=== Relief ===
In terms of geology Lorgues is, for the most part, underlain by Triassic and Jurassic limestones which give rise to gentle hills and narrow flat-bottomed valleys, the most important of which are the valleys of the rivers Argens and Florièye which border the commune on the south and east. The town centre stands at an elevation of 210m, with the hill of Saint Ferréol to the east rising to 320m.

The limestones are important in that they absorb rainwater into cracks and crevices in winter, releasing it through countless springs during the heat of summer. Water is a precious resource in Provence and the relative abundance of springs and streams in the Lorgues area has been vital for cultivating crops and trees. In the years before steam power, running water supplied power for mills to grind olives and grain.

=== Climate ===
Lorgues has been favoured with respect to climate. It is high enough above the plain of the Var to be cooled by summer breezes while being low enough and sufficiently sheltered to avoid the bitter winter winds that sweep across the plateau to the north. Nevertheless, it has known both droughts and deep frosts: both of which have had impacts on agriculture.

Climate data for Lorgues (1981−2010 normals, extremes 1949−2000)
Month	Jan	Feb	Mar	Apr	May	Jun	Jul	Aug	Sep	Oct	Nov	Dec	Year
Record high °C (°F)	22.0 (71.6)	25.0 (77.0)	28.5 (83.3)	29.5 (85.1)	35.0 (95.0)	39.0 (102.2)	41.3 (106.3)	40.0 (104.0)	36.0 (96.8)	33.0 (91.4)	24.1 (75.4)	23.2 (73.8)	41.3 (106.3)
Mean daily maximum °C (°F)	12.0 (53.6)	13.2 (55.8)	16.3 (61.3)	18.2 (64.8)	22.9 (73.2)	26.8 (80.2)	31.4 (88.5)	31.3 (88.3)	26.4 (79.5)	20.7 (69.3)	15.2 (59.4)	12.2 (54.0)	20.6 (69.1)
Daily mean °C (°F)	6.9 (44.4)	7.7 (45.9)	10.3 (50.5)	12.4 (54.3)	16.7 (62.1)	20.5 (68.9)	24.2 (75.6)	24.1 (75.4)	20.1 (68.2)	15.5 (59.9)	10.4 (50.7)	7.6 (45.7)	14.7 (58.5)
Mean daily minimum °C (°F)	1.8 (35.2)	2.2 (36.0)	4.3 (39.7)	6.7 (44.1)	10.6 (51.1)	14.2 (57.6)	17.0 (62.6)	16.9 (62.4)	13.8 (56.8)	10.4 (50.7)	5.6 (42.1)	3.0 (37.4)	8.9 (48.0)
Record low °C (°F)	−10.3 (13.5)	−16.0 (3.2)	−8.0 (17.6)	−5.0 (23.0)	−2.0 (28.4)	2.0 (35.6)	6.0 (42.8)	6.0 (42.8)	0.5 (32.9)	−2.0 (28.4)	−6.4 (20.5)	−8.2 (17.2)	−16.0 (3.2)
Average precipitation mm (inches)	72.1 (2.84)	38.9 (1.53)	50.5 (1.99)	80.4 (3.17)	74.6 (2.94)	49.9 (1.96)	22.3 (0.88)	47.4 (1.87)	90.2 (3.55)	109.2 (4.30)	106.9 (4.21)	79.3 (3.12)	821.7 (32.35)
Average precipitation days (≥ 1.0 mm)	5.6	4.0	5.1	7.6	6.1	4.2	2.3	3.3	5.3	7.1	7.2	6.5	64.3
Source: Météo-France

=== Water ===
Water is abundant in Lorgues, an essential for the growth of a town. The town long used two nearby water sources: the Canal and the Pond (today, the supply comes from the local springs of Ste Foy and Entraigues). The naturally sloping terrain of the town allowed maximum use of these canals. The wash-house and its fountain were the obligatory meeting point for women, young people and also animals.

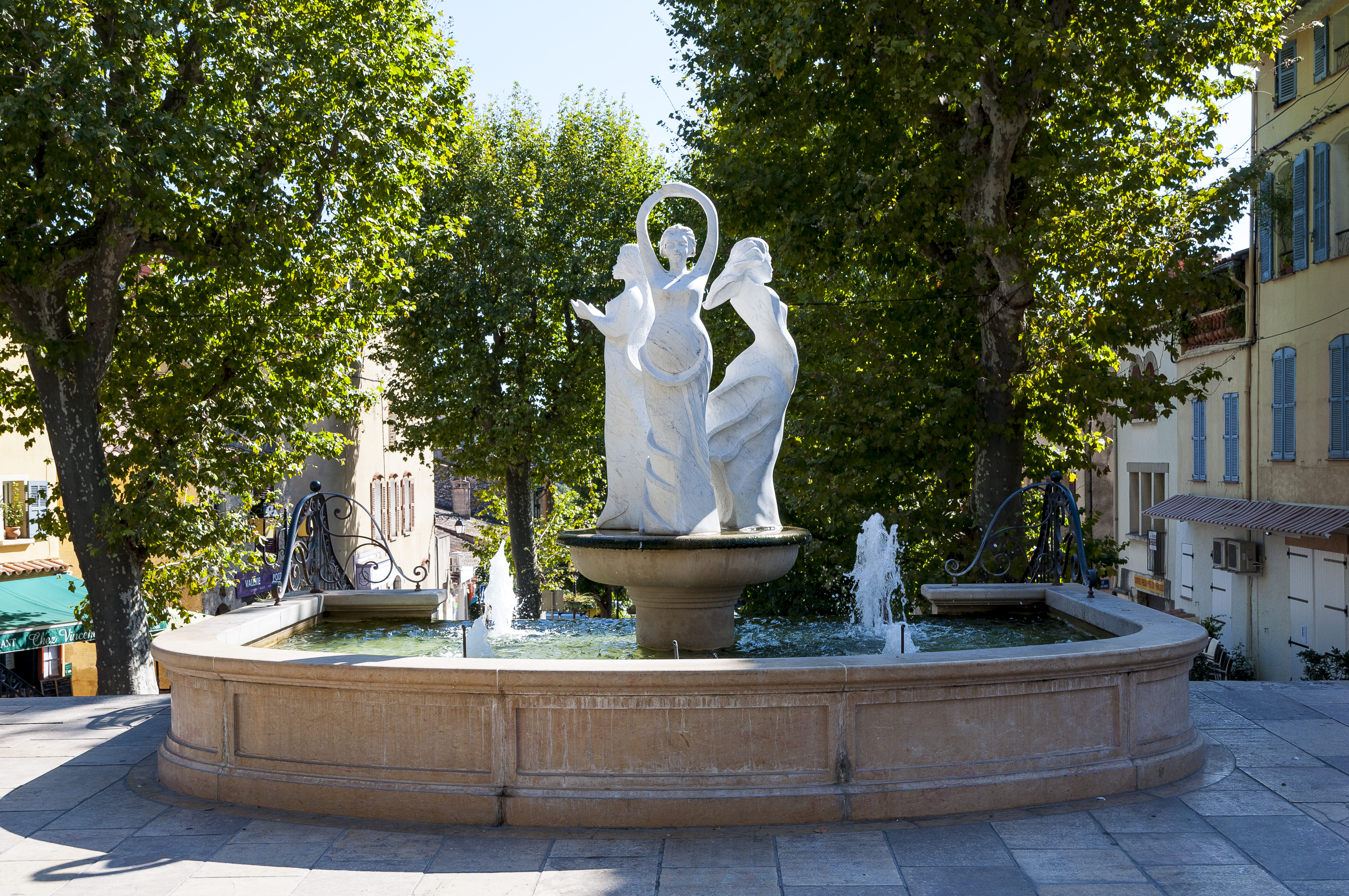
Fontaine des Demoiselles (Fountain of the Young Ladies)

The canals were scrupulously maintained until the 1930s, as was the washhouse on Canal Street. The Canal flowed until the heat wave of 2003; now it flows intermittently, but its bed has been completely excavated, because of severe flooding in 2010.

These canals, and the many fountains still present in the older parts of the town, were used to water the gardens, as at the Lower Fountain (Font basse, 13th century), and also served to run olive oil mills. They were also an ornament to the town, such the Fontaine de la Noix (1771) or more recently the Fontaine des Demoiselles (2011). Other older ones, as the Fountain of the Pump, brought their water to the inhabitants of the medieval town.

== History ==
=== Pre-history to Roman times ===
The oldest solid evidence of human settlement around Lorgues are two Bronze Age tombs (dolmen) in the hamlet of St Jaume, testimony to a very old settlement, around 2,000 to 3,000 BC. On the wooded hill of Saint-Ferréol that overlooks the town to the east are the remains of an oppidum: a fortified settlement that acted as a refuge for the community in the troubled centuries before Rome brought stability to the area.

Lorgues’ status as a market town and regional centre began during the long period of stability (over 500 years) which marked Roman rule in Provence. Latin gave rise to the Provençal language, and the adoption of Christianity was to shape the history of Lorgues, as can be seen from its numerous chapels and other religious buildings.

=== Medieval Lorgues ===
The period from the end of the Roman empire to the 11th or 12th century is poorly documented. Lorgues developed as a small market town, deeply rooted in agriculture, a regional centre for church, education and legal matters, a place for matters of trade and travel. In the 12th century the Knights Templar of the Ruou Commandry (Commanderie du Ruou) acquired an interest in Lorgues and for nearly two centuries dominated the town where they probably took responsibility for the welfare of its inhabitants. Despite not being involved in fighting in France the Templars retained a military outlook and oversaw the creation of ramparts, towers and fortified gateways around the ancient part of Lorgues, which can still be seen even though only a few of the original twelve towers and nine gates now remain.

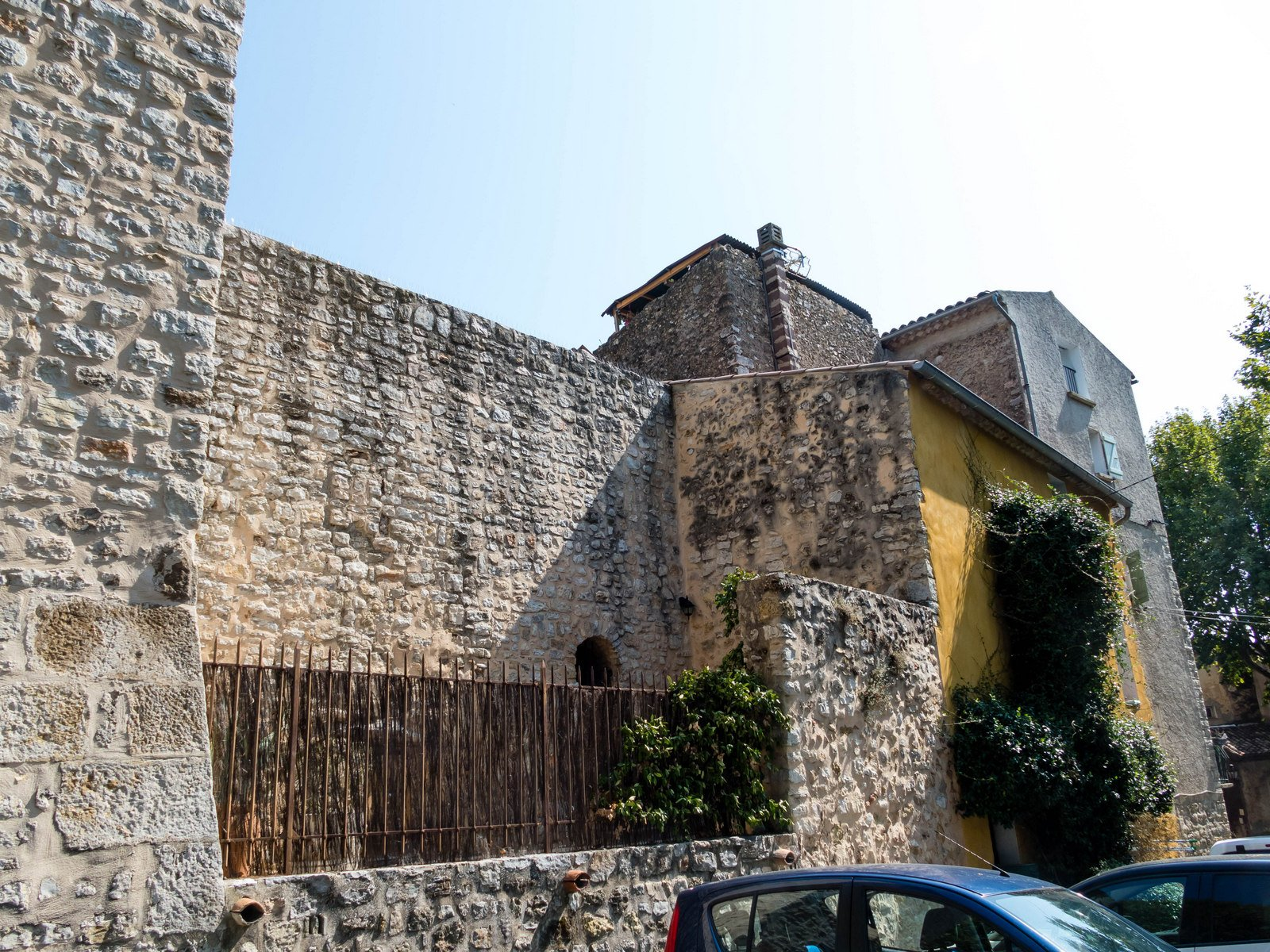
Medieval ramparts, now converted to dwellings

During the 13th to 15th centuries Lorgues continued to grow. Its status as a free independent town within the County of Provence was confirmed in 1402 by Louis II and again in 1486 by René d’Anjou, Count of Provence. In 1474 Count René permitted the town to expand to the east of the old fortified area (the castrum). The result was Place Neuve (New Square) and additional buildings to the south. In 1486 the old county of Provence was absorbed into the kingdom of France, although French did not become the official language for another 60 years.

=== 16th to 18th century ===
Despite episodes of epidemics and plagues, and the Wars of Religion, Lorgues continued to grow in the 16th century, with many new religious buildings (some have been converted to other use, others no longer exist) in addition to town houses. In 1579 the town withstood a siege of six weeks during the Wars of Religion, during which a fountain in the old town (still in use) kept working and so enabled the defenders to resist. Olives were the most important crop and the town had at least seventeen olive presses.

In 1623 the present ‘campanile’ – open bell tower – was erected by raising the height of a tower at the corner of the old ramparts. Many houses were built to the south of what is now the Avenue de la Republique, in the area to the west of the new collegiate church of Saint Martin which was the town's major building project in the early 18th century (1704–29). A livestock market was held from around the 18th century on the edge of the old town in Les Aires Neuves, now Place Accarisio, where wheat was also threshed. One of the eight olive oil mills in Lorgues, the mill of Saint Martin (1776) can be seen in the square; it got its power from the local canal.

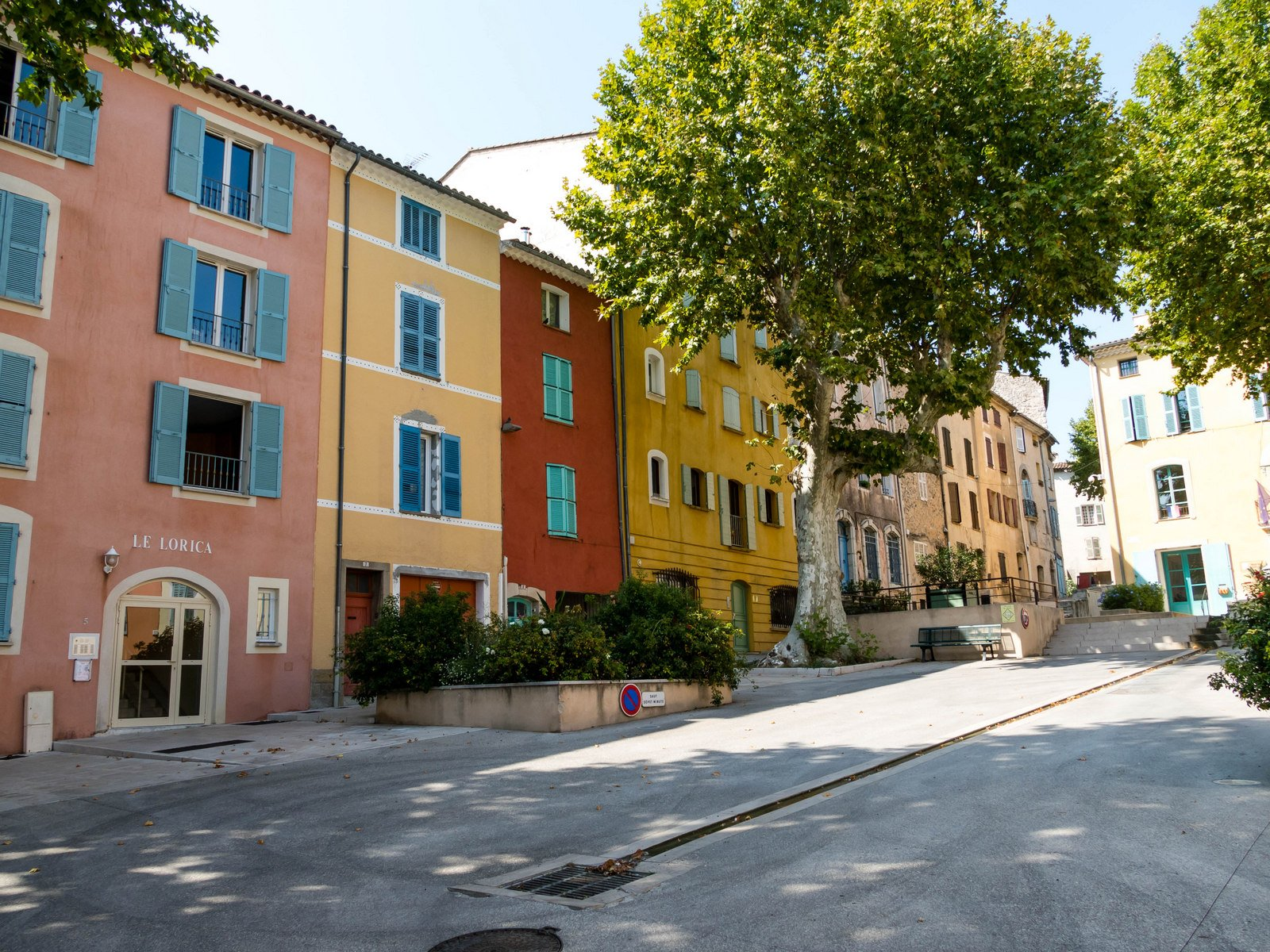
Place Neuve

Lorgues was one of 12 vigueries (an area for administering justice and finance) in Provence, and the Palais de Justice (1768) in Place Neuve was built to house the law courts. A symbol of civil pride, the Fountain of the Walnut (Fontaine de la Noix) was erected in 1771.

The period of the French Revolution at the end of the 18th century did not affect Lorgues greatly, even though the town retained sympathies to the monarchy. Under the new constitution of 1790, France was organised into 83 departments, and Lorgues became part of the Var.

=== Modern Lorgues ===
Nineteenth-century Lorgues was marked by prosperity, during which the population rose to around 5,000. Many large houses were built along the Boulevard de la République, a grand town hall (mairie) was also built and a large public school building erected. French olive oil began to face competition from cheaper imports, resulting in a switch to the vine as a preferred crop.

The population began to decline at the end of the 19th century, and suffered a particular blow after the First World War when some 93 men were killed. The war memorial was erected in 1921 in a garden on the site of today's Marius Trussy Square. War trophies – a cannon and four shells – contributed to its decoration. When it was decided in 1958 to level the garden at street level to make a square, the monument was moved to the Place d’Antrechaus, at the top end of Boulevard de la République, where it stands today, although without the war trophies.

In the confusion of the Allied landings in Provence in August 1944, Lorgues suffered civilian deaths from air attack and also the loss of 22 of its young men by the retreating Germans. In consequence the town was awarded the Croix de guerre 1939-1945.

After the war the population of Lorgues remained low and it continues as a small town dependent on agriculture. However the ‘discovery’ of the south of France as a holiday destination in the 1960s led to growth, especially with the construction of the A8 autoroute and the TGV train line. Tourism is now an important part of the economy. Many of the older buildings in Lorgues have become residences or put to other use: for example, the Cultural Centre was once a convent and some of the old olive mills are now homes or restaurants.

Much work has been done to make the older part of the town fit for the 21st century without destroying its character. In the medieval part of the town, new squares have been created where older buildings have had to be demolished. The latest, inaugurated in February 2020, is the Square of Queen Joanna.

=== Coat of arms ===
Lorgues coat of arms

Lorgues' coat of arms is first recorded in the mid-17th century. It has changed slightly over the years through Revolution and Restoration, but the emblems of the lion and the dog supporting a fleur-de-lys have been consistent: the animals symbolise the town's motto “Strength and Fidelity” (Force et Fidélité).

== Politics and administration ==
Lorgues is part of the Dracénie Provence Verdon agglomeration, created in 2000, which groups 23 communes (listed below in alphabetical order).

Draguignan; Ampus; Bargemon; Bargème; Callas; Châteaudouble; Claviers; Comps-sur-Artuby; Figanières; Flayosc; La Bastide; La Motte; La Roque-Esclapon; Le Muy; Montferrat; Les Arcs; Lorgues; Saint-Antonin-du-Var; Salernes; Sillans-la-Cascade; Taradeau; Trans-en-Provence; Vidauban.

In December 2020 Lorgues was chosen to become a Petite Ville de Demain (Small Town of Tomorrow) in recognition of its efforts to improve the life of its inhabitants and that of the small communities surrounding the town with a commitment to a more ecological development.

== Demography ==
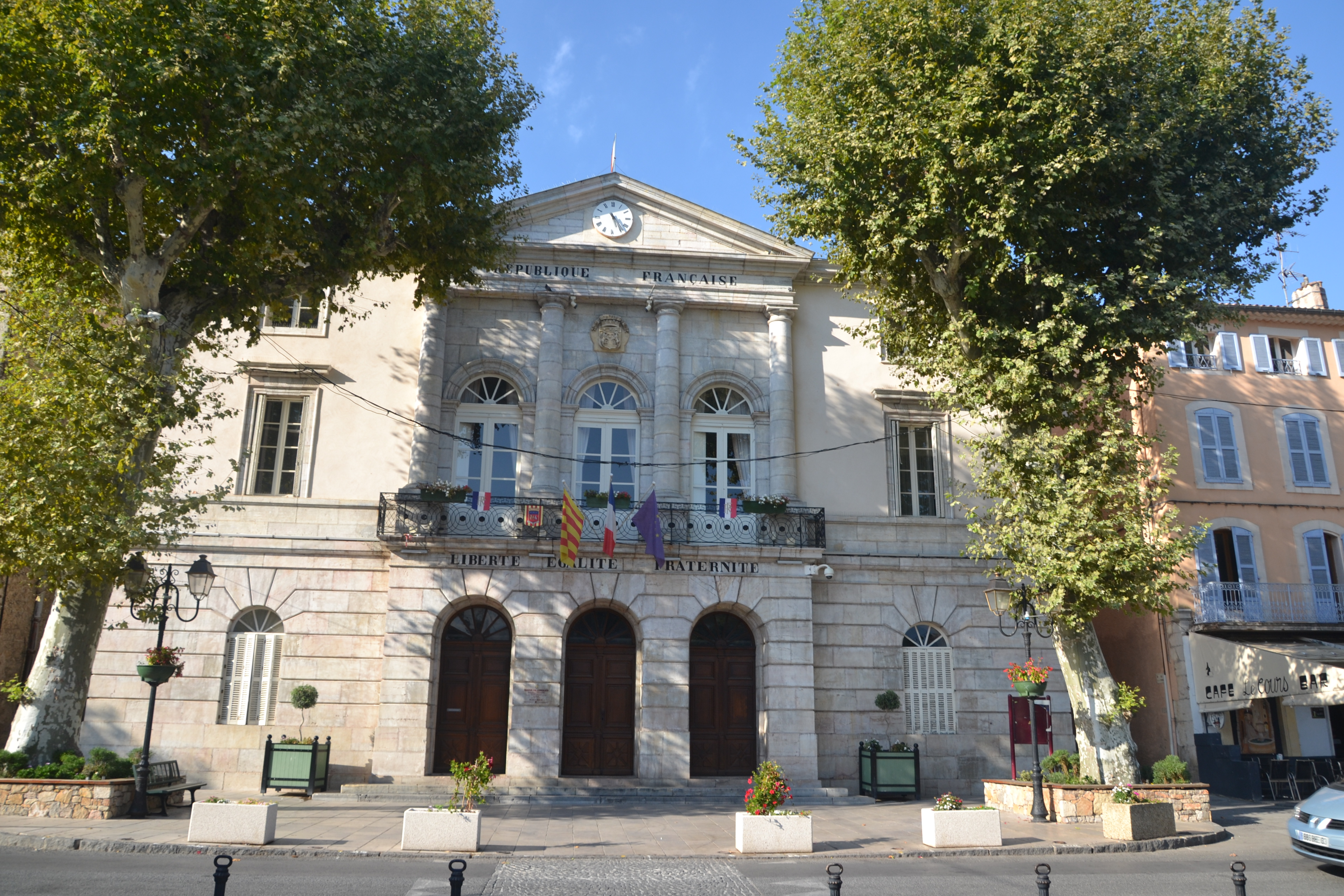
Lorgues Town Hall (Mairie)

Lorgues reached a population peak of 5,509 in the late 18th century, which it was not to pass again until the 1980s. It stayed fairly stable at over 4,000 for the next 90 years, only starting to decline at the end of the 19th century. As with many French towns, the population dropped considerably after the First World War to around 2,500, and grew only slowly after that. It was not until the mid-1960s, when the area became popular as a holiday and retirement destination, that the population began to grow, which it steadily did from the late 1960s to reach around 9,000 in the 2010s.

Historical population

Year	Pop.	±% p.a.
1793	5,509	—
1821	5,418	−0.06%
1846	4,603	−0.65%
1872	4,436	−0.14%
1901	3,197	−1.12%
1926	2,685	−0.70%
1946	2,613	−0.14%
1962	2,865	+0.58%
1968	3,401	+2.90%

Year	Pop.	±% p.a.
1975	4,173	+2.97%
1982	5,196	+3.18%
1990	6,340	+2.52%
1999	7,319	+1.61%
2007	8,846	+2.40%
2012	9,047	+0.45%
2017	8,990	−0.13%
2023	9,849	+1.53%

Source: EHESS and INSEE (1968-2023)

== Economy ==
The remains of Lorgues’ agricultural heritage can be found in the many old mills (flour or olive oil), bread ovens and wine presses. The town is still surrounded by numerous vineyards, with around 14 main producers whose wine is exported as well being sold locally. Although the number of olive trees has declined (there were said to be over 20,000 trees in the late 19th century), olives are still harvested.

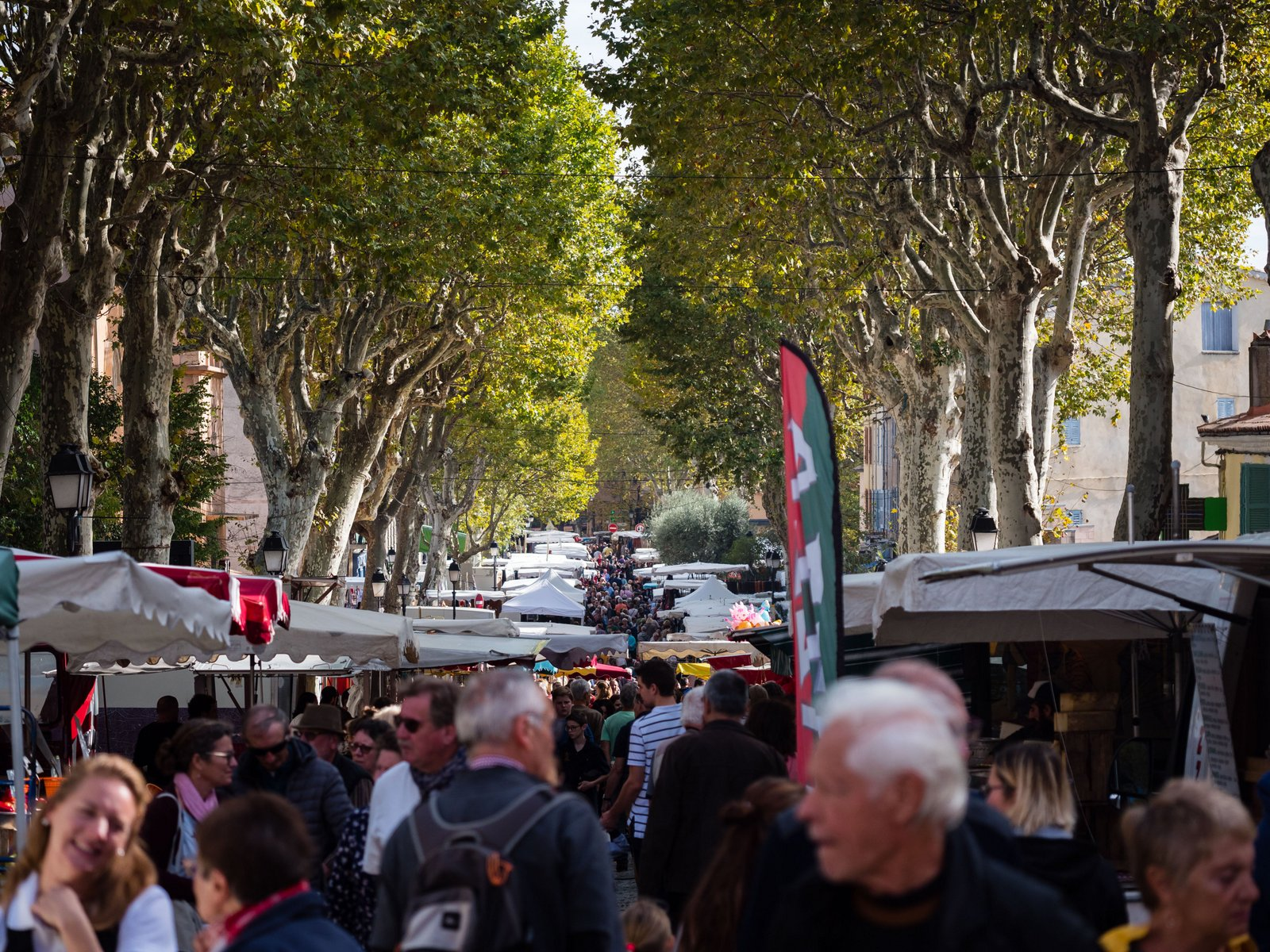
Lorgues Tuesday market

With the rise in popularity of the area as a place for holidays and retirement, many services have developed to meet the needs of second-home owners and for those wishing to build or maintain their homes. With its position between the sea and the Gorges du Verdon, Lorgues is ideally situated as a tourist destination, and attracts large numbers, not only from other parts of France but other countries, in the season. A large number of restaurants in and around the town help to cater for them as well as the resident population.

As well as a range of shops catering for everyday needs, Lorgues holds the largest market in the Dracénie region every Tuesday morning. A wide range of fruit, vegetables, fish, poultry, meat, bread, clothes and many other products, are on offer. In the summer months, a Friday market showcases local producers, mostly fruit, vegetables, cheeses and wines.

== Heritage ==
As the section on Lorgues’ history indicates, there are many old buildings and monuments, in and around the town. Many have been preserved thanks to the efforts of the local heritage society, the Friends of Saint-Ferréol and Old Lorgues (Association des Amis de Saint-Ferréol et Vieux Lorgues). A selection is mentioned below and more information can be found on the Association’s website.

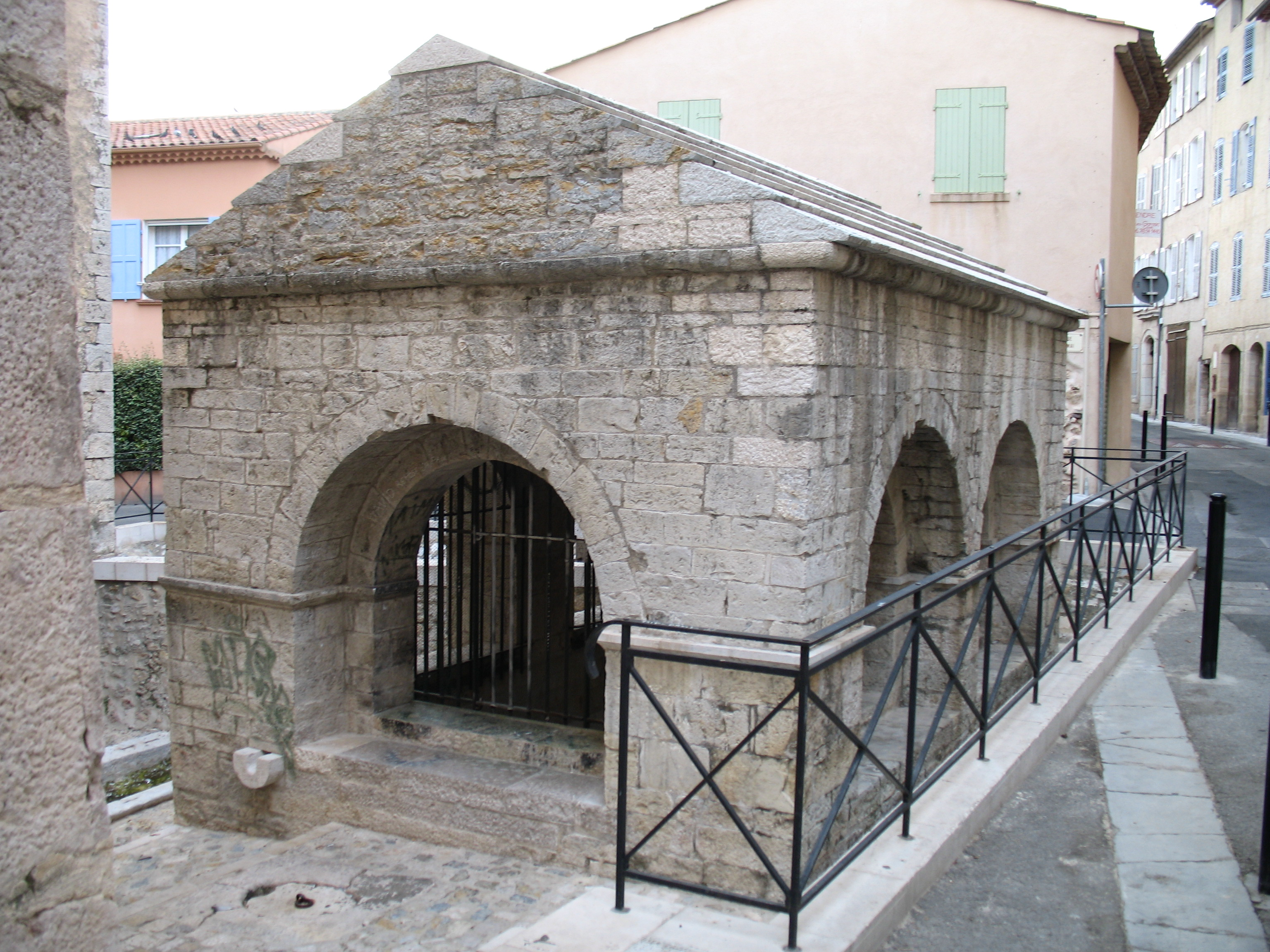
Lower Fountain

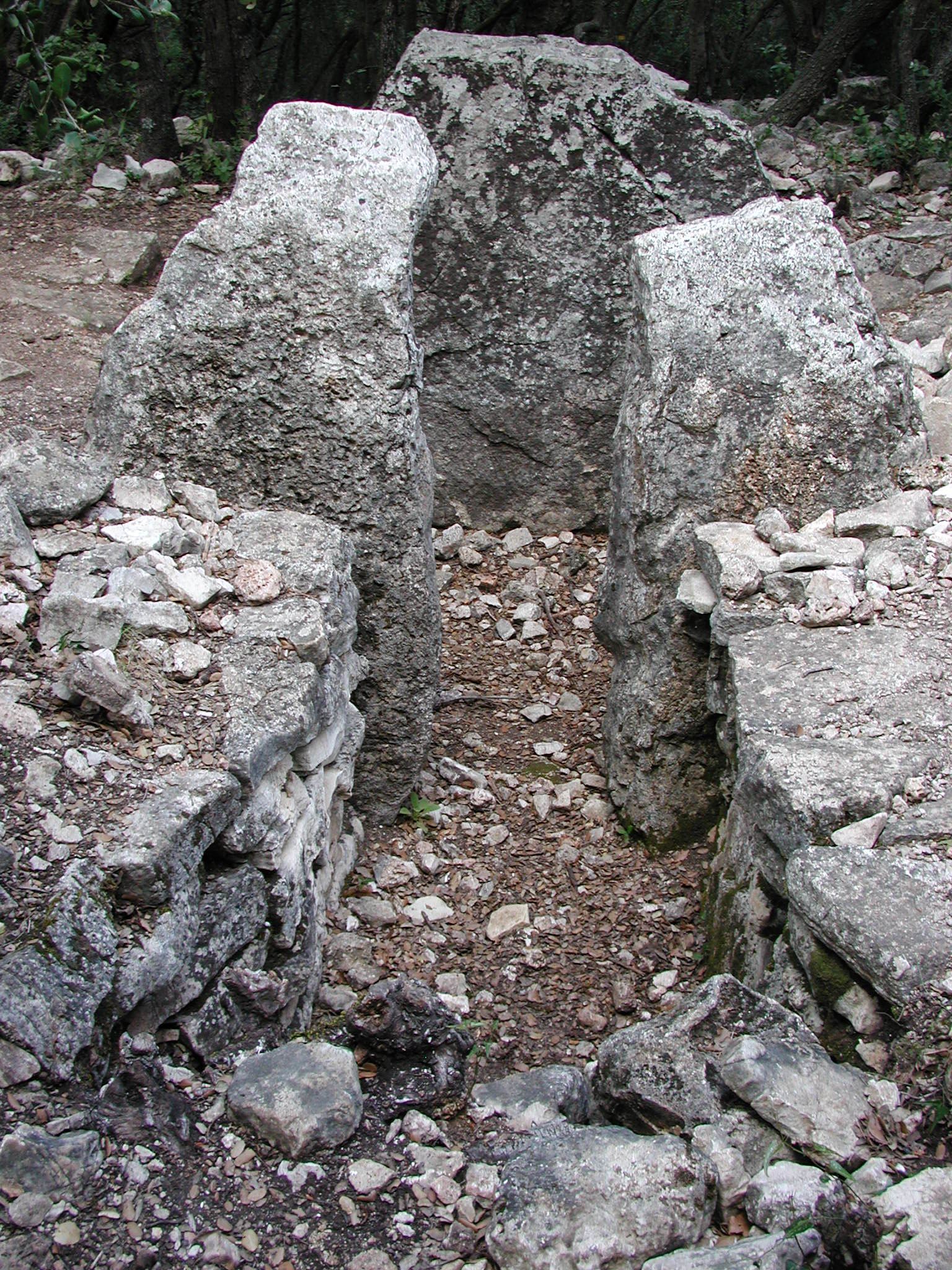
Peycervier dolmen

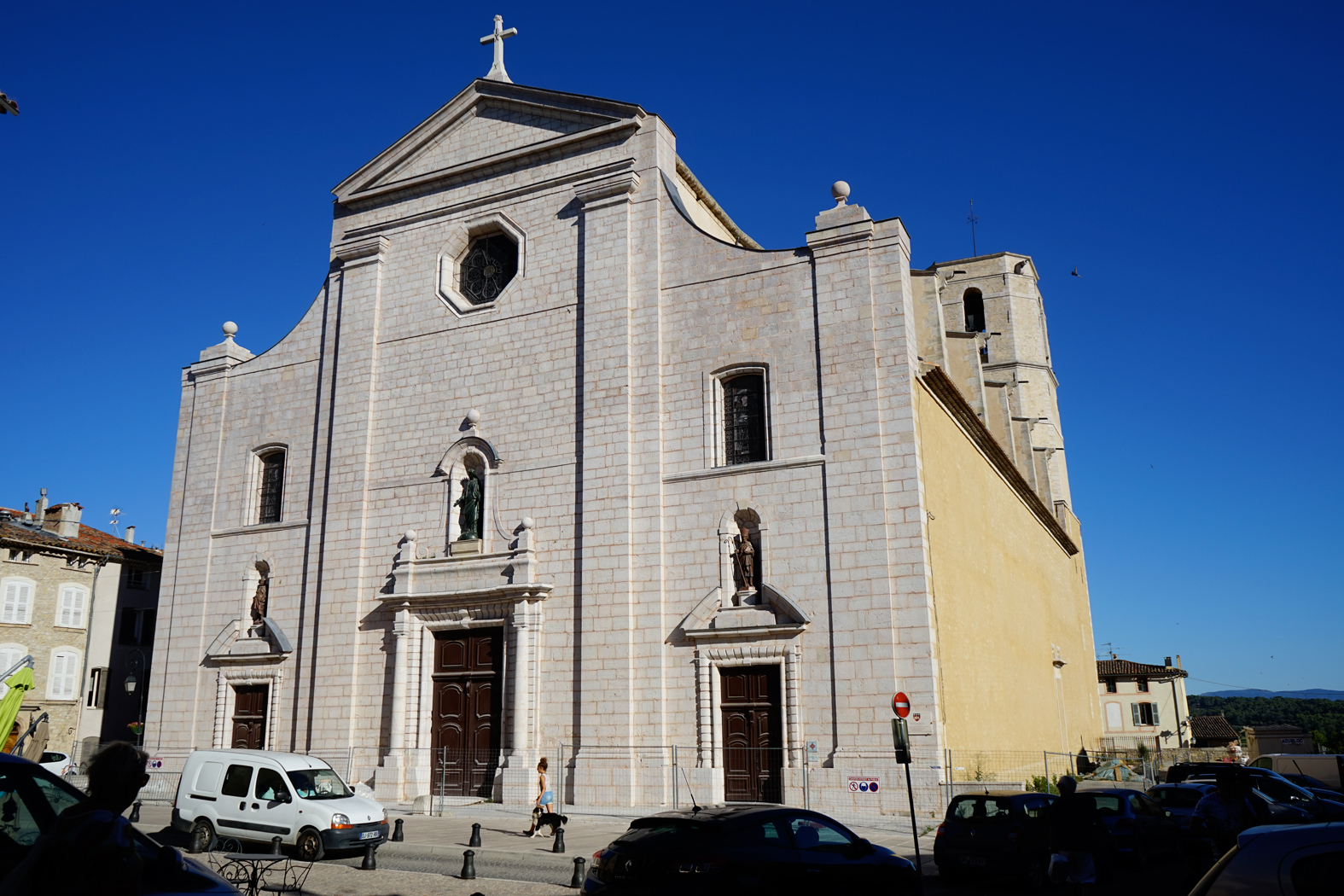
Collegiate church of St Martin

=== Lorgues old town (‘castrum’) ===
The medieval town is the core of Lorgues, with its narrow, winding streets. Many towers from the old defensive system can still be seen, such as the Sarrasine Gate. Outside the original walls are rows of houses dating from the 16th century onwards, and later buildings such as the Palais de Justice, the 17th century lawcourts. Maps for exploring the old town, its chapels and its fountains are available from the Tourist Office.

The town hall (mairie) and old school were built in the 19th century when the town was expanding.

=== Religious buildings ===
Lorgues has an important heritage of chapels. Many of the oldest are situated on the roads leading into the town and feature a porch, a “halle”, a protection against bad weather. Some of them took on a new function over time, as chapels to hamlets, others today are privately owned and have been converted to secular use or abandoned.

In the 17th and 19th centuries some chapels were built by religious communities: Saint Ferréol and Saint François date from the 17th century; the 19th century chapels are now either in private hands or no longer used. The 18th century saw the building of the Collegiate Church of Saint Martin to replace the old parish church of the same name.

Few chapels have been able to keep their original decoration, paintings, altarpieces, frescoes, reliquary busts and statues. Some that have are Sainte-Anne, Saint-Ferréol, Saint-François and especially Notre-Dame de Ben-Va, which contains early 16th-century frescos. Others have only preserved relics of furnishings, such as Saint-Honorat, Saint-Jaume, Saint-Jean-Baptiste and Notre-Dame de Florièyes. All have been altered by the vicissitudes of history: invasions, revolution and rural exodus.

Some of the chapels can be visited by appointment with the Tourist Office or at certain other times of the year.

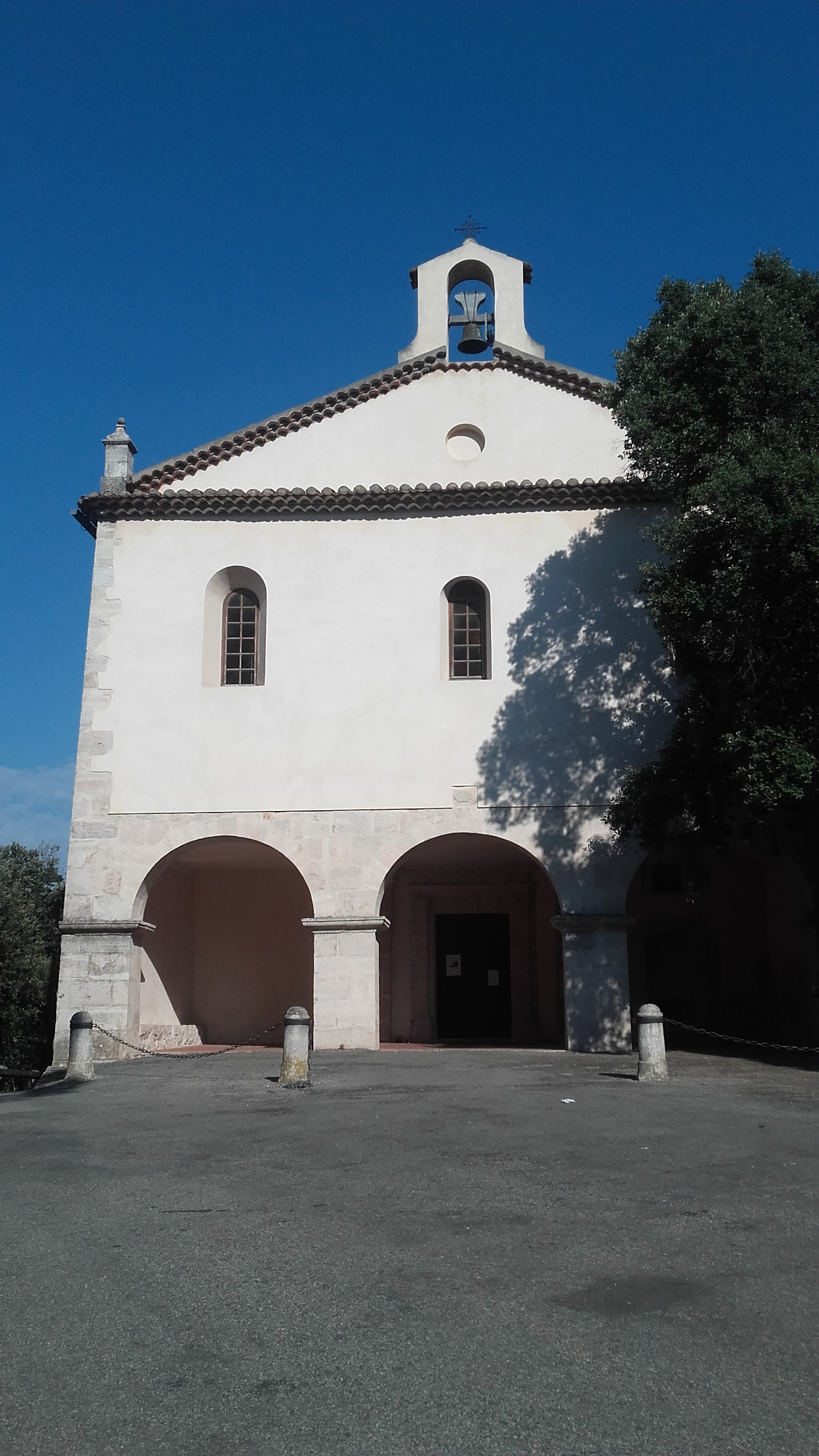
Chapel of Saint-Ferréol.

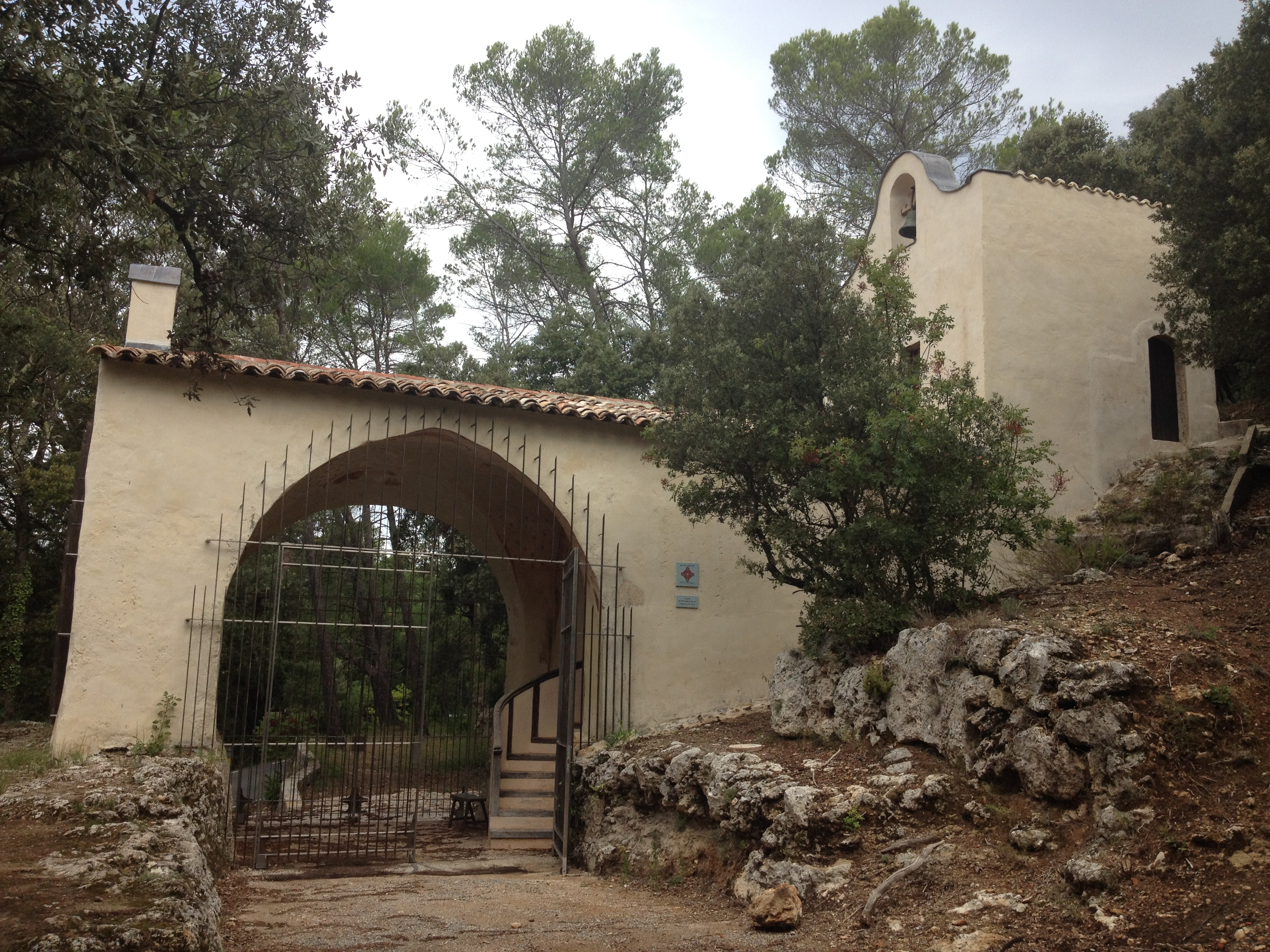
Notre-Dame de Benva

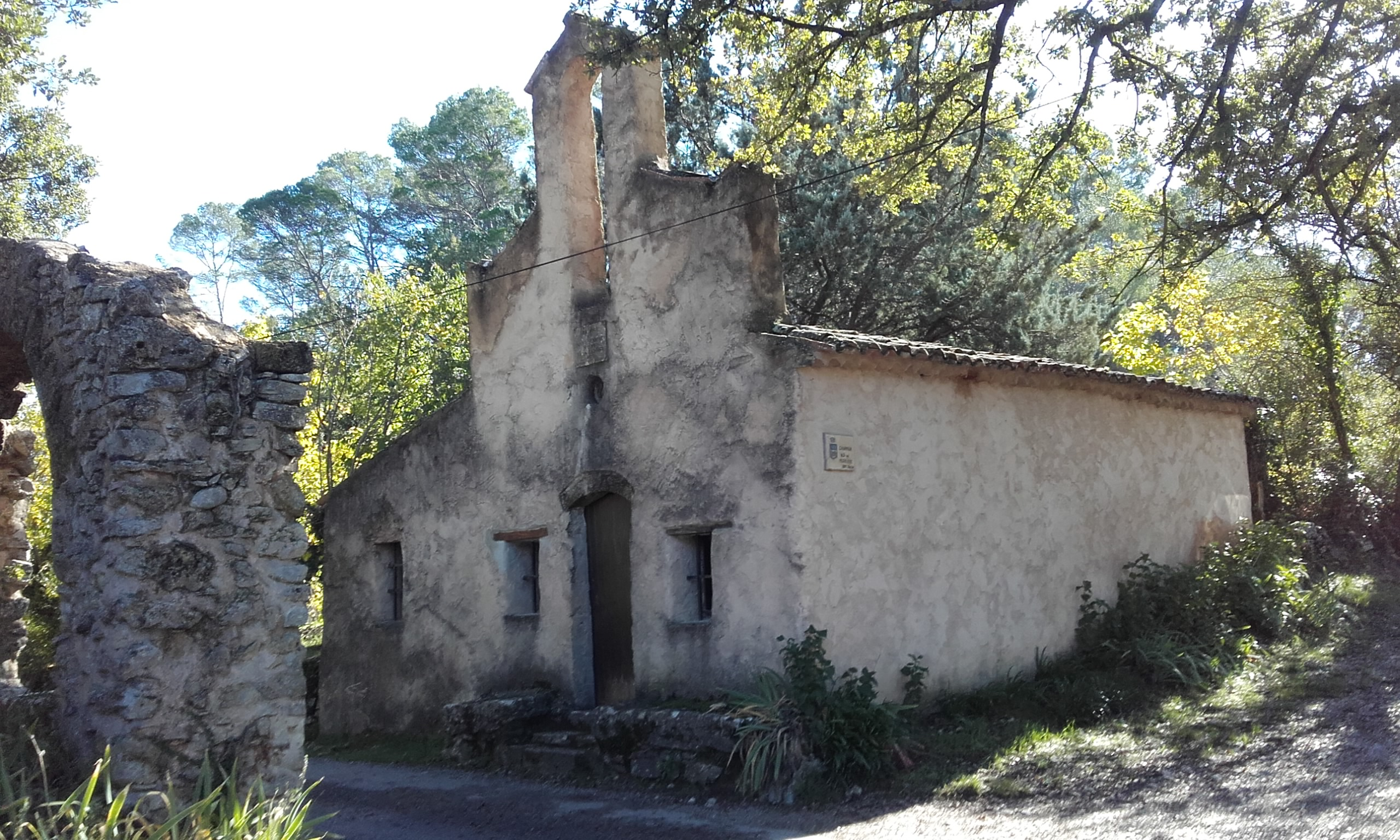
Notre-Dame de Florieye.

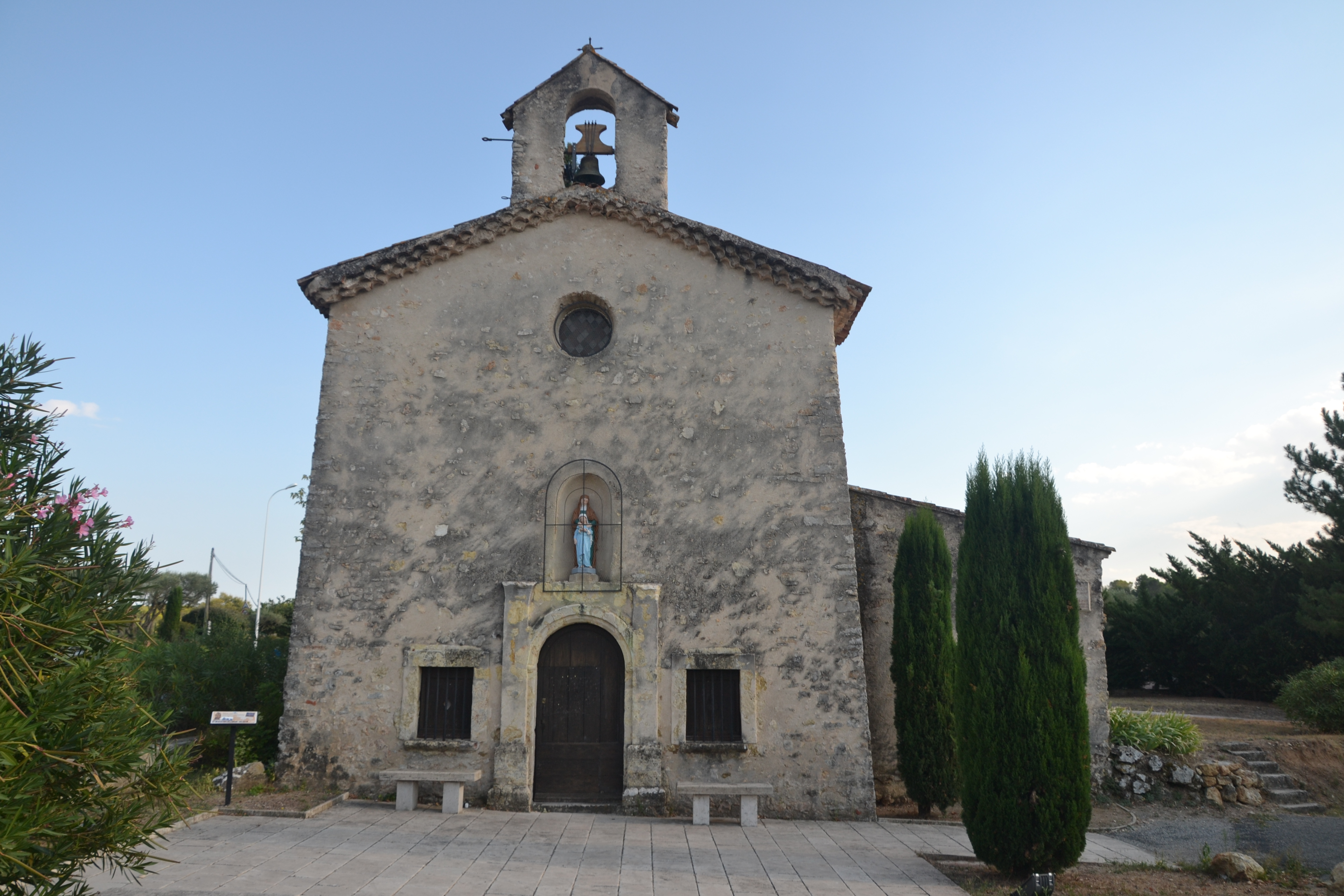
Chapel of Sainte Anne.

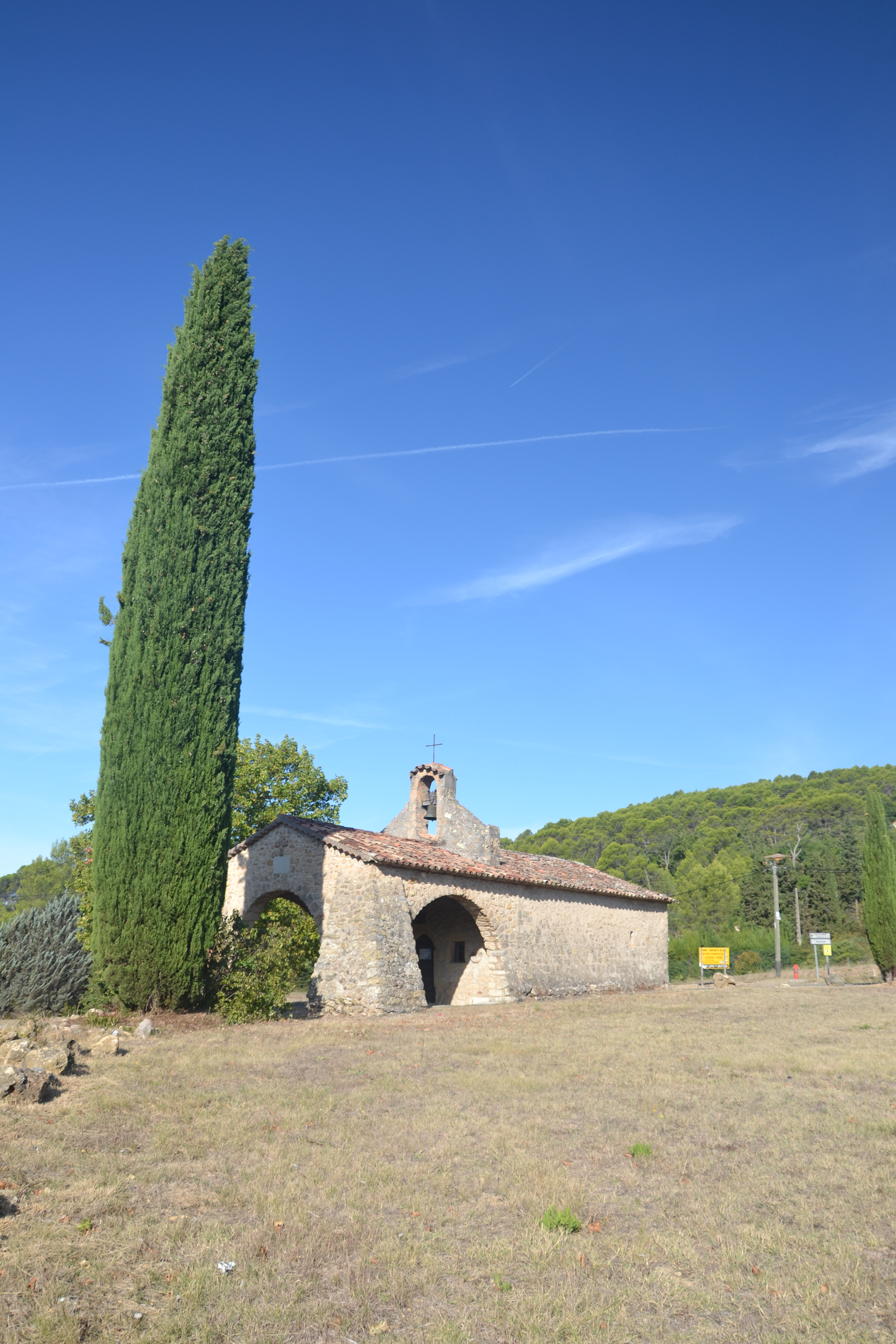
Chapel of Saint Jaume.

=== Other monuments ===
As mentioned in the section on pre-history, Bronze Age tombs (particularly the dolmen of Pey-cervier) and a pre-Roman fortification (oppidum) have been found in the area, although not much remains, particularly of the latter.

== Daily life ==
- Lorgues has a strong scholastic presence, with two nursery and two primary schools. The secondary schools (collège and lycée) draw in students from other towns and villages in the area.
- There is a long tradition of active societies in Lorgues, particularly those offering different kinds of sports, but there are also many cultural and social associations.
- The town is well supplied with doctors, dentists, nurses and other health professionals, and contains a number of pharmacies. The nearest hospital is in Draguignan.
- The Catholic parish of Lorgues includes Saint-Antonin and Le Thoronet. The main parish church is the large collegiate church of Saint Martin, which dominates the town. The Protestants have used the small chapel of Saint Honorat since 1980 for monthly services. An old shepherd's dwelling (bergerie) has been transformed into a mosque for Muslim worship.

== See also ==
=== Bibliography ===
- Courdouan, François (1864). Histoire de La Commune de Lorgues, Aubry Paris. (Available as a free e-book on books.google.fr.)
- Marcel, Alain (2017). Lorgues: Le Temps retrouvé, Editions Equinoxe. (A limited edition book with excellent illustrations).
- Marcel, Alain (2009). Lorgues, Mémoire en images Tome 1, Editions Sutton.
- Marcel, Alain (2011). Lorgues, Mémoire en images Tome 2, Editions Sutton.
- Marcel, Alain (2022). Marius Trussy, le rival de Mistral, Editions Gaussen
- Nardin, Louis (1972). Lorgues cité franche de Provence. Available as a low price download at https://gallica.bnf.fr/ark:/12148/bpt6k33254491.texteImage

=== Related articles ===
- Communes of the Var department
