= 2010 Var floods =

2010 multiple floods in Var, France

- The location of the department of the Var within France

Meteorological history
- Duration: 15–16 June 2010

Overall effects
- Fatalities: 27
- Damage: Unknown
- Areas affected: Var, France

The 2010 Var floods were the result of heavy rainfall in southern France that caused severe floods in the department of the Var in the evening of 15 June 2010. As well as generalized flooding, there were also flash floods. Meteorologists say the floods are the worst in the region since 1827, with more than 400 mm (16 in) of rain falling in less than 24 hours. At least 25 people were killed. The worst hit municipalities were Les Arcs, Figanières, Roquebrune-sur-Argens, Trans-en-Provence, and the subprefecture of Draguignan.

== Damage ==
Over 1,000 people were evacuated from their houses, and 175,000 houses were left without electricity. In Draguignan, 236 inmates had to be evacuated when two floors of the prison were flooded. All 440 inmates from the prison were later transferred to other prisons in Cannes, Grasse, Metz, Marseille and Nice. Helicopters were used to evacuate people from the rooftops of their houses. In Frejus, over 1,500 people were rescued by the use of inflatable boats or helicopters. Many tourists were trapped in campsites along the Argens river. People were urged to drink bottled water as it was feared that water supplies in the area were contaminated by the floodwater.

Prime Minister François Fillon announced on 18 June that a declaration of natural catastrophe would be issued "as soon as possible": it will concern the cantons of Besse-sur-Issole, Callas, Cotignac, Draguignan, Fayence, Fréjus, Lorgues, Le Luc and Le Muy.

== Reactions ==
Interior Minister Brice Hortefeux stated that he expected the death toll to rise further. President Nicolas Sarkozy expressed his condolences to the victims' families and his support for the rescue teams. He stated that he planned to visit the area on 21 June 2010.

The French Red Cross launched an appeal, stating that the appeal was strictly for cash donations and not for clothing or furniture.

== Deaths ==
A total of 27 people died: twelve people were killed in Draguignan, four in Trans-en-Provence, three at La Motte, two in Roquebrune-sur-Argens and Saint-Aygulf (in the commune of Fréjus) and one each Montauroux and at Le Luc.

The floods also killed about 3000 sheep and about 100 horses, leading to problems in disposing of the carcasses, many of which had been swept into a wooded area and were trapped in trees.

== Transport disruption ==
A High Speed Train travelling between Nice and Lille was stranded by the floodwaters near Le Luc. There were over 300 people on board. The railway between Toulon and Fréjus was closed. Services were reinstated between Toulon and Les Arcs and also between Nice and Saint-Raphaël on 17 June 2010. A bus service replaced trains between Les Arcs and Saint-Raphaël. Air travel in the region was also disrupted. Toulon-Hyères Airport closed in the evening of 15 June 2010, and reopened the following morning.

== See also ==
- Lynmouth disaster (1952)
- Boscastle flood (2004)
- Central European floods (2010)
- 2010 Nigerien floods
- 2010 Milwaukee flood
- Global storm activity of mid-2010
- The European winter cold snap of 2010-2011
- Cyclone Carmen
- British Winter of 2010
- 2010 Albania floods
