= Arrondissement of Draguignan =

Draguignan
- Arrondissement
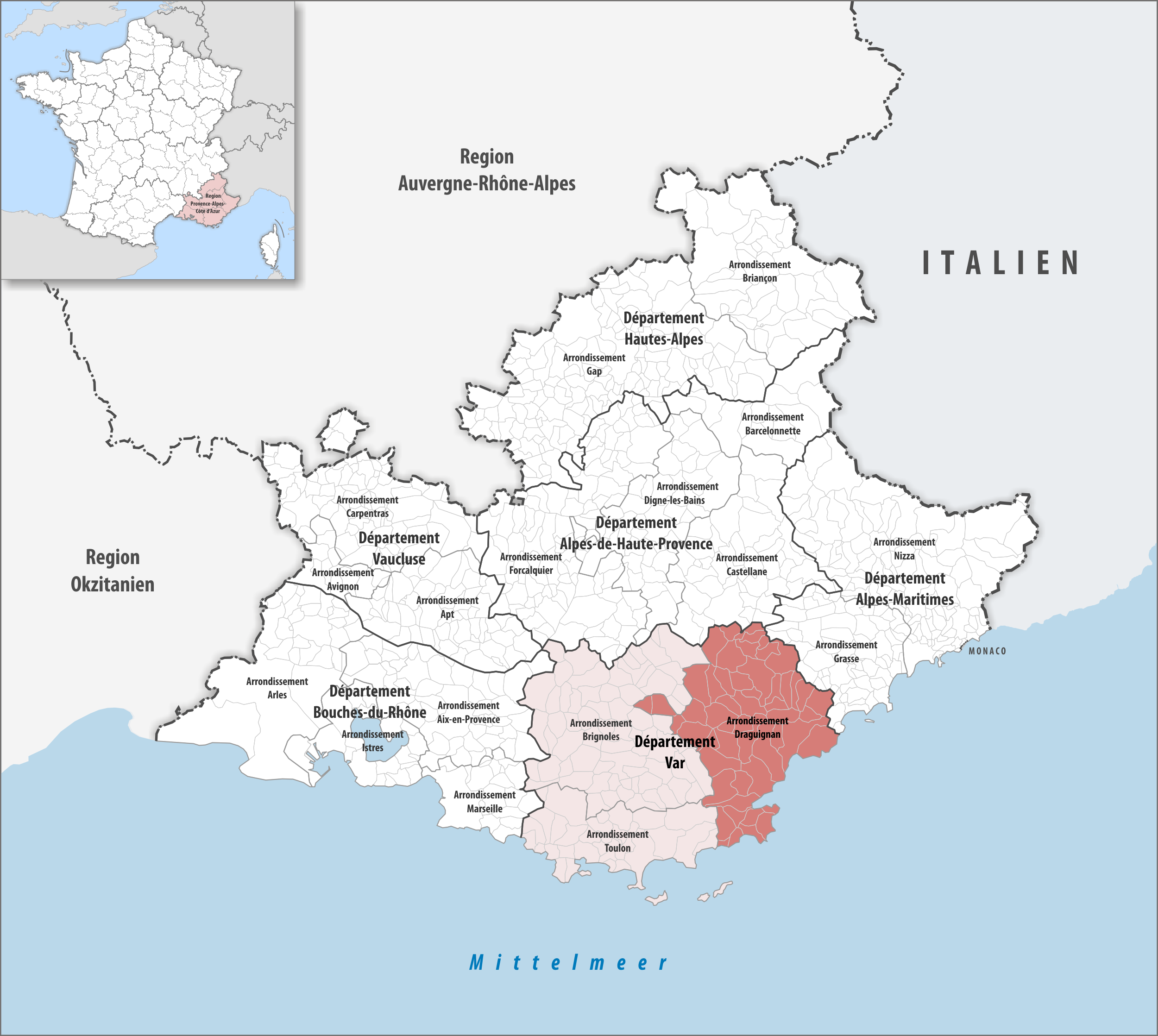
- Location within the region Provence-Alpes-Côte d'Azur
- Coordinates: 43.53°N 6.47°E
- Country: France
- Region: Provence-Alpes-Côte d'Azur
- Department: Var
- No. of communes: {{{nbcomm}}}
- Area: 2,220.8 km^{2} (857.5 sq mi)
- Population (2023): 328,191
  - Density: 147.78/km^{2} (382.75/sq mi)
- INSEE code: 831

The arrondissement of Draguignan (French: arrondissement de Draguignan, [aʁɔ̃dismɑ̃ də dʁaɡiɲɑ̃]; Occitan: arrondiment de Draguinhan) is an arrondissement of France in the Var department, Provence-Alpes-Côte d'Azur region. It has 54 communes. Its population is 316,136 (2021), and its area is 2,220.8 km^{2} (857.5 sq mi).

== Composition ==
The communes of the arrondissement of Draguignan, and their INSEE codes, are:

1. Les Adrets-de-l'Estérel (83001)
2. Ampus (83003)
3. Les Arcs (83004)
4. Bagnols-en-Forêt (83008)
5. Bargème (83010)
6. Bargemon (83011)
7. La Bastide (83013)
8. Le Bourguet (83020)
9. Brenon (83022)
10. Callas (83028)
11. Callian (83029)
12. Cavalaire-sur-Mer (83036)
13. Châteaudouble (83038)
14. Châteauvieux (83040)
15. Claviers (83041)
16. Cogolin (83042)
17. Comps-sur-Artuby (83044)
18. La Croix-Valmer (83048)
19. Draguignan (83050)
20. Fayence (83055)
21. Figanières (83056)
22. Flayosc (83058)
23. Fréjus (83061)
24. La Garde-Freinet (83063)
25. Gassin (83065)
26. Grimaud (83068)
27. Lorgues (83072)
28. La Martre (83074)
29. La Môle (83079)
30. Mons (83080)
31. Montauroux (83081)
32. Montferrat (83082)
33. La Motte (83085)
34. Le Muy (83086)
35. Le Plan-de-la-Tour (83094)
36. Puget-sur-Argens (83099)
37. Ramatuelle (83101)
38. Rayol-Canadel-sur-Mer (83152)
39. Roquebrune-sur-Argens (83107)
40. La Roque-Esclapon (83109)
41. Saint-Antonin-du-Var (83154)
42. Sainte-Maxime (83115)
43. Saint-Paul-en-Forêt (83117)
44. Saint-Raphaël (83118)
45. Saint-Tropez (83119)
46. Salernes (83121)
47. Seillans (83124)
48. Sillans-la-Cascade (83128)
49. Tanneron (83133)
50. Taradeau (83134)
51. Tourrettes (83138)
52. Trans-en-Provence (83141)
53. Trigance (83142)
54. Vidauban (83148)

== History ==
The arrondissement of Draguignan was created in 1800. At the January 2017 reorganisation of the arrondissements of Var, it received two communes from the arrondissement of Brignoles, and it lost six communes to the arrondissement of Brignoles.

As a result of the reorganisation of the cantons of France which came into effect in 2015, the borders of the cantons are no longer related to the borders of the arrondissements. The cantons of the arrondissement of Draguignan were, as of January 2015:

1. Callas
2. Comps-sur-Artuby
3. Draguignan
4. Fayence
5. Fréjus
6. Grimaud
7. Lorgues
8. Le Luc
9. Le Muy
10. Saint-Raphaël
11. Saint-Tropez
12. Salernes
