= Montferrat (disambiguation) =

Montferrat (in Italian, Monferrato) is a historical region in north Italy, later integrated in Piedmont.

Montferrat may also refer to:

- March of Montferrat, a former sovereign state, transformed into a Duchy in 1574 by the Gonzagas of Mantua, who acquired the territory

== Communes in France ==
- Montferrat, Isère, in the Isère département
- Montferrat, Var, in the Var département

== See also ==
- List of rulers of Montferrat
