= Communauté d'agglomération Dracénie Provence Verdon =

Dracénie Provence Verdon
- Communauté d'agglomération
- Interactive map of Dracénie Provence Verdon
- Coordinates: 43°32′N 06°28′E
- Country: France
- Region: Provence-Alpes-Côte d'Azur
- Department: Var
- No. of communes: {{{nbcomm}}}
- Established: 2000

Government
  - President (2020 - Present): Richard Strambio
- Area: 914.7 km^{2} (353.2 sq mi)
- Population (2022): 113,515
  - Density: 124.1/km^{2} (321.4/sq mi)
- Website: www.dracenie.com

Communauté d'agglomération Dracénie Provence Verdon is an intercommunal structure, centred on the city of Draguignan. It is located in the Var department, in the Provence-Alpes-Côte d'Azur region, southeastern France. It was created in October 2000. Its seat is in Draguignan. Its area is 914.7 km^{2}. Its population was 113,515 in 2022, of which 40,789 in Draguignan proper.

== Composition ==
The communauté d'agglomération consists of the following 23 communes:

1. Ampus
2. Les Arcs
3. Bargème
4. Bargemon
5. La Bastide
6. Callas
7. Châteaudouble
8. Claviers
9. Comps-sur-Artuby
10. Draguignan
11. Figanières
12. Flayosc
13. Lorgues
14. Montferrat
15. La Motte
16. Le Muy
17. La Roque-Esclapon
18. Saint-Antonin-du-Var
19. Salernes
20. Sillans-la-Cascade
21. Taradeau
22. Trans-en-Provence
23. Vidauban
