= Claviers =

- Commune
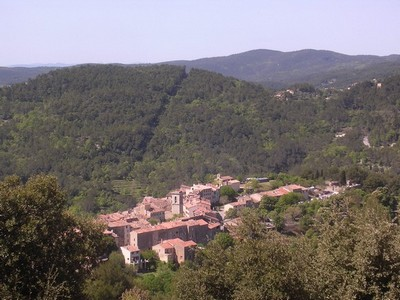
- The village of Claviers

- Coat of arms
- Location of Claviers
- Location within France Location within Provence-Alpes-Côte d'Azur
- Coordinates: 43°36′04″N 6°33′50″E
- Country: France
- Region: Provence-Alpes-Côte d'Azur
- Department: Var
- Arrondissement: Draguignan
- Canton: Flayosc
- Intercommunality: CA Dracénie Provence Verdon

Government
  - Mayor (2020–2026): Gérald Pierrugues
- Area^{1}: 15.90 km^{2} (6.14 sq mi)
- Elevation: 400 m (1,300 ft)
- Highest elevation: 728 m (2,388 ft)
- Lowest elevation: 192 m (630 ft)
- Population (2023): 727
  - Density: 45.7/km^{2} (118/sq mi)
- Time zone: UTC+01:00 (CET)
  - Summer (DST): UTC+02:00 (CEST)
- INSEE/Postal code: 83041 /83830
- ^{1} French Land Register data, which excludes lakes, ponds, glaciers > 1 km^{2} (0.386 sq mi or 247 acres) and river estuaries.

Claviers (French pronunciation: [klavje]; Occitan: Clavier) is a commune in the Var department in the Provence-Alpes-Côte d'Azur region in southeastern France.

It is approximately 60 km (37 mi) west of Cannes.

== History ==
Like much of France, there is evidence of the Roman presence during the early part of the past millennium. There can be seen evidence of Gallo-Roman occupation south of Claviers.

== See also ==
- Communes of the Var department
