= La Bastide, Var =

La Bastide
- Commune
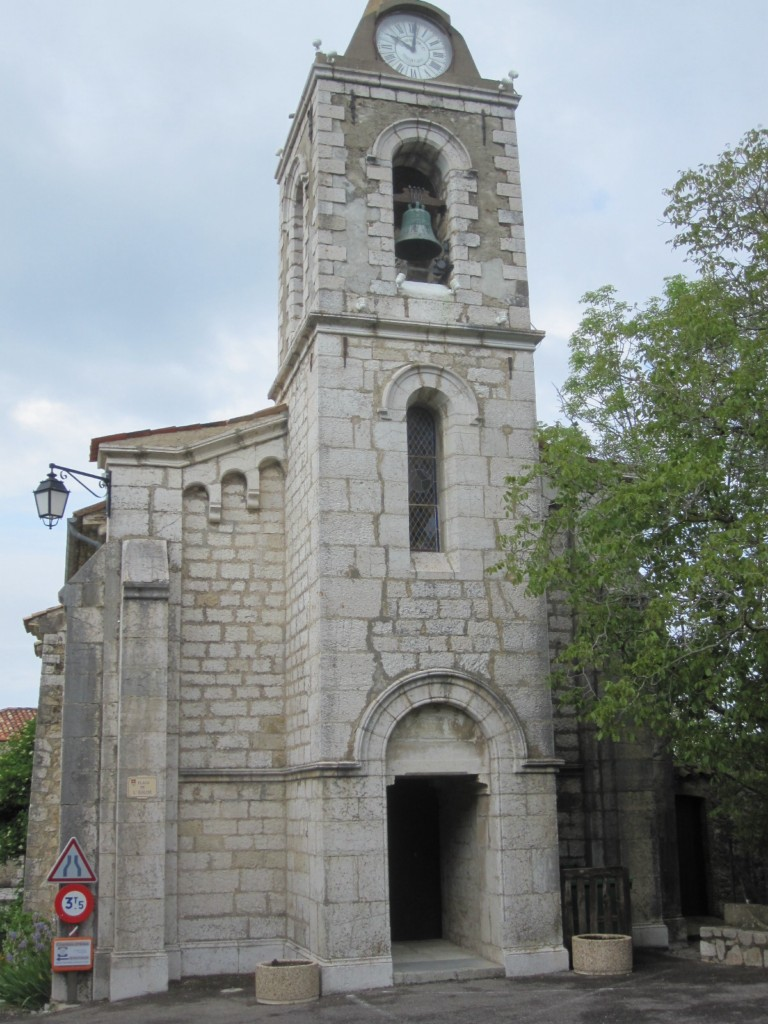
- The church of La Bastide

- Coat of arms
- Location of La Bastide
- Location within France Location within Provence-Alpes-Côte d'Azur
- Coordinates: 43°44′06″N 6°37′31″E
- Country: France
- Region: Provence-Alpes-Côte d'Azur
- Department: Var
- Arrondissement: Draguignan
- Canton: Flayosc
- Intercommunality: CA Dracénie Provence Verdon

Government
  - Mayor (2020–2026): Claude Marin
- Area^{1}: 11.76 km^{2} (4.54 sq mi)
- Elevation: 1,025 m (3,363 ft)
- Highest elevation: 1,686 m (5,531 ft)
- Lowest elevation: 928 m (3,045 ft)
- Population (2023): 227
  - Density: 19.3/km^{2} (50.0/sq mi)
- Time zone: UTC+01:00 (CET)
  - Summer (DST): UTC+02:00 (CEST)
- INSEE/Postal code: 83013 /83840
- ^{1} French Land Register data, which excludes lakes, ponds, glaciers > 1 km^{2} (0.386 sq mi or 247 acres) and river estuaries.

La Bastide (French pronunciation: [la bastid]; Occitan: La Bastida) is a commune in the Var department in the Provence-Alpes-Côte d'Azur region in southeastern France.

== See also ==
- Communes of the Var department
