= Sillans-la-Cascade =

Sillans-la-Cascade Silan (Occitan)
- Commune
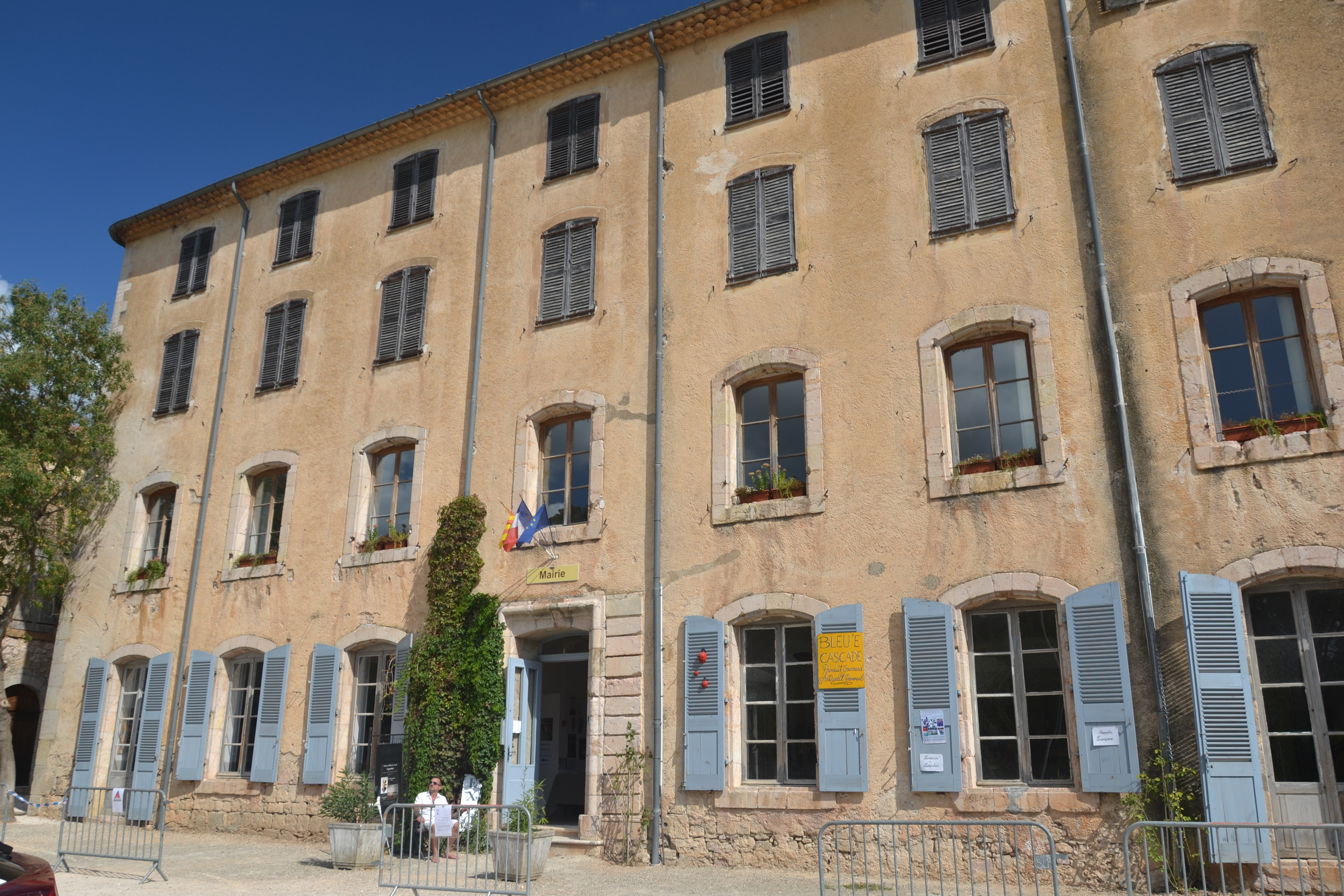
- Sillans-la-Cascade Town Hall

- Coat of arms
- Location of Sillans-la-Cascade
- Location within France Location within Provence-Alpes-Côte d'Azur
- Coordinates: 43°34′07″N 6°10′49″E
- Country: France
- Region: Provence-Alpes-Côte d'Azur
- Department: Var
- Arrondissement: Draguignan
- Canton: Flayosc
- Intercommunality: CA Dracénie Provence Verdon

Government
  - Mayor (2020–2026): Christophe Carrière
- Area^{1}: 20.17 km^{2} (7.79 sq mi)
- Elevation: 383 m (1,257 ft)
- Highest elevation: 476 m (1,562 ft)
- Lowest elevation: 267 m (876 ft)
- Population (2023): 787
  - Density: 39.0/km^{2} (101/sq mi)
- Time zone: UTC+01:00 (CET)
  - Summer (DST): UTC+02:00 (CEST)
- INSEE/Postal code: 83128 /83690
- ^{1} French Land Register data, which excludes lakes, ponds, glaciers > 1 km^{2} (0.386 sq mi or 247 acres) and river estuaries.

Sillans-la-Cascade (French pronunciation: [sijɑ̃ la kaskad]; Occitan: Silan la Cascada) is a commune in the Var department in the Provence-Alpes-Côte d'Azur region of Southeastern France. As of 2023, the population of the commune was 787.

== Tourism ==
As the commune's name suggests, it has a spectacular waterfall: the Cascade de Sillans, 44 metres (48 yards) high.

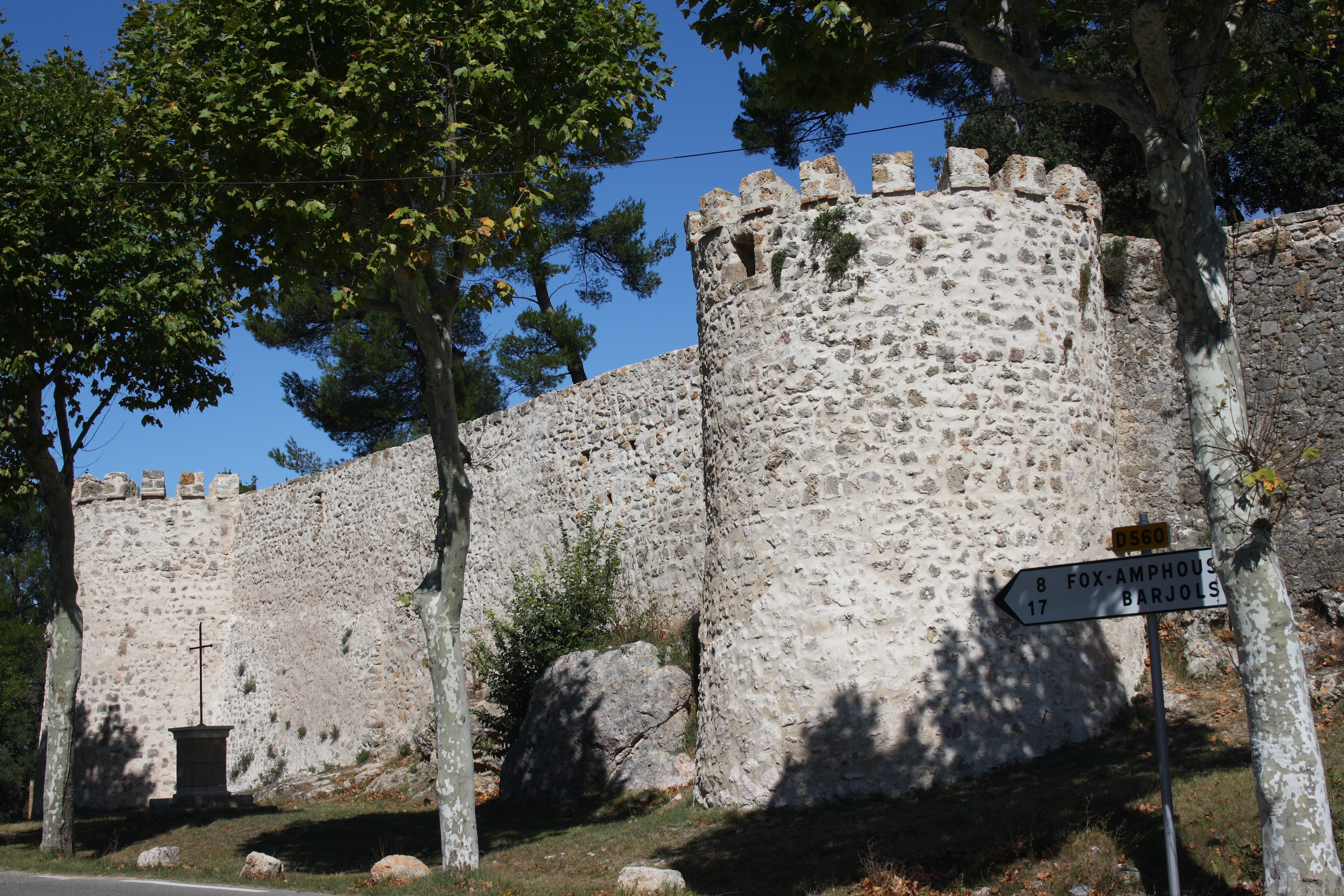
Château in Sillans-la-Cascade

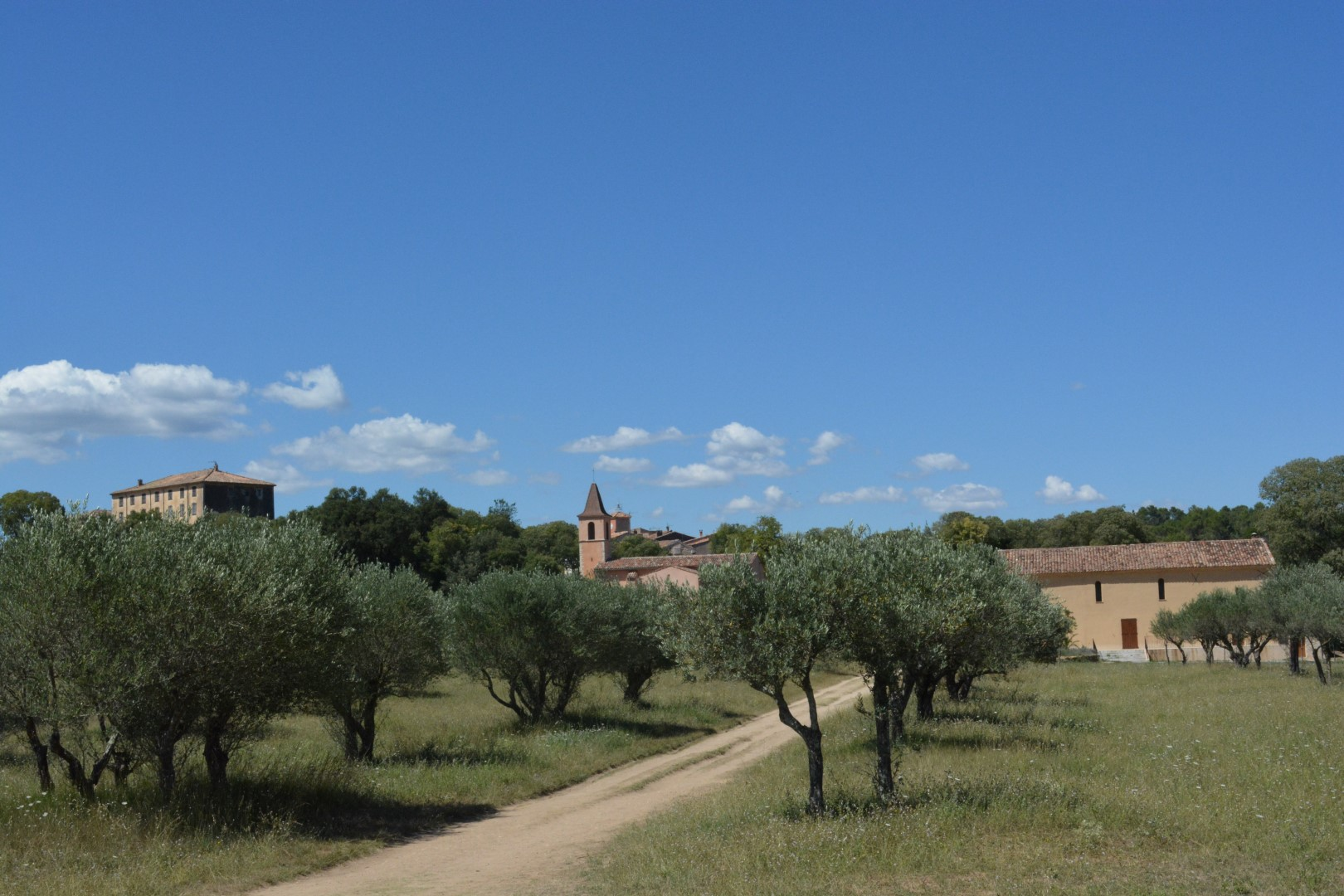
General view

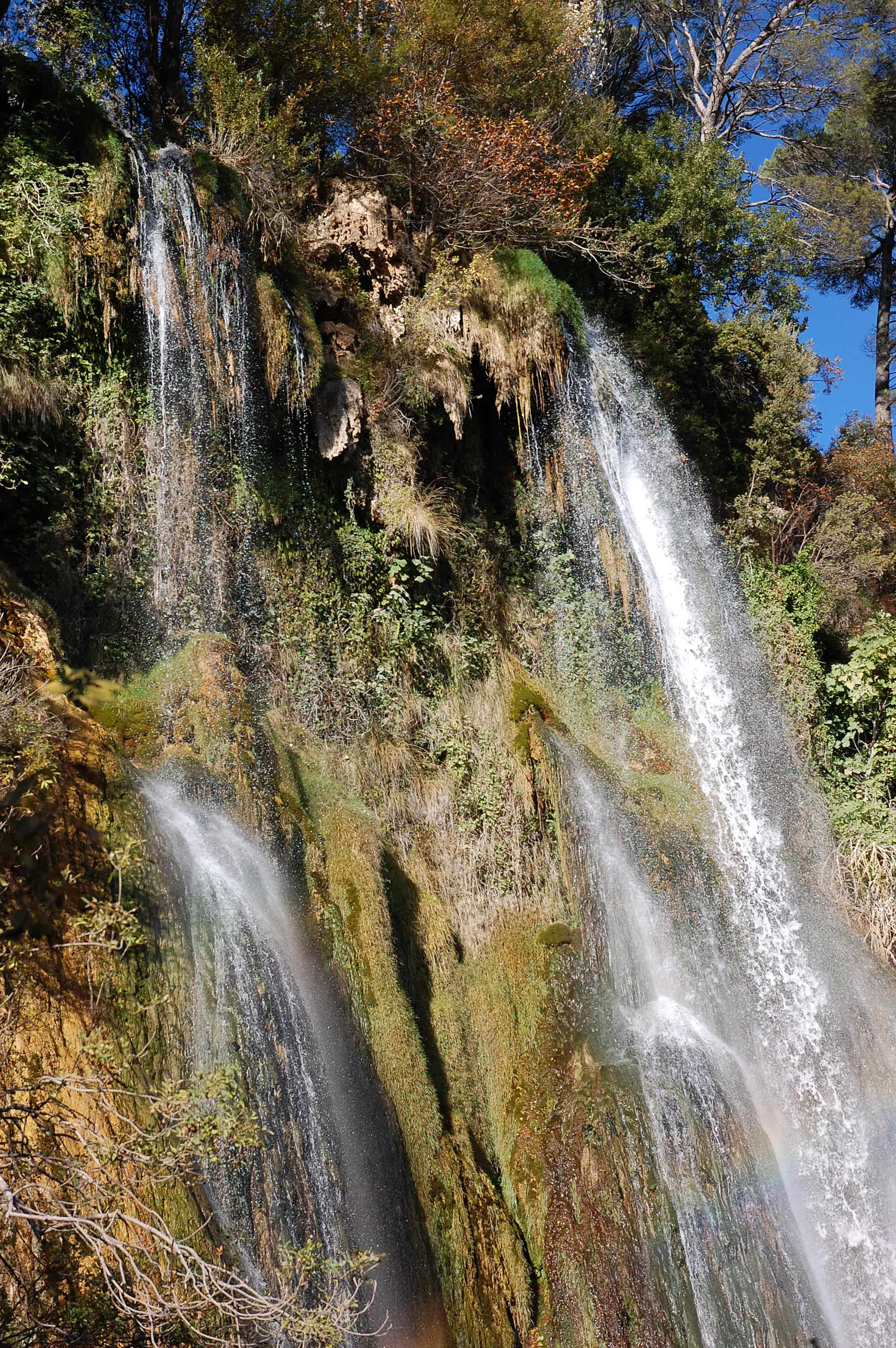
Cascade de Sillans

== See also ==
- Communes of the Var department
