= Taradeau =

Taradeau Taradèu (Occitan)
- Commune
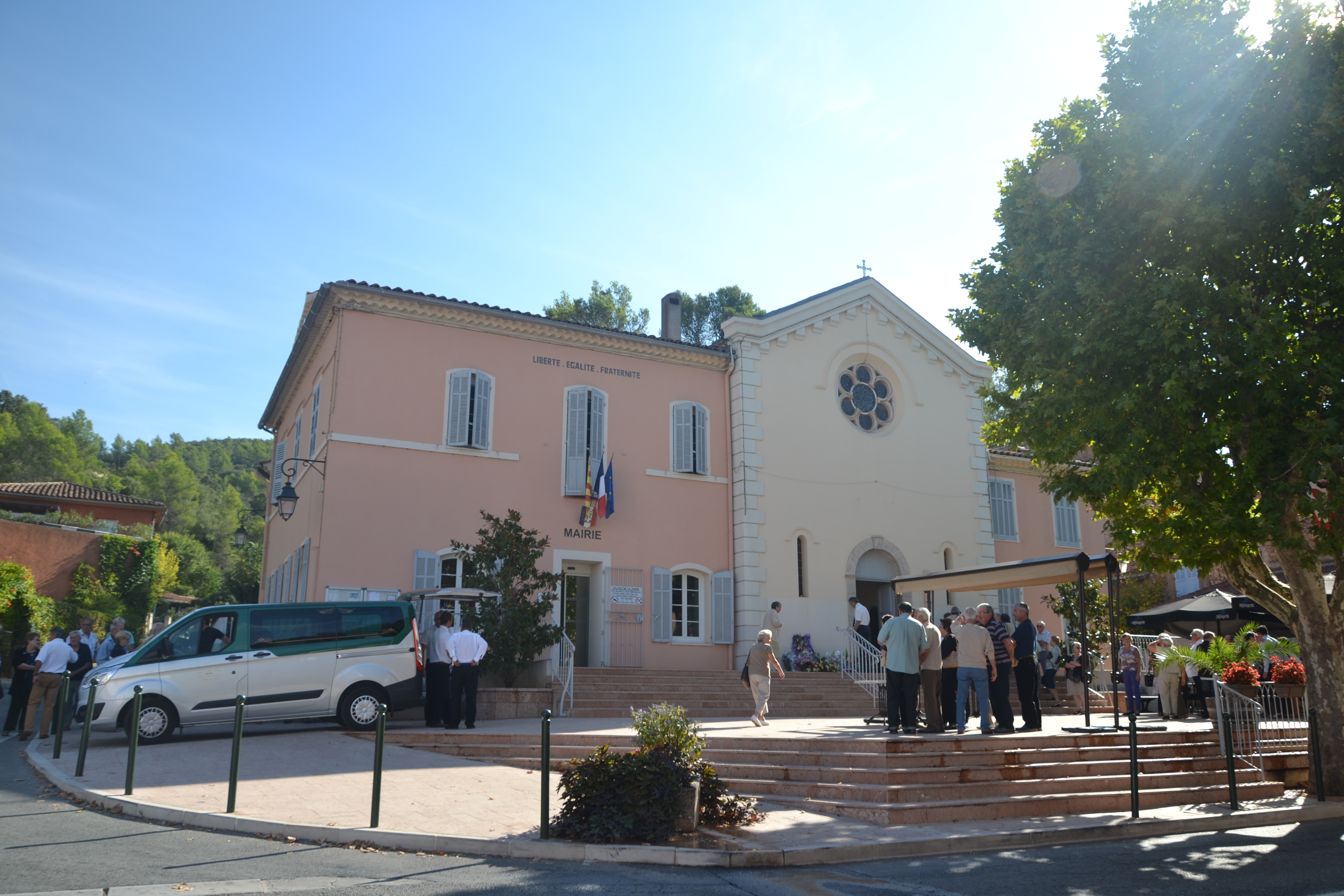
- The town hall and church in Taradeau

- Coat of arms
- Location of Taradeau
- Location within France Location within Provence-Alpes-Côte d'Azur
- Coordinates: 43°27′14″N 6°25′38″E
- Country: France
- Region: Provence-Alpes-Côte d'Azur
- Department: Var
- Arrondissement: Draguignan
- Canton: Vidauban
- Intercommunality: CA Dracénie Provence Verdon

Government
  - Mayor (2020–2026): Albert David
- Area^{1}: 17.31 km^{2} (6.68 sq mi)
- Highest elevation: 259 m (850 ft)
- Lowest elevation: 44 m (144 ft)
- Population (2023): 1,945
  - Density: 112.4/km^{2} (291.0/sq mi)
- Demonym: Taradéens
- Time zone: UTC+01:00 (CET)
  - Summer (DST): UTC+02:00 (CEST)
- INSEE/Postal code: 83134 /83460
- Website: mairie-taradeau.fr
- ^{1} French Land Register data, which excludes lakes, ponds, glaciers > 1 km^{2} (0.386 sq mi or 247 acres) and river estuaries.

Taradeau (French pronunciation: [taʁado]; Occitan: Taradèu) is a commune in the Var department in the Provence-Alpes-Côte d'Azur region in Southeastern France. As of 2023, the population of the commune was 1,945.

== History ==
Ruins of an oppidum were discovered in 1969 in the commune, dating back to the 1st century. The site marks a Celto-Ligurian settlement of the Verucini tribe. In the 12th century, the French built a watch tower above the village named the Tour du Taradel, which is now open to visitors.

The main religion in Taradeau is Roman Catholic.

== Facilities ==
Taradeau is just north of the larger town of Vidauban. Taradeau has a number of small businesses. In the village there is a restaurant, grocery shop, bakery, as well as tobacconist.

The village hosts a yearly circus around August time. Every year Taradeau also has a fireworks display on the local football field, celebrating the liberation of France.

== See also ==
- Communes of the Var department
