= Saint-Antonin-du-Var =

Saint-Antonin-du-Var Sant Antonin dau Var (Occitan)
- Commune
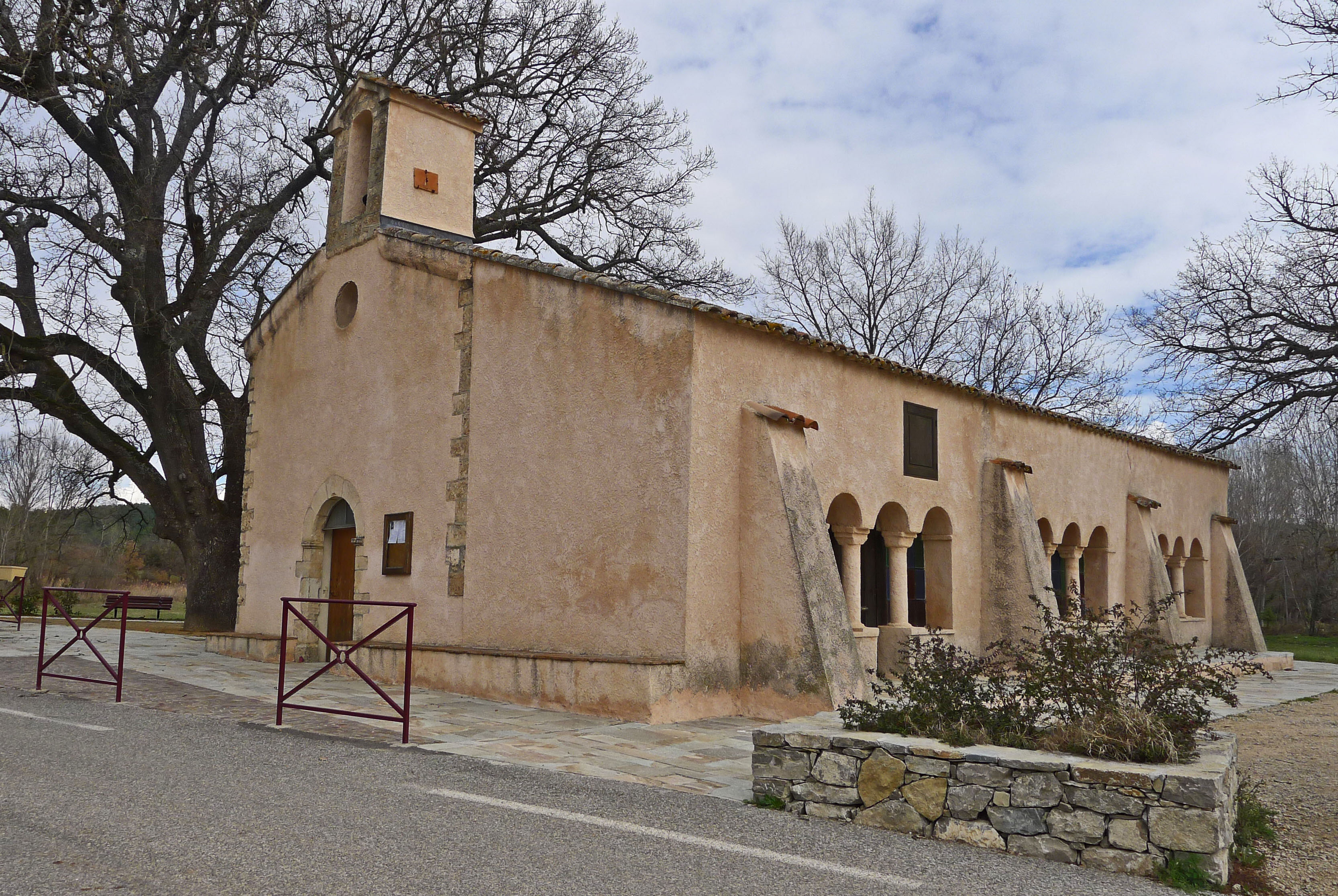
- The church of Saint-Antonin-du-Var

- Coat of arms
- Location of Saint-Antonin-du-Var
- Location within France Location within Provence-Alpes-Côte d'Azur
- Coordinates: 43°30′23″N 6°17′12″E
- Country: France
- Region: Provence-Alpes-Côte d'Azur
- Department: Var
- Arrondissement: Draguignan
- Canton: Brignoles
- Intercommunality: CA Dracénie Provence Verdon

Government
  - Mayor (2020–2026): Serge Baldecchi
- Area^{1}: 17.64 km^{2} (6.81 sq mi)
- Highest elevation: 396 m (1,299 ft)
- Lowest elevation: 95 m (312 ft)
- Population (2023): 870
  - Density: 49/km^{2} (130/sq mi)
- Time zone: UTC+01:00 (CET)
  - Summer (DST): UTC+02:00 (CEST)
- INSEE/Postal code: 83154 /83510
- ^{1} French Land Register data, which excludes lakes, ponds, glaciers > 1 km^{2} (0.386 sq mi or 247 acres) and river estuaries.

Saint-Antonin-du-Var (Occitan: Sant Antonin dau Var or simply Sant Antonin), commonly referred to simply as Saint-Antonin, is a commune in the Var department in the Provence-Alpes-Côte d'Azur region in Southeastern France. As of 2023, the population of the commune was 870.

== See also ==
- Communes of the Var department
