= Ampus =

- Commune
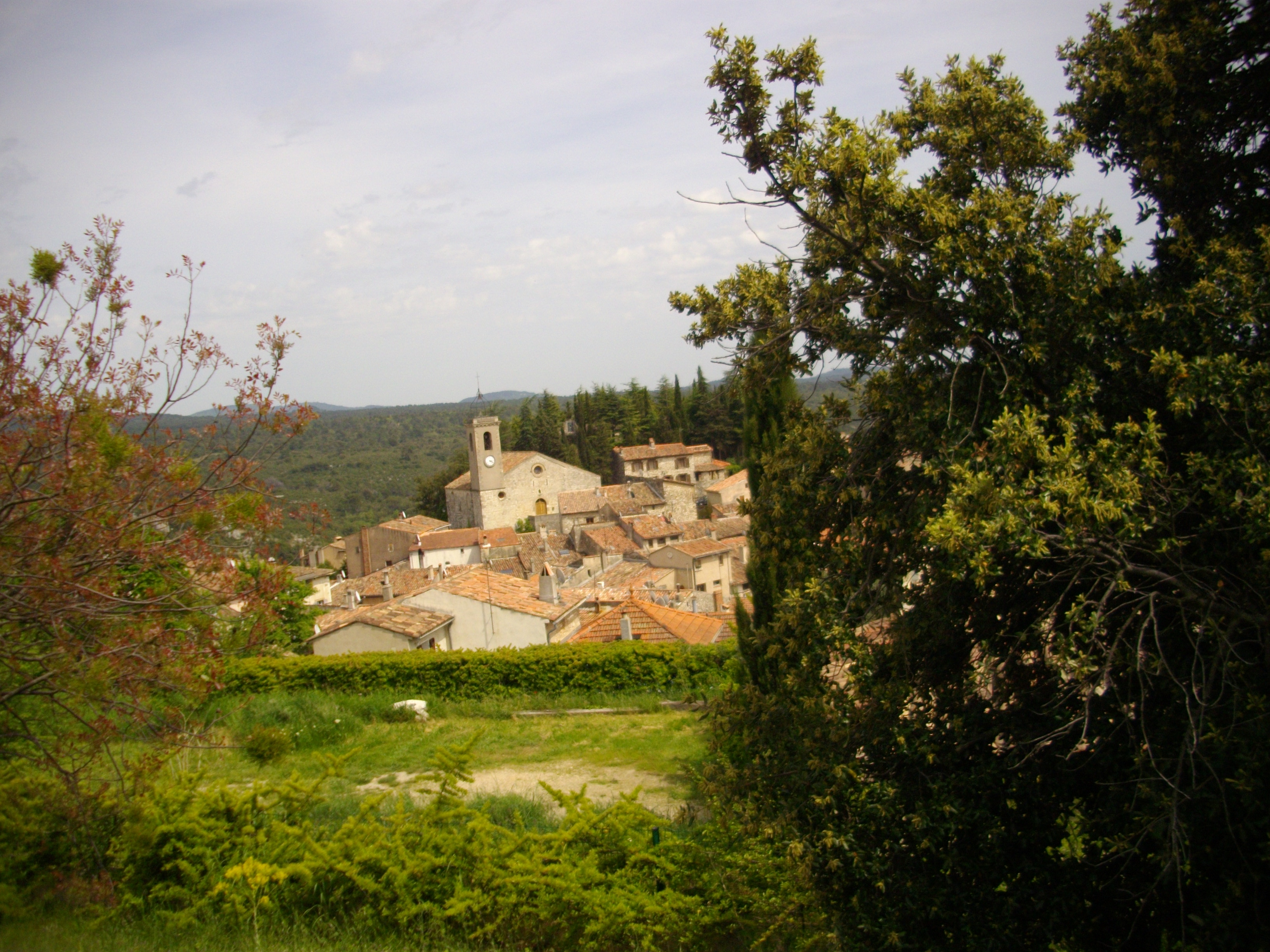
- A general view of the village of Ampus

- Coat of arms
- Location of Ampus
- Location within France Location within Provence-Alpes-Côte d'Azur
- Coordinates: 43°36′22″N 6°22′53″E
- Country: France
- Region: Provence-Alpes-Côte d'Azur
- Department: Var
- Arrondissement: Draguignan
- Canton: Flayosc
- Intercommunality: CA Dracénie Provence Verdon

Government
  - Mayor (2020–2026): Hugues Martin
- Area^{1}: 82.77 km^{2} (31.96 sq mi)
- Highest elevation: 1,174 m (3,852 ft)
- Lowest elevation: 205 m (673 ft)
- Population (2023): 919
  - Density: 11.1/km^{2} (28.8/sq mi)
- Time zone: UTC+01:00 (CET)
  - Summer (DST): UTC+02:00 (CEST)
- INSEE/Postal code: 83003 /83111
- ^{1} French Land Register data, which excludes lakes, ponds, glaciers > 1 km^{2} (0.386 sq mi or 247 acres) and river estuaries.

Ampus (French pronunciation: [ɑ̃pys]; Occitan: Empus) is a commune in the Var department in the Provence-Alpes-Côte d'Azur region in southeastern France.

The hilltop village of Ampus is situated 14 km northwest of Draguignan.

== See also ==
- Communes of the Var department
