= Châteaudouble, Var =

Châteaudouble Castèudoble (Occitan)
- Commune
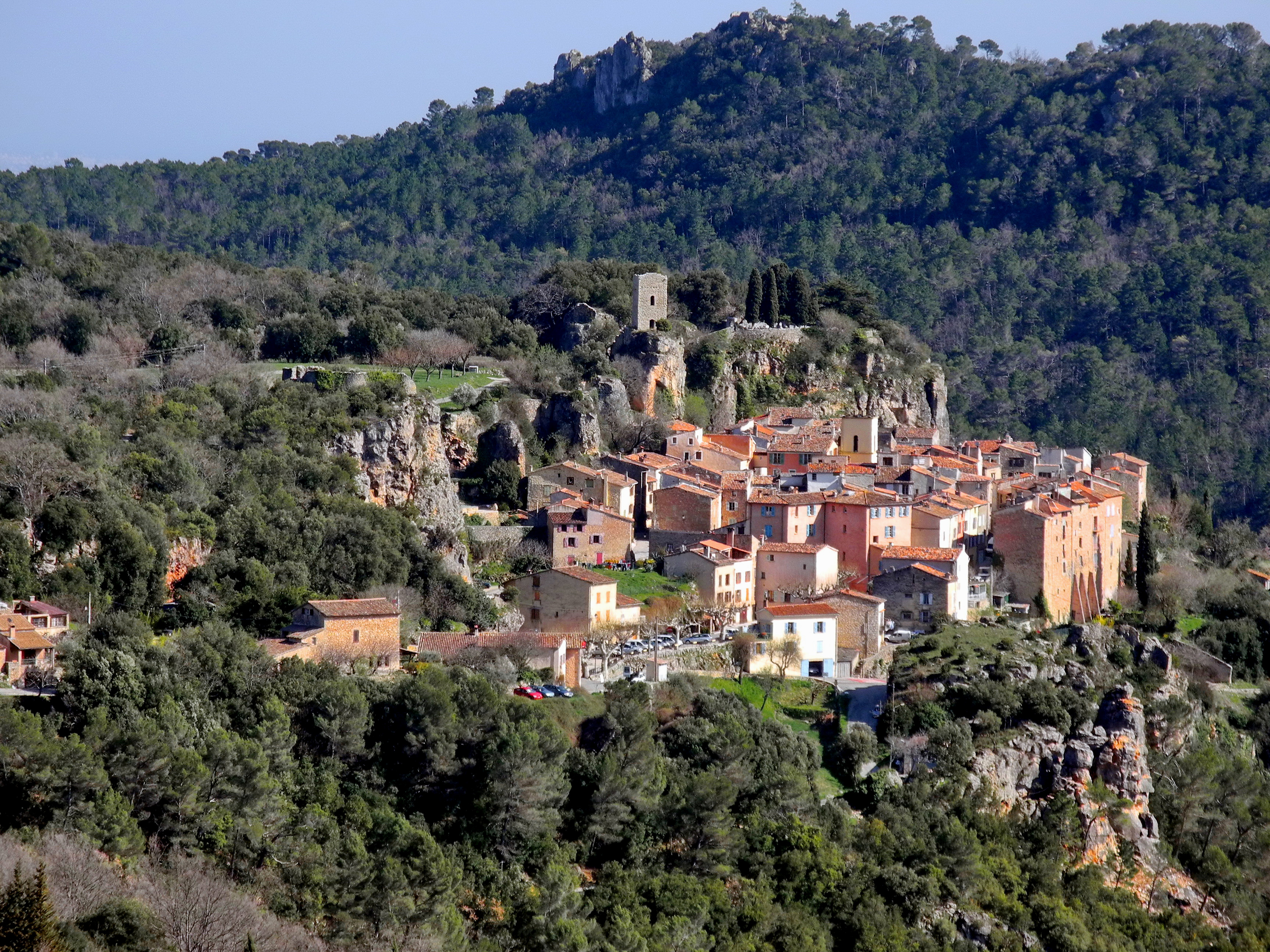
- A general view of the village

- Coat of arms
- Location of Châteaudouble
- Location within France Location within Provence-Alpes-Côte d'Azur
- Coordinates: 43°35′50″N 6°27′01″E
- Country: France
- Region: Provence-Alpes-Côte d'Azur
- Department: Var
- Arrondissement: Draguignan
- Canton: Flayosc
- Intercommunality: CA Dracénie Provence Verdon

Government
  - Mayor (2020–2026): Georges Rouvier
- Area^{1}: 40.91 km^{2} (15.80 sq mi)
- Highest elevation: 1,039 m (3,409 ft)
- Lowest elevation: 210 m (690 ft)
- Population (2023): 476
  - Density: 11.6/km^{2} (30.1/sq mi)
- Time zone: UTC+01:00 (CET)
  - Summer (DST): UTC+02:00 (CEST)
- INSEE/Postal code: 83038 /83300
- ^{1} French Land Register data, which excludes lakes, ponds, glaciers > 1 km^{2} (0.386 sq mi or 247 acres) and river estuaries.

Châteaudouble (French: [ʃɑtodubl]; Occitan: Castèudoble) is a commune in the Var department in the Provence-Alpes-Côte d'Azur region in southeastern France.

== See also ==
- Communes of the Var department
