= Bargemon =

- Commune
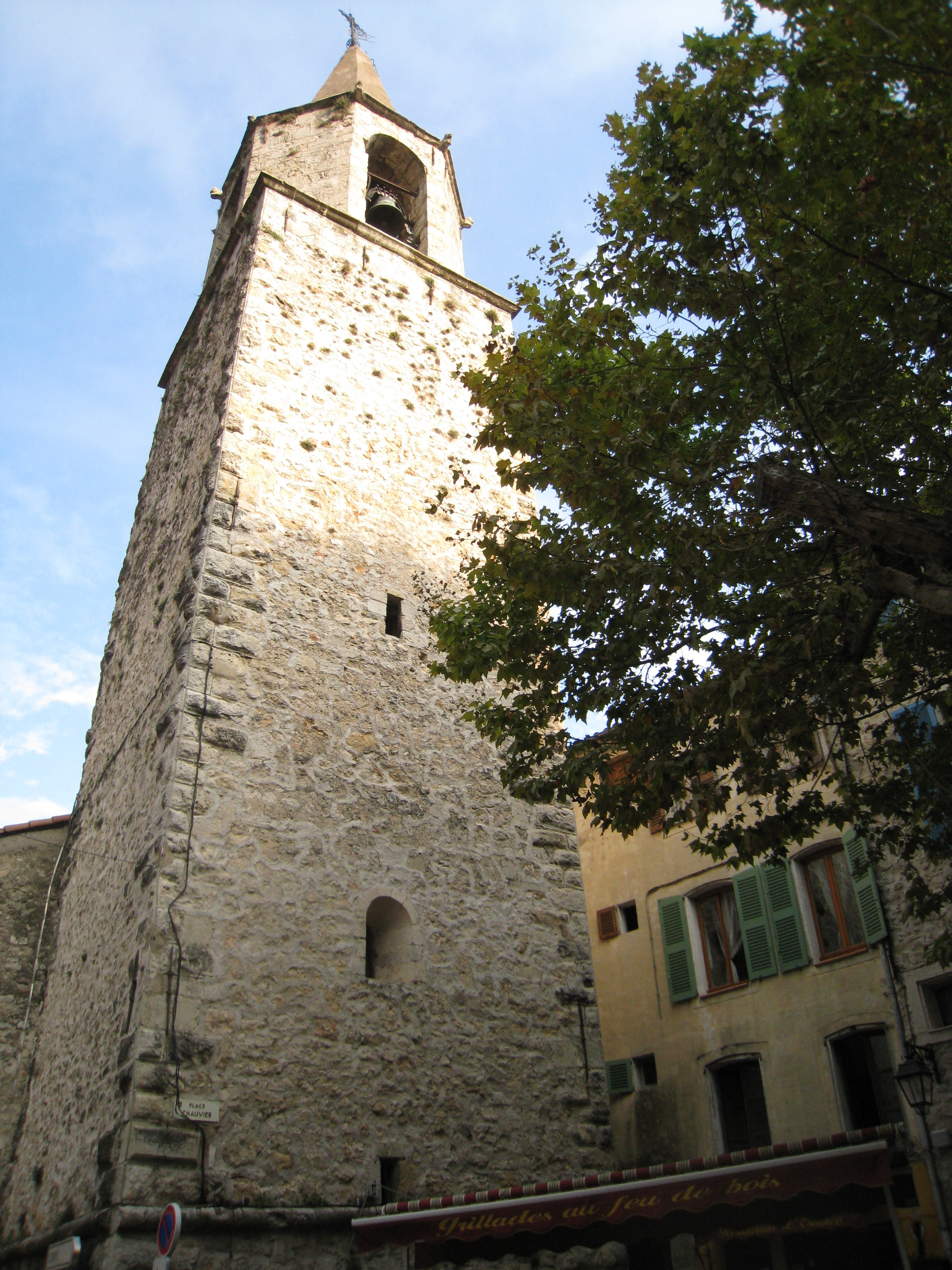
- The church of St Etienne

- Coat of arms
- Location of Bargemon
- Location within France Location within Provence-Alpes-Côte d'Azur
- Coordinates: 43°37′12″N 6°33′01″E
- Country: France
- Region: Provence-Alpes-Côte d'Azur
- Department: Var
- Arrondissement: Draguignan
- Canton: Flayosc
- Intercommunality: CA Dracénie Provence Verdon

Government
  - Mayor (2020–2026): Nadine Decarlis
- Area^{1}: 35.14 km^{2} (13.57 sq mi)
- Highest elevation: 1,089 m (3,573 ft)
- Lowest elevation: 319 m (1,047 ft)
- Population (2023): 1,433
  - Density: 40.78/km^{2} (105.6/sq mi)
- Time zone: UTC+01:00 (CET)
  - Summer (DST): UTC+02:00 (CEST)
- INSEE/Postal code: 83011 /83830
- ^{1} French Land Register data, which excludes lakes, ponds, glaciers > 1 km^{2} (0.386 sq mi or 247 acres) and river estuaries.

Bargemon (French pronunciation: [baʁʒəmɔ̃]; Occitan: Barjamon) is a commune in the Var department in the Provence-Alpes-Côte d'Azur region in southeastern France.

== Geography ==
=== Climate ===
Bargemon has a hot-summer Mediterranean climate (Köppen climate classification Csa). The average annual temperature in Bargemon is 13.9 °C (57.0 °F). The average annual rainfall is 1,019.2 mm (40.13 in) with October as the wettest month. The temperatures are highest on average in August, at around 23.1 °C (73.6 °F), and lowest in January, at around 6.3 °C (43.3 °F). The highest temperature ever recorded in Bargemon was 40.4 °C (104.7 °F) on 7 August 2003; the coldest temperature ever recorded was −9.6 °C (14.7 °F) on 30 December 1996.

Climate data for Bargemon (1991−2020 normals, extremes 1991−2007)
Month	Jan	Feb	Mar	Apr	May	Jun	Jul	Aug	Sep	Oct	Nov	Dec	Year
Record high °C (°F)	21.5 (70.7)	24.0 (75.2)	25.5 (77.9)	28.0 (82.4)	32.8 (91.0)	37.6 (99.7)	38.5 (101.3)	40.4 (104.7)	33.0 (91.4)	29.6 (85.3)	24.1 (75.4)	22.0 (71.6)	40.4 (104.7)
Mean daily maximum °C (°F)	12.4 (54.3)	13.8 (56.8)	16.7 (62.1)	18.7 (65.7)	23.6 (74.5)	27.8 (82.0)	31.1 (88.0)	31.3 (88.3)	25.8 (78.4)	20.5 (68.9)	15.5 (59.9)	12.7 (54.9)	20.9 (69.6)
Daily mean °C (°F)	6.3 (43.3)	6.9 (44.4)	9.6 (49.3)	11.7 (53.1)	16.2 (61.2)	20.0 (68.0)	22.8 (73.0)	23.1 (73.6)	18.6 (65.5)	14.5 (58.1)	9.9 (49.8)	7.0 (44.6)	13.9 (57.0)
Mean daily minimum °C (°F)	0.2 (32.4)	0.1 (32.2)	2.6 (36.7)	4.7 (40.5)	8.8 (47.8)	12.2 (54.0)	14.5 (58.1)	14.9 (58.8)	11.4 (52.5)	8.6 (47.5)	4.2 (39.6)	1.4 (34.5)	7.0 (44.6)
Record low °C (°F)	−8.5 (16.7)	−9.0 (15.8)	−8.3 (17.1)	−4.0 (24.8)	−1.0 (30.2)	5.0 (41.0)	7.7 (45.9)	6.9 (44.4)	2.5 (36.5)	−2.4 (27.7)	−7.2 (19.0)	−9.5 (14.9)	−9.5 (14.9)
Average precipitation mm (inches)	89.5 (3.52)	52.4 (2.06)	54.0 (2.13)	105.8 (4.17)	79.7 (3.14)	71.9 (2.83)	18.3 (0.72)	46.2 (1.82)	106.8 (4.20)	160.2 (6.31)	131.2 (5.17)	103.2 (4.06)	1,019.2 (40.13)
Average precipitation days (≥ 1.0 mm)	6.6	5.0	6.1	9.3	7.7	5.4	3.0	3.6	5.7	8.5	8.0	7.2	76.1
Source: Météo-France

== See also ==
- Communes of the Var department
- Ary Bitter
