= La Roque-Esclapon =

- Commune
- Coat of arms
- Location of La Roque-Esclapon
- Location within France Location within Provence-Alpes-Côte d'Azur
- Coordinates: 43°43′26″N 6°37′50″E
- Country: France
- Region: Provence-Alpes-Côte d'Azur
- Department: Var
- Arrondissement: Draguignan
- Canton: Flayosc
- Intercommunality: CA Dracénie Provence Verdon

Government
  - Mayor (2020–2026): Nathalie Perez Leroux
- Area^{1}: 26.98 km^{2} (10.42 sq mi)
- Elevation: 960 m (3,150 ft)
- Highest elevation: 1,700 m (5,600 ft)
- Lowest elevation: 904 m (2,966 ft)
- Population (2023): 261
  - Density: 9.67/km^{2} (25.1/sq mi)
- Time zone: UTC+01:00 (CET)
  - Summer (DST): UTC+02:00 (CEST)
- INSEE/Postal code: 83109 /83840
- ^{1} French Land Register data, which excludes lakes, ponds, glaciers > 1 km^{2} (0.386 sq mi or 247 acres) and river estuaries.

La Roque-Esclapon (French pronunciation: [la ʁɔk ɛsklapɔ̃]; Occitan: La Ròca Esclapon) is a commune in the Var department in the Provence-Alpes-Côte d'Azur region in southeastern France. As of 2023, the population of the commune was 261.

== See also ==
- Communes of the Var department
