= Montferrat, Var =

Montferrat
- Commune
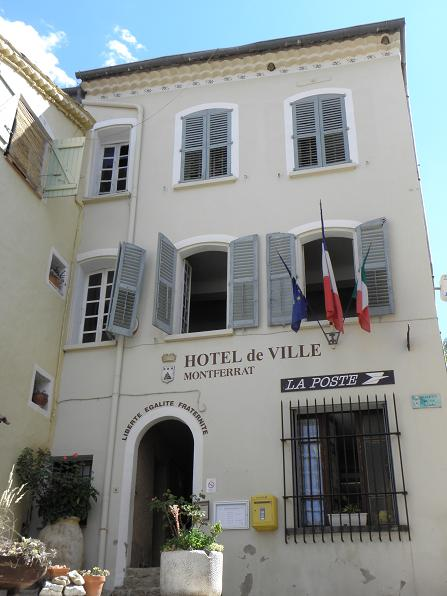
- The town hall of Montferrat

- Coat of arms
- Location of Montferrat
- Location within France Location within Provence-Alpes-Côte d'Azur
- Coordinates: 43°36′45″N 6°28′55″E
- Country: France
- Region: Provence-Alpes-Côte d'Azur
- Department: Var
- Arrondissement: Draguignan
- Canton: Flayosc
- Intercommunality: CA Dracénie Provence Verdon

Government
  - Mayor (2020–2026): Raymond Gras
- Area^{1}: 34.01 km^{2} (13.13 sq mi)
- Elevation: 480 m (1,570 ft)
- Highest elevation: 952 m (3,123 ft)
- Lowest elevation: 420 m (1,380 ft)
- Population (2023): 1,719
  - Density: 50.54/km^{2} (130.9/sq mi)
- Time zone: UTC+01:00 (CET)
  - Summer (DST): UTC+02:00 (CEST)
- INSEE/Postal code: 83082 /83131
- ^{1} French Land Register data, which excludes lakes, ponds, glaciers > 1 km^{2} (0.386 sq mi or 247 acres) and river estuaries.

Montferrat (French pronunciation: [mɔ̃fɛʁa]) is a commune in the Var department in the Provence-Alpes-Côte d'Azur region in southeastern France.

== See also ==
- Communes of the Var department

== Notable buildings ==
- Church of Saint-Roch.
- Chapelle Notre-Dame de Beauvoir, perched at 660m altitude.
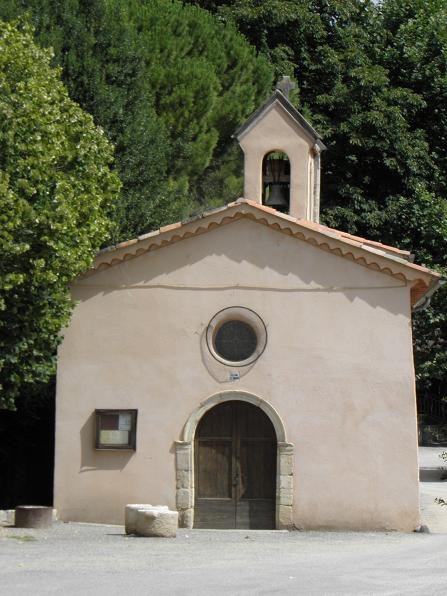
Church of St. Roch.

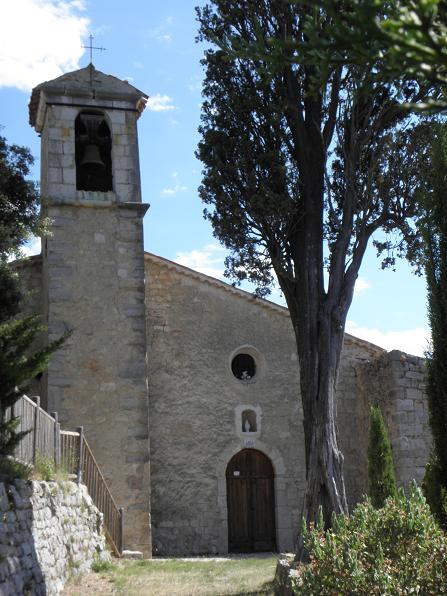
Chapelle Notre-Dame de Beauvoir.
