= Callas, Var =

Callas
- Commune
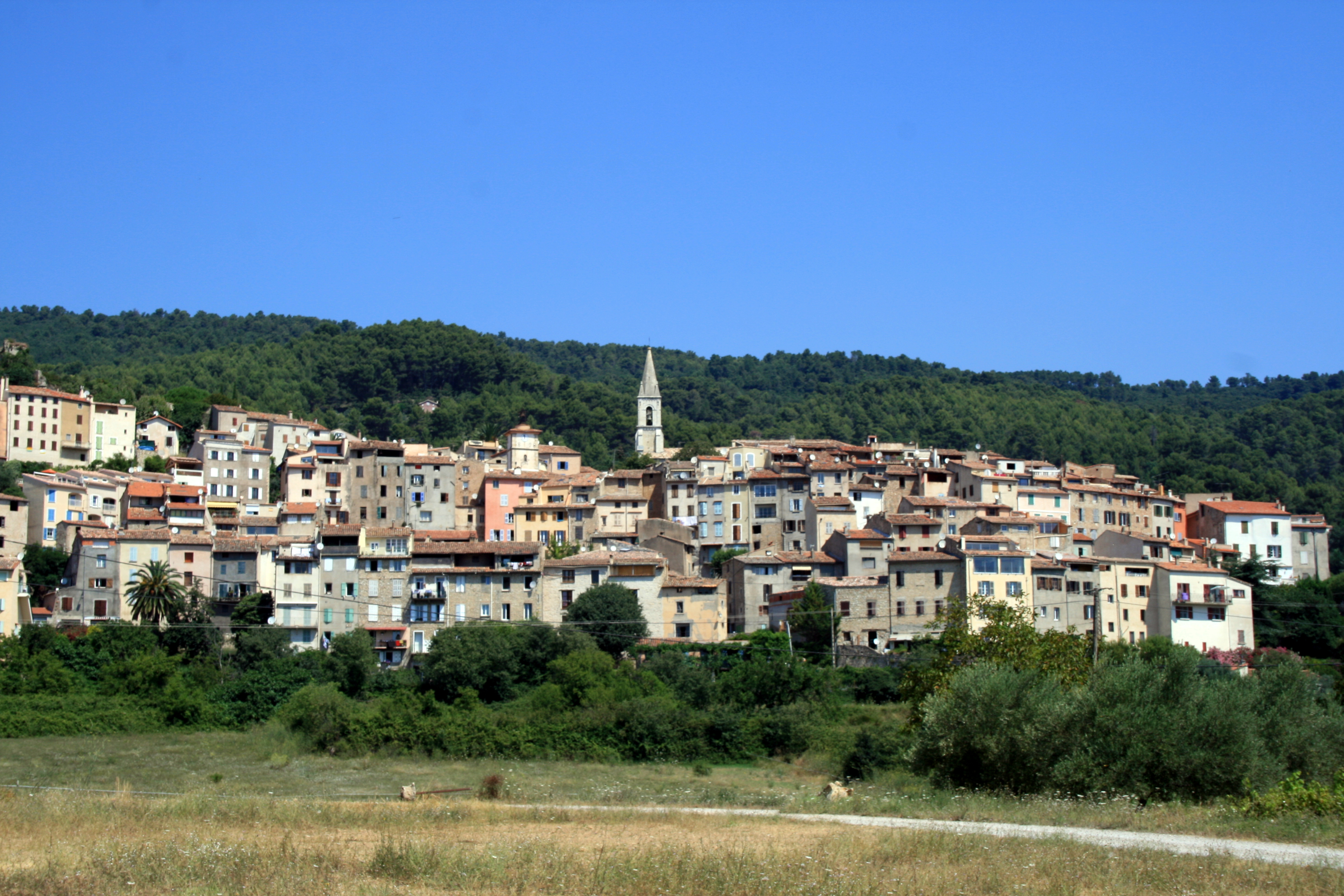
- A general view of the village

- Coat of arms
- Location of Callas
- Location within France Location within Provence-Alpes-Côte d'Azur
- Coordinates: 43°35′35″N 6°32′18″E
- Country: France
- Region: Provence-Alpes-Côte d'Azur
- Department: Var
- Arrondissement: Draguignan
- Canton: Flayosc
- Intercommunality: CA Dracénie Provence Verdon

Government
  - Mayor (2020–2026): Daniel Maria
- Area^{1}: 49.26 km^{2} (19.02 sq mi)
- Highest elevation: 811 m (2,661 ft)
- Lowest elevation: 60 m (200 ft)
- Population (2023): 2,124
  - Density: 43.12/km^{2} (111.7/sq mi)
- Time zone: UTC+01:00 (CET)
  - Summer (DST): UTC+02:00 (CEST)
- INSEE/Postal code: 83028 /83830
- ^{1} French Land Register data, which excludes lakes, ponds, glaciers > 1 km^{2} (0.386 sq mi or 247 acres) and river estuaries.

Callas (French pronunciation: [kalas]; Occitan: Calàs) is a commune in the Var department in the Provence-Alpes-Côte d'Azur region in southeastern France.

The commune is located on a hill top close to several vineyards. It's a 45-minute drive from coastal resort towns such as Fréjus and Saint-Raphaël and 75 minutes by car from Nice.

== Population ==
Historical population
Year	Pop.	±% p.a.
1968	608	—
1975	708	+2.20%
1982	945	+4.21%
1990	1,276	+3.83%
1999	1,388	+0.94%
2007	1,759	+3.01%
2012	1,829	+0.78%
2017	1,909	+0.86%
2023	2,124	+1.79%
Source: INSEE

== See also ==
- Communes of the Var department
