= La Motte, Var =

La Motte
- Commune
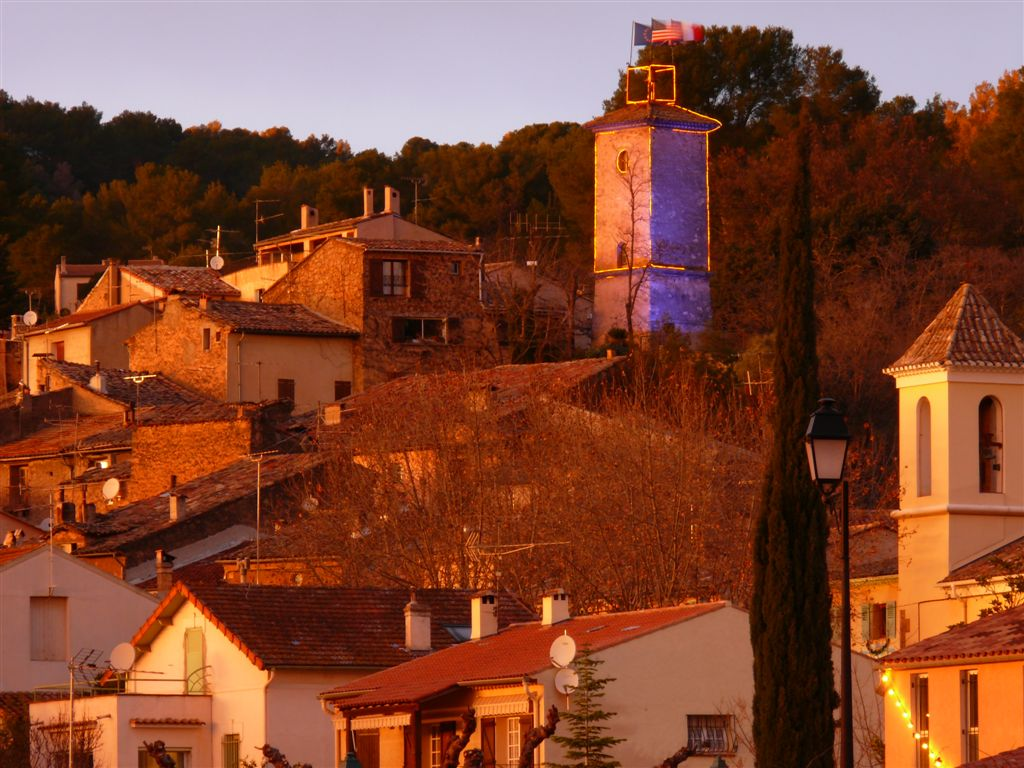
- A general view of the village

- Coat of arms
- Location of La Motte
- Location within France Location within Provence-Alpes-Côte d'Azur
- Coordinates: 43°29′41″N 6°32′09″E
- Country: France
- Region: Provence-Alpes-Côte d'Azur
- Department: Var
- Arrondissement: Draguignan
- Canton: Flayosc
- Intercommunality: CA Dracénie Provence Verdon

Government
  - Mayor (2020–2026): Valérie Marcy
- Area^{1}: 28.12 km^{2} (10.86 sq mi)
- Elevation: 60 m (200 ft)
- Highest elevation: 320 m (1,050 ft)
- Lowest elevation: 10 m (33 ft)
- Population (2023): 3,071
  - Density: 109.2/km^{2} (282.9/sq mi)
- Time zone: UTC+01:00 (CET)
  - Summer (DST): UTC+02:00 (CEST)
- INSEE/Postal code: 83085 /83920
- ^{1} French Land Register data, which excludes lakes, ponds, glaciers > 1 km^{2} (0.386 sq mi or 247 acres) and river estuaries.

La Motte (French pronunciation: [la mɔt]; Occitan: La Mota) is a commune in the Var department in the Provence-Alpes-Côte d'Azur region in southeastern France.

== Population ==
Historical population
Year	Pop.	±% p.a.
1968	818	—
1975	1,007	+3.01%
1982	1,557	+6.42%
1990	1,993	+3.13%
1999	2,345	+1.82%
2007	2,850	+2.47%
2012	3,000	+1.03%
2017	2,845	−1.06%
2023	3,071	+1.28%
Source: INSEE

== See also ==
- Communes of the Var department
