= Figanières =

Figanières Figanieras (Occitan)
- Commune
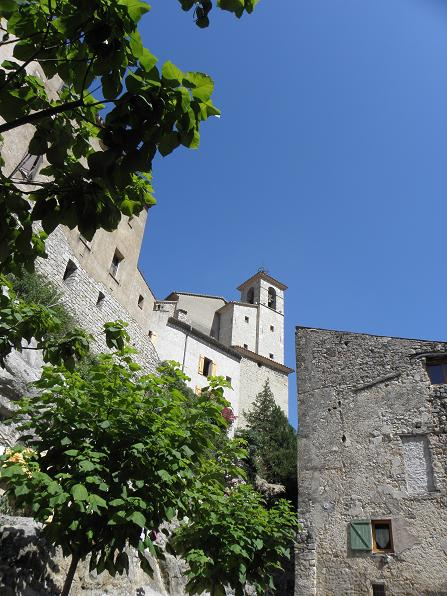
- Hilltop village and church of Figanières

- Coat of arms
- Location of Figanières
- Location within France Location within Provence-Alpes-Côte d'Azur
- Coordinates: 43°34′11″N 6°29′52″E
- Country: France
- Region: Provence-Alpes-Côte d'Azur
- Department: Var
- Arrondissement: Draguignan
- Canton: Flayosc
- Intercommunality: CA Dracénie Provence Verdon

Government
  - Mayor (2020–2026): Bernard Chilini
- Area^{1}: 28.17 km^{2} (10.88 sq mi)
- Elevation: 314 m (1,030 ft)
- Highest elevation: 719 m (2,359 ft)
- Lowest elevation: 227 m (745 ft)
- Population (2023): 2,762
  - Density: 98.05/km^{2} (253.9/sq mi)
- Time zone: UTC+01:00 (CET)
  - Summer (DST): UTC+02:00 (CEST)
- INSEE/Postal code: 83056 /83830
- ^{1} French Land Register data, which excludes lakes, ponds, glaciers > 1 km^{2} (0.386 sq mi or 247 acres) and river estuaries.

Figanières (French pronunciation: [fiɡanjɛʁ]; Occitan: Figanieras) is a commune in the Var department in the Provence-Alpes-Côte d'Azur region in Southeastern France. Figanières is located just northeast of Draguignan.

== Population ==
Historical population
Year	Pop.	±% p.a.
1968	571	—
1975	758	+4.13%
1982	1,176	+6.48%
1990	1,634	+4.20%
1999	2,230	+3.52%
2007	2,492	+1.40%
2012	2,576	+0.67%
2017	2,605	+0.22%
2023	2,762	+0.98%
Source: INSEE

== See also ==
- Communes of the Var department
