= Andrea Deodati =

Italian Roman Catholic prelate (1629–1713)

Most Reverend Andrea Deodati
- Archbishop of Rossano
- Church: Catholic Church
- Archdiocese: Archdiocese of Rossano
- In office: 1697–1713
- Predecessor: Andrea de Rossi (archbishop)
- Successor: Francesco Maria Muscettola

Orders
- Ordination: 2 June 1647
- Consecration: 7 July 1697 by Bandino Panciatici

Personal details
- Born: 12 October 1629 Castellane, Italy
- Died: 7 August 1713 (age 83) Rossano, Italy

Andrea Deodati, O.S.B (1629–1713) was a Roman Catholic prelate who served as Archbishop of Rossano (1697–1713).

== Biography ==
Andrea Deodati was born in Castellane, Italy on 12 October 1629 and ordained a priest in the Order of Saint Benedict on 2 June 1647. On 1 July 1697, he was appointed during the papacy of Pope Innocent XII as Archbishop of Rossano. On 7 July 1697, he was consecrated bishop by Bandino Panciatici, Cardinal-Priest of San Pancrazio, with Prospero Bottini, Titular Archbishop of Myra, and Marcello d'Aste, Titular Archbishop of Athenae, serving as co-consecrators. He served as Archbishop of Rossano until his death on 7 August 1713.

== External links and additional sources ==
- Cheney, David M. "Archdiocese of Rossano-Cariati". Catholic-Hierarchy.org. (for Chronology of Bishops)
- Chow, Gabriel. "Archdiocese of Rossano-Cariati (Italy)". GCatholic.org. (for Chronology of Bishops)

Catholic Church titles
Preceded by Andrea de Rossi (archbishop)	Archbishop of Rossano; 1697–1713	Succeeded by Francesco Maria Muscettola
