= Andrea de Rossi (bishop) =

Italian Roman Catholic prelate (1644–1696)

Most Reverend Andrea de Rossi
- Archbishop of Rossano
- Church: Catholic Church
- Diocese: Archdiocese of Rossano
- In office: 1688–1696
- Predecessor: Girolamo Compagnone
- Successor: Andrea Deodati

Orders
- Consecration: 8 June 1688 by Galeazzo Marescotti

Personal details
- Born: 15 July 1644 Serre, Campania
- Died: 30 October 1696 (aged 52) Rossano, Italy

Andrea de Rossi, C.R. (15 July 1644 – 30 October 1696) was a Roman Catholic prelate who served as Archbishop of Rossano (1688–1696).

== Biography ==
Andrea de Rossi was born in Serre, Campania and ordained a priest in the Congregation of Clerics Regular of the Divine Providence. On 31 May 1688, he was appointed during the papacy of Pope Innocent XI as Archbishop of Rossano. On 8 June 1688, he was consecrated bishop by Galeazzo Marescotti, Cardinal-Priest of Santi Quirico e Giulitta, with Pietro de Torres, Archbishop of Dubrovnik, and Pier Antonio Capobianco, Bishop Emeritus of Lacedonia, serving as co-consecrators. He served as Archbishop of Rossano until his death on 30 October 1696.

== External links and additional sources ==
- Cheney, David M. "Archdiocese of Rossano-Cariati". Catholic-Hierarchy.org. (for Chronology of Bishops)
- Chow, Gabriel. "Archdiocese of Rossano-Cariati (Italy)". GCatholic.org. (for Chronology of Bishops)

Catholic Church titles
Preceded by Girolamo Compagnone	Archbishop of Rossano; 1688–1696	Succeeded by Andrea Deodati
