= Castellane =

Castellane Castelana (Provençal)
- Subprefecture and commune
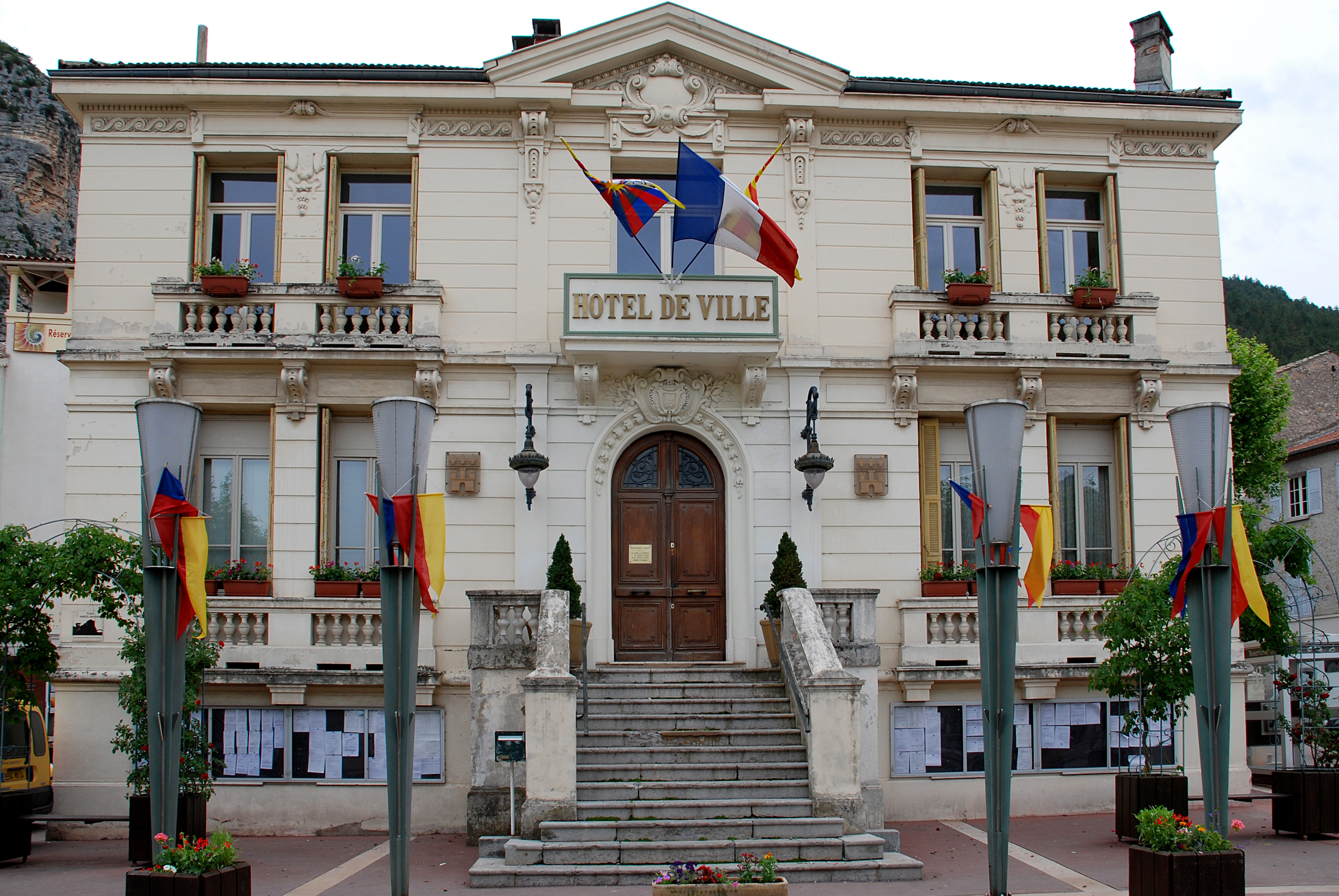
- Castellane Town Hall

- Coat of arms
- Location of Castellane
- Location within France Location within Provence-Alpes-Côte d'Azur
- Coordinates: 43°50′51″N 6°30′50″E
- Country: France
- Region: Provence-Alpes-Côte d'Azur
- Department: Alpes-de-Haute-Provence
- Arrondissement: Castellane
- Canton: Castellane
- Intercommunality: Alpes Provence Verdon – Sources de Lumière

Government
  - Mayor (2026–32): Bernard Liperini
- Area^{1}: 117.79 km^{2} (45.48 sq mi)
- Elevation: 724 m (2,375 ft)
- Highest elevation: 1,761 m (5,778 ft)
- Lowest elevation: 639 m (2,096 ft)
- Population (2023): 1,472
  - Density: 12.50/km^{2} (32.37/sq mi)
- Time zone: UTC+01:00 (CET)
  - Summer (DST): UTC+02:00 (CEST)
- INSEE/Postal code: 04039 /04120
- ^{1} French Land Register data, which excludes lakes, ponds, glaciers > 1 km^{2} (0.386 sq mi or 247 acres) and river estuaries.

Castellane (French pronunciation: [kastɛlan]; Provençal Occitan: Castelana) is a commune in the Alpes-de-Haute-Provence department in the Provence-Alpes-Côte d'Azur region in Southeastern France. With a population of 1,472 (2023), it is France's second-least populated subprefecture, after Largentière in Ardèche.

Its inhabitants are referred to as Castellanais (masculine) and Castellanaises (feminine).

== Geography ==
Castellane is a very old city located upstream of the Gorges du Verdon. The city is 724 metres (2,375 feet) above sea level.

The Roc, or the Roc of Notre-Dame, overlooks the city from 184 m (604 ft) above. It has been occupied since the High Middle Ages and is a registered historical site. It can be accessed from the centre of town behind the old Church of St. Andrew. The walk takes about 25 minutes.

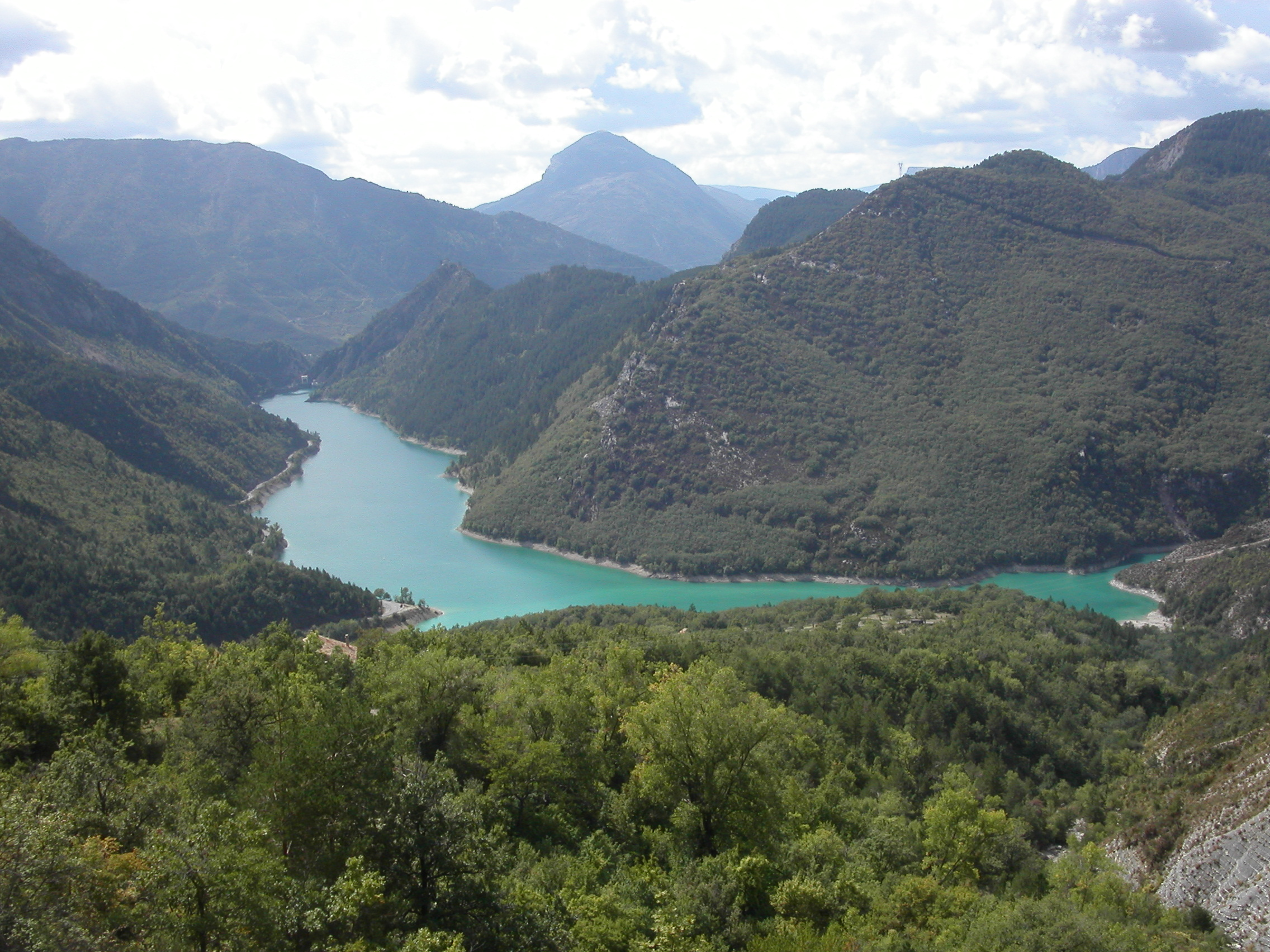
Lac de Chaudanne

Two reservoirs are located in the territory of Castellane:

- Lake Castillon
- Lake Chaudanne, created by the dam of the same name, the Barrage de Chaudanne.

The area has two water gaps:

- the clue de Taulanne containing the Asse de Blieux river and the Route Napoléon along its banks.
- the clue de Chasteuil, which contains the Verdon valley.

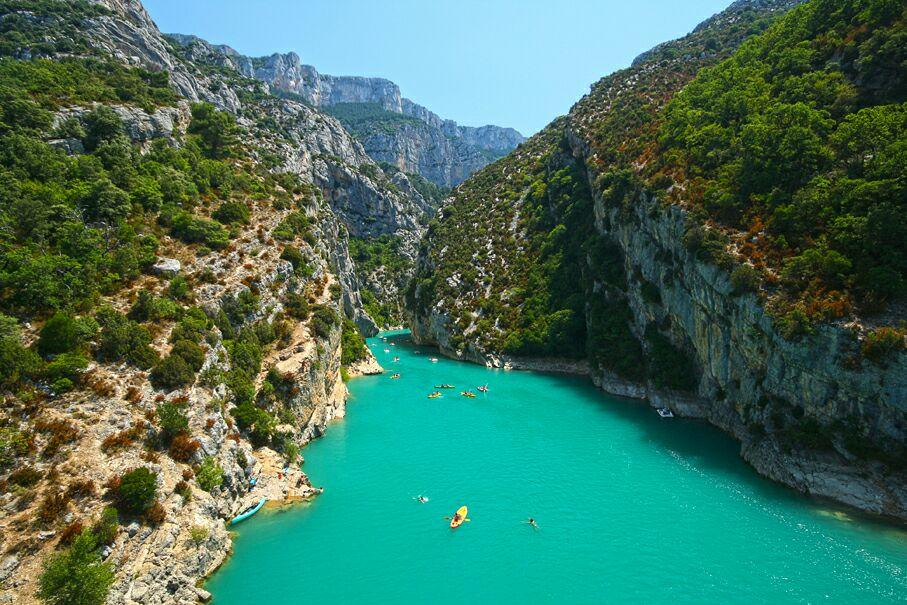
Gorge of Castellane

The GR 4 hiking trail crosses through the town. The neighboring municipalities are:

- Saint-André-les-Alpes
- Saint-Julien-du-Verdon
- Demandolx
- La Garde
- Châteauvieux
- Brenon
- Le Bourguet
- Trigance
- Rougon
- Blieux
- Senez

=== Climate ===
Castellane features a warm-summer mediterranean climate (Köppen: Csb), bordering on a mediterraneran continental climate (Köppen: Dsb). Summers are warm to hot and dry, while winters are cold and snowy.

Climate data for Digne-les-Bains, Alpes-de-Haute-Provence, France
Month	Jan	Feb	Mar	Apr	May	Jun	Jul	Aug	Sep	Oct	Nov	Dec	Year
Record high °C (°F)	22.8 (73.0)	23.7 (74.7)	25.8 (78.4)	27.6 (81.7)	31.8 (89.2)	35.6 (96.1)	37.3 (99.1)	37 (99)	33.4 (92.1)	29.7 (85.5)	23.3 (73.9)	20.3 (68.5)	37.3 (99.1)
Mean daily maximum °C (°F)	8.8 (47.8)	10.7 (51.3)	14 (57)	15.9 (60.6)	20.4 (68.7)	24.8 (76.6)	28.4 (83.1)	27.8 (82.0)	23.4 (74.1)	18.5 (65.3)	12.8 (55.0)	8.6 (47.5)	17.9 (64.2)
Daily mean °C (°F)	1.5 (34.7)	2.8 (37.0)	5.9 (42.6)	8.3 (46.9)	12.6 (54.7)	16.5 (61.7)	19.4 (66.9)	18.9 (66.0)	15 (59)	10.9 (51.6)	5.9 (42.6)	2 (36)	10 (50)
Mean daily minimum °C (°F)	−5.7 (21.7)	−5.1 (22.8)	−2.1 (28.2)	0.7 (33.3)	4.8 (40.6)	8.1 (46.6)	10.3 (50.5)	9.9 (49.8)	6.6 (43.9)	3.4 (38.1)	−1.1 (30.0)	−4.5 (23.9)	2.1 (35.8)
Record low °C (°F)	−20.5 (−4.9)	−18.8 (−1.8)	−19.0 (−2.2)	−9 (16)	−4 (25)	−0.8 (30.6)	2.5 (36.5)	1 (34)	−2.2 (28.0)	−9 (16)	−15.5 (4.1)	−19.5 (−3.1)	−20.5 (−4.9)
Average precipitation mm (inches)	67.1 (2.64)	50.4 (1.98)	51.5 (2.03)	82.1 (3.23)	92.2 (3.63)	75.5 (2.97)	42.4 (1.67)	66.9 (2.63)	91.9 (3.62)	117.9 (4.64)	109 (4.3)	89 (3.5)	935.9 (36.85)
Average precipitation days (≥ 1.0 mm)	6.1	5.5	6.1	9.3	9.1	7.1	4.5	5.1	6.6	8.3	7.5	7.6	82.7

=== Geology ===
The commune is part of the Jurassic limestone area of the French Prealps in Provence, formed by the tectonic upheaval of the Alps during the Tertiary. Limestone deposits run the length of the Verdon river, giving rise to spectacular gorges formed through karst erosion. Around Castellane older formations surface, such as gypsum and Triassic black marl.

Neighboring mountains and passes

- Castellard (1,725 m or 5,659 ft)
- Pré Chauvin (1,741 m or 5,712 ft)
- Lèques Pass, the route taken by Napoleon
- Blaches Pass, on the road to Saint-André-les-Alpes

=== Environment ===
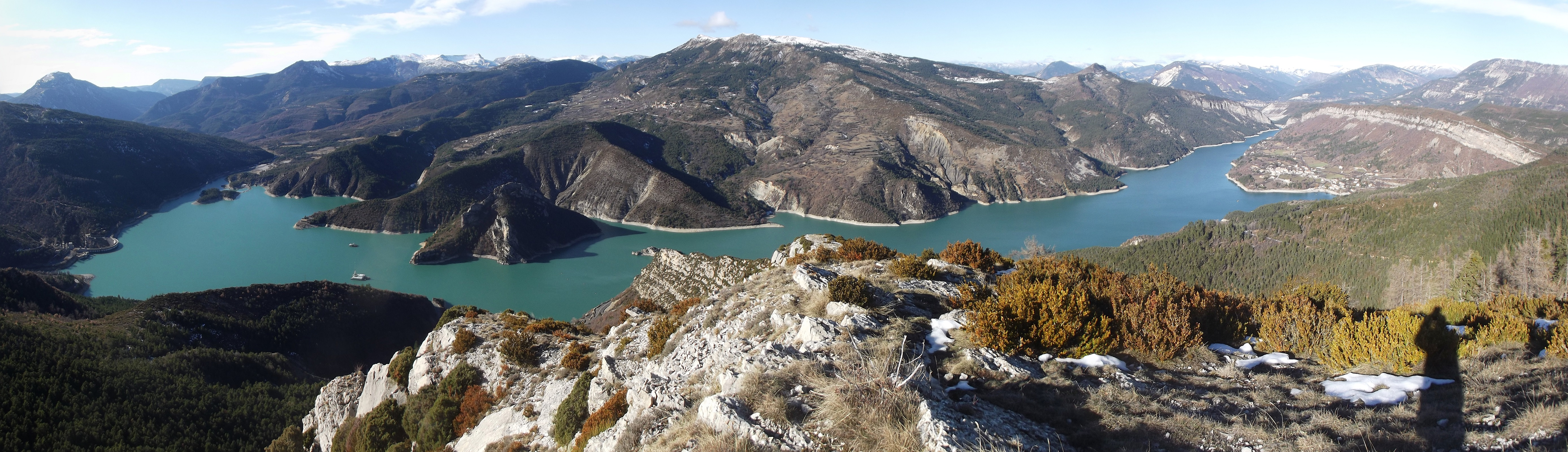
Lac de Castillon

The commune contains 7,000 acres (2,800 hectares) of wood and forests (about 59% of its surface area). The Massif du Montdenier extends over the western part of the commune (former communes of Taulanne, Chasteuil and Villars-Brandis).

=== History of place names ===
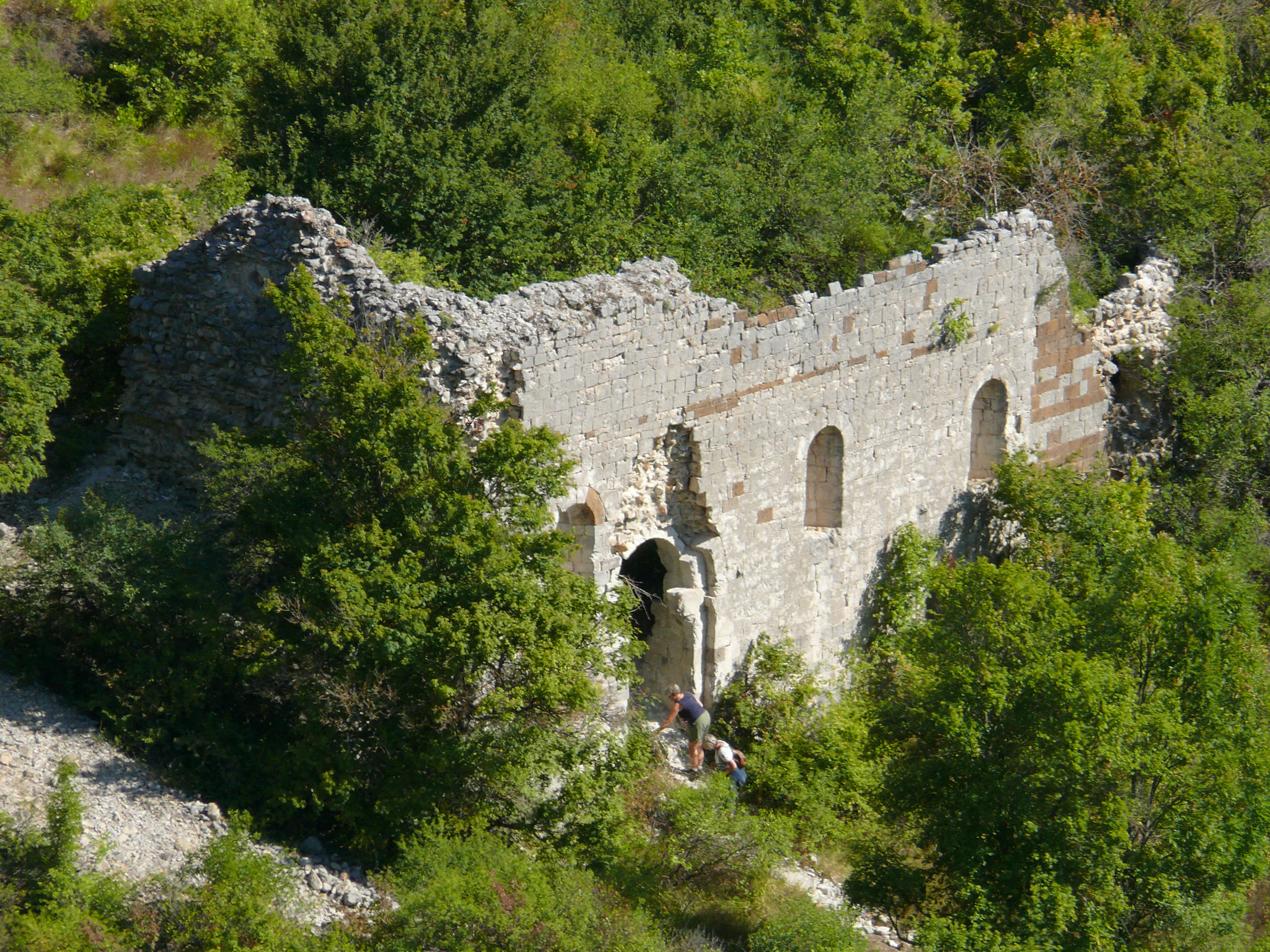
Petra Castellana

Castellane's name appeared in texts for the first time circa 965–977 as Petra Castellana. The name breaks down into three Occitan terms, pèira, castel and the suffix -ana, which means fortified rock and village, and could be translated as "Castellane rock", in other words, the rock that has a fortified village, or simply the stronghouse or stronghold. Castellane is called Castelana in the Provençal dialect in the classical norm, or Castelano in the Mistralian.

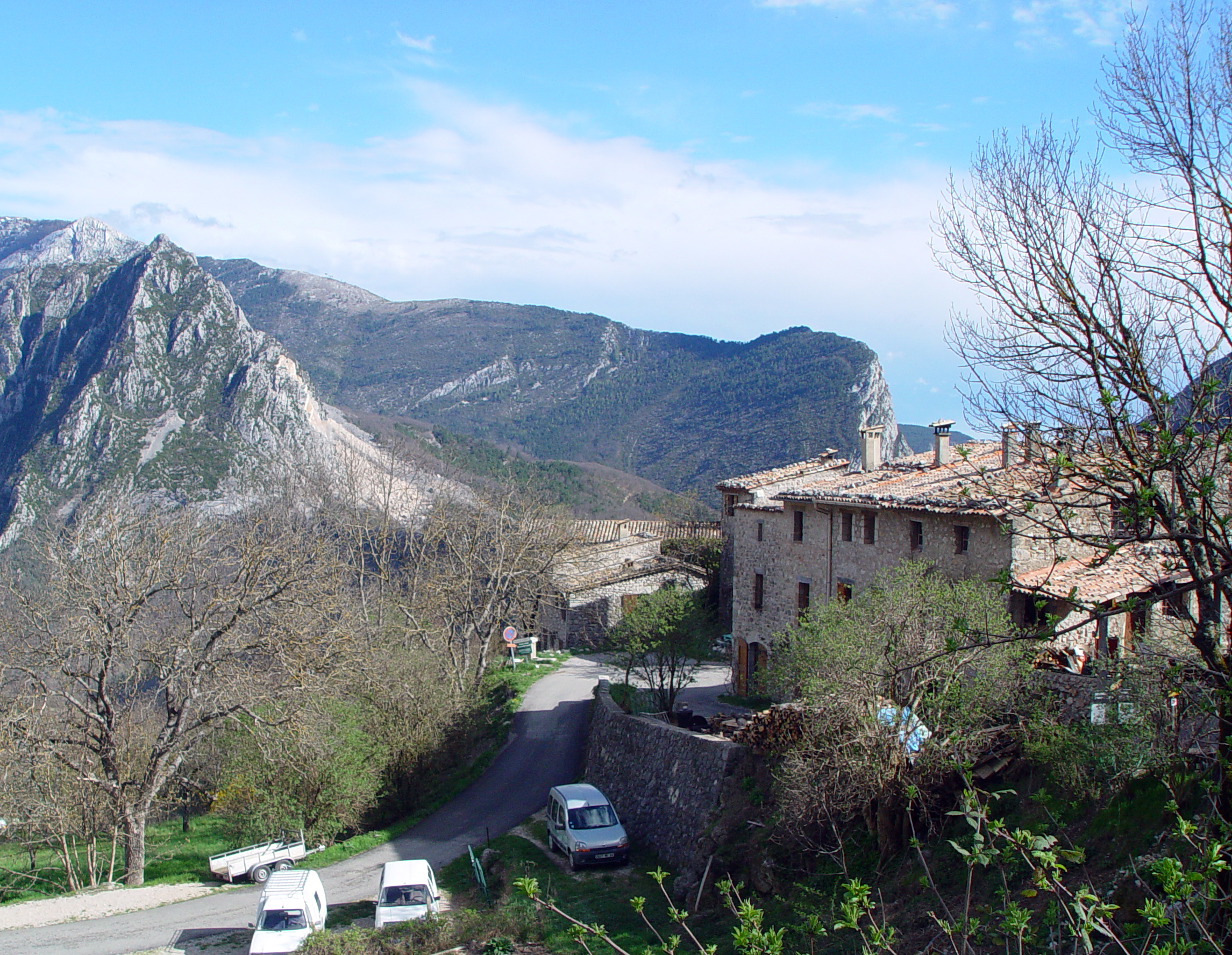
Village of Chasteuil

The former commune of Castillon, now beneath the lake, appeared around 1300 as de Castilhone, an Occitan word for a small castle.

The first part of the name "Chasteuil" is obscure, but the second, -ialo, is a Celtic suffix for "clearing".

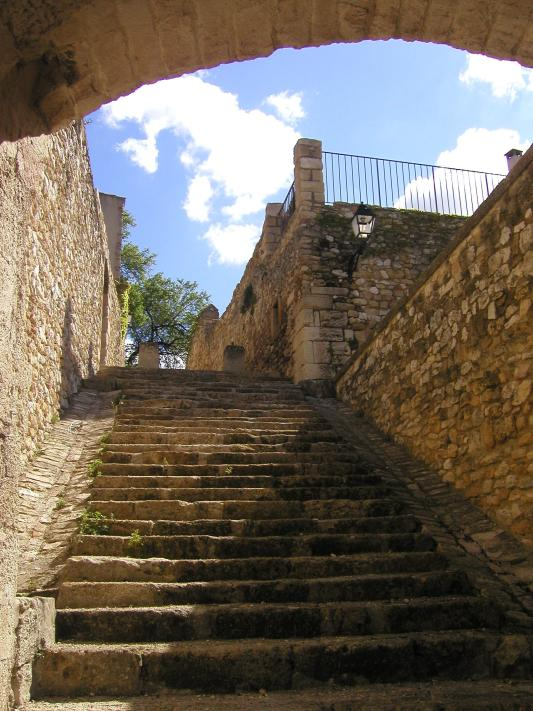
Robion

The village of Robion has the same name as the river that and flows through it into the Jabron River and takes its source from the Massif du Robion to the east of the village. The name in Rubione, which first appeared for it in 1045, is derived from the vulgar Latin robigonem, a distortion of the classical Latin robiginem for rust, according to Ernest Nègre. Charles Rostaing, on the other hand, believed that the name might predate the Gauls and designate a steep-sided ravine.

Taloire, was first mentioned in 1095 when the château of Taloire was given to the Abbey of St. Victor, Marseille, which became the lay seigneur of the fief. It derived its name from the Occitan talador, meaning soldiers especially recruited to devastate the land of an adversary. Adding the -ia suffix designates, either a land inhabited by these devastators, or a land devastated by the taladors. Rostaing thought this name also probably also predated the Gauls. Bénédicte and Jean-Jacques Fénié noted a tautology: *Tal- et *Tor-, the teo roots. The name "Taloire" contains two terms designating a mountain.

== Economy ==
In 2017, the unemployment rate of the Castellane population was 20.1%, up from 12.4% in 2007. The largest sector of activity in December 2015 was the public sector (administration, education, health, social work) with 45 businesses and 280 paid workers.

== History ==
=== Prehistory and antiquity ===
The inhabitants of Castellane are known back to a very early date. Neolithic nomads came through the area; the oldest traces date back to 6000 BC. A grotto with cave paintings exists in the commune but its location is kept confidential to protect the artwork; Bronze Age tombs have also been discovered in a cave in Castillon. Ligurian tribes occupied the territory. The Suetrii or Suètres later created an oppidum (Note: from the Latin "oppidum" (fortified camp on a hill).) named Ducelia, near the Roc. They mined salt in the area and sold it. Most of the communes attached to Castellane today were peopled by the Suetrii. Taulanne was the exception, inhabited by the people who had their capital in Senez. (Their name is uncertain and Roman historians differ on the subject.)

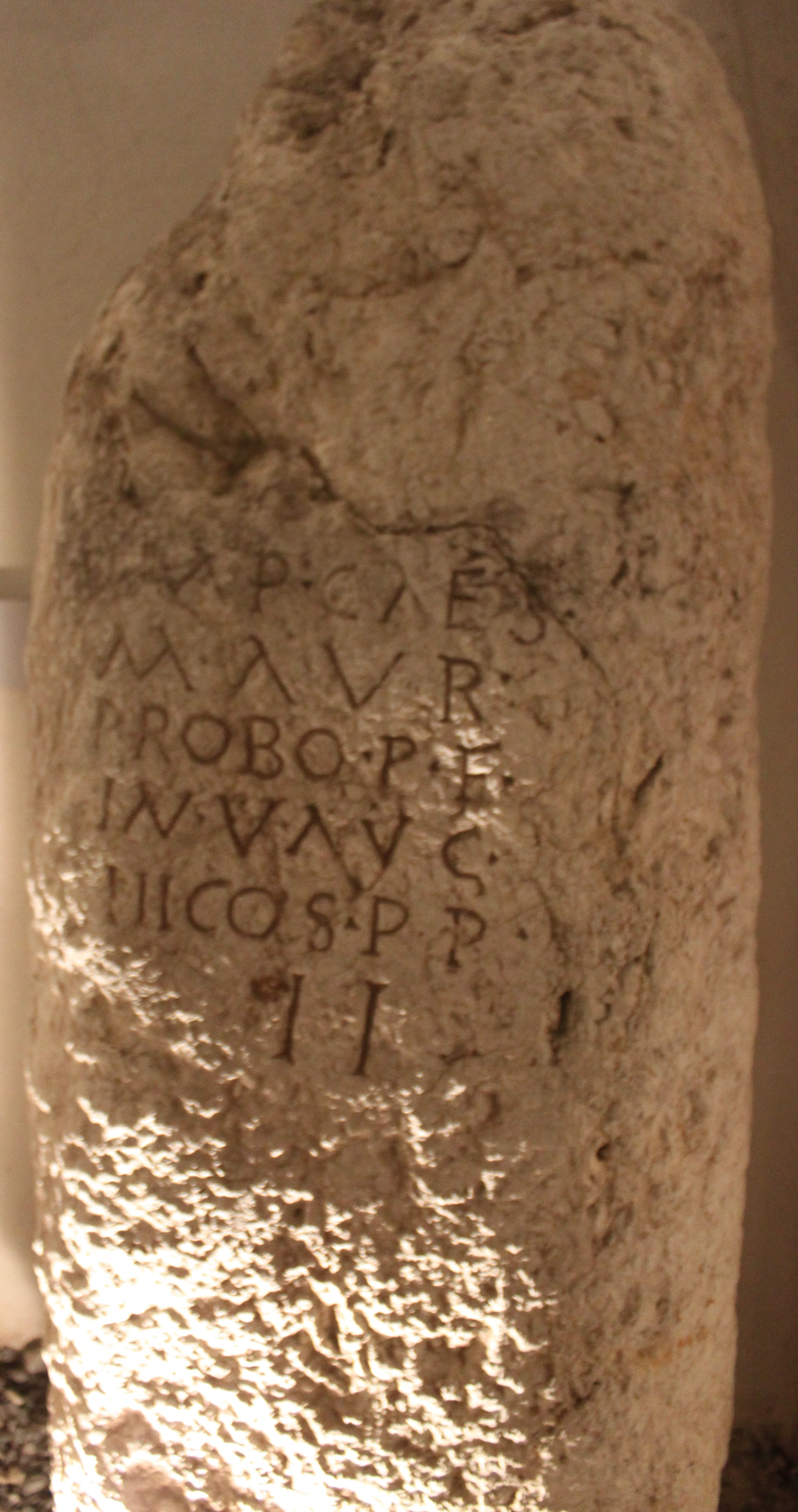
Roman milestone

The region was conquered by Augustus in 14 BC. Castellane was attached to the Roman province of Alpes-Maritimes and began to grow. Homes were established in the plain, and the city was named Civitas Saliniensum (city of salt merchants). The name of the town later became Salinae.

Several roads left from or passed through the town:

- Via Salinaria, going west towards Durance and the current Château-Arnoux
- Via Ventiana, from Cimiez to Sisteron by way of Vence; a carved milestone from the beginning of the third century was found on this road in the Saint-Pierre pass six miles from Castellane
- a fork towards Via Aurelia and Via Domitia
- a road towards Entrevaux (Glandèves) by way of Briançonnet

Residents first settled on the bank of the Verdon to mine the saline sources which are still visible today. A treasure of antiquity, 34 gold coins issued by Arcadius and Honorius, were discovered in 1797 in Taloire. A limestone funerary stele for one Julius Trofimus, dating back to Roman times, was discovered near the old chapel of Notre-Dame-du-Plan. Until 1942 it was used in a retaining wall, and can be found today in the public garden of the savings bank. The inscription is included in the Inscriptions latines de Gaule narbonnaise (ILGN) collection of Gallia Narbonensis Roman inscriptions and is listed on the historic register.

A diocese was founded in the fifth century: its seat was transferred to Senez before the 6th century however and despite all attempts to have it return to Castellan it remained there until it was closed in the French Revolution.

=== Middle Ages ===
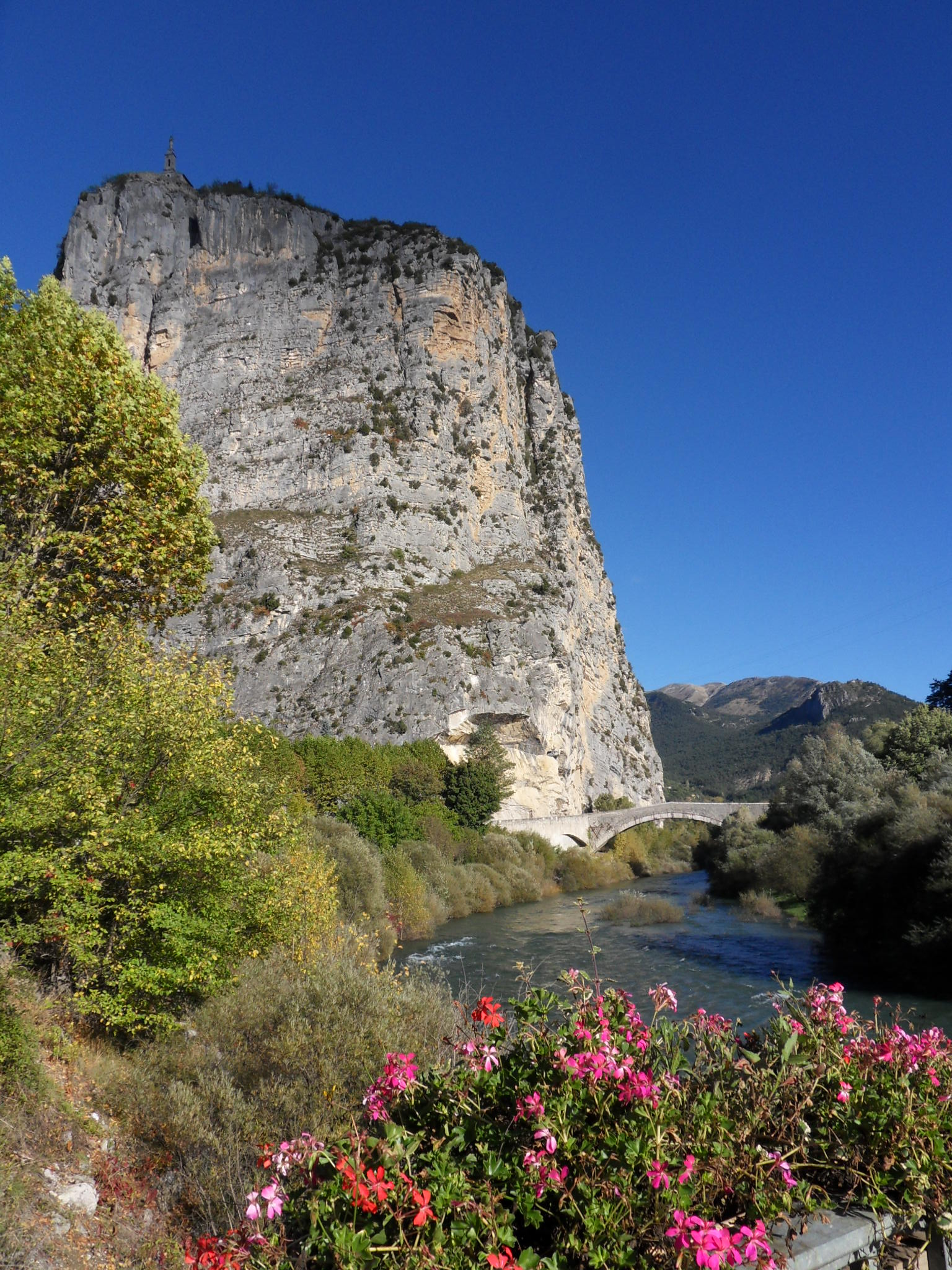

In the early ninth century, the area around the current town of Castellane was inhabited by only 84 people. In 812 the area was invaded by Moors, also sometimes called Saracens; they destroyed Salines, the early settlement near the salt marshes. The inhabitants of Salines took refuge on the summit of the Roc and built a stronghold there, building the first Notre-Dame there, inaugurated in 852, in thanks for the refuge. Some vestiges of this site, which was named Sinaca in 813 and Petra Castellana in 965, are still visible at the place now known as Le Signal. People later also settled at the foot of the Roc in the valley bottom.

In 852 a lord of Castellane, possibly named Guillaume won a victory against the Moors and put together a barony of 46 village communities stretching from Cotignac in Var to the south, to Thorame-Haute in the north, and from Soleilhas to Esparron-de-Verdon. The Barony was considered a small sovereign state ruled by hereditary sovereign barons. Over time Castellane came to have three co-existing sites:

- the Rupes, on top of the Rock, was soon entirely occupied by the castle built in 977 by Pons-Arbaud and Aldebert
- the Castrum, halfway up, on a larger site but easy to defend;
- the Burgum, current site of Castellane, easily accessible, facilitating trade.

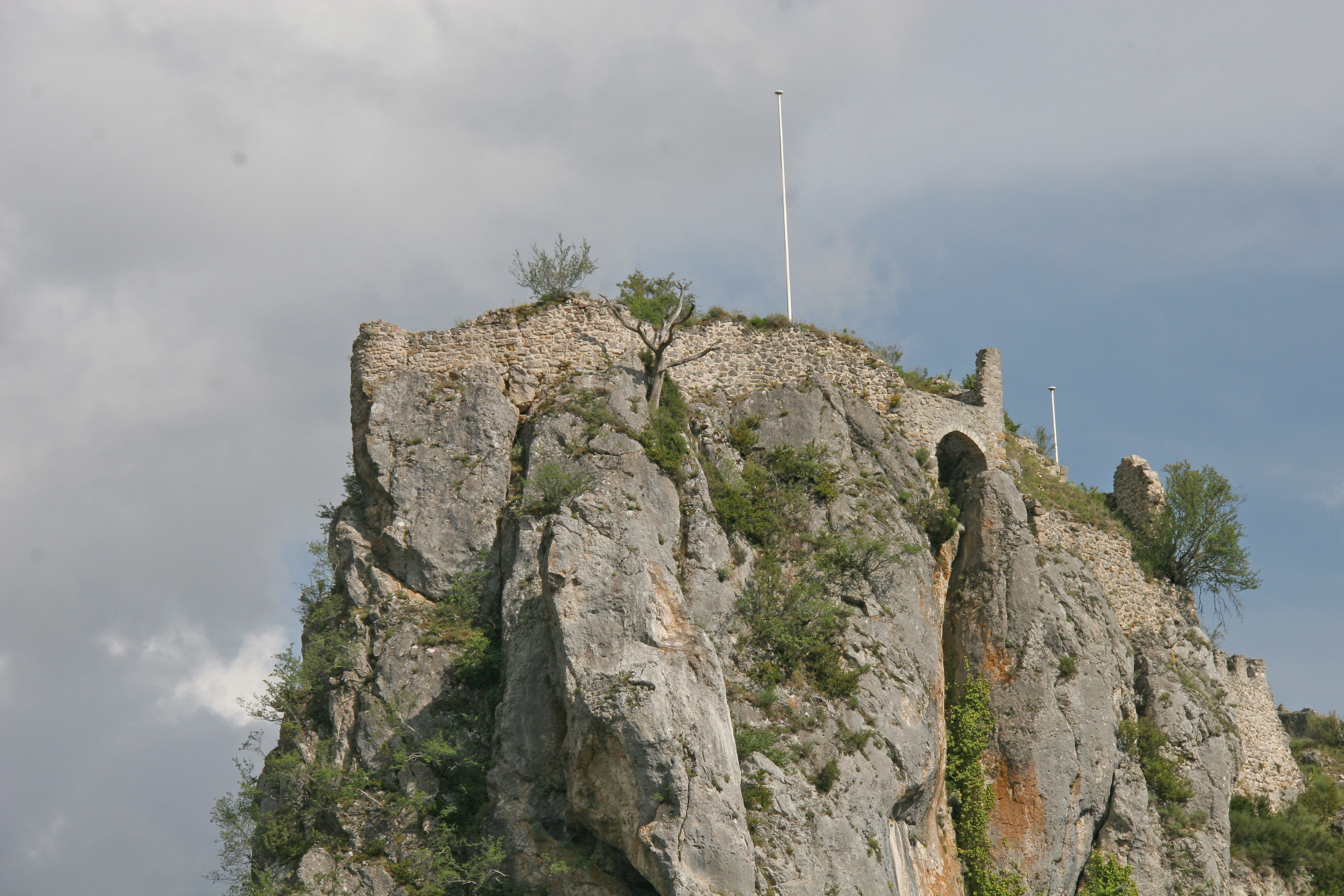
Ruined château in Rougon

In 1189, Baron de Castellane Boniface III was attacked by Alfonso I of Provence. He had refused to do homage, explaining that he was a vassal of the Holy Roman Empire. But in the face of brute force he was forced to bend the knee. Another war broke out in 1227 between the Provence and Boniface of Castellane, presumably the son. In 1257 Charles II—then still just prince of Salernes, gave the castle to the Austinian monks. In 1262, Charles I of Anjou defeated Boniface of Castellane and made Castelle the seat of a baile. In the thirteenth century, the family of Castellane lost possession of the city to the Counts of Provence. To protect themselves from attack, in addition to the protections for the city, Castellane built a series of fortified outposts at Demandolx, La Garde, Chasteuil, Rougon, and perhaps Taloire. In 1300 a small Jewish community of eight households was established in the area.

The Black Death reached Castellane in 1348, and was followed by a devastating flood of the Verdon River. The capture and death of Queen Joanna I of Naples created a succession issue in the county of Provence, the cities of the Union of Aix (1382–1387) supporting Charles de Duras against Louis I of Anjou.

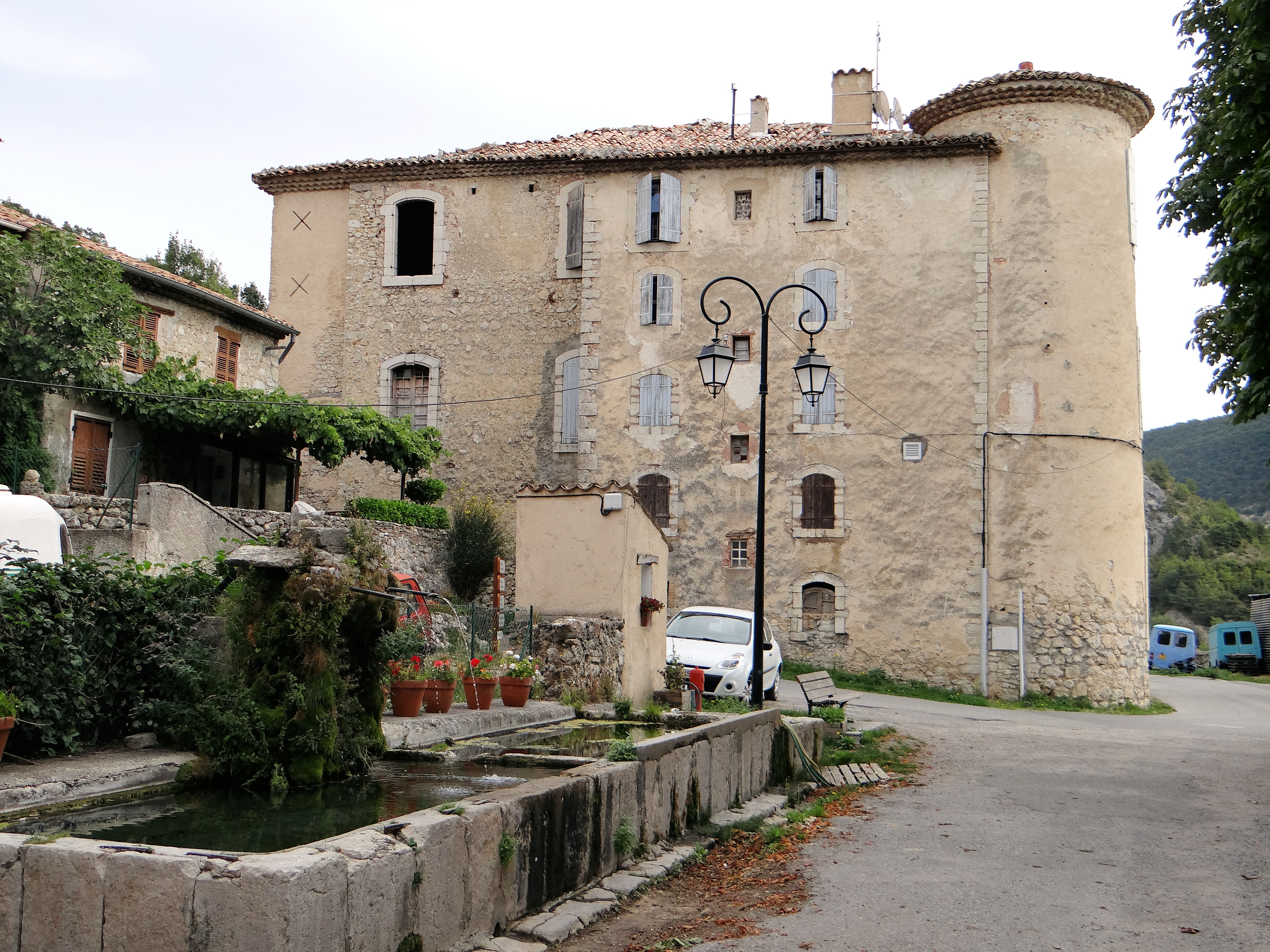
Château_d'Éoulx

Lord of Castellane Louis d'Anduse, also often known as Lord of La Voulte, sided with the Duke of Anjou from the spring of 1382, supporting him on condition he participate in an expedition to rescue the queen. Castellane itself initially also backed the Duke, but changed allegiance in February 1386 after the Duke died, and rallied to the cause of the queen-regent, Marie de Blois. She negotiated with them, hoping to set off a chain of similar declarations of support. Guillaume de Forcalquier and his son Jean Raynaut, lords of Eoulx, submitted to the Duchess in July 1386. In 1390, Raimond de Turenne ravaged the surrounding territory and the village of Taulanne and failed to take the city, but did destroy the wooden bridge over the Verdon River.

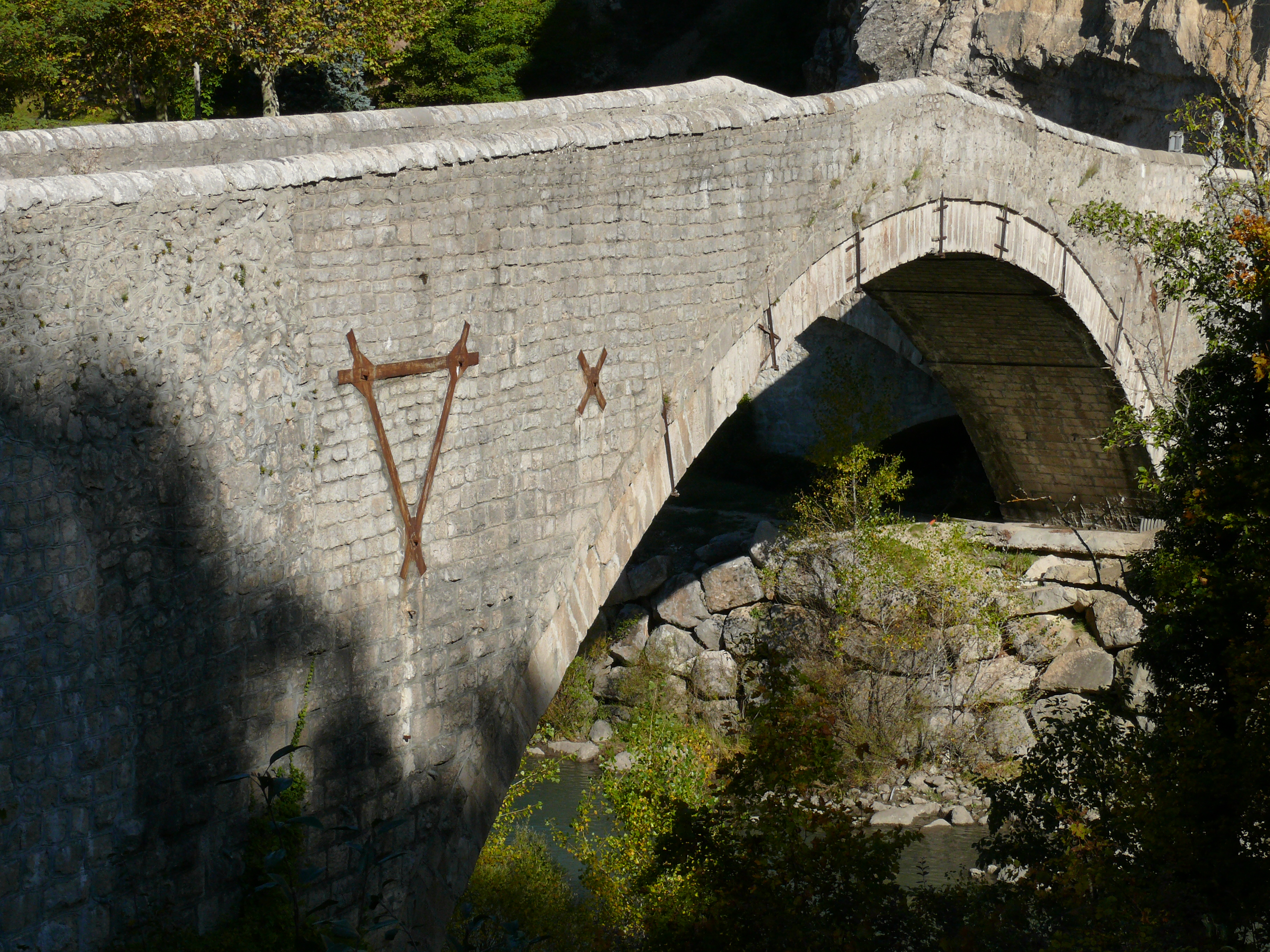
Pont du Roc

The wooden bridge over the Verdon was rebuilt in stone in the 15th century. A monastery took care of its maintenance. The bridge on the Place Castellane put Castellane on the frequently travelled routes between the Mediterranean and the bridge over the Durance river at Sisteron. The bridge toll for the Verdon and the fair began at the end of the Middle Ages. The fair continued until the end of the Ancien Régime, assuring the town relative prosperity.

In the fifteenth century, a community settled on the present site of Taloire. In the middle of the fifteenth century, the upper village was completely abandoned in favor of the lowland site.

=== Renaissance ===
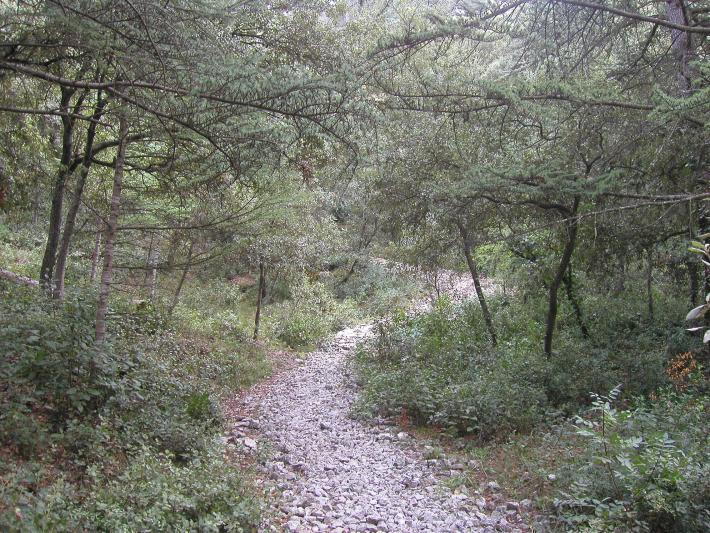
Draille in Robion

At the end of the Middle Ages, the transhumance system developed enormously, herds of sheep from the coast going up into the high Alpine valleys in the summer. Some drailles (herding routes) crossed the Castellane bridge, where a toll was instituted. At the beginning of the 16th century, between 78,000 and 120,000 head were crossing each year during May and June.

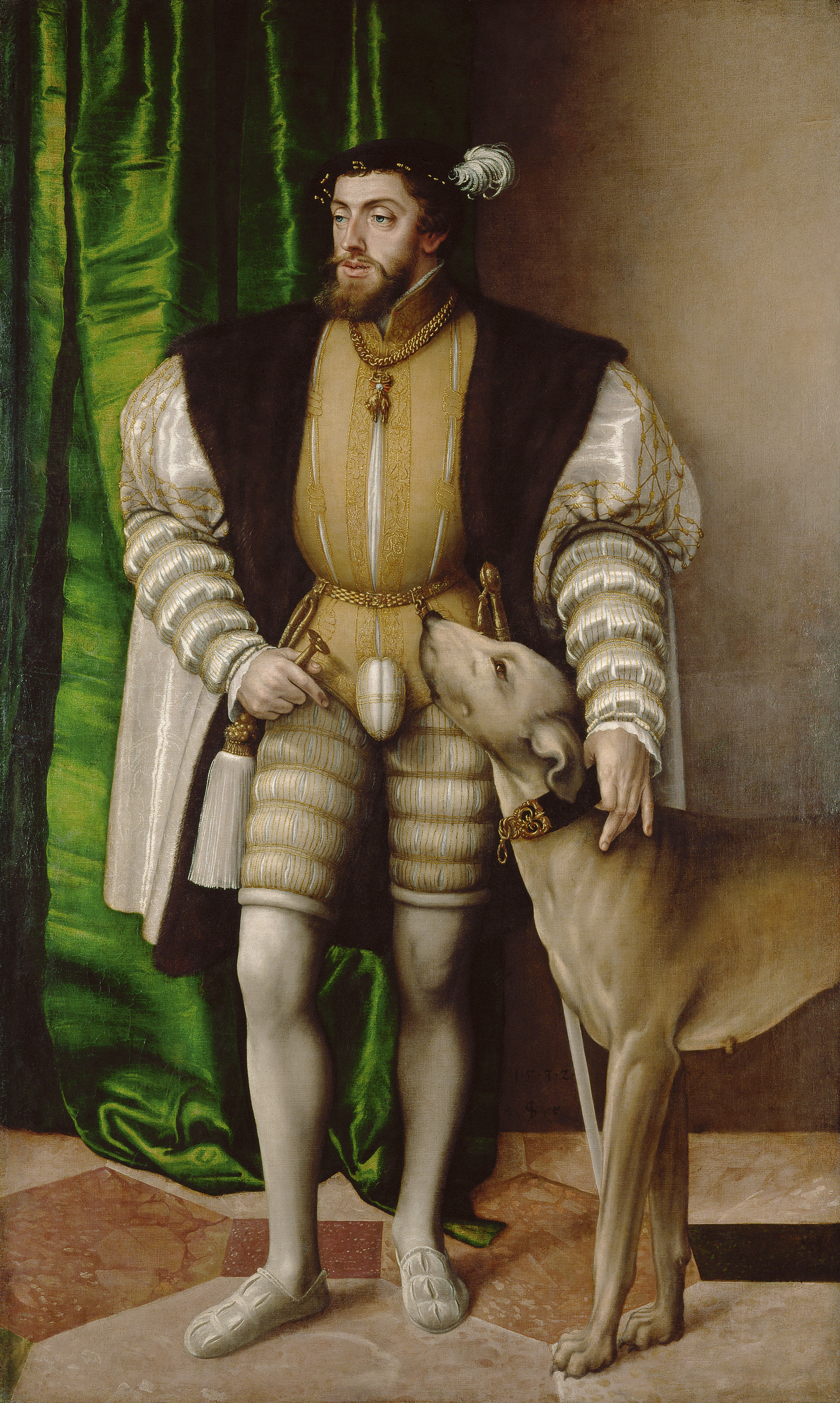
Charles V

The imperial army of Charles V pillaged the town en 1536.

Religious unrest broke out in 1559. Brun de Caille had converted some of the townspeople of Castellane, who gathered at his home for services. A sectarian skirmish took place at his home. Huguenot captain Paulon de Mauvans, of another rich Protestant family, sacked the town in the summer of 1560, then established himself there after reaching an armistice with the governor of Provence, the count of Tende, Claude of Savoy. The town was attacked by Protestants on 4 October 1574, but the residents of Castellane and its surroundings chased them off, pursuing them as far as the clue de Taulanne. On 30 January 1586, the Baron of Allemagne and the Duke of Lesdiguières tried to surprise the town. The sneak attack was repulsed and the Baron d'Allemagne was injured by a bullet in his back, which caused the assailants to retreat. The Baron was killed in September of that year trying to lift the siege of his own castle, shot in the head by an arquebus. The end of the siege of Castellane has since been celebrated every year in the last weekend of January with the Pétardiers ceremony reenacting the attack, and notably the episode of Judith André or Andrau, the goodwife of Barrême, who killed pétardier captain Jean Motte by pouring a kettle of boiling peas over him from the top of the porte de l'Annonciade, reputed to be the weak point in the defenses. s1z

=== 17th and 18th century ===
The plague struck the town again in 1630.

The Jansenist bishop Jean Soanen tried to make the celebrations of Saint-Sacrement, Saint-Jean and Saint-Éloi more sedate and less unbridled, the youth of the town having a tradition of celebrating with drums, music and gunshots. The youth refused, resisted, made even more noise and even revolted, preventing the procession of the octave du Saint-Sacrement from leaving the church on 22 June 1710. In 1726 the youth of Robion, whom the priest wanted to prevent from dancing on Sunday, also revolted.

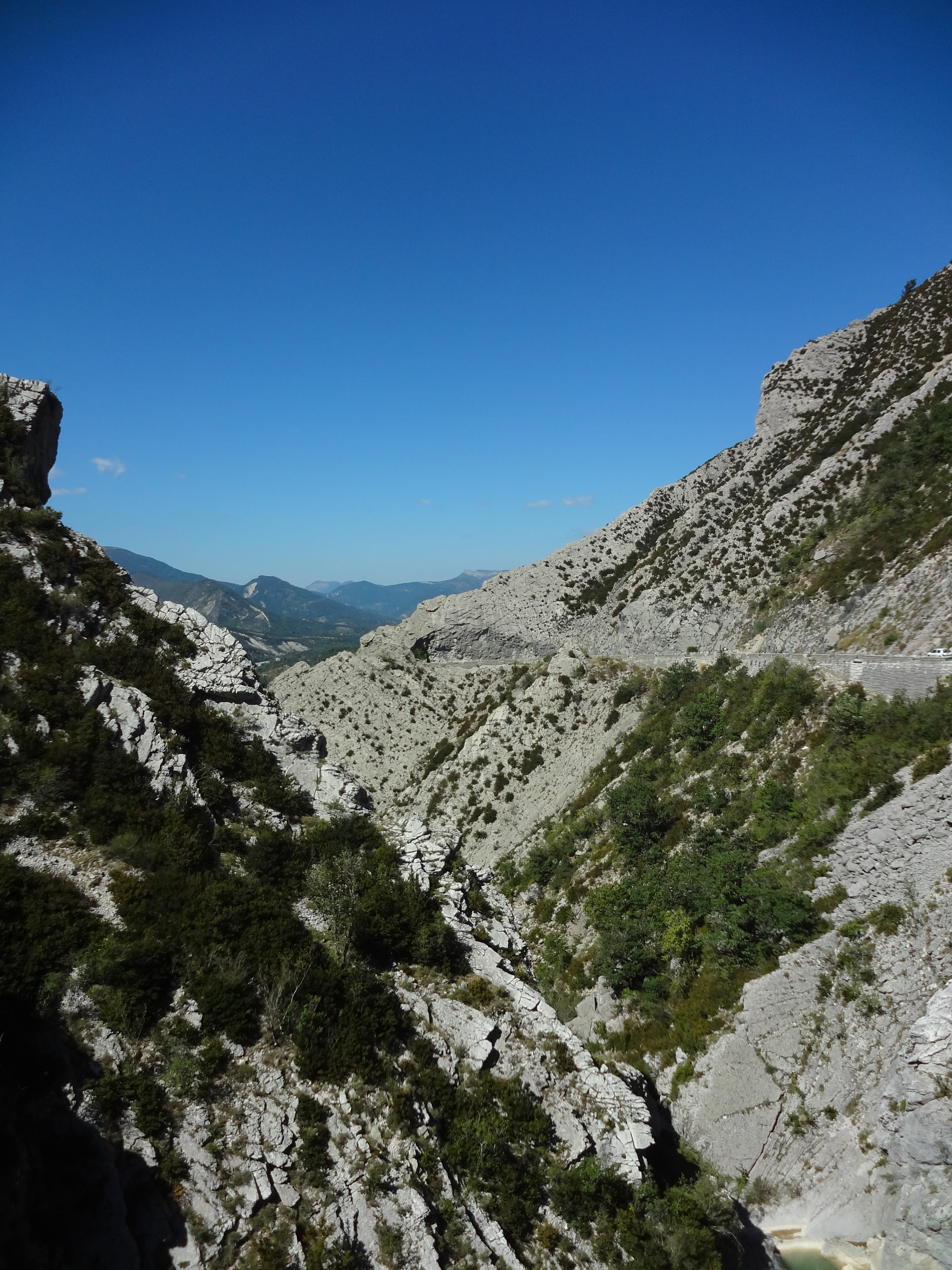
Clue de Taulanne

The Austrian-Sardinian army briefly occupied the town in 1746 during the war of the Austrian Succession. In December 1746, Provence was invaded by an Austrian-Sardinian army. A troop of 2,000 men took Castellane, then the surrounding villages, as far as the château of Trigance. After some difficulty, the Spanish and French armies coordinated a counteroffensive, which began at the start of January when French soldiers under the orders of the Count of Maulévrier took an Austrian outpost in Chasteuil. The Austrian commander, Maximilian Ulysses Browne, reinforced his right wing with four battalions garrisoned at Castellane, and six on the south bank of the Verdon. Seven other battalions formed a second available squadron. Nine battalions and ten squads of Spaniards were stationed in Riez and 2,500 Swiss paid by Spain were stationed at Senez. On 21 January Hispano-French troops went on the offensive, commanded by the Frenchman Maulévrier and the Spanish Marquis of Taubin. The Spanish left their quarters by night and advanced on Castellane through the clue de Taulanne, while the French passing through the Vodon gorge. The difficult marches necessary to approach in this way nonetheless allowed a coordinated attack around 7am.

The first outposts were taken without difficulty, which allowed Maulévrier to connect on his left with Taubin, and to send a column of dragoons onto the right bank to cut the Austrians' retreat. This assault took the Austrian-Sardinians fortifications without difficulty, the French-Spanish entered the town and did prevent the last Austrians from retreating. In all, they took 287 Austrians prisoner, including the baron de Neuhaus, the lieutenant-general in command. The Austrian-Sardinians also had a hundred-odd dead, versus twenty Franco-Spanish soldiers. The villages of La Garde, Eoulx, Robion, Taloire, Trigance and Comps were evacuated on 22 January.

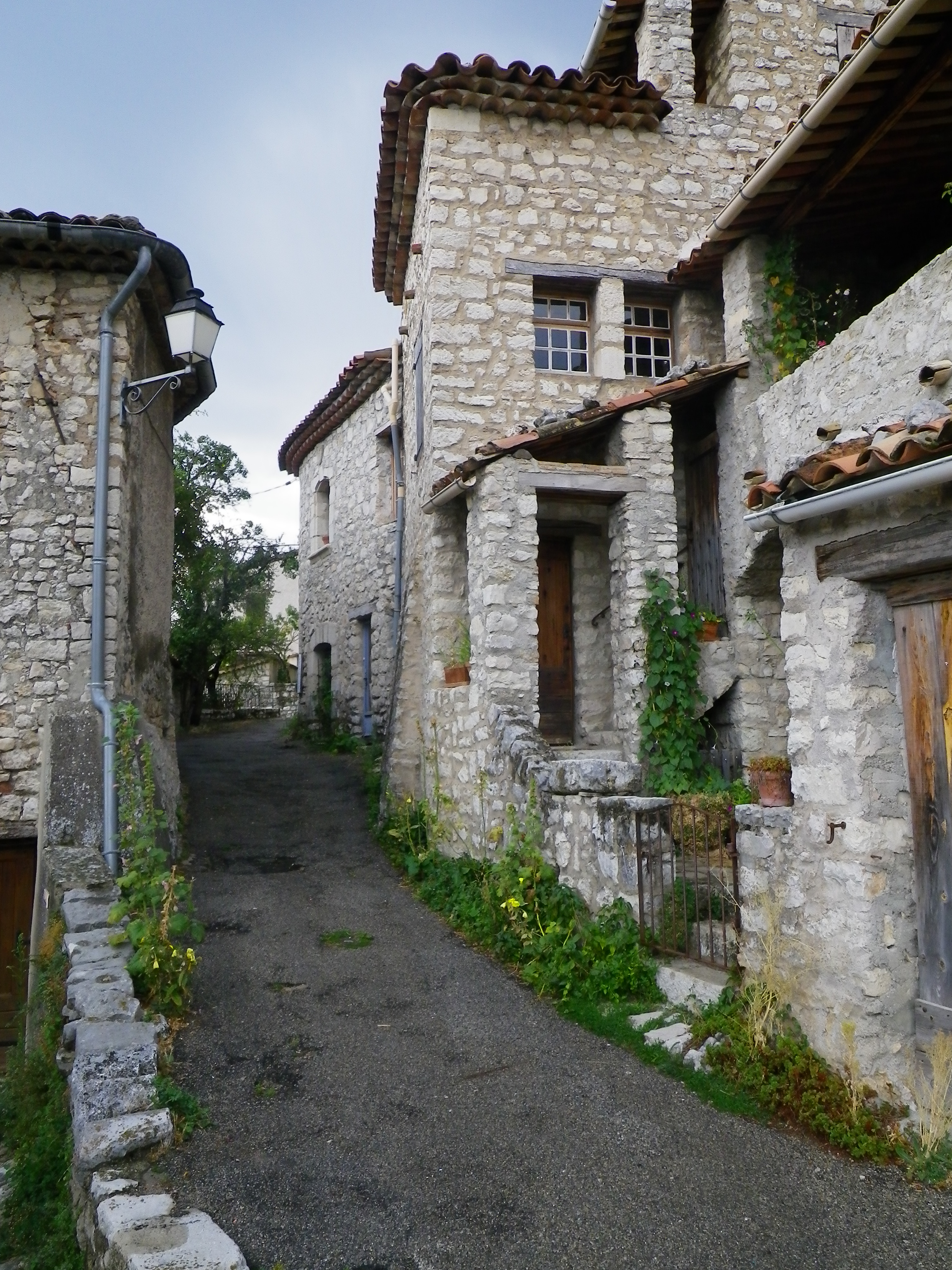
Street in Trigance

In 1760, a tax imposed by the king of Piedmont-Sardinia on sales of cloth brought a large reduction in the town's textile production. Production of cadis, a local form of wool, and of cordeillat, a coarse woolen fabric, continued until the Revolution, and was used by the local residents.

Until the Revolution salt was produced from two local salt marshes.

On the eve of the French Revolution, several fiefs existed on the actual territory of the commune: Éoulx, Le Castellet-de-Robion (which became a barony in 1755), Chasteuil, Taulanne and Castillon, plus Castellane. On the same territory there were nine parishes: Castillon, La Baume, Taulanne, La Palud, Chasteuil, Taloire, Villars-Brandis, Robion, et Castellane. The parish of Éoulx overlapped the community of La Garde.

The city of Castellane alone paid more tax than Digne; it was an important rural town, both for its judiciary functions (with eight lawyers and five prosecutors) and for its production, with twelve factories: among which were six hat shops, two wax factories, one faïence works, one tile factory, one silk fabrication works, and the leather industry was also represented. A royal post office was also installed in Castellane near the end of the Ancien Régime.

=== 19th century ===
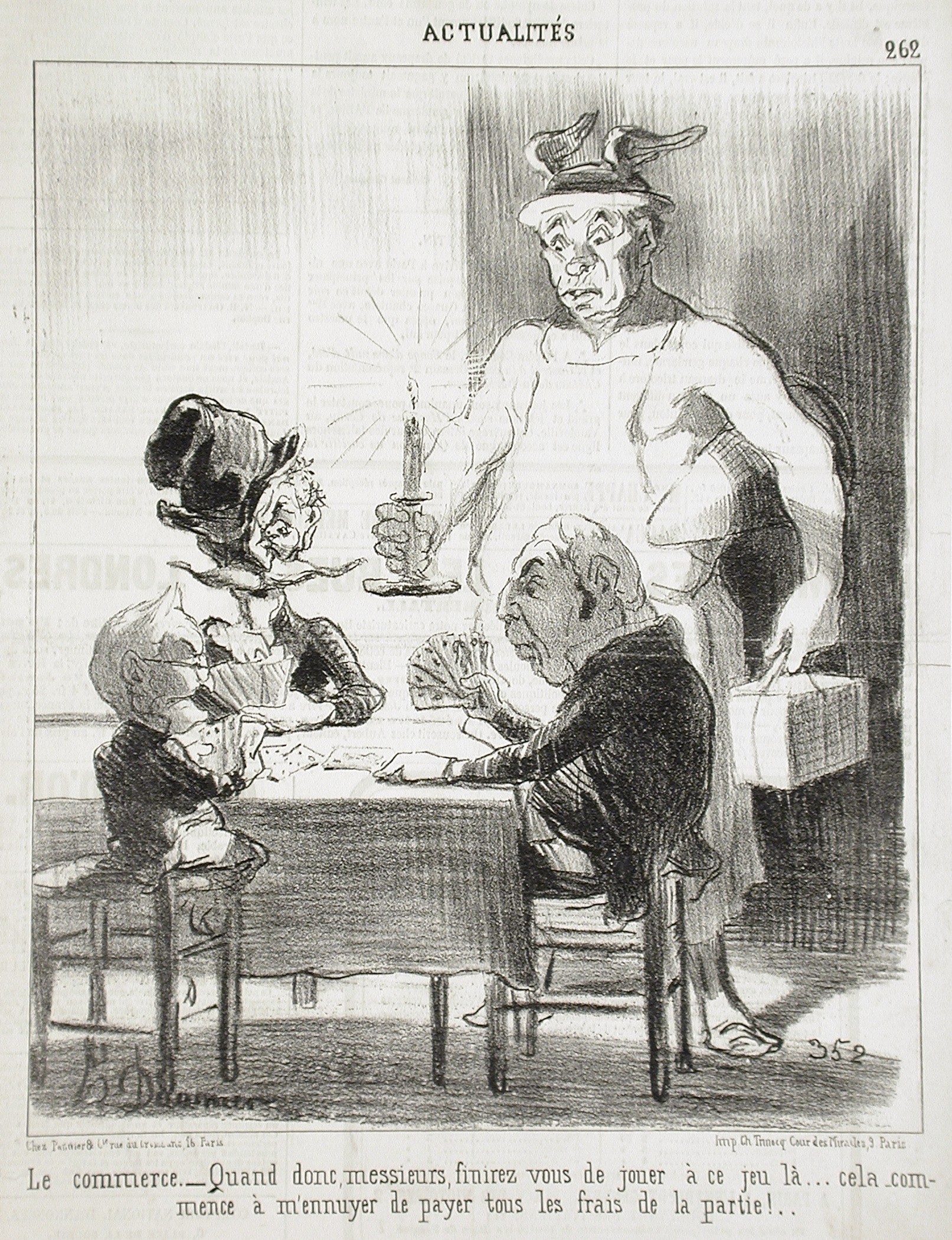
Political cartoon in Le Charivari, 2 December 1851. The caption says "When are you going to stop playing these games? I am getting tired of paying for them."

The cloth industry, already well established in the preceding century, prospered in the first half of the 19th century. But cottage industries were replaced by the Barneaud factory, built in the late 1830s on the model of the Honnorat factory in Saint-André-de-Méouilles. It employed nine workers in 1872, then disappeared in 1878.

The Revolution and the Empire brought social reforms, including proportional taxation based on the assets. In order to put this in place on a precise basis, a land registry was drawn up. The loi de finances du 15 septembre 1807 specified its methods, but its accomplishment took time to get started, since the officials conducting the cadastre dealt with the communes in successive geographic groups. Not until 1834–1835 was the land registry known as the Napoleonic cadastre of Castellane and its associated communes finished.

The coup d'état of 2 December 1851 committed by Louis-Napoléon Bonaparte against the Second Republic provoked an armed uprising in the Basses-Alpes in defense of the Constitution. Insurgent republicans took a number of cities in the center and south of France, including Digne, the prefecture of the Basses-Alpes, and held them for several days. The local fighters held out the longest, almost three weeks. But this allowed Bonaparte to portray himself as the protector of France, and many participants were sent to penal colonies in Lambesa and Cayenne, banished or less permanently exiled. Eight inhabitants of Castellane were brought before the commission mixte; their most common penalty was deportation to Algeria.

=== 20th century ===
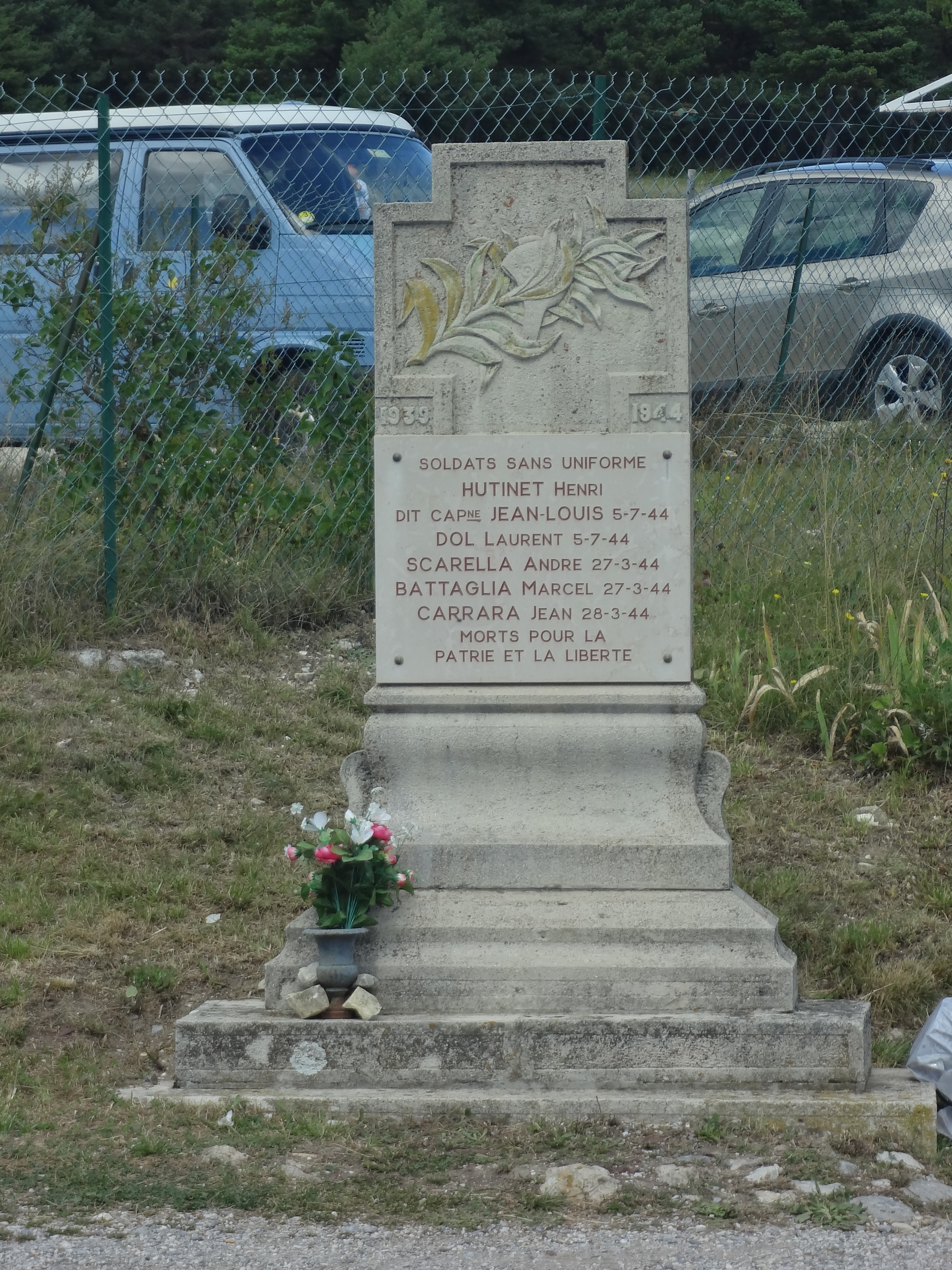
Memorial to FTP fighters

On 10 September 1926, the sous-préfecture was eliminated in the economic plan of Raymond Poincaré, then re-established by the Vichy government in June 1942.

An internment camp was built in Chaudanne during World War II. Seventeen Jews were arrested in Castellane and deported. On 9 December 1943, the French armée secrète (AS) and the Francs-tireurs et partisans (FTP) attacked the construction site at the Castillon dam and seized five tonnes of explosives.

The commune was liberated 18 August 1944 by the 36th division of British infantry.

In the mid-20th century wine growing for local consumption ended.

== Demographics ==
Historical population
Year	Pop.	±% p.a.
1968	1,181	—
1975	1,234	+0.63%
1982	1,383	+1.64%
1990	1,349	−0.31%
1999	1,508	+1.25%
2007	1,604	+0.77%
2012	1,557	−0.59%
2017	1,524	−0.43%
2023	1,472	−0.58%
Source: INSEE

== Sites and monuments ==
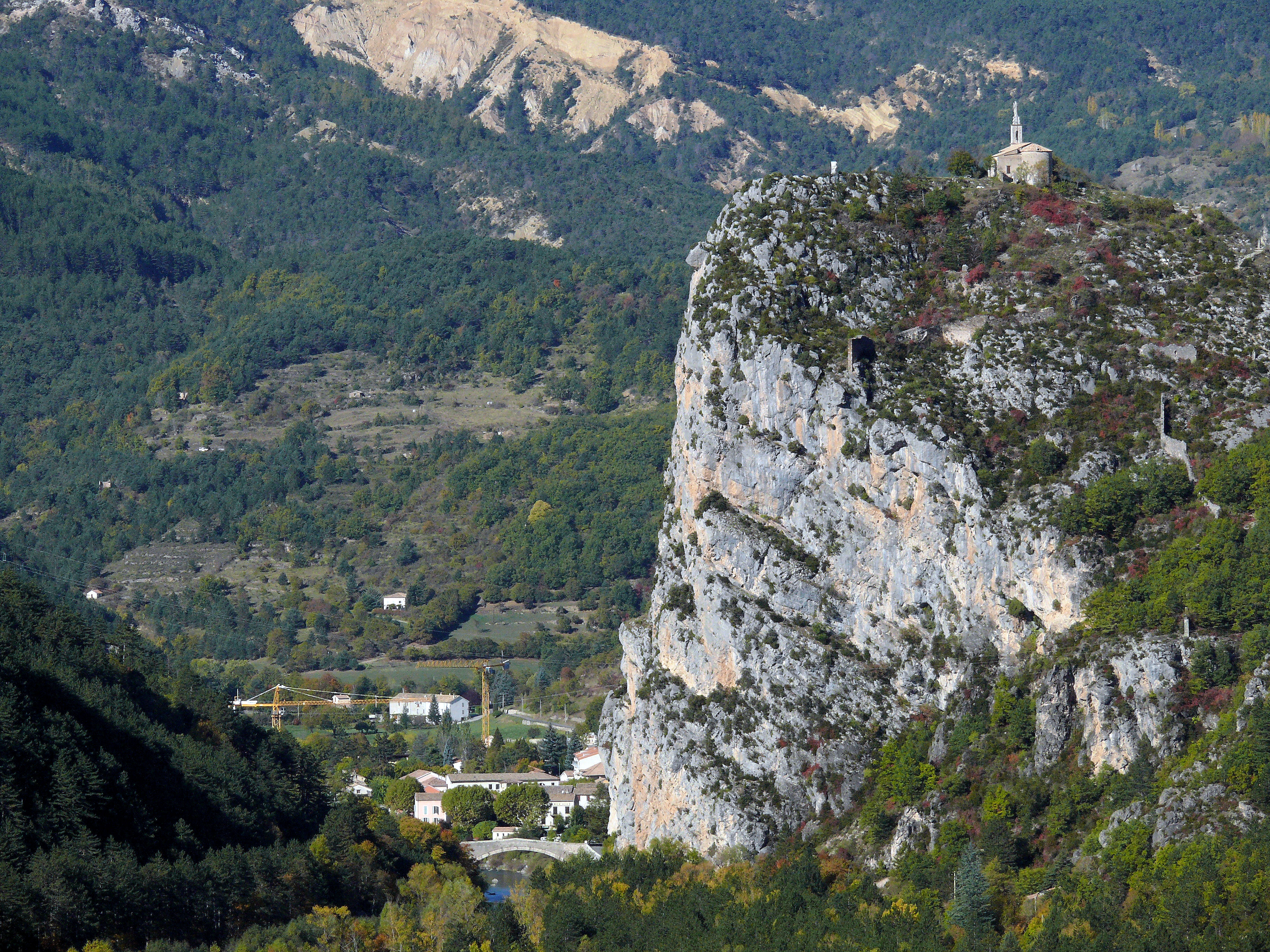
The Roc and the bridge of the Roc

The Rock which dominates the city, rising to 930 metres (3,051 feet) (over 200 metres (656 feet) above the Verdon), is a listed historical site.

The oldest monument in the territory of the commune is the dolmen of Pierres Blanches Neolithic-Chalcolithic, a registered historical site on private property. The Roc towers 184 metres (604 feet) above the community of Castellane.

The Musée des sirènes et fossiles and the Moyen Verdon are networked with other museums in the Gorges du Verdon, including the home of Pauline Gréoux-les-Bains, the museum of the life of yesteryear Esparron-de-Verdon, home gorges du Verdon in La Palud-sur-Verdon and the Museum of prehistory in Quinson gorges du Verdon.

=== Architecture ===
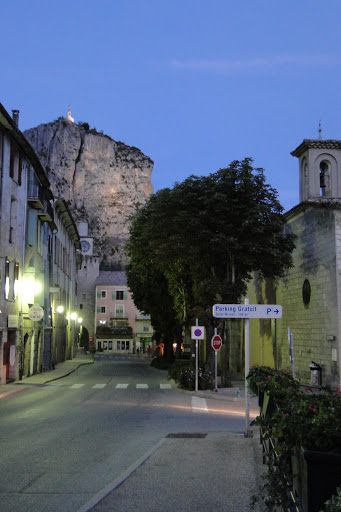
In the city of Castellane

The bridge of the Roc, which carries the Sisteron-Vence road across the river, was built in the first decade of the fifteenth century, replacing a succession of several wooden bridges, the last spanning the Verdon in 1300 and destroyed by Raymond VIII of Turenne in 1390. The construction of the new bridge parallels that of Nyons (built in 1401, 42 m (138 ft) long), Pont de Claix (built in 1607–13, 45 m (148 ft) long), Tournon (built in the sixteenth century, 49 m (161 ft) long) and Entrechaux (24.5 m (80.4 ft) long). Pope Benedict XIII granted indulgences to anyone who gave alms to finance its construction. The rearguard of the Austrian-Sardinian army was caught there by a sortie from the garrison.

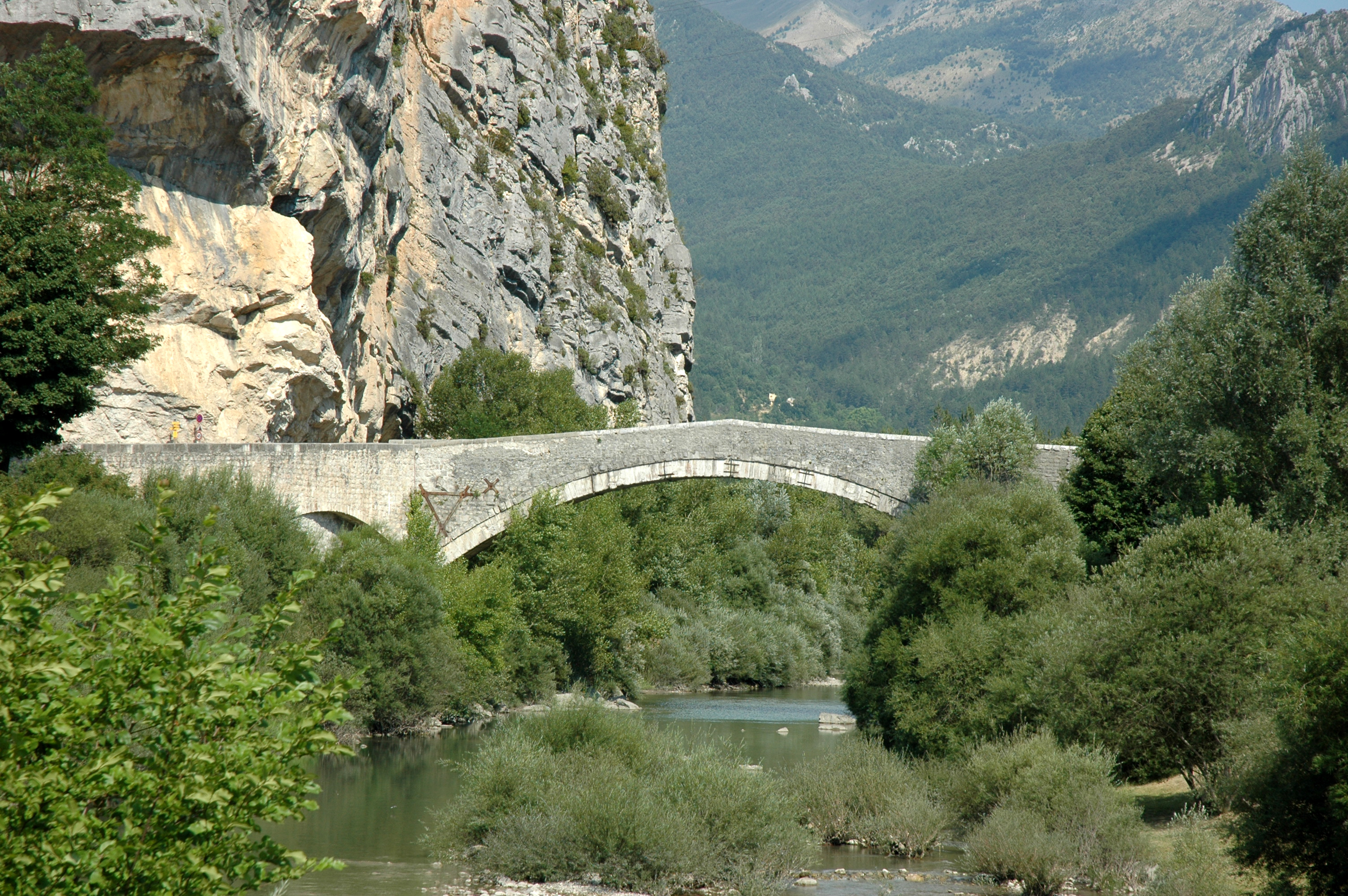
Bridge of the Roc

The tympana of the Roc bridge have been restored several times. Metal tie rods were laid in 1697–99. The bridge as a whole was restored in 2008 and closed to traffic. It was decommissioned in 1967 and delisted in 1982. The bridge and its approaches have been a registered historical site since 1940.

The library is in the former convent of the Visitation, founded in 1644. The eighteenth-century castle at Éoulx is richly decorated with plasterwork, including the first floor ceilings, the panels surrounding the doors, the rosette in the second-floor ceilings. Externally, it has two towers, with arched openings. The town hall is housed in the building that used to be the savings bank. It resembles a villa: balconies supported by large corbels and thick balusters, and a façade adorned with a pediment.

Catellane's largest fountain, in the main square, features a pyramid on which is carved a compass crossed by a carpenter's square, two chisels and a mallet, emblems of the Freemasons. At the top of the pyramid is a pedestal with a ball. On National Street, two doors have transoms or capitals with volutes, and one lintel is decorated with carved foliage. In the town, several buildings, mostly dry stone, have been recorded in the inventory of topographic DRAC. One of them, in Rayaup, dates from the eighteenth century (the inscription that says 1586 is very recent).

=== Notre-Dame du Roc ===
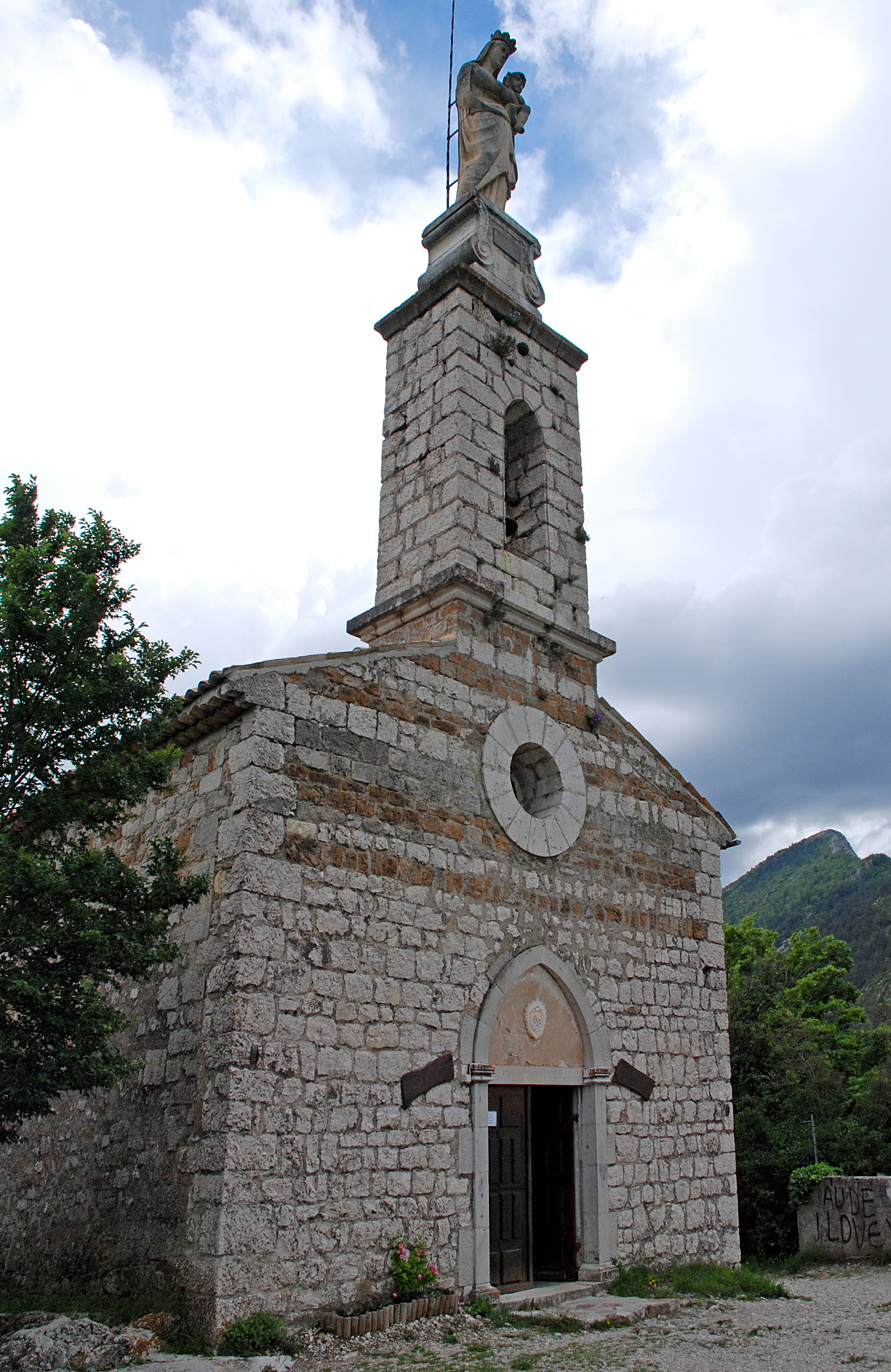
Notre Dame du Roc

The Chapel of Our Lady of the Rock, dating from the High Middle Ages, dominates the city from atop the Rock and belongs to the former Convent of Mercy. But only the wall and the south façade date from the twelfth century; the building was half demolished during the wars of religion and rebuilt in 1590.

Crumbling by 1703, the chapel was again rebuilt in the early eighteenth century and once more in 1860. A capital adorned with foliage and scrolls dates from the Renaissance.

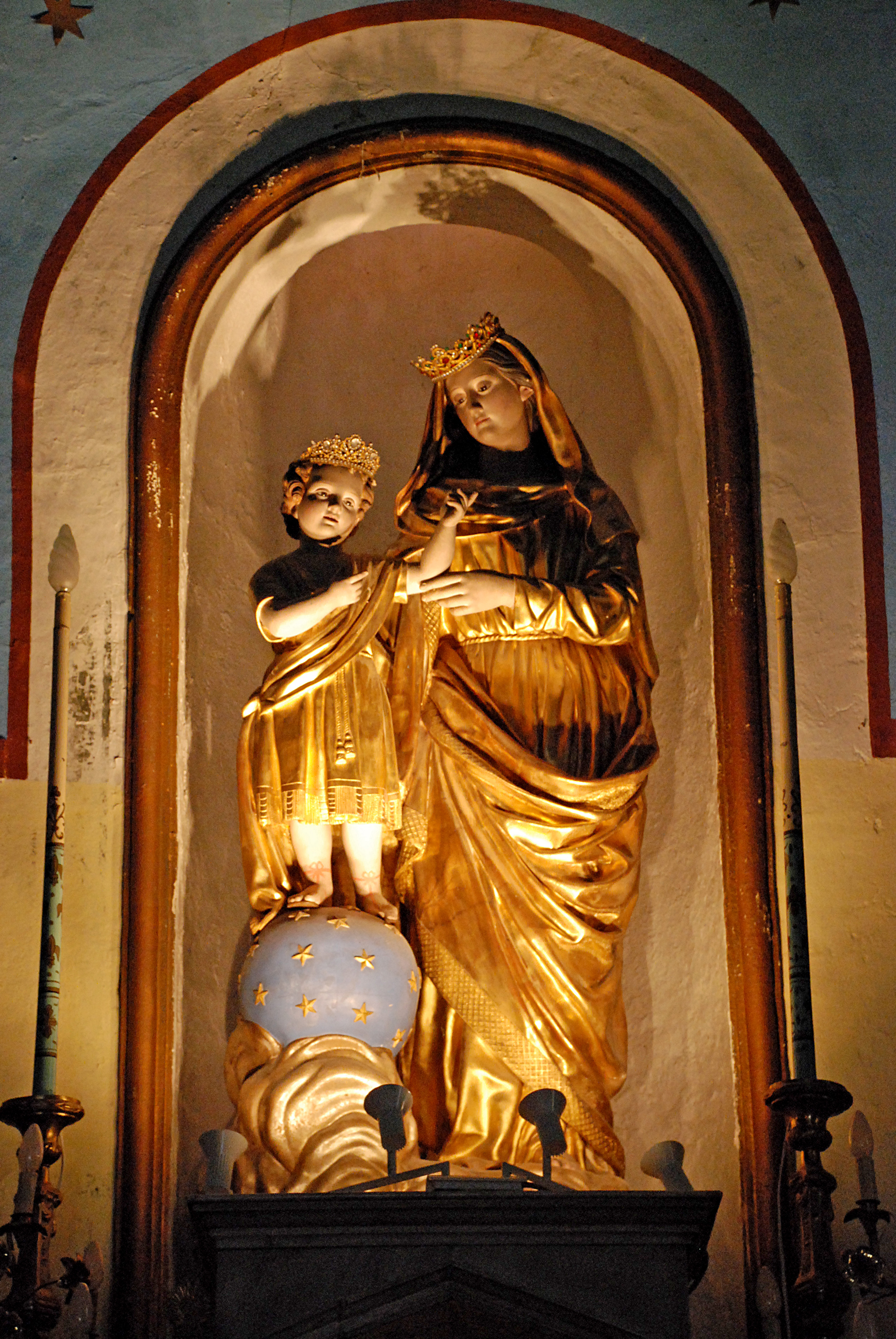

The furnishings include:

- a statue of the Virgin, in marble, possibly 16th century
- two paintings, St. Charles Borromeo and St. Francis and St. Jeanne de Chantal, on the historic register for both the paintings and their gilded frames, bearing the arms of the Bishop of Senez Duchaîne and dating from the seventeenth century.

It received numerous votive offerings in the 19th and 20th centuries, including:

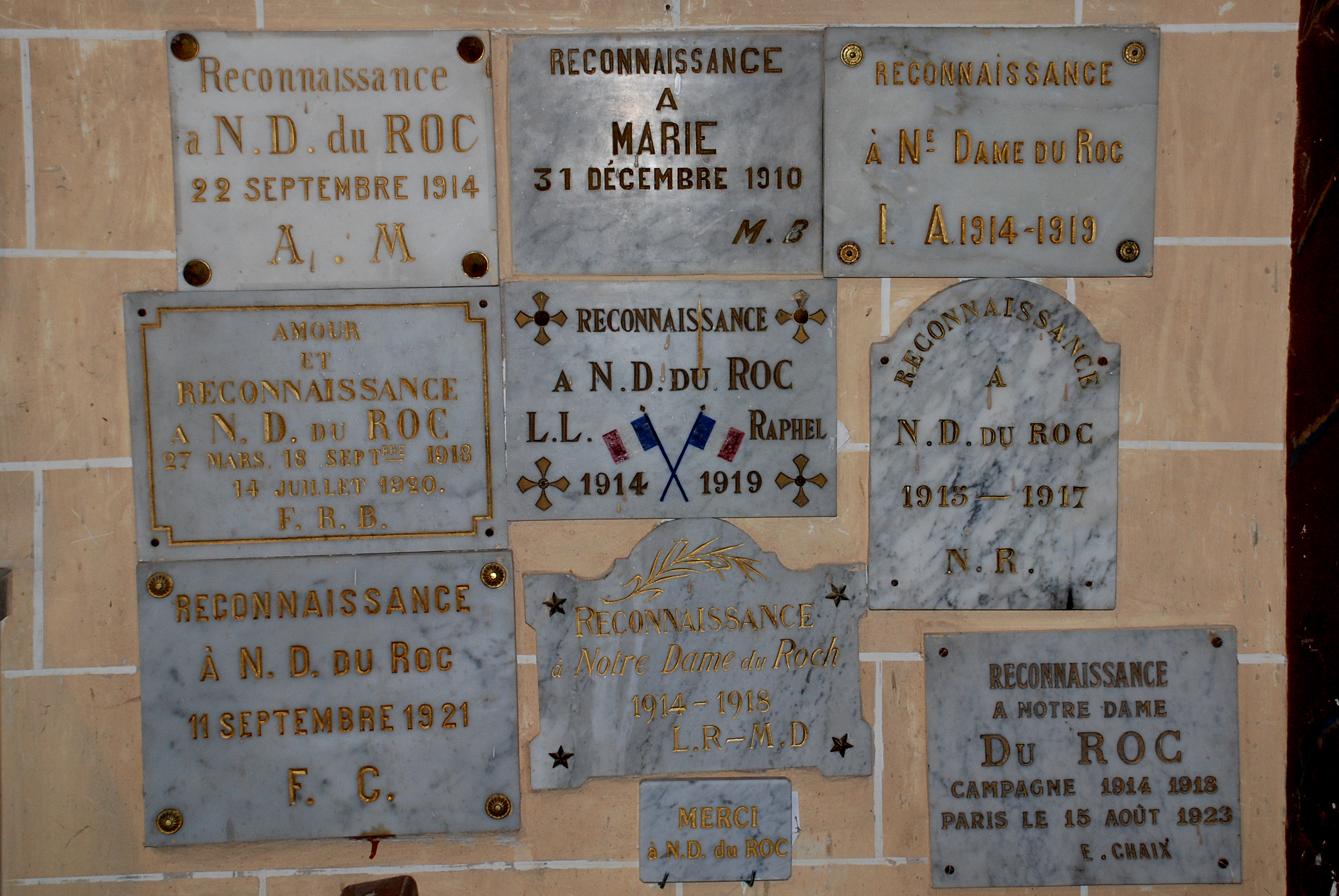
Votive offerings

- traditional engraved plates (136 total);
- bridal bouquets (21 total);
- a painting given after a vow to Our Lady, dating from 1757, and registered;
- a painting given after the cholera epidemic in 1835, registered;
- a painting given by a released prisoner, dated 1875 (registered);
- a painting given in thanks after a smallpox epidemic, dated 1870, registered;
- a painting given by a person who escaped a shipwreck in 1896, registered.

=== Saint-Victor ===
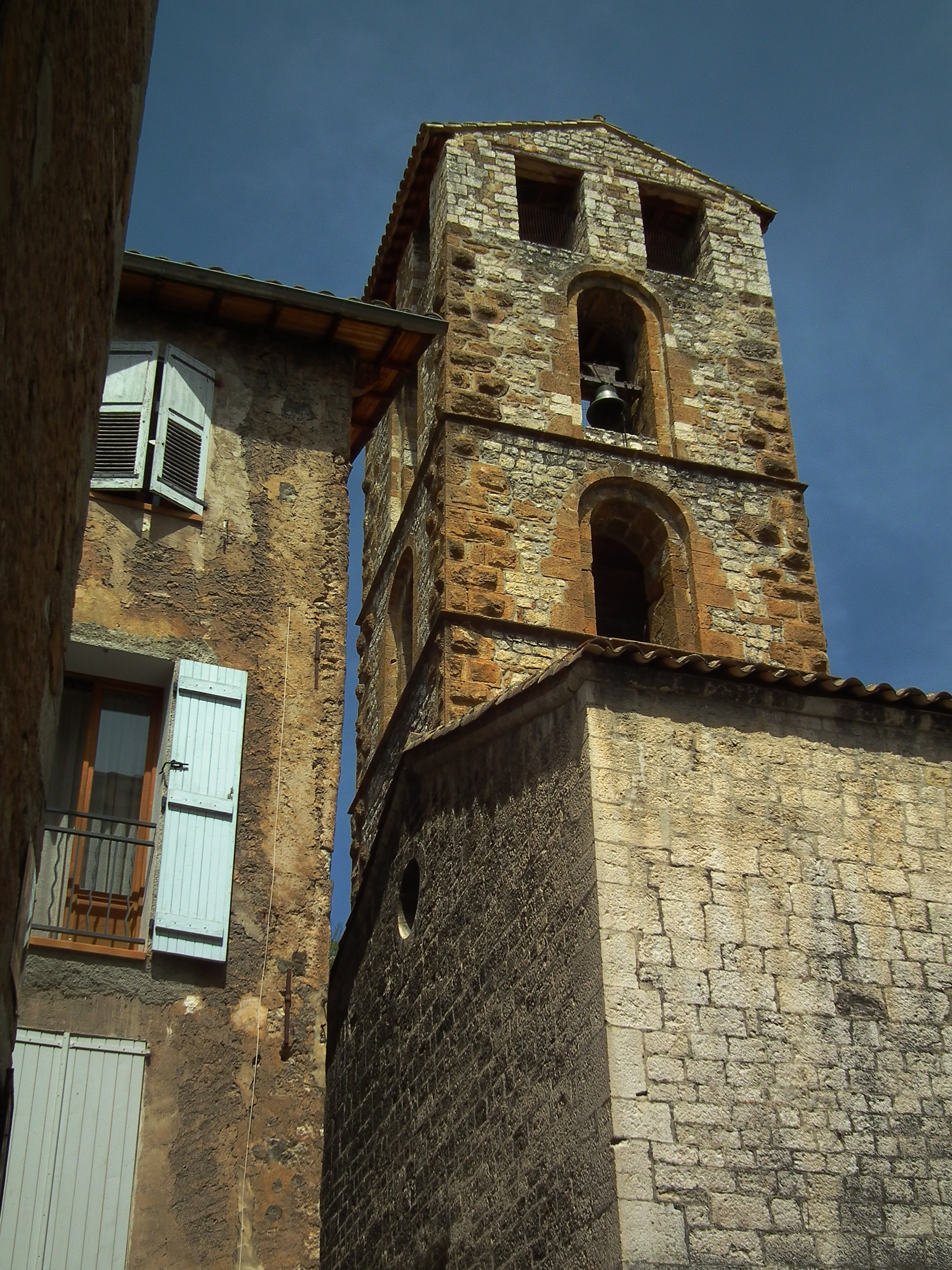
Saint Victor

Parts of the old parish church of Saint-Victor date from the mid-11th century. It is listed as an historical building. It was constructed in a similar manner and on the same plane as the Church of St. Andrew in the old village above the modern-day town, and was formerly the seat of a priory of the Abbey of St. Victor in Marseille.

The apse is decorated with Lombard bands, which have been described as remarkable, each arch carved from a single stone. Unusually for the region, it has a Roman nave, with arches rebuilt in the 17th century. The base of the tower dates from 1445, but its top was rebuilt in the 18th century following damage by Protestants in 1560.

The altar dates from 1724. The choir is adorned with paintings framed in wood, and an Annunciation carved in relief from gilded wood (18th century, on historical register). The wooden furniture, the stalls, the pulpit and the lectern with its hexagonal base, form an interesting 18th and 19th-century set, some of which is on the historic register. The furnishings also include an early 17th-century silver chalice with an unusual multilobed foot, also on the historic register.

=== Other historic churches ===
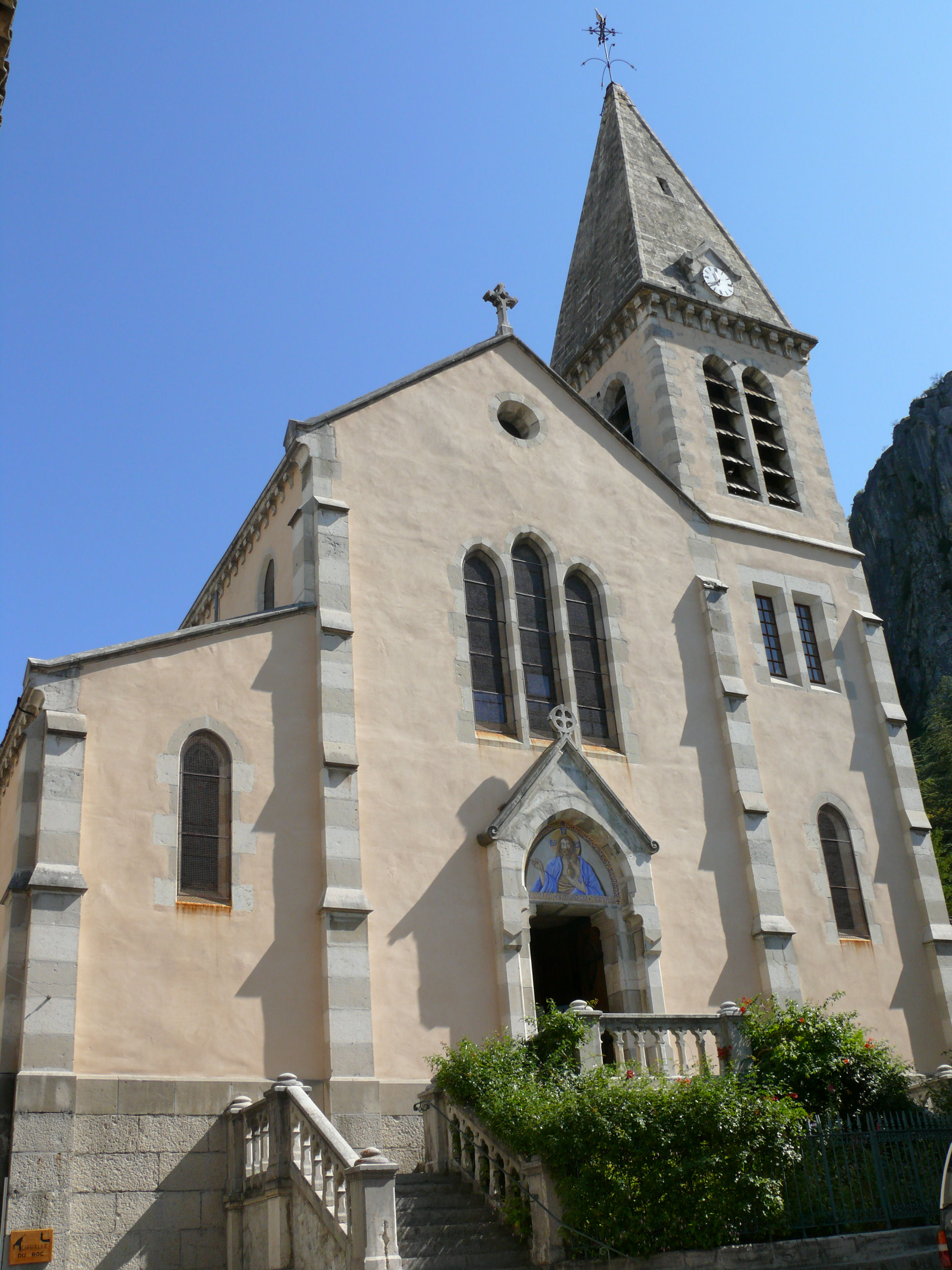
Sacré-Coeur

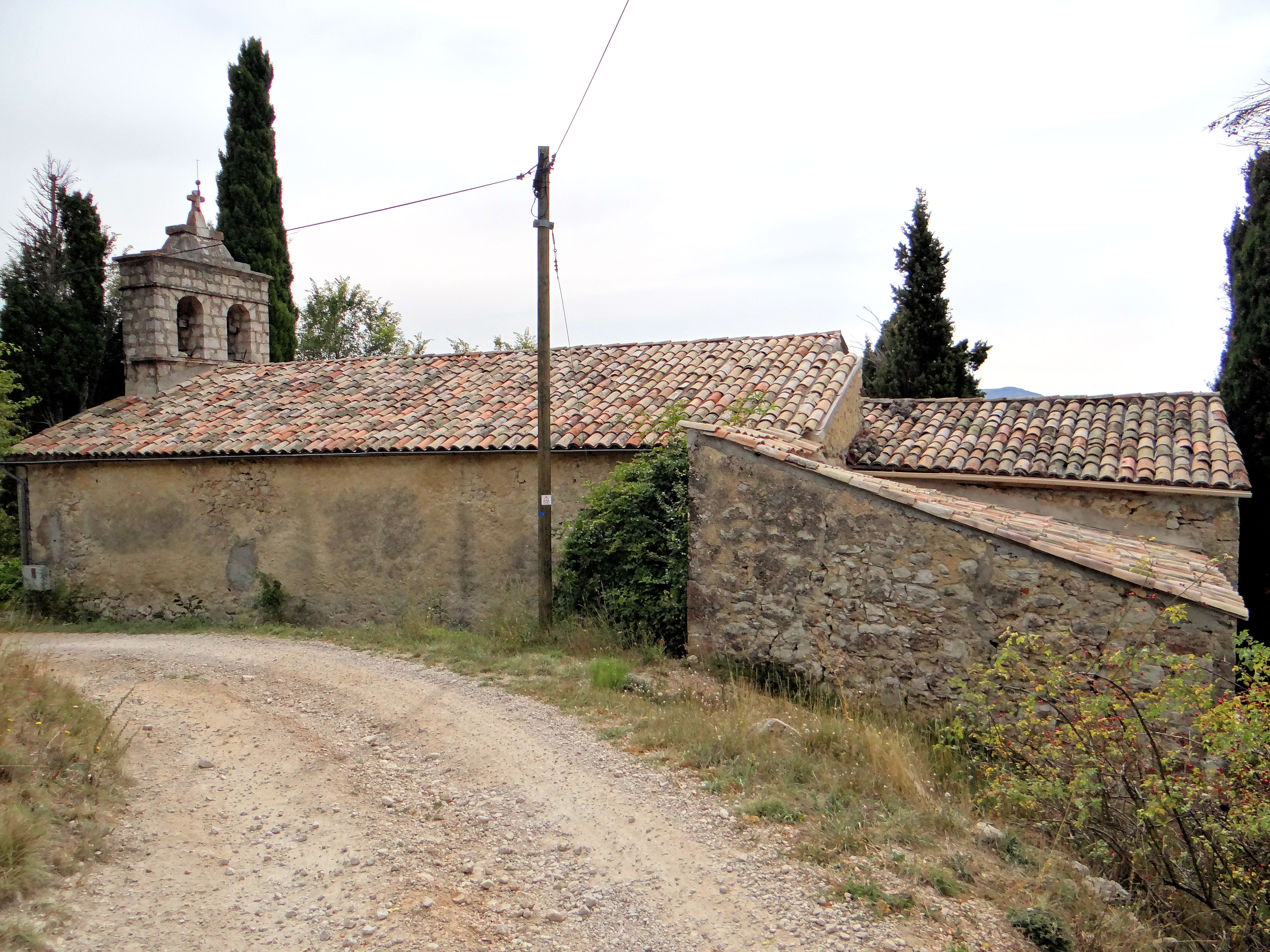
Saint Pons in Éoulx

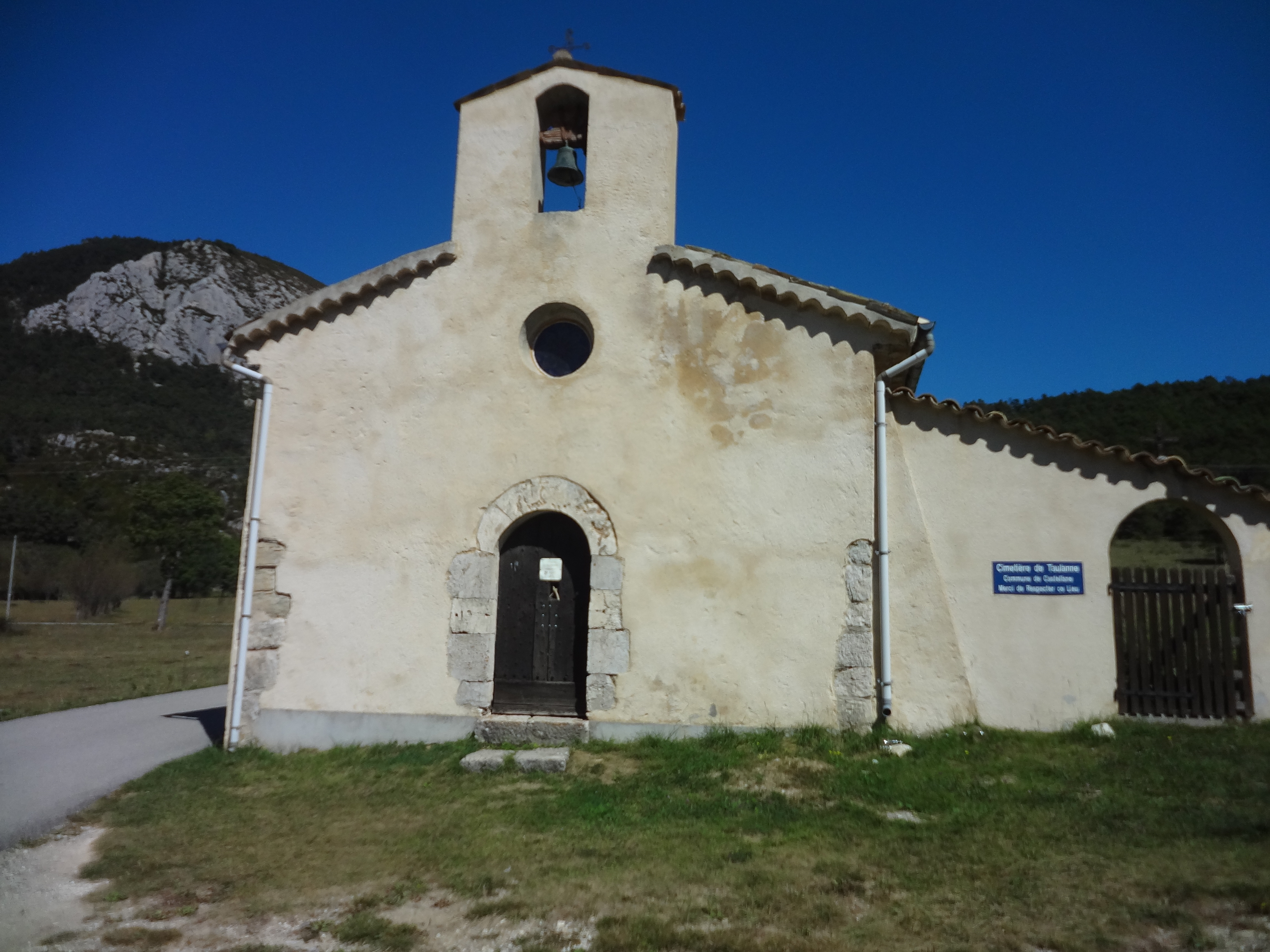
Saint Pierre de Taulanne

- The Church of the Sacred Heart, now a parish church, was built in 1868–1873 by Father Pougnet and dedicated to Our Lady. It was widened by side aisles in 1896. The first transept is occupied by a platform. The interior is Gothic, with the tower built against the façade. The furnishings include some registered historical items:two silver custodes, cases for carrying communion hosts; one dating from around 1650 and one from the 18th century, a gilded wooden 18th-century cross, and a 16th-century silver chalice

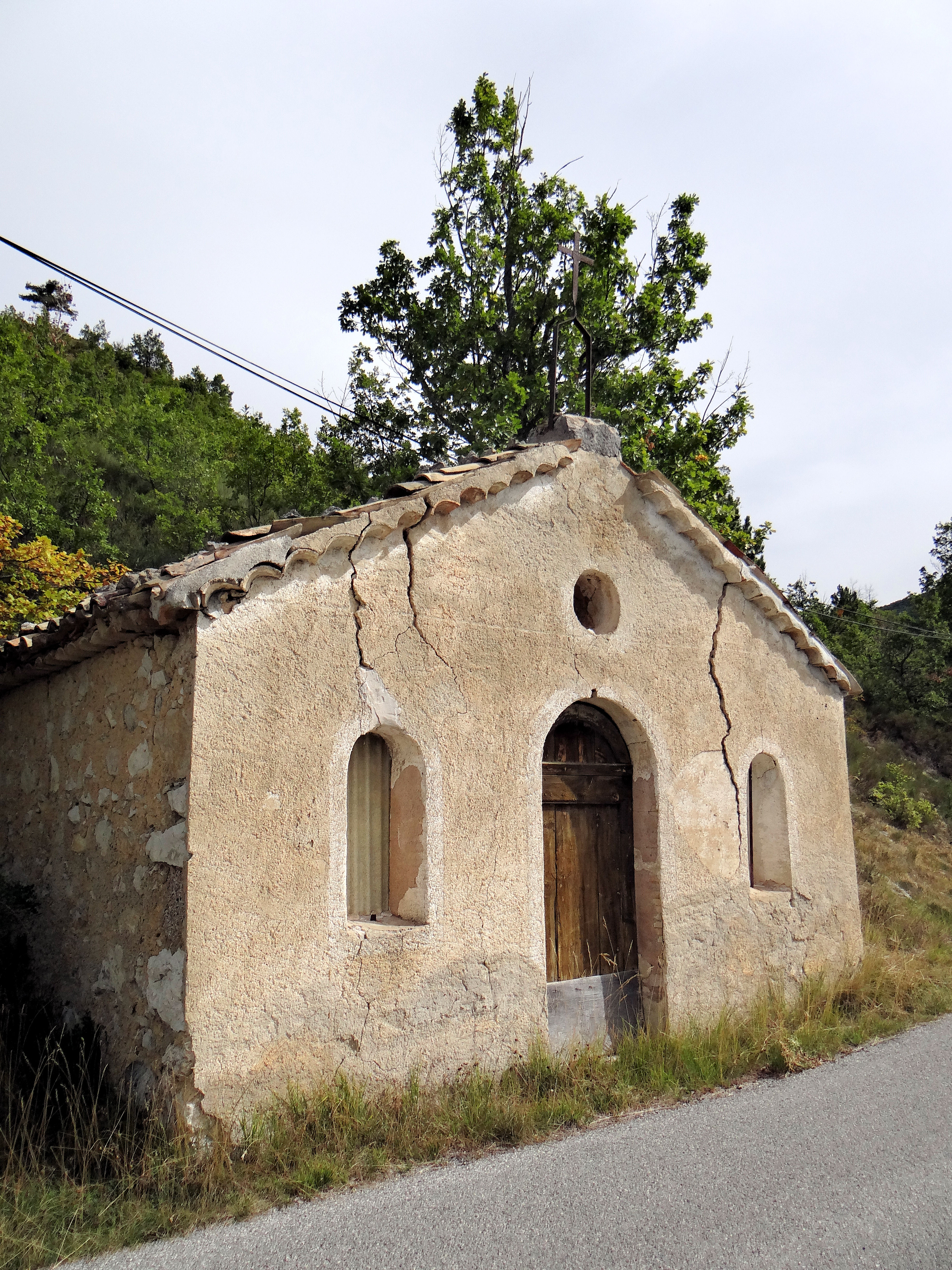
Saint Antoine of Éoulx

- the Chapel of St. Joseph is part of the Augustinian church rebuilt to replace the chapel of the Blue Penitents. It was partly demolished to widen the boulevard Saint-Michel
- the 12th-century Saint Thyrse Chapel near Robion was restored in 1942 and declared a historical monument in 1944, It is the earliest Romanesque (11th and 12th centuries) church in the region.
- Saint-Pons in Eoulx, unchanged since its construction, not arched, has preserved the original cornices from the middle or late twelfth century, also the thirteenth century according to the Direction régionale des affaires culturelles (DRAC). This building is on the historic register. It has a flat copper collection plate believed to be 17th-century

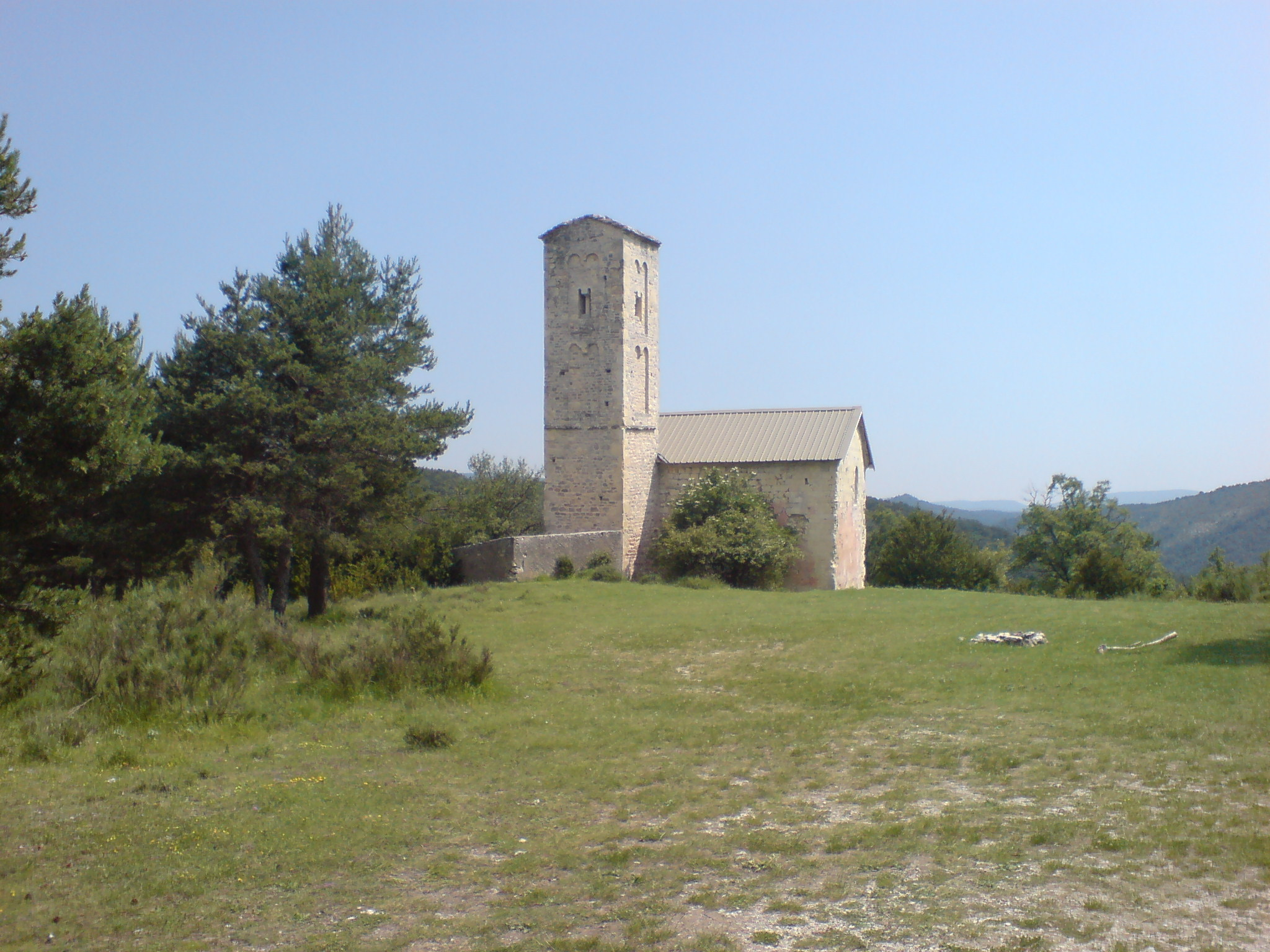
Saint Thyrse

- ruins of the Church of St. André – 13th century, in ruins since the 18th century (site of Petra Castellana)
- The 12th-century church of Notre-Dame-du-Plan, a former priory in Castellane
- Church of St. Sebastian Chasteuil (16th century)
- Saint-Pons – 16th century, with bell dated 1436, in Robion
- Saint-Jean in Taloire, may have been built as early as the 13th or 14th century, but the 15th century seems more likely. It was damaged by the earthquake of 1951.
- St. Pierre in Taulanne
- Saint-Jean-Baptiste in Villars-Brandis has an exceptional late 15th-century copper thurible (a type of censer) with bilevel windows.
- Chapelle Sainte-Victoire in a place called Angles: late 19th century at the earliest
- chapels of Saint-Pons Blaron (ex-Castillon), Saint-Antoine and Notre Dame (ruined) in Eoulx,
- St. Trophimus, built into the mountain above Petit Robion after a chapel built below was repeatedly damaged by rocks falling onto its roof, has a 17th-century silver chalice and a flat copper 16th-century collection plate, both registered historical items.
- St. Stephen, on high ground in Taloire
- St. John, in Villars
- the cemetery Notre-Dame-du-Plan includes several funeral chapels

=== Military architecture ===
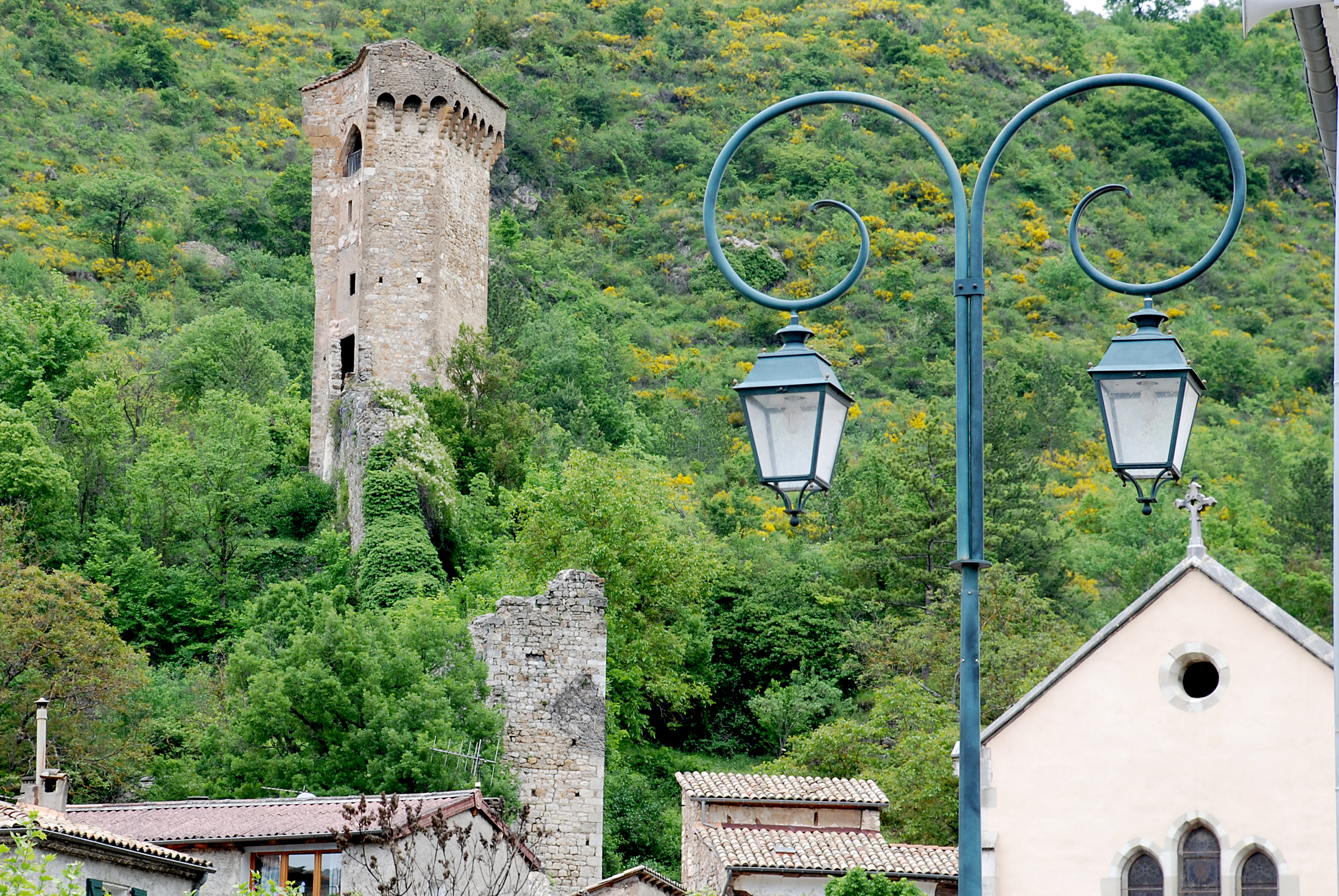
Pentagonal tower

The outline of the walls of Petra Castellana, the ancient city beneath the current one, is still visible, and in places they reach seven meters in height. The walls are thought to date from the 12th century, although a June 2016 archeological excavation sought to date them more precisely. Only one tower survives of the fourteen that originally reinforced these walls: the 14th-century pentagonal keep. This keep, which dominates the town center, is on private property but was declared a historic monument in 1921.

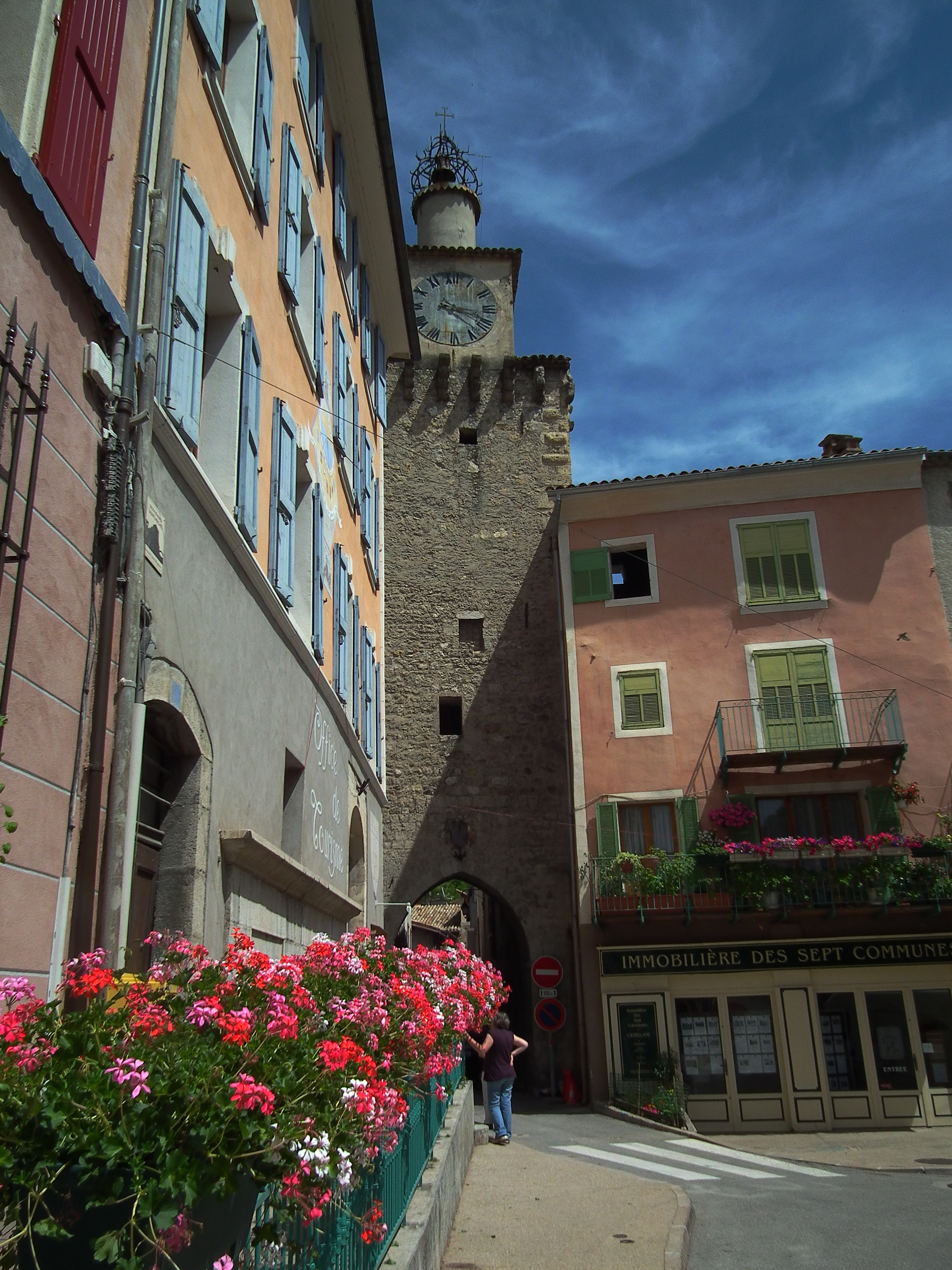
Tour de l'Horloge

Construction on the wall enclosing the lower town began in 1359, with the permission of the Count of Provence, Louis I of Naples. Traces of this wall are still visible in the square towers on the front of the houses on the square. Corbels, which could support defenses (brattices or simple parapets with battlements) are visible on their façades.

Two of the original gates in the wall remain:

- the gate of the Annunciation or of the pétardiers, flanked by two towers, high ground in the resistance of 1586;
- the gate of the clock, also called St. Augustine's gate, set in a square tower. A passage crosses under the tower through an arch. The tower is listed on the register of historic places.

One of the towers in the Saint-Michel neighborhood has been home to a dovecote since 1585.

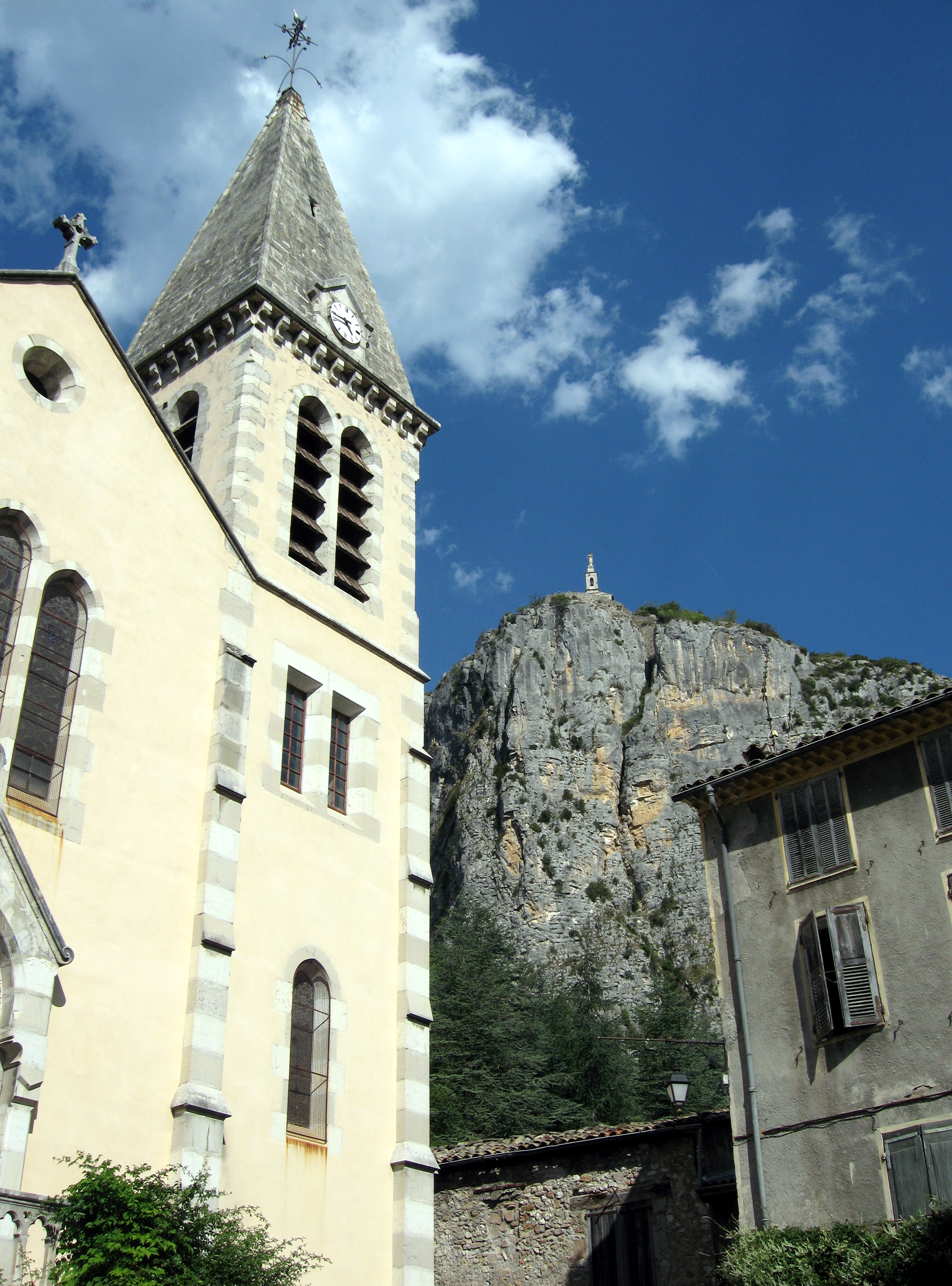
Castellane with the Église St Denis on "Le Roc"

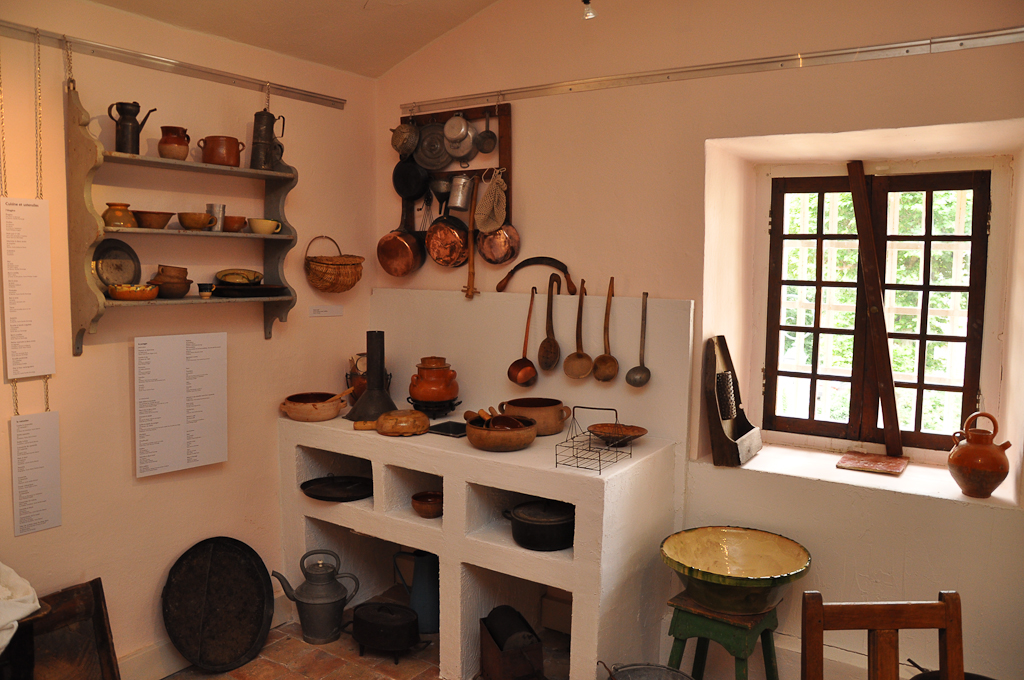
An old Provençal kitchen, reproduced at a Castellane museum

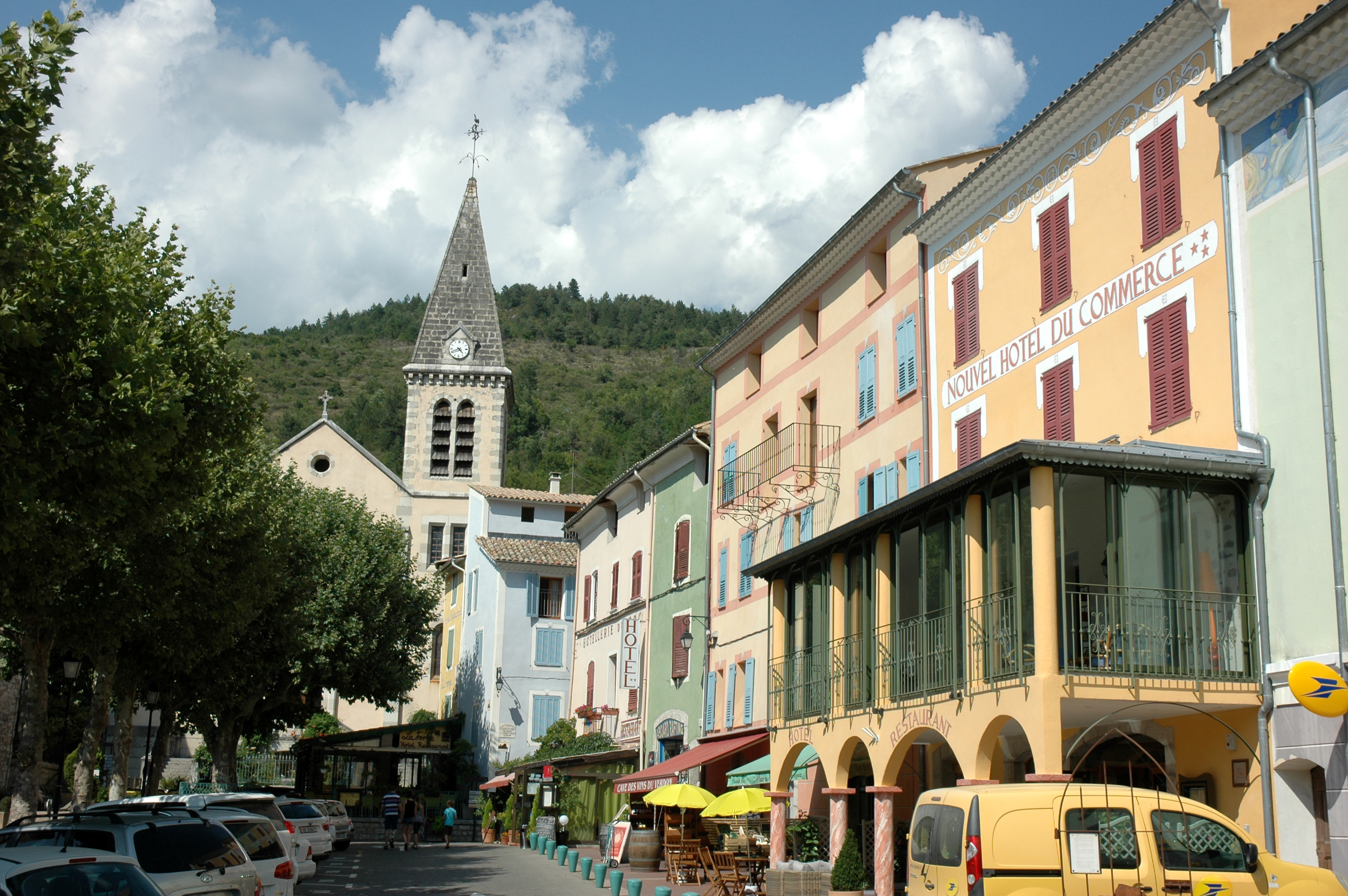
Sacred Heart church

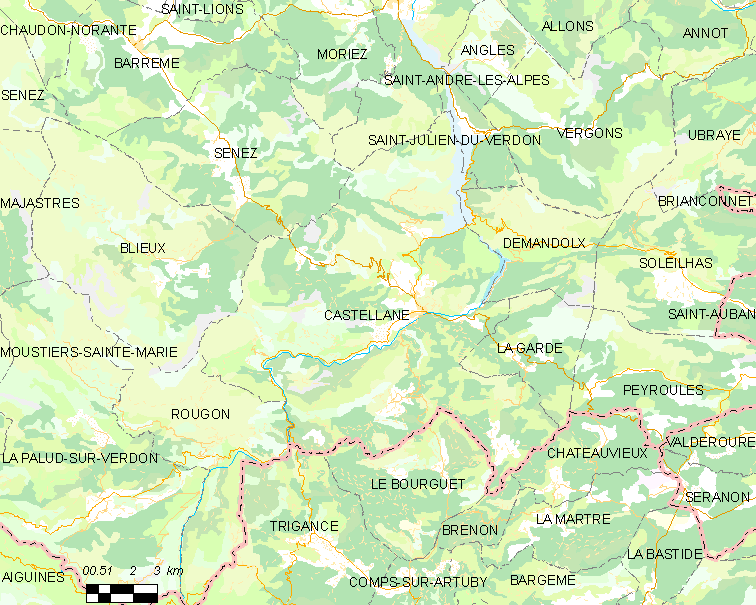
Map of Castellane and surrounding communities

== International relations ==
Castellane is twinned with Pescasseroli, Italy.

== See also ==
- Route Napoléon
- House of Castellane
- Communes of the Alpes-de-Haute-Provence department
