= Pont de l'Artuby =

Artuby Bridge Pont de l'Artuby
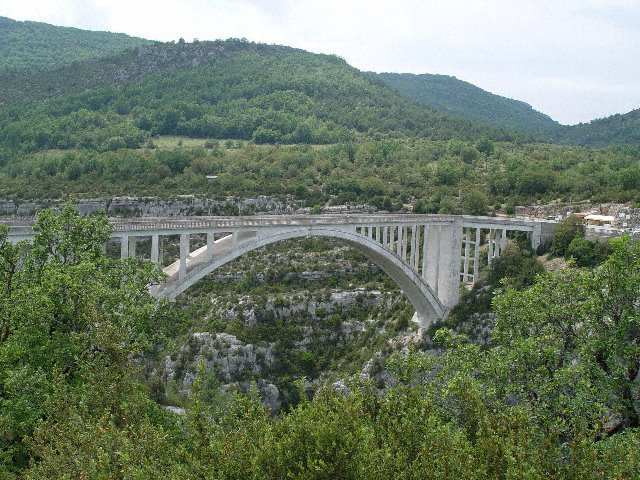
- Coordinates: 43°43′48″N 6°23′15″E
- Carries: Motor vehicles, Pedestrians and cyclists
- Crosses: Artuby
- Locale: near Aiguines and Trigance, Var, France

Characteristics
- Design: Arch bridge, Truss bridge
- Material: Concrete and Steel
- Total length: 590 feet (180 m)
- Width: 20 feet (6 m)
- Height: 449 feet (137 m)
- Longest span: 360 feet (110 m)
- Clearance below: 360 feet (110 m)

History
- Construction start: 1938
- Construction end: 1940
- Opened: 1946

Location
- Interactive map of Artuby Bridge

Pont de l'Artuby, also called Pont sur l'Artuby or Pont de Chaulière, is a two-lane road bridge that connects Route D 71 to the Artuby Gorge in the Var department in the French region of Provence-Alpes-Côte d'Azur. The nearest towns are Aiguines and Trigance, which are 22 and 13 km (13.7 and 8.1 mi) away respectively.

== Description ==
Pont de l'Artuby consists of a large reinforced concrete arch with a span of 110 m (360 ft), on which the carriageway slab is lined with slender, unadorned stanchions. The arrow height of the bow is 24 m (79 ft). The arch is framed by comparatively slim piers; short slab-beam bridges on the sides of the slopes, which are supported by equally unadorned supports, provide the connection to the streets.

The bridge is used for bungee jumping. The height of the bridge over the valley floor is usually 180 m (590 ft). Due to the height information in a topographical map, it is probably only 137 m (449 ft).

== History ==
At the end of the 1930s, the Corniche Sublime (today's D 71) was built to open up the remote area around the Gorges du Verdon for tourism. The necessary bridge over the Artuby was largely completed in 1938 to 1940. However, work had to be stopped because of World War II, so that the route could only be opened in 1946.

The bridge was designed by the Pelnard-Considère et Caquot office and designed by Thorrand et Cie. built from Nice . The falsework was formed from two trussed segments each weighing 60 tons, which were first mounted on the Imposts in a vertical position and lowered on 17 April 1939 with ropes into the arched position above the gorge.
