= Giuseppe Sasia =

Italian criminal and serial killer

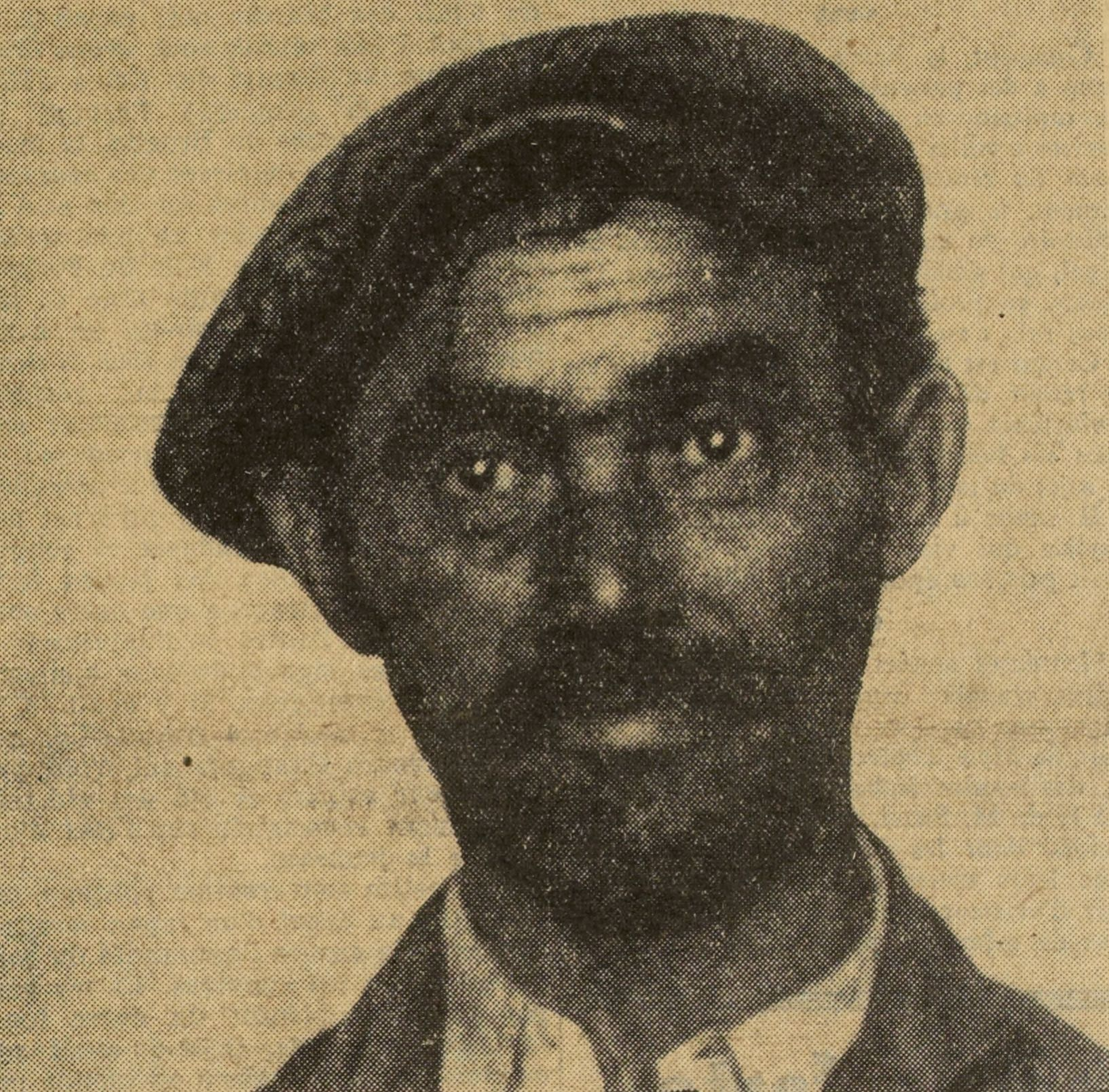
- Undated photograph of Sasia
- Born: 26 May 1886; Rossana, Piedmont, Italy
- Died: 17 February 1936 (aged 49); Draguignan, France
- Cause of death: Execution by guillotine
- Other names: "The Shepherds' Killer" "The Haut-Var Killer"
- Conviction: Murder
- Penalty: Death

Details
- Victims: 4–5+
- Span of crimes: March – November 1934 (possibly 1930)
- Country: France
- State: Provence-Alpes-Côte d'Azur
- Date apprehended: 7 December 1934

Giuseppe Sasia (26 May 1886 – 17 February 1936), known as The Shepherds' Killer and The Haut-Var Killer, was an Italian criminal and serial killer, who, in several months in 1934, killed at least 4 men in Draguignan, France, with the aim of stealing from them. He was later guillotined for his crimes.

== Biography ==
Giuseppe Sasia arrived in France at the end of the 19th century, at the age of 10. His father was an Italian farmer who settled in the country with his family. They moved to Les Arcs, and after his father's death, his mother returned to Italy, while he and his brother sold the family property. He bought another farm with his brother, which they also sold at a big profit. Sasia then bought a restaurant in Les Arcs.

Sasia is known to have committed theft several times and was sentenced for it four times. Sasia lived in a small stone house in the middle of a field. He wasn't very sociable and scared his neighbors, but he did have a girlfriend. He worked for a while at a restaurant in Draguignan, a town where he went to buy ammunition.

At some point, he had an affair with a woman bar owner in Draguignan, who rejected him because he was poor.

== Murders ==
His crimes were committed in a particular area; the journalists grouped them under the name of "The Crimes of Haut-Var".

=== Joseph Roumo ===
Joseph Roumo was murdered in front of his shop in Flayosc, in 1930. He was killed in similar circumstances to the other four victims, but Sasia was never prosecuted for this crime.

=== Marius Vassal ===
While napping near an oak tree in Taradeau, Marius Vassal, a horticulturist, was shot dead on 4 March 1934. His body was later found hidden, and the hundred francs he was carrying on him were gone. At first, the judge indicted a "lunatic" for this killing, who died shortly after his arrest.

=== Fernand Troin ===
Fernand Troin was murdered in Flayosc, on 5 August 1934. The octogenarian was returning home with provisions when he passed by the place where his soon-to-be-killer was hiding. The latter shot Fernand, stealing his food and the ten francs he was carrying. A postwoman who claimed to have seen the killer was later unable to recognize Sasia at trial.

=== Félicien Rouvier ===
Félicien Rouvier, 35, was murdered on 19 October 1934, at Ampus. Sasia, who was familiar with the place, also knew that the shepherd was gone during the day and that he had money on him. He placed himself in an alcove until Rouvier returned with his sheep at nightfall. As he entered the house, he was shot with buckshot, and collapsed on the ground.

Sasia then stole a watch, a handkerchief, and the 137-160 francs, while the victim lay dying.

He confessed to the crime when Rouvier's watch was discovered in his pockets after he was arrested. He claimed to have killed Rouvier as he needed money to pay some fines.

=== Gianni Galliano ===
A 26-year-old chauffeur, Gianni Galliano, who was on a work-related trip, was murdered in Vérignon on 30 November 1934. While searching through Sasia's home, the gendarmes discovered Galliano's glove, leading to the first confessions. Sasia claimed to have had an altercation with the chauffeur on the road to Canjuers. He said that he shouted for Galliano to stop the vehicle and shot him before robbing him and hiding his body. The motive was the same as that in Félicien Rouvier's murder.

== Arrest ==
Sasia was arrested by two policemen patrolling along the railway linking Vidauban to Les Arcs. He was walking around with his rifle by his side, perhaps looking for a new victim, and his attitude provoked the interest of the policemen. His appearance corresponded to the report broadcast eight days earlier. As Sasia could not present a hunting permit, he was taken in by the gendarmerie, to whom he admitted his having hunted without a license, as well as his theft convictions. He claimed to reside in the neighborhood of Nouradons aux Arcs.

The gendarmes discovered on him the watch stolen from the corpse of Félicien Rouvier, prompting Sasia to quickly confess his guilt. He explained that he had premeditated the action, waiting for the shepherd to arrive before killing him. The gendarmes searched his home, where they found six watches, five wallets, and a pair of gloves, which turned out to be Galliano's. Sasia admitted to that murder as well, claiming at first that they had fought, then acknowledging that he killed Gianni so he could rob him. Soon after, he acknowledged the murder of Vassal and Troin but denied responsibility for the 1930 crime.

When presented before the magistrate on the following day, he partly recanted his confession, recognizing only the two crimes for which there was evidence: those of Rouvier and Galliano. He claimed to have committed the crimes so he could pay his fines and evade prison. The investigators discovered two transfers made on the days after the two murders, and the presence of several watches raised concerns about other possible victims.

Sasia declared after his arrest: "I deserve the guillotine". On 18 December, he was charged with four murders, premeditated murder, followed by theft, and highway robbery with aggravated circumstances.

== Trial ==
He was tried before the cour d'assises on 5 November 1935. Sasia acknowledged the murders of Rouvier and Galliano but pleaded self-defence, trying to present it as a failed robbery. He denied being the perpetrator of the other two killings.

Experts testified that all four victims were shot with buckshot at 4–5 metres. The chief doctor of the asylum, Dr. Pierrefeu, noted that Sasia was fully aware of his actions. She declared: "He is a man who possesses to a high degree the feel of material things, and who has the mentality of a man of the woods; he is far from civilized. His mental level is low and, by poaching, he has assimilated men to the animals he was killing. His emotivity is null and his regret is purely verbal. But Sasia is not crazy". Watchmakers, who had repaired Vassal's watch on previous occasions, recognized it when it was shown to them by the gendarmes.

After several minutes of deliberation, jurors found him guilty of the four murders and condemned him to the death penalty. Over five hundred people attended the last day of the trial.

== Execution ==
His clemency was rejected, despite a meeting between his lawyer and the President.

Sasia showed no regret before his conviction. During his detention on death row, he requested the support of an almoner and began to regret his actions. He did not support the approach chosen for his execution and had several crises of despair. After the execution of Niccolini in Avignon, the guillotine was brought to Draguignan.

Sasia was executed on 17 February 1936, at 6:10 on La République Street in front of the Draguignan Prison. While it was deployed in the public square, a large part of the service was set up to prevent the general public from attending the execution.

According to his lawyer, his last words were: "It's annoying to die". His body was later buried at the Draguignan cemetery.

== Controversy over deportation ==
A controversy arose from the fact that Sasia, an Italian national, had been the subject of a deportation order from the gendarmes since his first conviction. This, however, had not been applied; the prefecture's secretary was accused of favouring extremist immigrants, and thereafter removed from office.

== See also ==
- List of French serial killers
- List of serial killers by country
