= Sasía =

Sasía or Sasia is a surname. Notable people with the surname include:

- Giuseppe Sasia (1886–1936), Italian serial killer
- José Sasía (1933–1996), Uruguayan football player
- Leandro Cabrera Sasía (born 1991), Uruguayan football player
- Nazareno Sasia (born 2001), Argentine shot putter
