= Fox-Amphoux =

- Commune
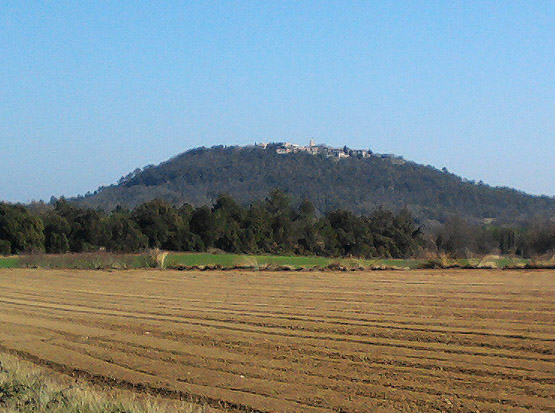
- A general view of the village

- Coat of arms
- Location of Fox-Amphoux
- Location within France Location within Provence-Alpes-Côte d'Azur
- Coordinates: 43°35′52″N 6°05′37″E
- Country: France
- Region: Provence-Alpes-Côte d'Azur
- Department: Var
- Arrondissement: Brignoles
- Canton: Flayosc

Government
  - Mayor (2020–2026): Hubert Geolle
- Area^{1}: 40.76 km^{2} (15.74 sq mi)
- Elevation: 540 m (1,770 ft)
- Highest elevation: 691 m (2,267 ft)
- Lowest elevation: 376 m (1,234 ft)
- Population (2023): 504
  - Density: 12.4/km^{2} (32.0/sq mi)
- Time zone: UTC+01:00 (CET)
  - Summer (DST): UTC+02:00 (CEST)
- INSEE/Postal code: 83060 /83670
- ^{1} French Land Register data, which excludes lakes, ponds, glaciers > 1 km^{2} (0.386 sq mi or 247 acres) and river estuaries.

Fox-Amphoux (French pronunciation: [fɔks ɑ̃fu]; Occitan: Fòs Anfós) is a commune in the Var department in the Provence-Alpes-Côte d'Azur region in south-eastern France.

As with many smaller villages off the beaten track and closer to the coast, the village perché of Fox-Amphoux lives a quiet life. The old church tower behind the town square offers a 360° panorama of the surrounding countryside including a view of Mont Sainte Victoire to the west. The former hotel in the centre of the village offers bed and breakfast ('chambres d'hôtes').

== Notable residents ==
Paul Barras, president of the Directory and a major figure of the French Revolution, was born in Fox-Amphoux in 1755. Christer Strömholm (1918–2002) a Swedish photographer, recipient of the 1997 Hasselblad Award, had a house here. The artist René Lacroix (1948–2011) originally from Nice, moved to Fox-Amphoux in 2004 and had his atelier/gallery in the far end of the village; his works have been exhibited in France and also abroad.

== Trees ==
A huge nettle tree, or 'micocoulier', Celtis australis, planted in 1550, stands immediately in front of the church. In front of the nettle tree is an old field elm, Ulmus minor (73 cm d.b.h.), which has (<2017) escaped Dutch elm disease.

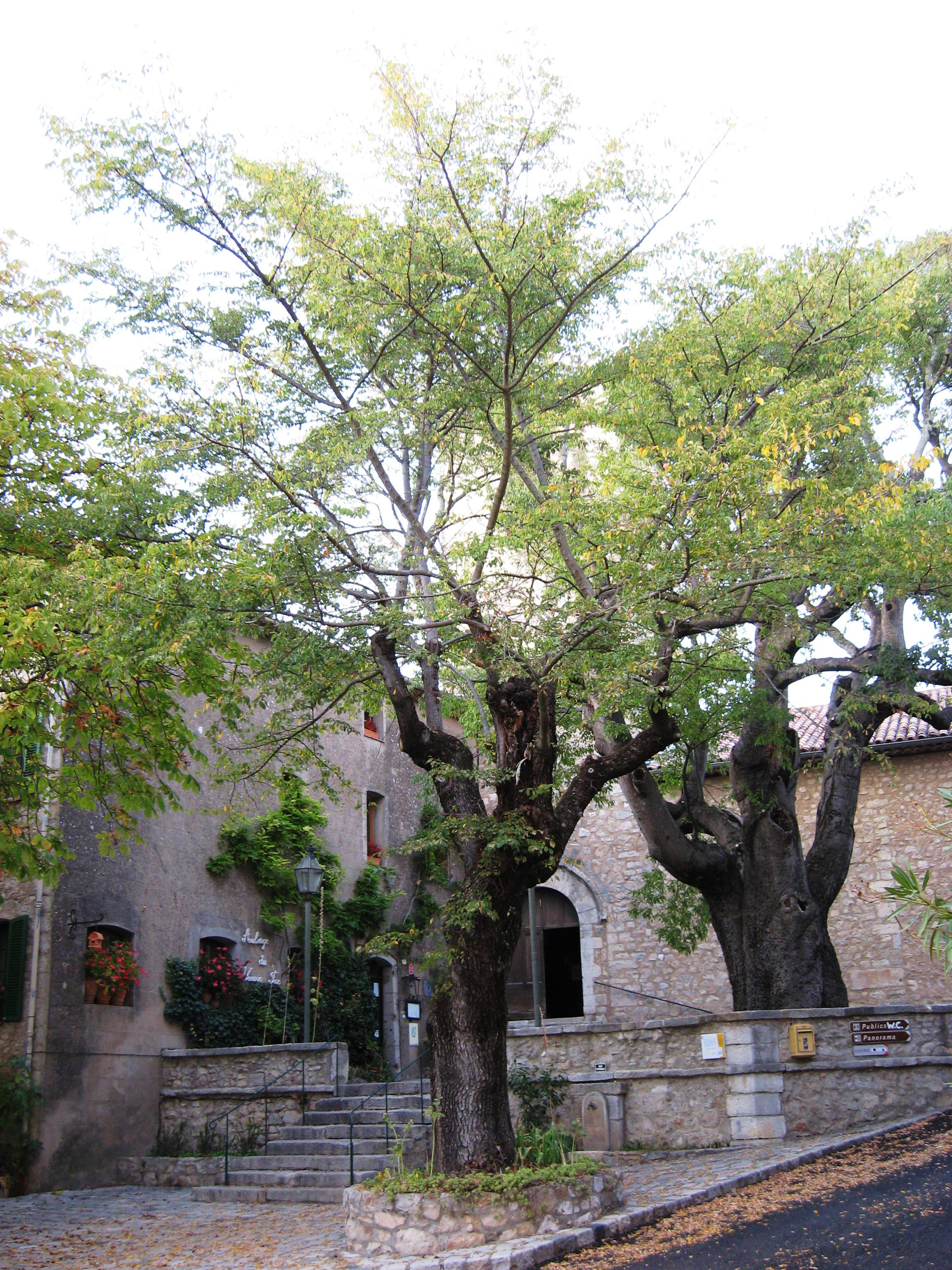
Elm (left) and nettle tree in front of the church at Fox-Amphoux

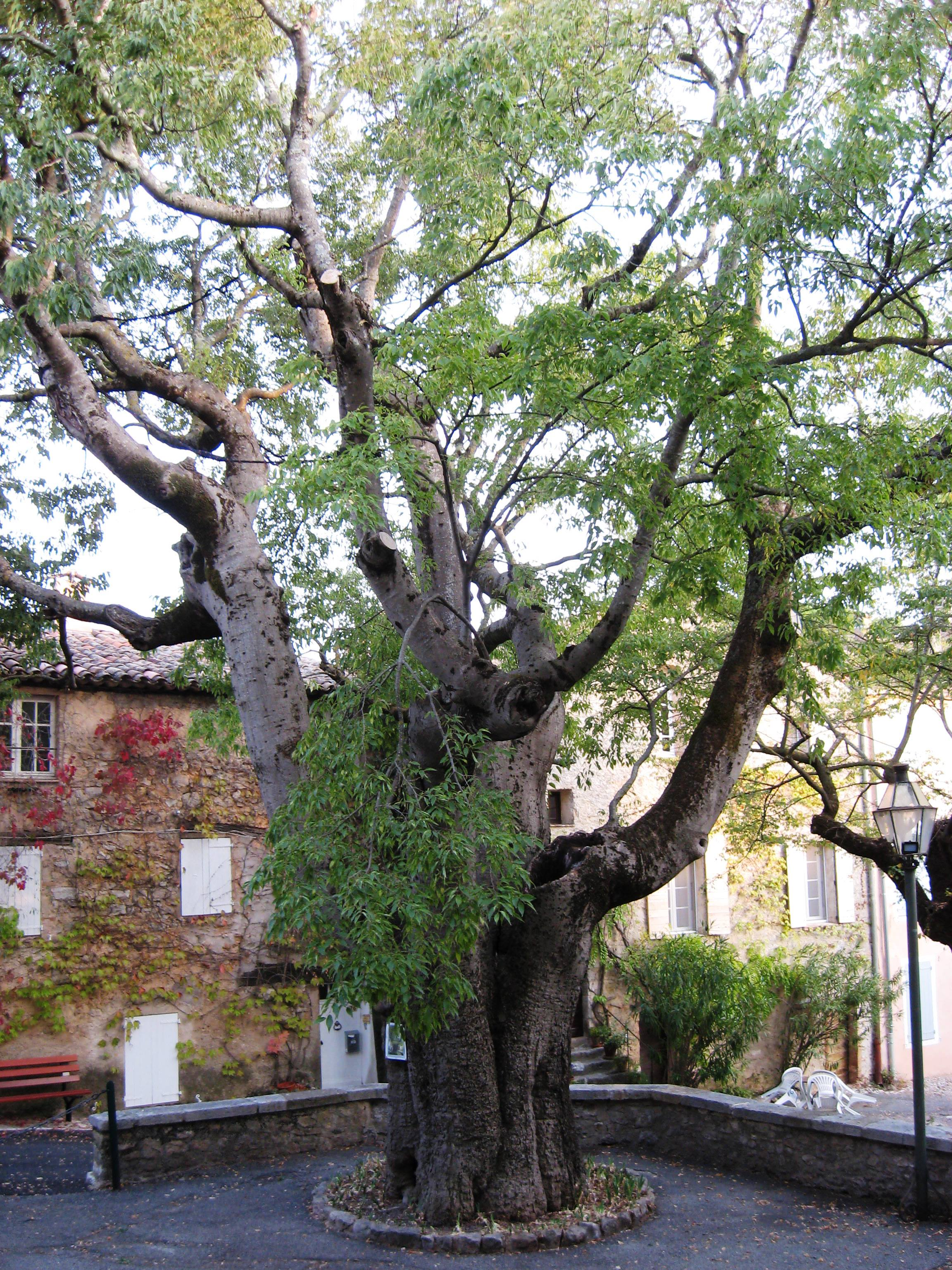
Nettle tree at Fox-Amphoux

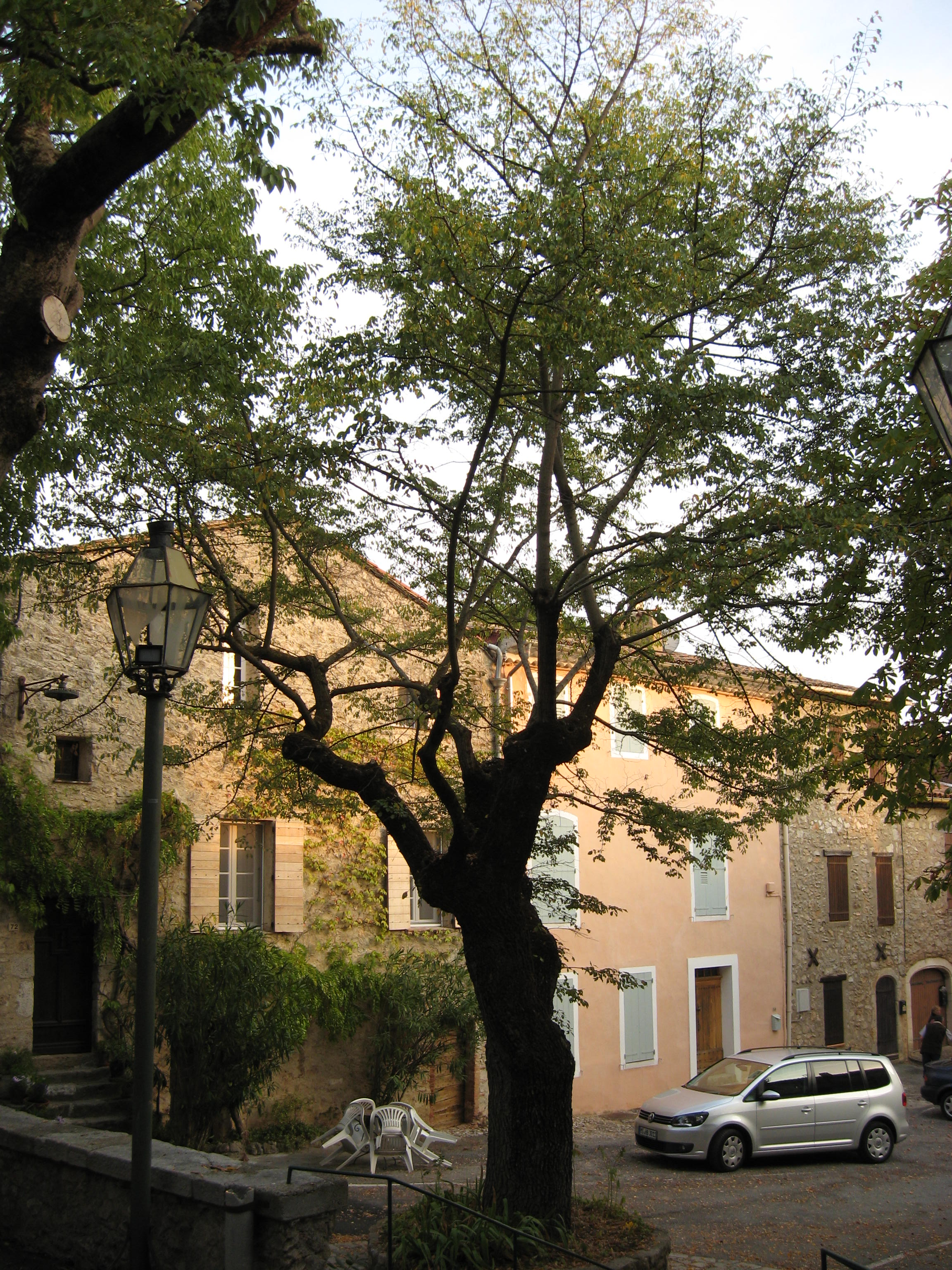
Elm in centre of Fox-Amphoux

== See also ==
- Communes of the Var department
