= Bargème =

- Commune
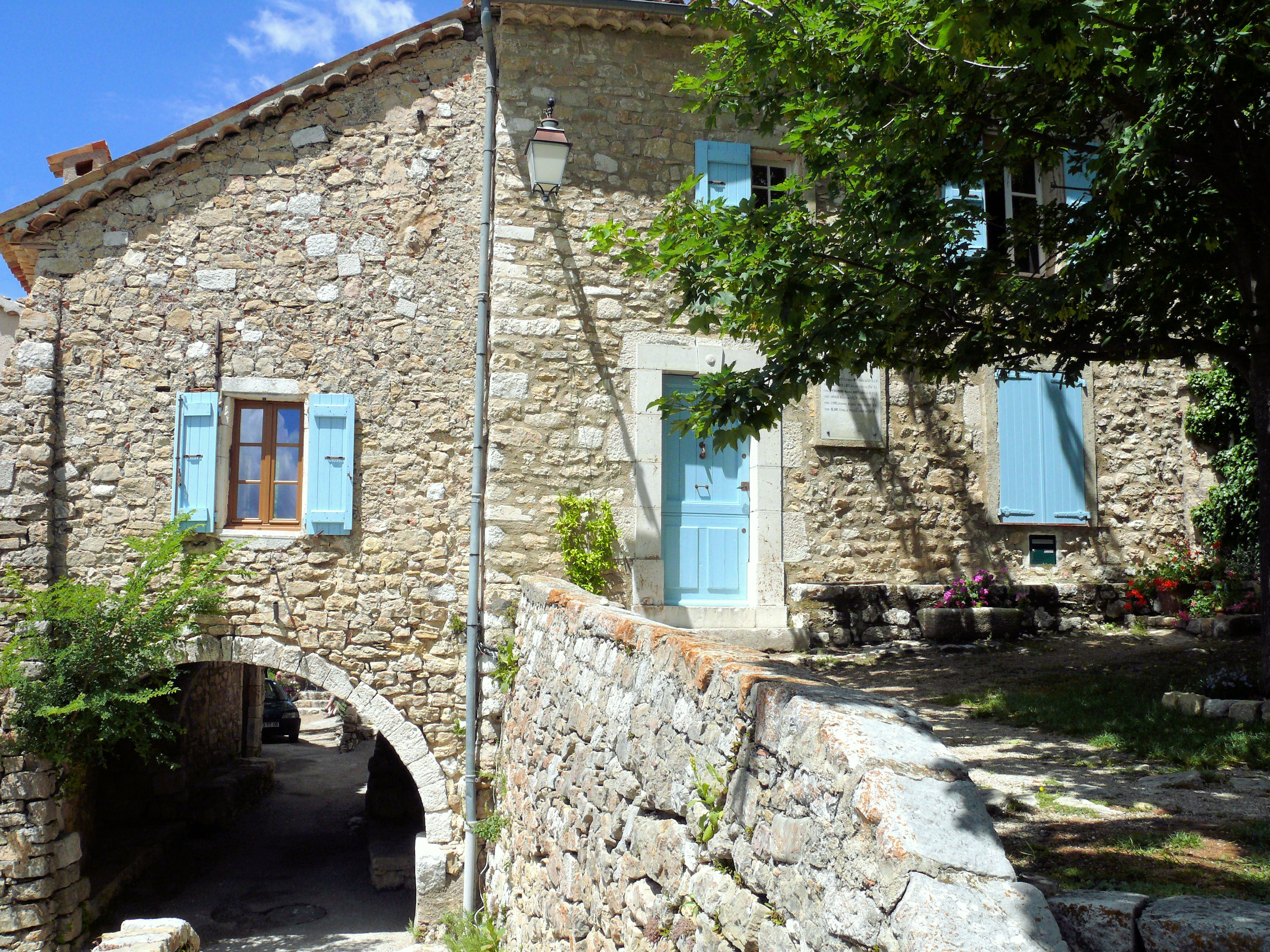
- The town hall of Bargème

- Coat of arms
- Location of Bargème
- Location within France Location within Provence-Alpes-Côte d'Azur
- Coordinates: 43°43′51″N 6°34′25″E
- Country: France
- Region: Provence-Alpes-Côte d'Azur
- Department: Var
- Arrondissement: Draguignan
- Canton: Flayosc
- Intercommunality: CA Dracénie Provence Verdon

Government
  - Mayor (2020–2026): Jacques Gérard
- Area^{1}: 27.95 km^{2} (10.79 sq mi)
- Highest elevation: 1,589 m (5,213 ft)
- Lowest elevation: 824 m (2,703 ft)
- Population (2023): 207
  - Density: 7.41/km^{2} (19.2/sq mi)
- Time zone: UTC+01:00 (CET)
  - Summer (DST): UTC+02:00 (CEST)
- INSEE/Postal code: 83010 /83840
- ^{1} French Land Register data, which excludes lakes, ponds, glaciers > 1 km^{2} (0.386 sq mi or 247 acres) and river estuaries.

Bargème (French pronunciation: [baʁʒɛm]; Occitan: Bargema) is a commune in the Var department in the Provence-Alpes-Côte d'Azur region in southeastern France. It is a member of Les Plus Beaux Villages de France (The Most Beautiful Villages of France) Association.

== See also ==
- Communes of the Var department

== History ==
In 1949 Evelyn Watts, an English social worker, with a friend set up a home in Bargème for disadvantaged children to recover their strength and confidence in a healthy climate. Her book Castle on a Hill describes the venture.
