= Solliès-Toucas =

- Commune
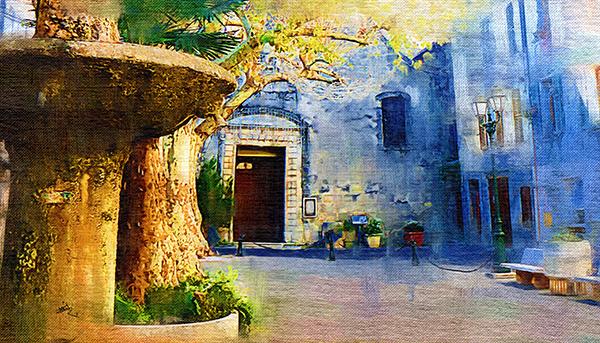
- The church square in Solliès-Toucas

- Coat of arms
- Location of Solliès-Toucas
- Location within France Location within Provence-Alpes-Côte d'Azur
- Coordinates: 43°12′23″N 6°01′33″E
- Country: France
- Region: Provence-Alpes-Côte d'Azur
- Department: Var
- Arrondissement: Toulon
- Canton: Solliès-Pont
- Intercommunality: Vallée du Gapeau

Government
  - Mayor (2020–2026): Jérémie Fabre
- Area^{1}: 30.09 km^{2} (11.62 sq mi)
- Elevation: 106 m (348 ft)
- Highest elevation: 783 m (2,569 ft)
- Lowest elevation: 84 m (276 ft)
- Population (2023): 6,269
  - Density: 208.3/km^{2} (539.6/sq mi)
- Time zone: UTC+01:00 (CET)
  - Summer (DST): UTC+02:00 (CEST)
- INSEE/Postal code: 83131 /83210
- ^{1} French Land Register data, which excludes lakes, ponds, glaciers > 1 km^{2} (0.386 sq mi or 247 acres) and river estuaries.

Solliès-Toucas (French pronunciation: [sɔljɛs tukas]; Occitan: Soliers-Tocàs) is a commune in the Var department in the Provence-Alpes-Côte d'Azur region in southeastern France.

== Population ==
Historical population
Year	Pop.	±% p.a.
1968	1,287	—
1975	1,549	+2.68%
1982	2,098	+4.43%
1990	3,439	+6.37%
1999	4,397	+2.77%
2007	4,983	+1.58%
2012	5,375	+1.53%
2017	5,719	+1.25%
2023	6,269	+1.54%
Source: INSEE

== See also ==
- Communes of the Var department
