= Baudinard-sur-Verdon =

Baudinard-sur-Verdon Bèudiran (Occitan)
- Commune
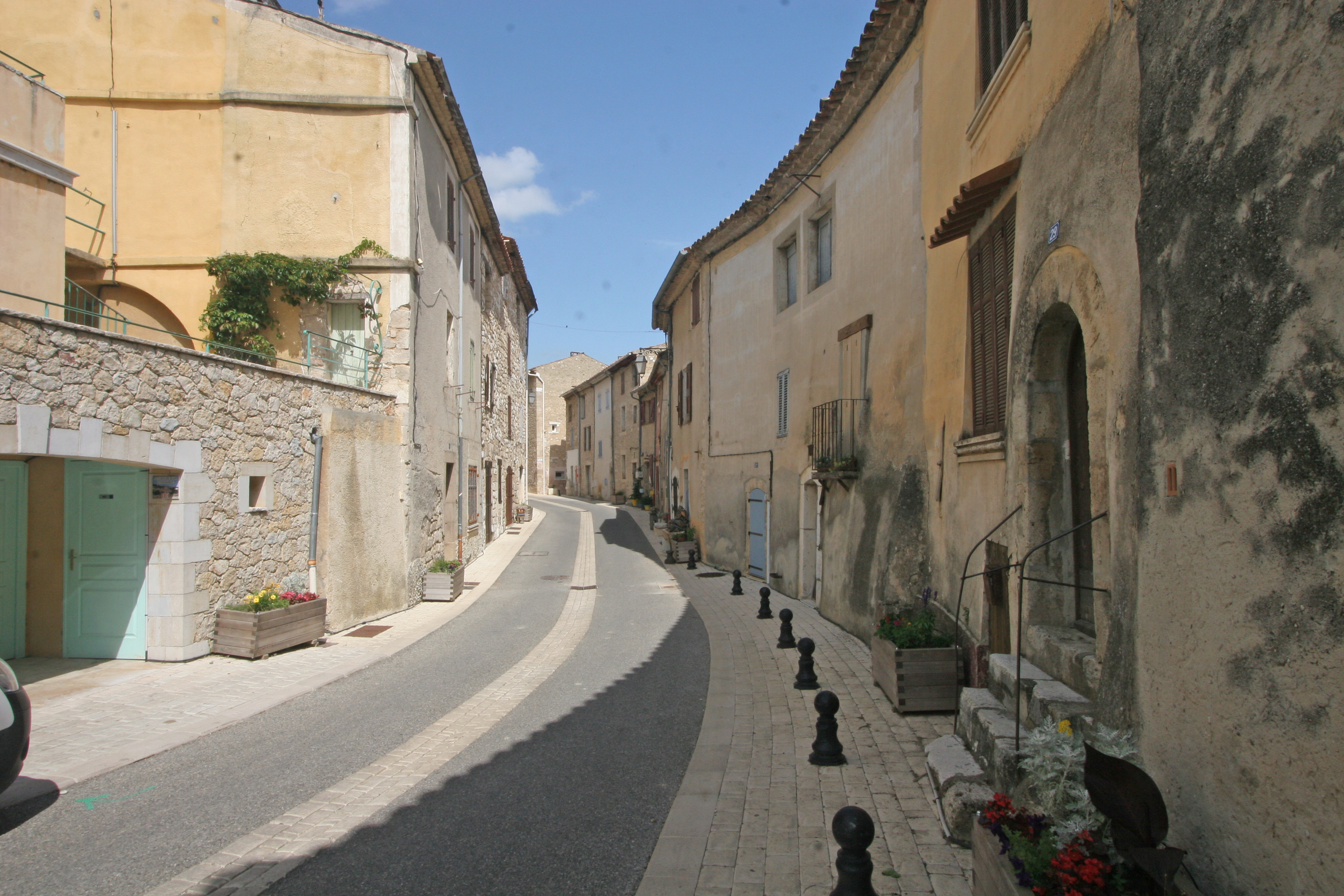
- The village of Baudinard-sur-Verdon

- Coat of arms
- Location of Baudinard-sur-Verdon
- Location within France Location within Provence-Alpes-Côte d'Azur
- Coordinates: 43°43′02″N 6°08′05″E
- Country: France
- Region: Provence-Alpes-Côte d'Azur
- Department: Var
- Arrondissement: Brignoles
- Canton: Flayosc

Government
  - Mayor (2021–2026): Joannel Anglionin
- Area^{1}: 21.97 km^{2} (8.48 sq mi)
- Elevation: 650 m (2,130 ft)
- Highest elevation: 785 m (2,575 ft)
- Lowest elevation: 399 m (1,309 ft)
- Population (2023): 235
  - Density: 10.7/km^{2} (27.7/sq mi)
- Time zone: UTC+01:00 (CET)
  - Summer (DST): UTC+02:00 (CEST)
- INSEE/Postal code: 83014 /83630
- ^{1} French Land Register data, which excludes lakes, ponds, glaciers > 1 km^{2} (0.386 sq mi or 247 acres) and river estuaries.

Baudinard-sur-Verdon (French pronunciation: [bodinaʁ syʁ vɛʁdɔ̃], lit. "Baudinard-on-Verdon"; Occitan: Bèudiran), often simply referred to as Baudinard, is a commune in the Var department in the Provence-Alpes-Côte d'Azur region in Southeastern France. As of 2023, the population of the commune was 235. Baudinard-sur-Verdon is located on the departmental border with Alpes-de-Haute-Provence to the northwest, on the left bank of the river Verdon that marks part of it.

It is on the Lake of Sainte-Croix, south of the Sainte-Croix Dam. The commune is known for its Gorges de Baudinard on the Verdon, as well as the Prieuré de Valmogne outside the village.

== See also ==
- Communes of the Var department
