= Moissac-Bellevue =

- Commune
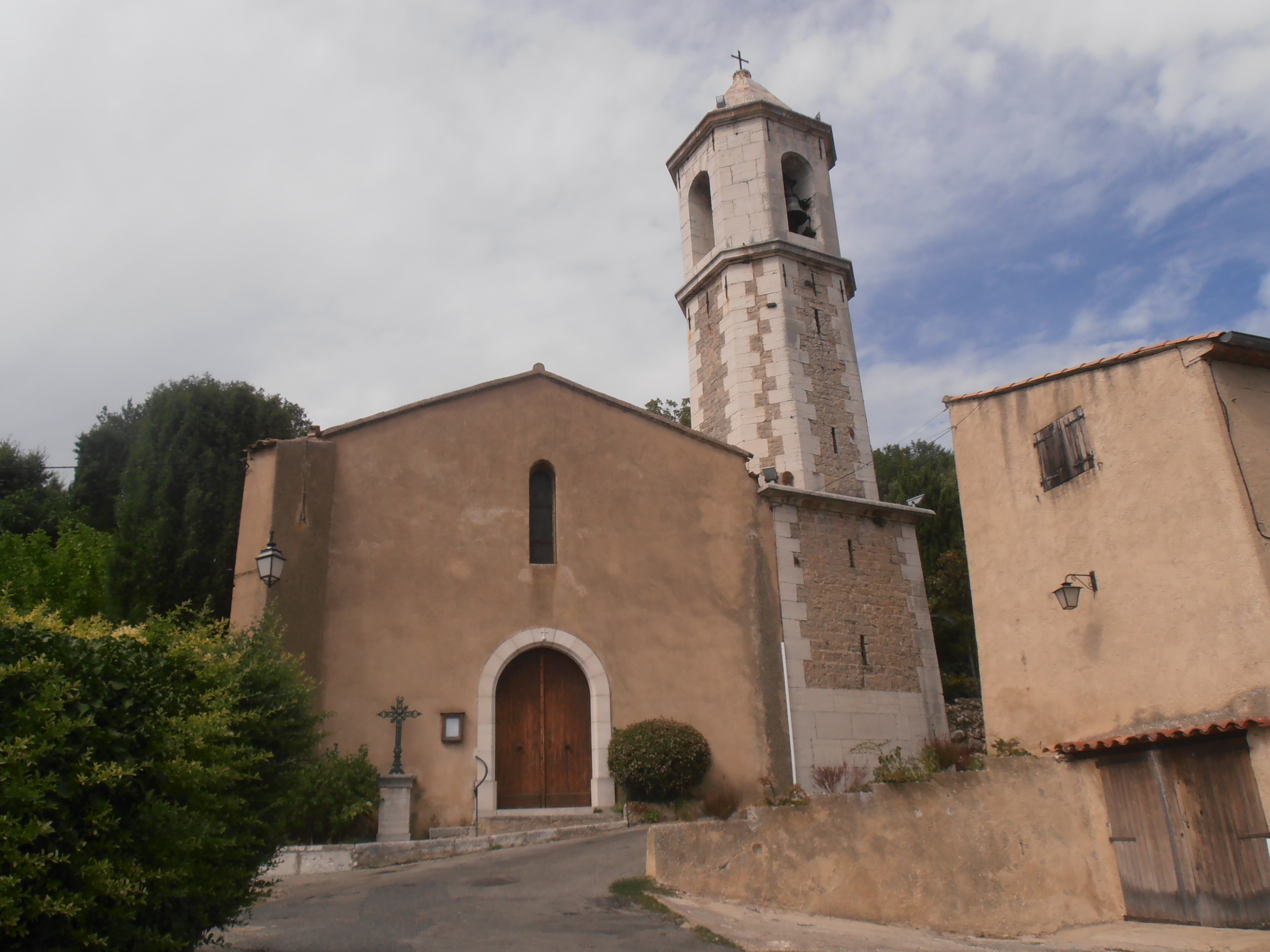
- The church and belfry, in Moissac-Bellevue

- Coat of arms
- Location of Moissac-Bellevue
- Location within France Location within Provence-Alpes-Côte d'Azur
- Coordinates: 43°39′13″N 6°10′02″E
- Country: France
- Region: Provence-Alpes-Côte d'Azur
- Department: Var
- Arrondissement: Brignoles
- Canton: Flayosc

Government
  - Mayor (2020–2026): Gilbert Riboulet
- Area^{1}: 20.59 km^{2} (7.95 sq mi)
- Elevation: 579 m (1,900 ft)
- Highest elevation: 982 m (3,222 ft)
- Lowest elevation: 430 m (1,410 ft)
- Population (2023): 306
  - Density: 14.9/km^{2} (38.5/sq mi)
- Time zone: UTC+01:00 (CET)
  - Summer (DST): UTC+02:00 (CEST)
- INSEE/Postal code: 83078 /83630
- ^{1} French Land Register data, which excludes lakes, ponds, glaciers > 1 km^{2} (0.386 sq mi or 247 acres) and river estuaries.

Moissac-Bellevue (French pronunciation: [mwasak bɛlvy]; Occitan: Moissac) is a commune in the Var department in the Provence-Alpes-Côte d'Azur region in southeastern France.

== See also ==
- Communes of the Var department
