= La Farlède =

- Commune
- Coat of arms
- Location of La Farlède
- Location within France Location within Provence-Alpes-Côte d'Azur
- Coordinates: 43°10′07″N 6°02′37″E
- Country: France
- Region: Provence-Alpes-Côte d'Azur
- Department: Var
- Arrondissement: Toulon
- Canton: Solliès-Pont
- Intercommunality: Vallée du Gapeau

Government
  - Mayor (2021–2026): Yves Palmieri
- Area^{1}: 8.31 km^{2} (3.21 sq mi)
- Elevation: 79 m (259 ft)
- Highest elevation: 640 m (2,100 ft)
- Lowest elevation: 41 m (135 ft)
- Population (2023): 10,014
  - Density: 1,210/km^{2} (3,120/sq mi)
- Time zone: UTC+01:00 (CET)
  - Summer (DST): UTC+02:00 (CEST)
- INSEE/Postal code: 83054 /83210
- ^{1} French Land Register data, which excludes lakes, ponds, glaciers > 1 km^{2} (0.386 sq mi or 247 acres) and river estuaries.

La Farlède (French pronunciation: [la faʁlɛd]; Occitan: La Farleta) is a commune in the Var department in the Provence-Alpes-Côte d'Azur region in southeastern France.

== Population ==
Historical population
Year	Pop.	±% p.a.
1968	2,540	—
1975	3,027	+2.54%
1982	4,472	+5.73%
1990	6,491	+4.77%
1999	6,877	+0.64%
2007	7,851	+1.67%
2012	8,682	+2.03%
2017	9,083	+0.91%
2023	10,014	+1.64%
Source: INSEE

== See also ==
- Communes of the Var department
