= Châteauvieux, Var =

Châteauvieux Castèuvièlh (Occitan)
- Commune
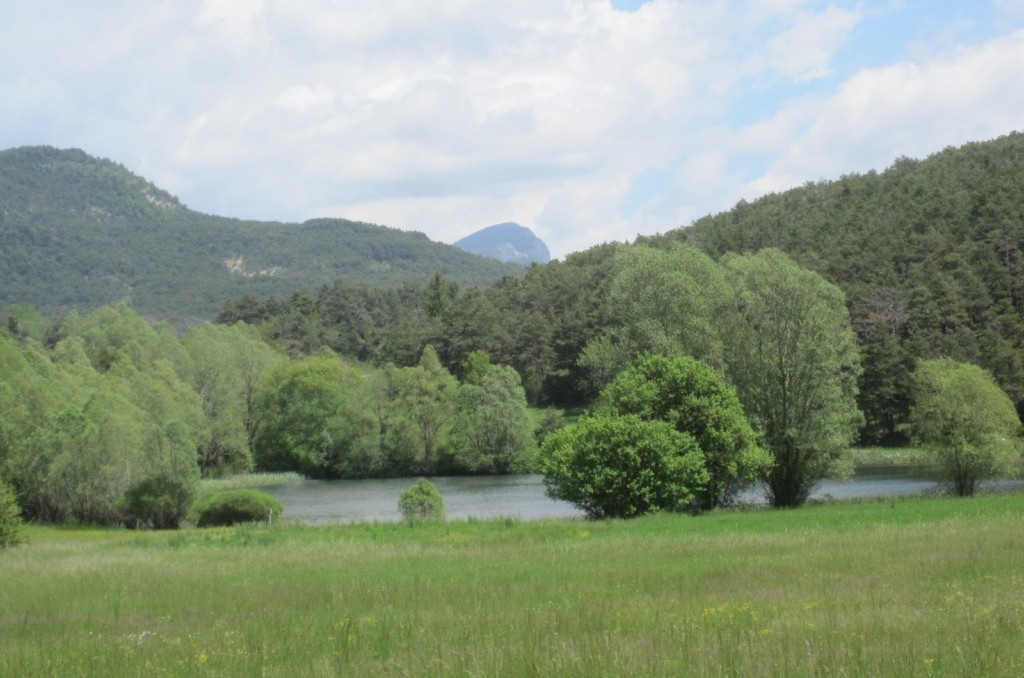
- The Vallon de Font Freye in Châteauvieux

- Coat of arms
- Location of Châteauvieux
- Location within France Location within Provence-Alpes-Côte d'Azur
- Coordinates: 43°46′41″N 6°34′44″E
- Country: France
- Region: Provence-Alpes-Côte d'Azur
- Department: Var
- Arrondissement: Draguignan
- Canton: Flayosc

Government
  - Mayor (2020–2026): Nans Bellini
- Area^{1}: 14.97 km^{2} (5.78 sq mi)
- Elevation: 1,050 m (3,440 ft)
- Highest elevation: 1,271 m (4,170 ft)
- Lowest elevation: 843 m (2,766 ft)
- Population (2023): 78
  - Density: 5.2/km^{2} (13/sq mi)
- Time zone: UTC+01:00 (CET)
  - Summer (DST): UTC+02:00 (CEST)
- INSEE/Postal code: 83040 /83840
- ^{1} French Land Register data, which excludes lakes, ponds, glaciers > 1 km^{2} (0.386 sq mi or 247 acres) and river estuaries.

Châteauvieux (French: [ʃɑtovjø]; Occitan: Castèuvièlh) is a commune in the Var département in the Provence-Alpes-Côte d'Azur region, southeastern France. It is located in the Vallon des Bous, on the D52 road, 17 km south east of Castellane.

== See also ==
- Communes of the Var department
