= Comps-sur-Artuby =

- Commune
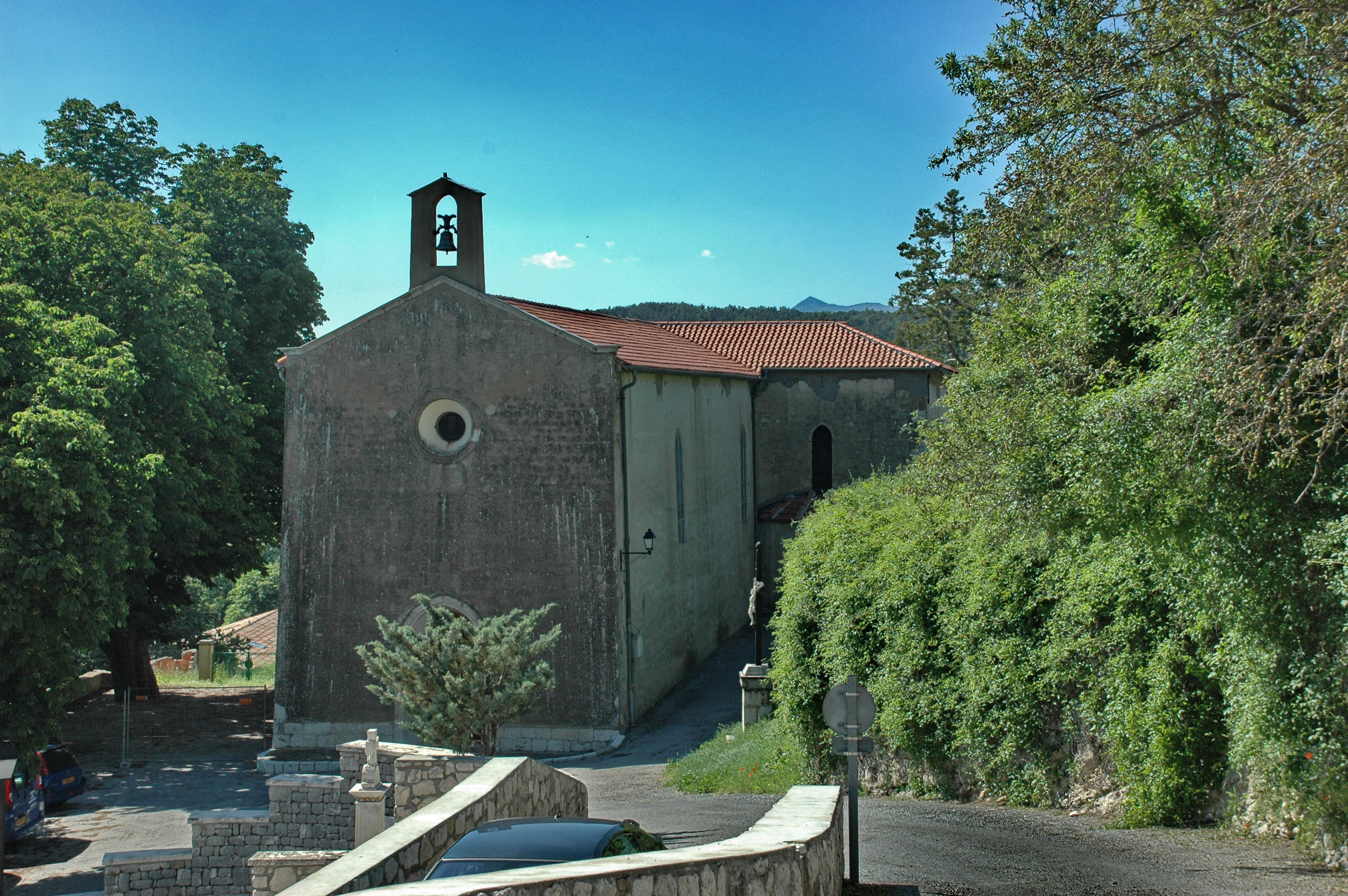
- Sainte Philomène Church

- Coat of arms
- Location of Comps-sur-Artuby
- Location within France Location within Provence-Alpes-Côte d'Azur
- Coordinates: 43°42′39″N 6°30′34″E
- Country: France
- Region: Provence-Alpes-Côte d'Azur
- Department: Var
- Arrondissement: Draguignan
- Canton: Flayosc
- Intercommunality: CA Dracénie Provence Verdon

Government
  - Mayor (2020–2026): Alain Barale
- Area^{1}: 63.49 km^{2} (24.51 sq mi)
- Elevation: 900 m (3,000 ft)
- Highest elevation: 1,178 m (3,865 ft)
- Lowest elevation: 736 m (2,415 ft)
- Population (2023): 339
  - Density: 5.34/km^{2} (13.8/sq mi)
- Time zone: UTC+01:00 (CET)
  - Summer (DST): UTC+02:00 (CEST)
- INSEE/Postal code: 83044 /83840
- ^{1} French Land Register data, which excludes lakes, ponds, glaciers > 1 km^{2} (0.386 sq mi or 247 acres) and river estuaries.

Comps-sur-Artuby (French pronunciation: [kɔ̃ps syʁ aʁtybi], literally Comps on Artuby; Occitan: Comps d'Artubi) is a commune in the Var department in the Provence-Alpes-Côte d'Azur region in southeastern France.

It is the nearest town to the eastern entrance to the Gorges du Verdon.

== Geography ==
=== Climate ===
Comps-sur-Artuby has a warm-summer Mediterranean climate (Köppen climate classification Csb). The average annual temperature in Comps-sur-Artuby is 11.3 °C (52.3 °F). The average annual rainfall is 1,010.2 mm (39.77 in) with November as the wettest month. The temperatures are highest on average in July, at around 20.3 °C (68.5 °F), and lowest in January, at around 3.8 °C (38.8 °F). The highest temperature ever recorded in Comps-sur-Artuby was 38.1 °C (100.6 °F) on 7 July 1982; the coldest temperature ever recorded was −19.2 °C (−2.6 °F) on 23 January 1963.

Climate data for Comps-sur-Artuby (1991−2020 normals, extremes 1952−present)
| Month | Jan | Feb | Mar | Apr | May | Jun | Jul | Aug | Sep | Oct | Nov | Dec | Year |
|---|---|---|---|---|---|---|---|---|---|---|---|---|---|
| Record high °C (°F) | 22.9 (73.2) | 21.3 (70.3) | 23.7 (74.7) | 26.2 (79.2) | 30.9 (87.6) | 37.2 (99.0) | 38.1 (100.6) | 36.4 (97.5) | 32.2 (90.0) | 30.6 (87.1) | 24.9 (76.8) | 21.2 (70.2) | 38.1 (100.6) |
| Mean daily maximum °C (°F) | 8.4 (47.1) | 9.3 (48.7) | 12.2 (54.0) | 15.0 (59.0) | 19.1 (66.4) | 23.7 (74.7) | 26.8 (80.2) | 27.0 (80.6) | 21.9 (71.4) | 17.1 (62.8) | 11.6 (52.9) | 9.0 (48.2) | 16.8 (62.2) |
| Daily mean °C (°F) | 3.8 (38.8) | 4.1 (39.4) | 6.8 (44.2) | 9.6 (49.3) | 13.6 (56.5) | 17.7 (63.9) | 20.3 (68.5) | 20.3 (68.5) | 16.0 (60.8) | 12.0 (53.6) | 7.0 (44.6) | 4.5 (40.1) | 11.3 (52.3) |
| Mean daily minimum °C (°F) | −0.8 (30.6) | −1.1 (30.0) | 1.4 (34.5) | 4.3 (39.7) | 8.1 (46.6) | 11.7 (53.1) | 13.7 (56.7) | 13.5 (56.3) | 10.1 (50.2) | 6.9 (44.4) | 2.5 (36.5) | 0.0 (32.0) | 5.9 (42.6) |
| Record low °C (°F) | −19.2 (−2.6) | −18.9 (−2.0) | −16.8 (1.8) | −7.5 (18.5) | −5.1 (22.8) | −3.2 (26.2) | 1.0 (33.8) | 1.4 (34.5) | −1.0 (30.2) | −5.4 (22.3) | −11.3 (11.7) | −16.0 (3.2) | −19.2 (−2.6) |
| Average precipitation mm (inches) | 71.8 (2.83) | 61.8 (2.43) | 74.5 (2.93) | 93.4 (3.68) | 89.5 (3.52) | 81.0 (3.19) | 28.5 (1.12) | 43.0 (1.69) | 72.1 (2.84) | 126.1 (4.96) | 166.8 (6.57) | 101.7 (4.00) | 1,010.2 (39.77) |
| Average precipitation days (≥ 1.0 mm) | 6.4 | 6.5 | 6.7 | 8.7 | 7.9 | 5.3 | 3.6 | 4.1 | 5.3 | 7.0 | 9.0 | 6.8 | 77.2 |
Source: Météo-France

== See also ==
- Communes of the Var department
