= Villecroze =

- Commune
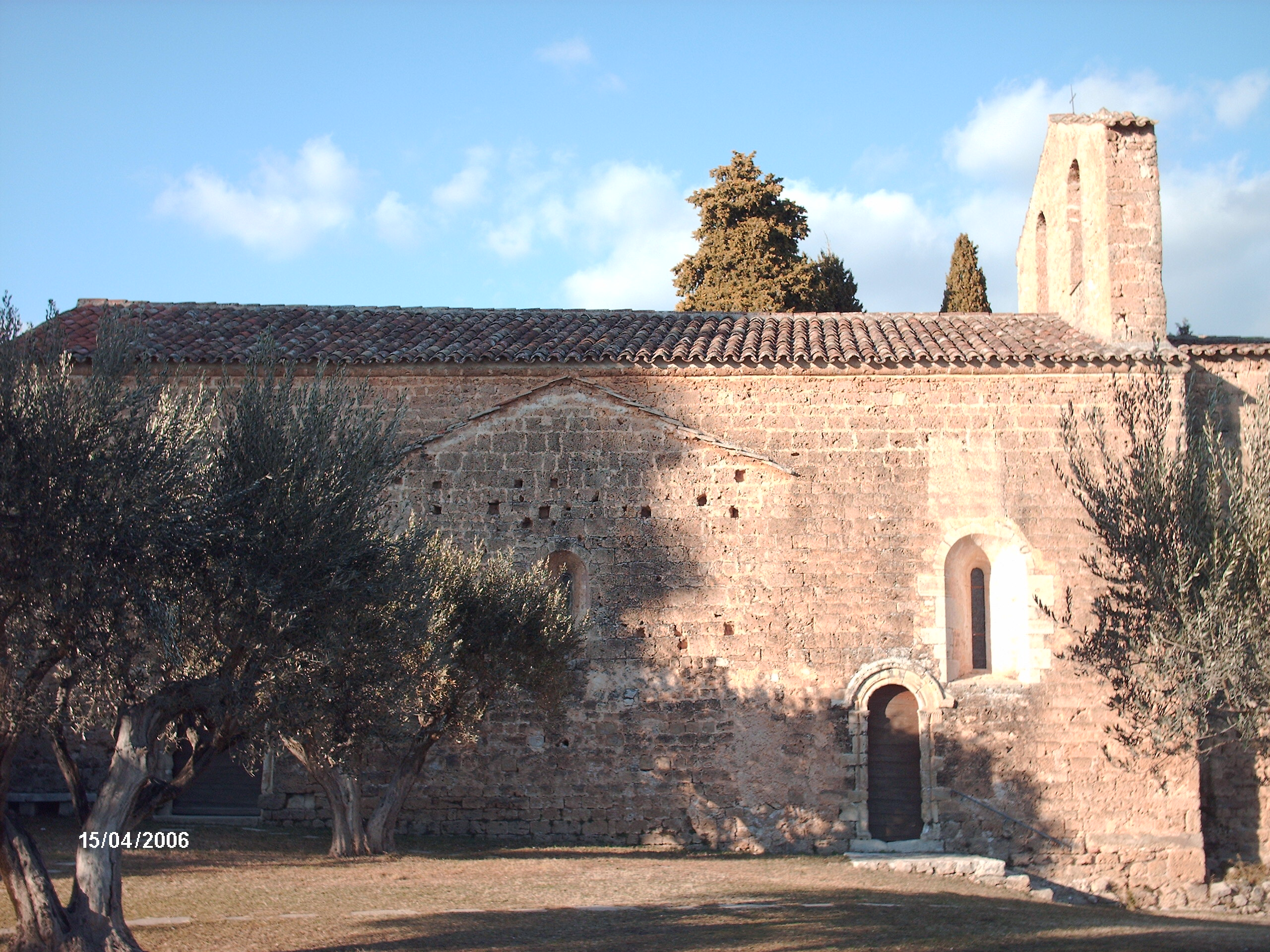
- The chapel of Saint Victor, in Villecroze

- Coat of arms
- Location of Villecroze
- Location within France Location within Provence-Alpes-Côte d'Azur
- Coordinates: 43°34′59″N 6°16′38″E
- Country: France
- Region: Provence-Alpes-Côte d'Azur
- Department: Var
- Arrondissement: Brignoles
- Canton: Flayosc

Government
  - Mayor (2020–2026): Rolland Balbis
- Area^{1}: 20.6 km^{2} (8.0 sq mi)
- Elevation: 350 m (1,150 ft)
- Highest elevation: 520 m (1,710 ft)
- Lowest elevation: 229 m (751 ft)
- Population (2023): 1,514
  - Density: 73.5/km^{2} (190/sq mi)
- Time zone: UTC+01:00 (CET)
  - Summer (DST): UTC+02:00 (CEST)
- INSEE/Postal code: 83149 /83690
- ^{1} French Land Register data, which excludes lakes, ponds, glaciers > 1 km^{2} (0.386 sq mi or 247 acres) and river estuaries.

Villecroze (French pronunciation: [vil.kʁɔz]; Occitan: Vilacròsa) is a commune in the Var department in the Provence-Alpes-Côte d'Azur region in southeastern France.

== See also ==
- Communes of the Var department
