= Régusse =

- Commune
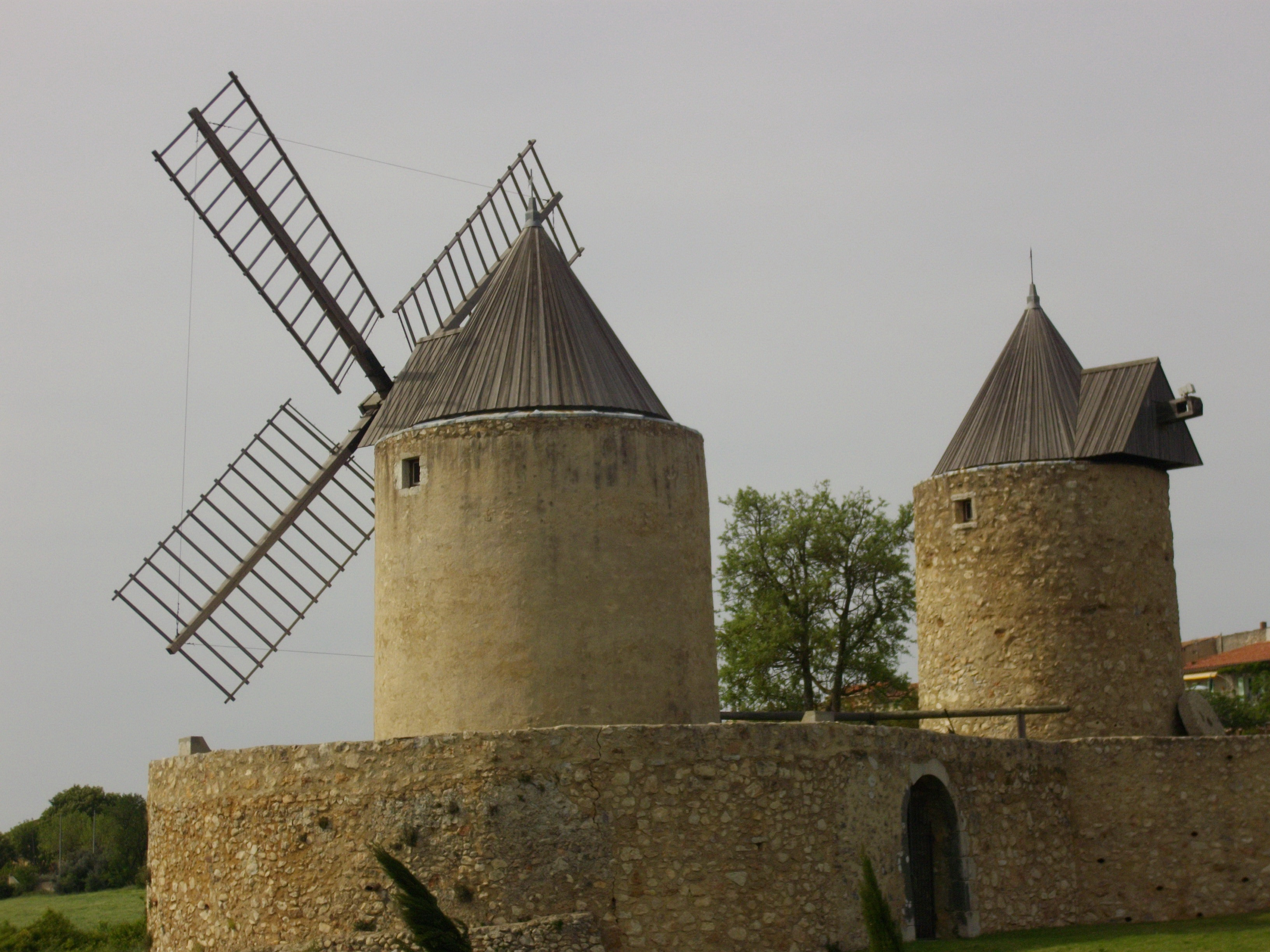
- Windmills in Régusse

- Coat of arms
- Location of Régusse
- Location within France Location within Provence-Alpes-Côte d'Azur
- Coordinates: 43°39′00″N 6°08′00″E
- Country: France
- Region: Provence-Alpes-Côte d'Azur
- Department: Var
- Arrondissement: Brignoles
- Canton: Flayosc

Government
  - Mayor (2020–2026): Renée Jeanneret
- Area^{1}: 35.30 km^{2} (13.63 sq mi)
- Elevation: 576 m (1,890 ft)
- Highest elevation: 932 m (3,058 ft)
- Lowest elevation: 360 m (1,180 ft)
- Population (2023): 2,380
  - Density: 67.4/km^{2} (175/sq mi)
- Time zone: UTC+01:00 (CET)
  - Summer (DST): UTC+02:00 (CEST)
- INSEE/Postal code: 83102 /83630
- ^{1} French Land Register data, which excludes lakes, ponds, glaciers > 1 km^{2} (0.386 sq mi or 247 acres) and river estuaries.

Régusse (French pronunciation: [ʁeɡys]; Occitan: Regussa) is a commune in the Var department in the Provence-Alpes-Côte d'Azur region in southeastern France.

== Geography ==
=== Climate ===
Régusse has a hot-summer Mediterranean climate (Köppen climate classification Csa). The average annual temperature in Régusse is 13.5 °C (56.3 °F). The average annual rainfall is 717.9 mm (28.26 in) with November as the wettest month. The temperatures are highest on average in July, at around 22.8 °C (73.0 °F), and lowest in January, at around 5.5 °C (41.9 °F). The highest temperature ever recorded in Régusse was 40.9 °C (105.6 °F) on 28 June 2019; the coldest temperature ever recorded was −10.3 °C (13.5 °F) on 13 February 2012.

Climate data for Régusse (1991−2020 normals, extremes 1997−present)
Month	Jan	Feb	Mar	Apr	May	Jun	Jul	Aug	Sep	Oct	Nov	Dec	Year
Record high °C (°F)	22.9 (73.2)	22.4 (72.3)	26.2 (79.2)	27.8 (82.0)	32.2 (90.0)	40.9 (105.6)	37.5 (99.5)	38.6 (101.5)	33.1 (91.6)	31.2 (88.2)	21.4 (70.5)	21.4 (70.5)	40.9 (105.6)
Mean daily maximum °C (°F)	9.8 (49.6)	11.2 (52.2)	14.6 (58.3)	17.7 (63.9)	21.9 (71.4)	27.0 (80.6)	30.2 (86.4)	29.9 (85.8)	24.8 (76.6)	19.3 (66.7)	13.4 (56.1)	10.2 (50.4)	19.2 (66.6)
Daily mean °C (°F)	5.5 (41.9)	6.1 (43.0)	9.1 (48.4)	12.0 (53.6)	15.9 (60.6)	20.2 (68.4)	22.8 (73.0)	22.7 (72.9)	18.5 (65.3)	14.3 (57.7)	9.1 (48.4)	6.1 (43.0)	13.5 (56.3)
Mean daily minimum °C (°F)	1.3 (34.3)	1.1 (34.0)	3.5 (38.3)	6.4 (43.5)	9.8 (49.6)	13.4 (56.1)	15.4 (59.7)	15.4 (59.7)	12.3 (54.1)	9.2 (48.6)	4.8 (40.6)	2.0 (35.6)	7.9 (46.2)
Record low °C (°F)	−8.5 (16.7)	−10.3 (13.5)	−6.4 (20.5)	−3.0 (26.6)	1.1 (34.0)	5.1 (41.2)	8.2 (46.8)	8.8 (47.8)	3.2 (37.8)	−1.6 (29.1)	−5.5 (22.1)	−9.1 (15.6)	−10.3 (13.5)
Average precipitation mm (inches)	46.9 (1.85)	43.6 (1.72)	43.5 (1.71)	65.5 (2.58)	73.6 (2.90)	49.4 (1.94)	23.3 (0.92)	42.1 (1.66)	59.9 (2.36)	90.7 (3.57)	112.6 (4.43)	66.8 (2.63)	717.9 (28.26)
Average precipitation days (≥ 1.0 mm)	5.5	5.1	5.6	7.4	7.3	4.4	2.8	3.8	4.8	6.5	8.1	6.0	67.3
Source: Météo-France

== Population ==
Historical population
Year	Pop.	±% p.a.
1968	272	—
1975	326	+2.62%
1982	482	+5.75%
1990	820	+6.87%
1999	1,137	+3.70%
2007	1,792	+5.85%
2012	2,280	+4.93%
2017	2,613	+2.76%
2023	2,380	−1.54%
Source: INSEE

== See also ==
- Communes of the Var department
