= La Martre, Var =

La Martre
- Commune
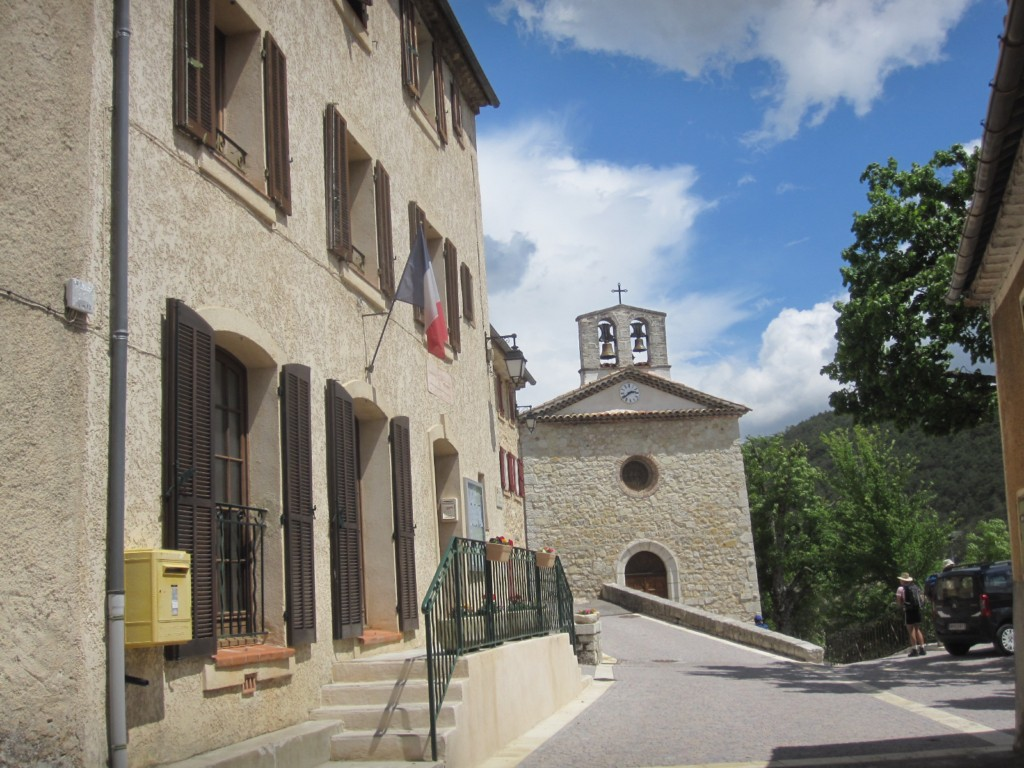
- The town hall and the church in La Martre

- Coat of arms
- Location of La Martre
- Location within France Location within Provence-Alpes-Côte d'Azur
- Coordinates: 43°46′20″N 6°35′56″E
- Country: France
- Region: Provence-Alpes-Côte d'Azur
- Department: Var
- Arrondissement: Draguignan
- Canton: Flayosc

Government
  - Mayor (2020–2026): Raymonde Carletti
- Area^{1}: 20.37 km^{2} (7.86 sq mi)
- Elevation: 997 m (3,271 ft)
- Highest elevation: 1,589 m (5,213 ft)
- Lowest elevation: 876 m (2,874 ft)
- Population (2023): 226
  - Density: 11.1/km^{2} (28.7/sq mi)
- Time zone: UTC+01:00 (CET)
  - Summer (DST): UTC+02:00 (CEST)
- INSEE/Postal code: 83074 /83840
- ^{1} French Land Register data, which excludes lakes, ponds, glaciers > 1 km^{2} (0.386 sq mi or 247 acres) and river estuaries.

La Martre (French pronunciation: [la maʁtʁ]; Occitan: La Martra) is a commune in the Var department in the Provence-Alpes-Côte d'Azur region in southeastern France.

== See also ==
- Communes of the Var department
