= Communes of the Var department =

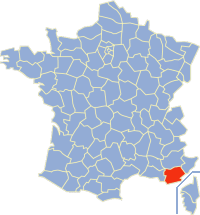

The following is a list of the 153 communes of the Var department of France.

The communes cooperate in the following intercommunalities (as of 2025):

- Métropole d'Aix-Marseille-Provence (partly)
- Métropole Toulon Provence Méditerranée
- Communauté d'agglomération Dracénie Provence Verdon
- CA Durance-Luberon-Verdon Agglomération (partly)
- CA Estérel Côte d'Azur Agglomération
- Communauté d'agglomération de la Provence Verte
- Communauté d'agglomération Sud Sainte Baume
- CC Cœur du Var
- Communauté de communes du golfe de Saint-Tropez
- Communauté de communes Lacs et Gorges du Verdon
- Communauté de communes Méditerranée Porte des Maures
- CC Pays de Fayence
- Communauté de communes Provence Verdon
- Communauté de communes de la Vallée du Gapeau

INSEE code	Postal code	Commune
83001	83600	Les Adrets-de-l'Estérel
83002	83630	Aiguines
83003	83111	Ampus
83004	83460	Les Arcs
83005	83630	Artignosc-sur-Verdon
83006	83560	Artigues
83007	83630	Aups
83008	83600	Bagnols-en-Forêt
83009	83150	Bandol
83010	83840	Bargème
83011	83830	Bargemon
83012	83670	Barjols
83013	83840	La Bastide
83014	83630	Baudinard-sur-Verdon
83015	83630	Bauduen
83016	83330	Le Beausset
83017	83210	Belgentier
83018	83890	Besse-sur-Issole
83019	83230	Bormes-les-Mimosas
83020	83840	Le Bourguet
83021	83149	Bras
83022	83840	Brenon
83023	83170	Brignoles
83025	83119	Brue-Auriac
83026	83340	Cabasse
83027	83740	La Cadière-d'Azur
83028	83830	Callas
83029	83440	Callian
83030	83170	Camps-la-Source
83031	83340	Le Cannet-des-Maures
83032	83570	Carcès
83033	83660	Carnoules
83034	83320	Carqueiranne
83035	83330	Le Castellet
83036	83240	Cavalaire-sur-Mer
83037	83170	La Celle
83038	83300	Châteaudouble
83039	83670	Châteauvert
83040	83840	Châteauvieux
83041	83830	Claviers
83042	83310	Cogolin
83043	83610	Collobrières
83044	83840	Comps-sur-Artuby
83045	83570	Correns
83046	83570	Cotignac
83047	83260	La Crau
83048	83420	La Croix-Valmer
83049	83390	Cuers
83050	83300	Draguignan
83051	83570	Entrecasteaux
83052	83560	Esparron-de-Pallières
83053	83330	Évenos
83054	83210	La Farlède
83055	83440	Fayence
83056	83830	Figanières
83057	83340	Flassans-sur-Issole
83058	83780	Flayosc
83059	83136	Forcalqueiret
83060	83670	Fox-Amphoux
83061	83600	Fréjus
83062	83130	La Garde
83063	83680	La Garde-Freinet
83064	83136	Garéoult
83065	83580	Gassin
83066	83560	Ginasservis
83067	83590	Gonfaron
83068	83310	Grimaud
83069	83400	Hyères
83070	83980	Le Lavandou
83071	83250	La Londe-les-Maures
83072	83510	Lorgues
83073	83340	Le Luc
83074	83840	La Martre
83075	83340	Les Mayons
83076	83136	Mazaugues

INSEE code	Postal code	Commune
83077	83136	Méounes-lès-Montrieux
83078	83630	Moissac-Bellevue
83079	83310	La Môle
83080	83440	Mons
83081	83440	Montauroux
83082	83131	Montferrat
83083	83570	Montfort-sur-Argens
83084	83670	Montmeyan
83085	83920	La Motte
83086	83490	Le Muy
83087	83860	Nans-les-Pins
83088	83136	Néoules
83089	83470	Ollières
83090	83190	Ollioules
83091	83390	Pierrefeu-du-Var
83092	83790	Pignans
83093	83640	Plan-d'Aups-Sainte-Baume
83094	83120	Le Plan-de-la-Tour
83095	83670	Pontevès
83096	83470	Pourcieux
83097	83910	Pourrières
83098	83220	Le Pradet
83099	83480	Puget-sur-Argens
83100	83390	Puget-Ville
83101	83350	Ramatuelle
83152	83820	Rayol-Canadel-sur-Mer
83102	83630	Régusse
83103	83200	Le Revest-les-Eaux
83104	83560	Rians
83105	13780	Riboux
83106	83136	Rocbaron
83107	83520	Roquebrune-sur-Argens
83108	83136	La Roquebrussanne
83109	83840	La Roque-Esclapon
83110	83170	Rougiers
83154	83510	Saint-Antonin-du-Var
83112	83270	Saint-Cyr-sur-Mer
83111	83136	Sainte-Anastasie-sur-Issole
83115	83120	Sainte-Maxime
83113	83560	Saint-Julien
83153	83430	Saint-Mandrier-sur-Mer
83114	83560	Saint-Martin-de-Pallières
83116	83470	Saint-Maximin-la-Sainte-Baume
83117	83440	Saint-Paul-en-Forêt
83118	83700	Saint-Raphaël
83119	83990	Saint-Tropez
83120	83640	Saint-Zacharie
83121	83690	Salernes
83122	83630	Les Salles-sur-Verdon
83123	83110	Sanary-sur-Mer
83124	83440	Seillans
83125	83470	Seillons-Source-d'Argens
83126	83500	La Seyne-sur-Mer
83127	83870	Signes
83128	83690	Sillans-la-Cascade
83129	83140	Six-Fours-les-Plages
83130	83210	Solliès-Pont
83131	83210	Solliès-Toucas
83132	83210	Solliès-Ville
83133	83440	Tanneron
83134	83460	Taradeau
83135	83670	Tavernes
83136	83340	Le Thoronet
83137	83000	Toulon
83138	83440	Tourrettes
83139	83690	Tourtour
83140	83170	Tourves
83141	83720	Trans-en-Provence
83142	83840	Trigance
83143	83143	Le Val
83144	83160	La Valette-du-Var
83145	83670	Varages
83146	83560	La Verdière
83147	83630	Vérignon
83148	83550	Vidauban
83149	83690	Villecroze
83150	83560	Vinon-sur-Verdon
83151	83170	Vins-sur-Caramy
