= Artignosc-sur-Verdon =

Artignosc-sur-Verdon Artinhòsc (Occitan)
- Commune
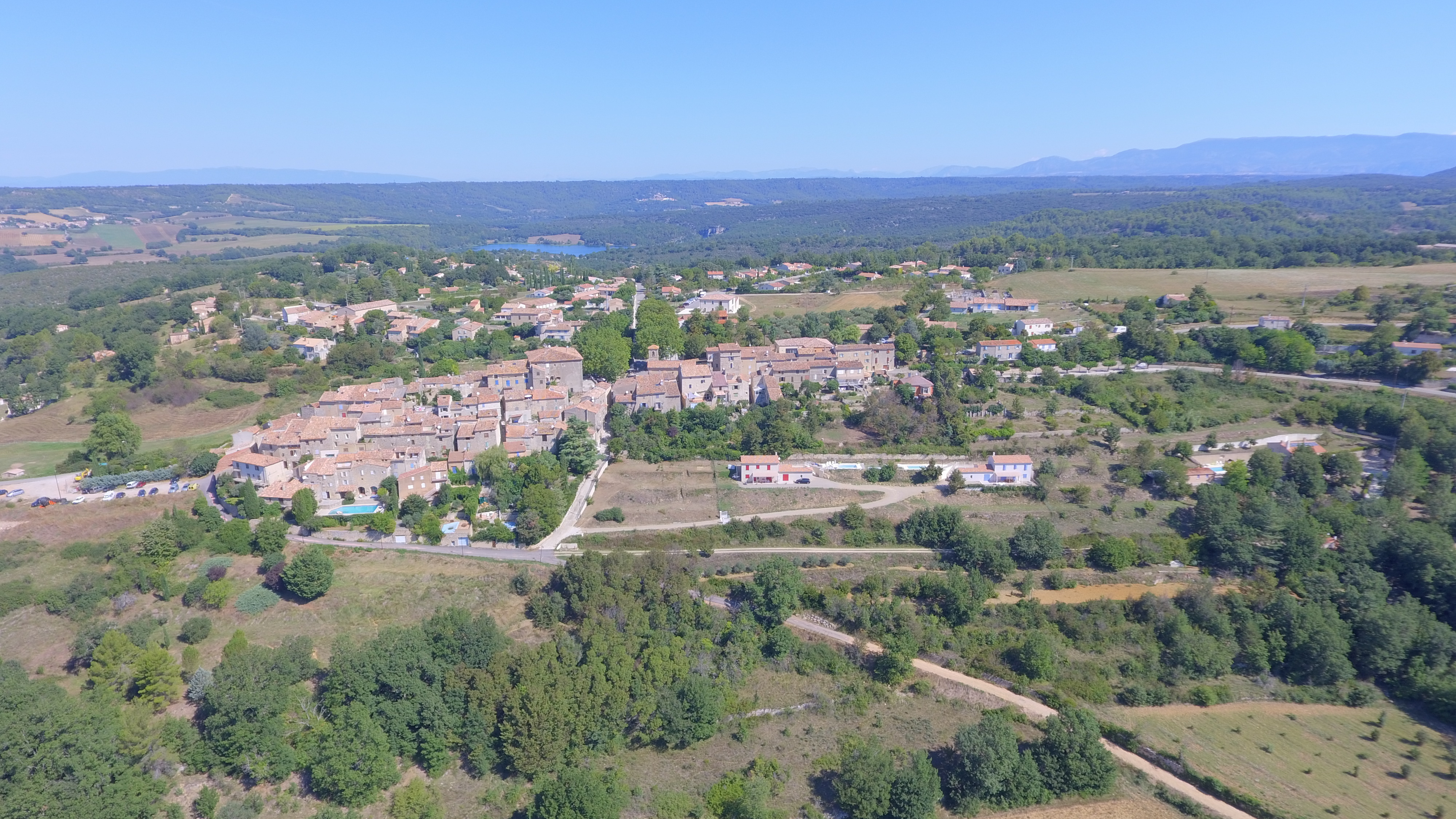
- A view of the village of Artignosc-sur-Verdon

- Coat of arms
- Location of Artignosc-sur-Verdon
- Location within France Location within Provence-Alpes-Côte d'Azur
- Coordinates: 43°42′14″N 6°05′28″E
- Country: France
- Region: Provence-Alpes-Côte d'Azur
- Department: Var
- Arrondissement: Brignoles
- Canton: Flayosc
- Intercommunality: CC Lacs Gorges Verdon

Government
  - Mayor (2020–2026): Serge Constans
- Area^{1}: 18.53 km^{2} (7.15 sq mi)
- Highest elevation: 600 m (2,000 ft)
- Lowest elevation: 401 m (1,316 ft)
- Population (2023): 311
  - Density: 16.8/km^{2} (43.5/sq mi)
- Time zone: UTC+01:00 (CET)
  - Summer (DST): UTC+02:00 (CEST)
- INSEE/Postal code: 83005 /83630
- ^{1} French Land Register data, which excludes lakes, ponds, glaciers > 1 km^{2} (0.386 sq mi or 247 acres) and river estuaries.

Artignosc-sur-Verdon (French pronunciation: [aʁtiɲɔsk syʁ vɛʁdɔ̃], lit. "Artignosc-on-Verdon"; Occitan: Artinhòsc), often simply referred to as Artignosc, is a commune in the Var department in the Provence-Alpes-Côte d'Azur region in Southeastern France. As of 2023, the population of the commune was 311. Artignosc-sur-Verdon is located on the departmental border with Alpes-de-Haute-Provence to the north, on left bank of the river Verdon that marks part of it.

== See also ==
- Communes of the Var department
