= Solliès-Ville =

- Commune
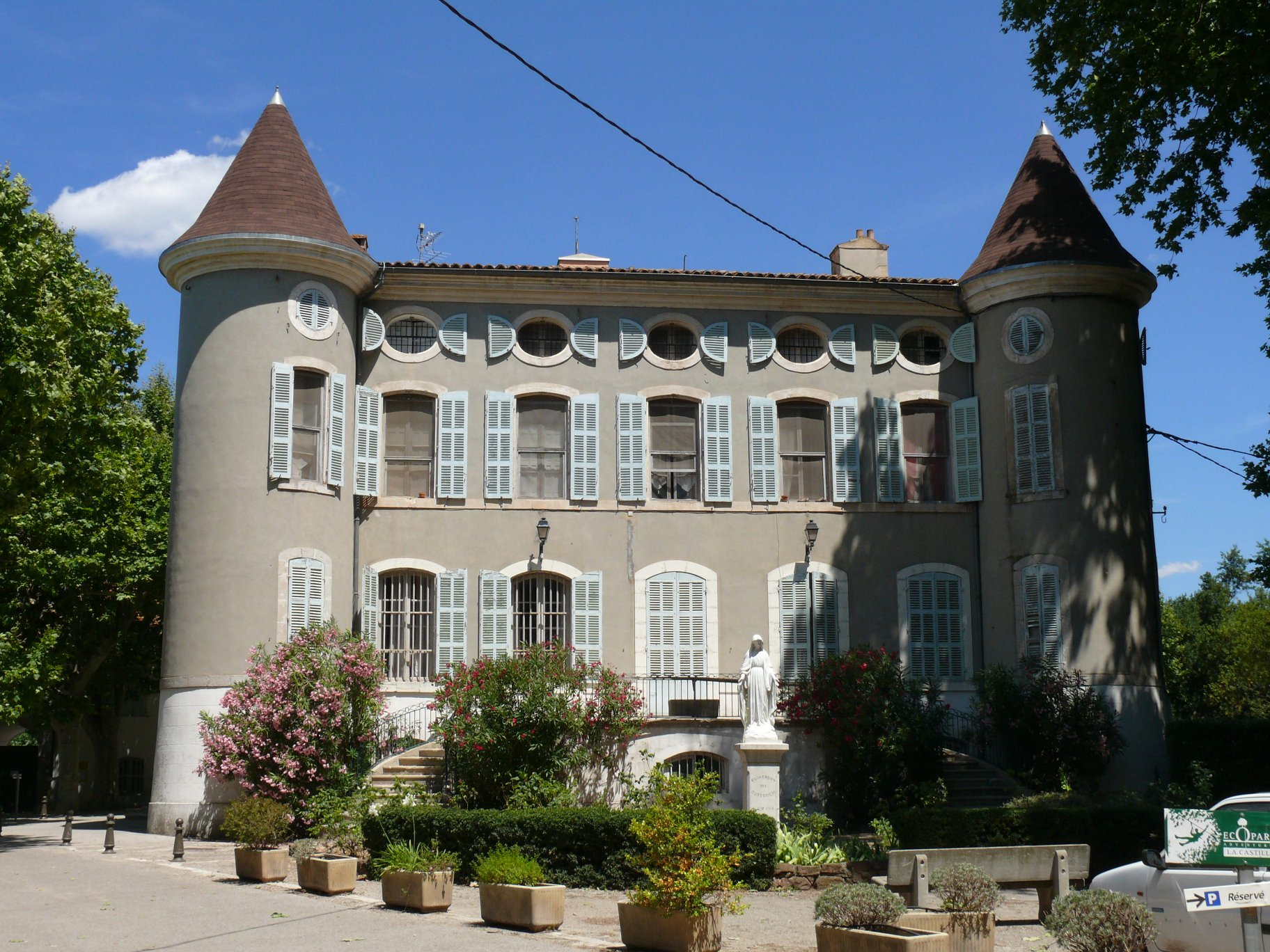
- The castle of the diocesan domain of La Castille in Solliès-Ville

- Coat of arms
- Location of Solliès-Ville
- Location within France Location within Provence-Alpes-Côte d'Azur
- Coordinates: 43°10′59″N 6°02′20″E
- Country: France
- Region: Provence-Alpes-Côte d'Azur
- Department: Var
- Arrondissement: Toulon
- Canton: Solliès-Pont
- Intercommunality: Vallée du Gapeau

Government
  - Mayor (2020–2026): Nicolas Gerardin
- Area^{1}: 14.1 km^{2} (5.4 sq mi)
- Elevation: 228 m (748 ft)
- Highest elevation: 680 m (2,230 ft)
- Lowest elevation: 40 m (130 ft)
- Population (2023): 2,504
  - Density: 178/km^{2} (460/sq mi)
- Time zone: UTC+01:00 (CET)
  - Summer (DST): UTC+02:00 (CEST)
- INSEE/Postal code: 83132 /83210
- ^{1} French Land Register data, which excludes lakes, ponds, glaciers > 1 km^{2} (0.386 sq mi or 247 acres) and river estuaries.

Solliès-Ville (French pronunciation: [sɔljɛs vil]; Occitan: Soliers-Vila) is a commune in the Var department in the Provence-Alpes-Côte d'Azur region in southeastern France.

== Population ==
Historical population
Year	Pop.	±% p.a.
1968	801	—
1975	850	+0.85%
1982	1,193	+4.96%
1990	1,895	+5.95%
1999	2,247	+1.91%
2007	2,433	+1.00%
2012	2,454	+0.17%
2017	2,450	−0.03%
2023	2,504	+0.36%
Source: INSEE

== See also ==
- Communes of the Var department
