= Tourtour =

- Commune
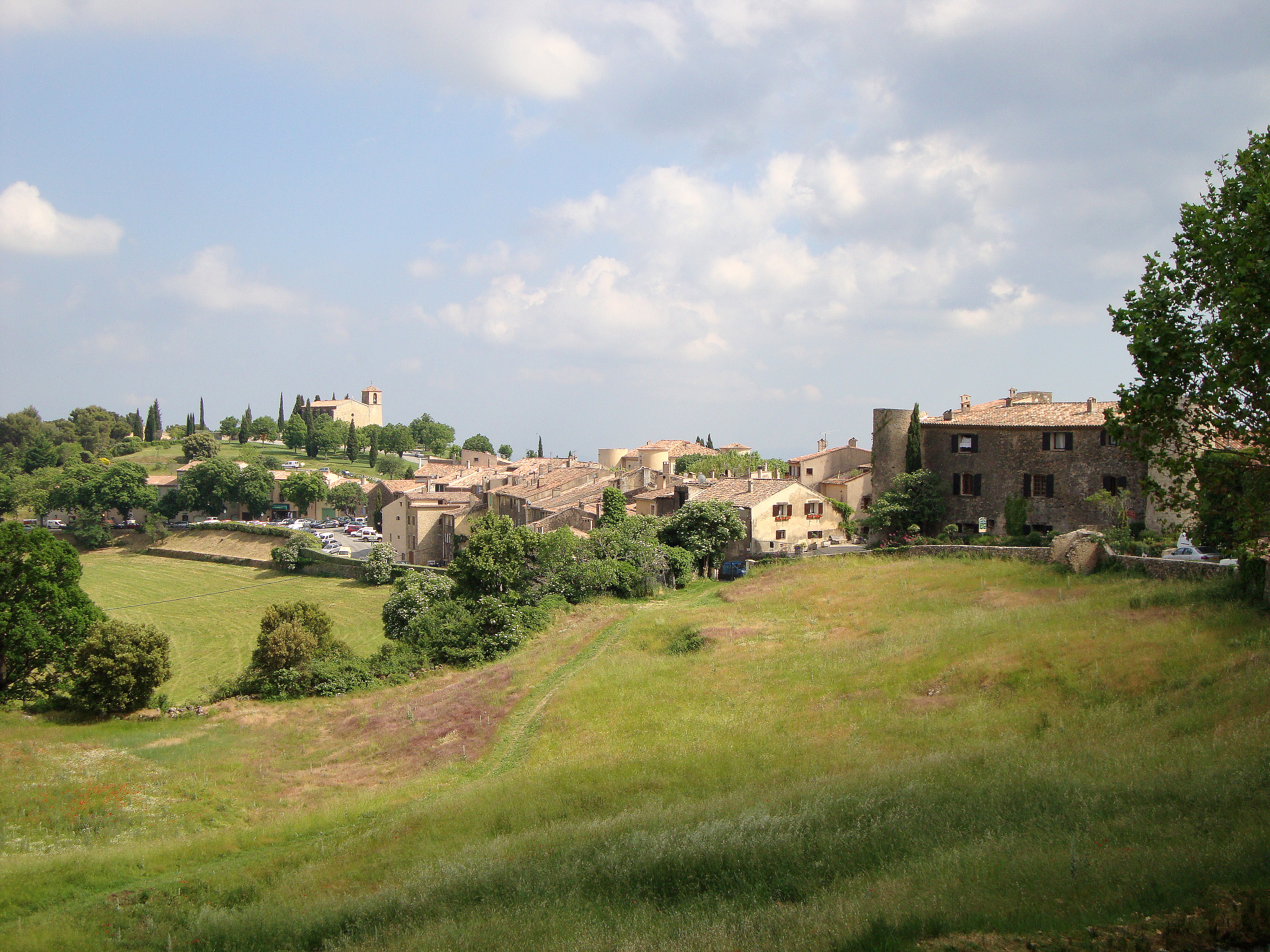
- Overview of Tourtour

- Coat of arms
- Location of Tourtour
- Location within France Location within Provence-Alpes-Côte d'Azur
- Coordinates: 43°35′25″N 6°18′11″E
- Country: France
- Region: Provence-Alpes-Côte d'Azur
- Department: Var
- Arrondissement: Brignoles
- Canton: Flayosc

Government
  - Mayor (2020–2026): Fabien Brieugne
- Area^{1}: 28.69 km^{2} (11.08 sq mi)
- Elevation: 635 m (2,083 ft)
- Highest elevation: 904 m (2,966 ft)
- Lowest elevation: 375 m (1,230 ft)
- Population (2023): 581
  - Density: 20.3/km^{2} (52.4/sq mi)
- Time zone: UTC+01:00 (CET)
  - Summer (DST): UTC+02:00 (CEST)
- INSEE/Postal code: 83139 /83690
- ^{1} French Land Register data, which excludes lakes, ponds, glaciers > 1 km^{2} (0.386 sq mi or 247 acres) and river estuaries.

Tourtour (French pronunciation: [tuʁtuʁ]; Occitan: Tortor) is a commune in the Var department in the Provence-Alpes-Côte d'Azur region in southeastern France. It is a member of Les Plus Beaux Villages de France ("The most beautiful villages of France") association.

== Geography ==
Called "the village in the sky of Provence" (le village dans le ciel de Provence), Tourtour overlooks a large part of Provence from the town of Fréjus along the Mediterranean coast in the east to the Montagne Sainte-Victoire, a favorite subject of the painter Paul Cézanne, in the west.

== In popular culture ==
The Bastide de Tourtour, a local hotel, was prominently featured in the film Day of the Jackal and the 2010 ITV series "Monte Carlo or bust".

== Sister cities ==
- Portaria, Greece

== Gallery ==
Sights of Tourtour

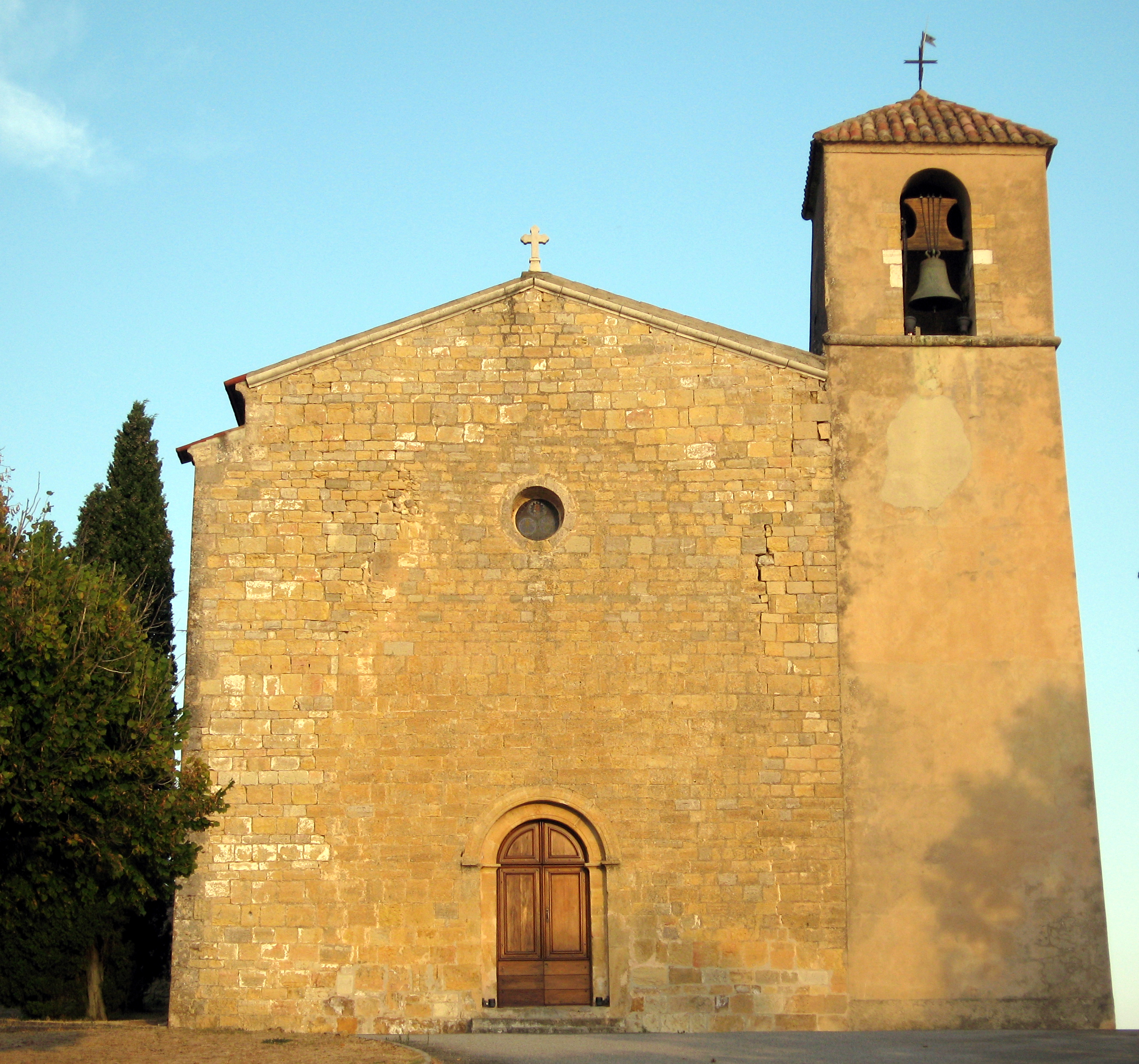
The Romanesque Saint-Denis Church

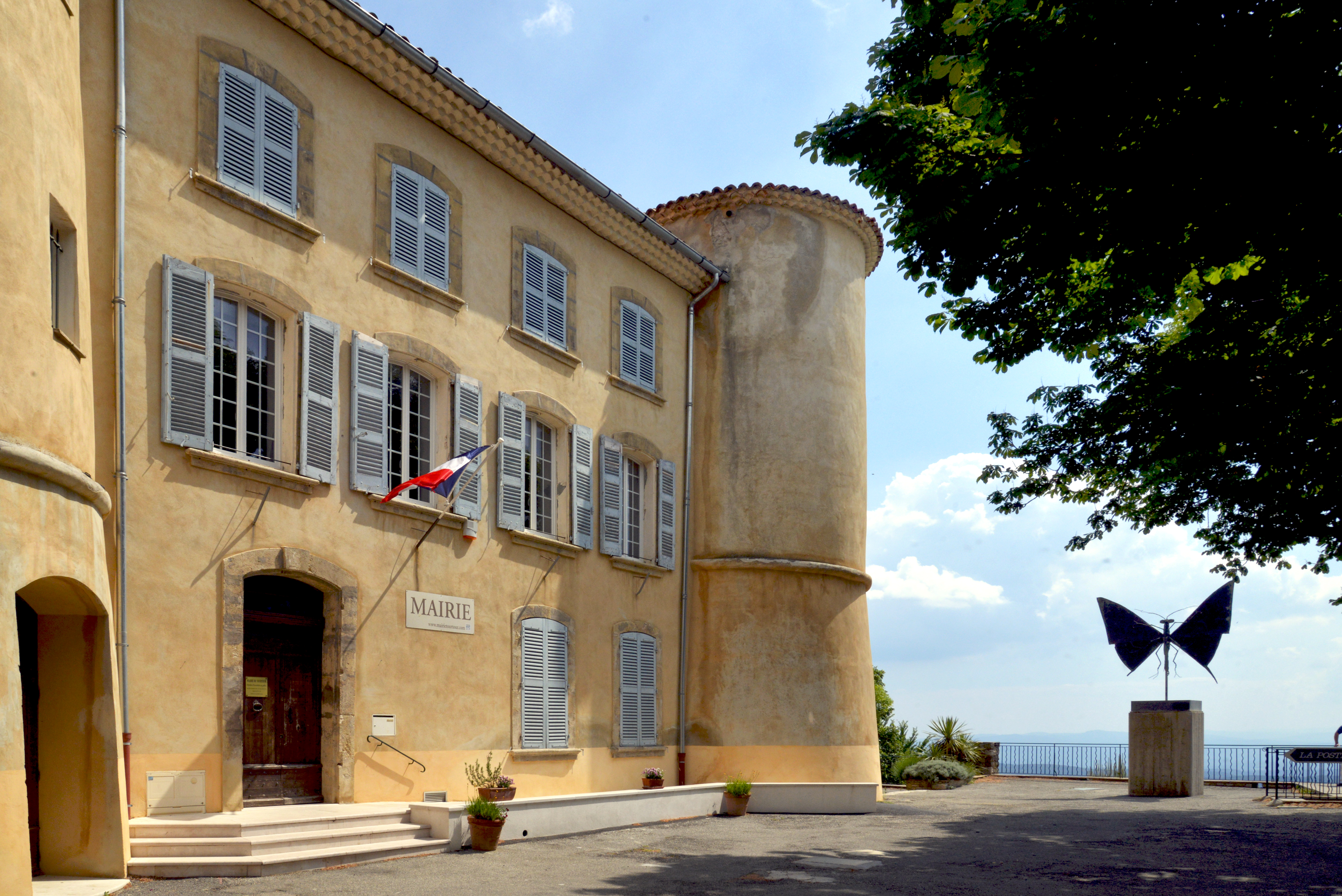
Tourtour town hall

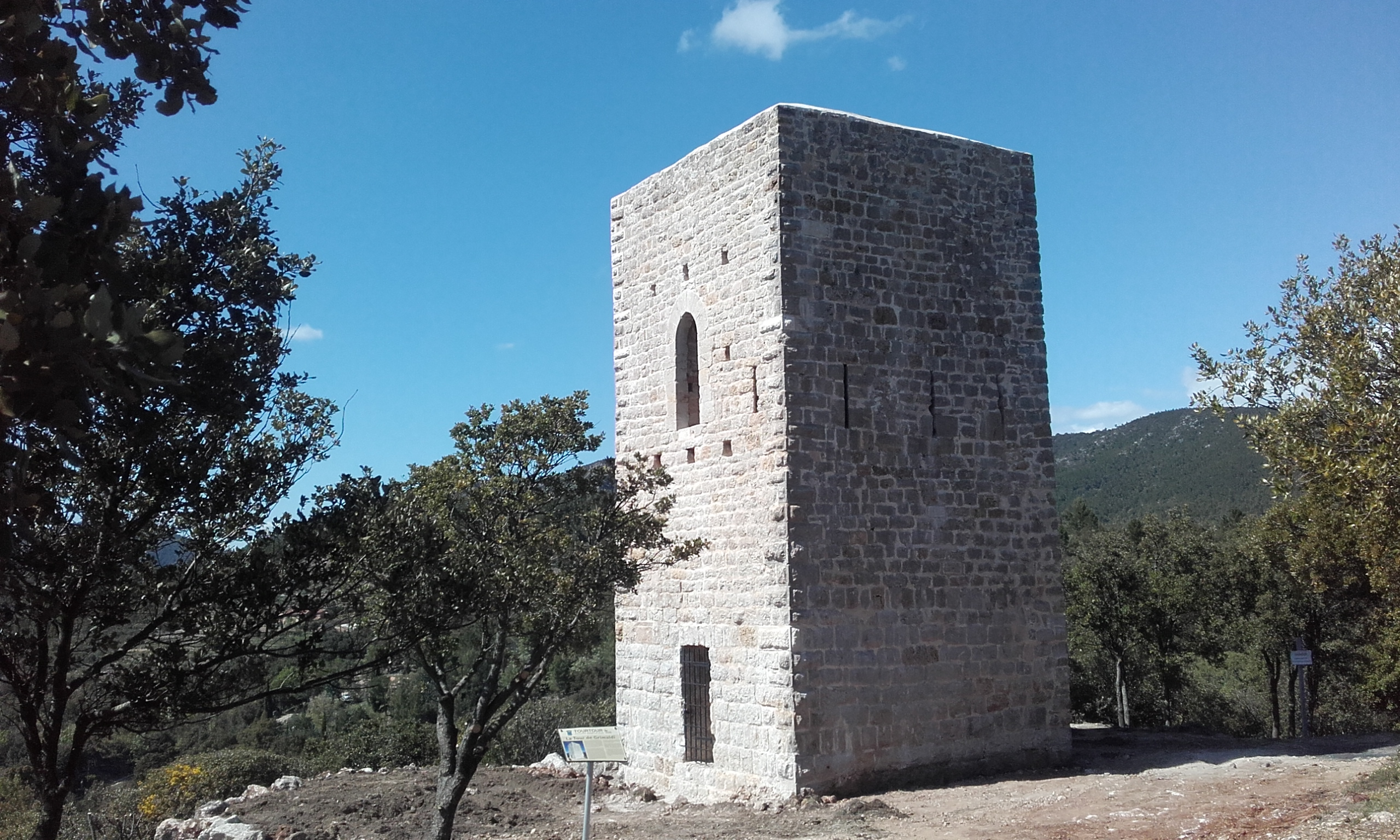
Grimaldi tower

== See also ==
- Communes of the Var department
