= Brenon =

- Commune
- Coat of arms
- Location of Brenon
- Location within France Location within Provence-Alpes-Côte d'Azur
- Coordinates: 43°46′13″N 6°32′33″E
- Country: France
- Region: Provence-Alpes-Côte d'Azur
- Department: Var
- Arrondissement: Draguignan
- Canton: Flayosc

Government
  - Mayor (2020–2026): Armand Rouvier
- Area^{1}: 5.59 km^{2} (2.16 sq mi)
- Elevation: 900 m (3,000 ft)
- Highest elevation: 1,264 m (4,147 ft)
- Lowest elevation: 782 m (2,566 ft)
- Population (2023): 24
  - Density: 4.3/km^{2} (11/sq mi)
- Time zone: UTC+01:00 (CET)
  - Summer (DST): UTC+02:00 (CEST)
- INSEE/Postal code: 83022 /83840
- ^{1} French Land Register data, which excludes lakes, ponds, glaciers > 1 km^{2} (0.386 sq mi or 247 acres) and river estuaries.

Brenon (French pronunciation: [bʁənɔ̃]) is a commune in the Var department in the Provence-Alpes-Côte d'Azur region in southeastern France.

== See also ==
- Communes of the Var department
