= Le Bourguet =

- Commune
- Coat of arms
- Location of Le Bourguet
- Location within France Location within Provence-Alpes-Côte d'Azur
- Coordinates: 43°47′06″N 6°31′10″E
- Country: France
- Region: Provence-Alpes-Côte d'Azur
- Department: Var
- Arrondissement: Draguignan
- Canton: Flayosc

Government
  - Mayor (2020–2026): Jean-Paul Roux
- Area^{1}: 25.39 km^{2} (9.80 sq mi)
- Elevation: 840 m (2,760 ft)
- Highest elevation: 1,245 m (4,085 ft)
- Lowest elevation: 763 m (2,503 ft)
- Population (2023): 42
  - Density: 1.7/km^{2} (4.3/sq mi)
- Time zone: UTC+01:00 (CET)
  - Summer (DST): UTC+02:00 (CEST)
- INSEE/Postal code: 83020 /83840
- ^{1} French Land Register data, which excludes lakes, ponds, glaciers > 1 km^{2} (0.386 sq mi or 247 acres) and river estuaries.

Le Bourguet (French pronunciation: [lə buʁɡɛ]; Occitan: Lo Borguet) is a commune in the Var department in the Provence-Alpes-Côte d'Azur region in southeastern France. It has 41 inhabitants (2019).

== See also ==
- Communes of the Var department
