= Canton of Flayosc =

Coordinates: 43.53°N 6.40°E

The canton of Flayosc is an administrative division of the Var department, southeastern France. It was created at the French canton reorganisation which came into effect in March 2015. Its seat is in Flayosc.

It consists of the following communes:

1. Aiguines
2. Ampus
3. Artignosc-sur-Verdon
4. Aups
5. Bargème
6. Bargemon
7. La Bastide
8. Baudinard-sur-Verdon
9. Bauduen
10. Le Bourguet
11. Brenon
12. Callas
13. Châteaudouble
14. Châteauvieux
15. Claviers
16. Comps-sur-Artuby
17. Figanières
18. Flayosc
19. Fox-Amphoux
20. La Martre
21. Moissac-Bellevue
22. Montferrat
23. Montmeyan
24. La Motte
25. Régusse
26. La Roque-Esclapon
27. Salernes
28. Les Salles-sur-Verdon
29. Sillans-la-Cascade
30. Tavernes
31. Tourtour
32. Trigance
33. Vérignon
34. Villecroze
