= Aiguines =

Aiguines Aiguina (Occitan)
- Commune
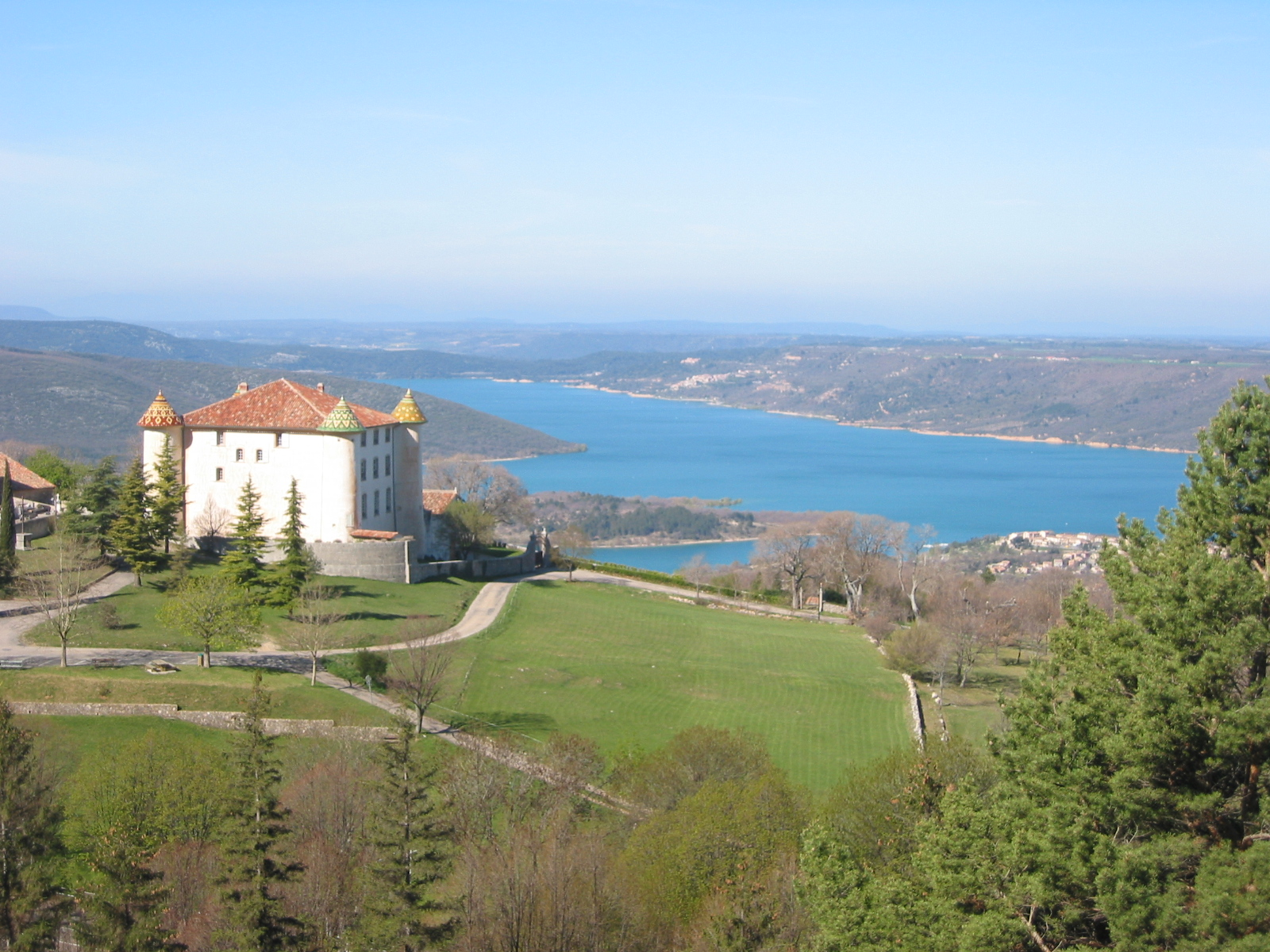
- The Château d'Aiguines with its view of the Lake of Sainte-Croix

- Coat of arms
- Location of Aiguines
- Location within France Location within Provence-Alpes-Côte d'Azur
- Coordinates: 43°46′33″N 6°14′35″E
- Country: France
- Region: Provence-Alpes-Côte d'Azur
- Department: Var
- Arrondissement: Brignoles
- Canton: Flayosc
- Intercommunality: Lacs et Gorges du Verdon

Government
  - Mayor (2020–2026): Charles-Antoine Mordelet
- Area^{1}: 114.43 km^{2} (44.18 sq mi)
- Elevation: 817 m (2,680 ft)
- Highest elevation: 1,572 m (5,157 ft)
- Lowest elevation: 470 m (1,540 ft)
- Population (2023): 274
  - Density: 2.39/km^{2} (6.20/sq mi)
- Time zone: UTC+01:00 (CET)
  - Summer (DST): UTC+02:00 (CEST)
- INSEE/Postal code: 83002 /83630
- ^{1} French Land Register data, which excludes lakes, ponds, glaciers > 1 km^{2} (0.386 sq mi or 247 acres) and river estuaries.

Aiguines (French pronunciation: [ɛɡin]; Occitan: Aiguina) is a rural commune in the Var department in the Provence-Alpes-Côte d'Azur region in Southeastern France.

It is located within the arrondissement of Brignoles, 18 km (11.1 mi) southwest of Castellane in neighbouring Alpes-de-Haute-Provence, the departmental border with which Aiguines is located on, following the flow of the Verdon River.

== Geography ==
=== Climate ===
Aiguines has a hot-summer Mediterranean climate (Köppen climate classification Csa) closely bordering on a humid subtropical climate (Cfa). The average annual temperature in Aiguines is 13.6 °C (56.5 °F). The average annual rainfall is 805.6 mm (31.72 in) with November as the wettest month. The temperatures are highest on average in July, at around 23.1 °C (73.6 °F), and lowest in January, at around 5.4 °C (41.7 °F). The highest temperature ever recorded in Aiguines was 42.3 °C (108.1 °F) on 28 June 2019; the coldest temperature ever recorded was −12.2 °C (10.0 °F) on 7 February 2012.

Climate data for Aiguines (1991−2020 normals, extremes 2004−present)
Month	Jan	Feb	Mar	Apr	May	Jun	Jul	Aug	Sep	Oct	Nov	Dec	Year
Record high °C (°F)	24.1 (75.4)	22.9 (73.2)	25.4 (77.7)	28.2 (82.8)	32.3 (90.1)	42.3 (108.1)	38.1 (100.6)	39.2 (102.6)	33.8 (92.8)	30.9 (87.6)	23.1 (73.6)	20.1 (68.2)	42.3 (108.1)
Mean daily maximum °C (°F)	10.5 (50.9)	11.3 (52.3)	15.0 (59.0)	18.6 (65.5)	22.2 (72.0)	27.1 (80.8)	30.5 (86.9)	29.9 (85.8)	25.3 (77.5)	20.3 (68.5)	14.7 (58.5)	11.0 (51.8)	19.7 (67.5)
Daily mean °C (°F)	5.4 (41.7)	5.6 (42.1)	8.7 (47.7)	12.3 (54.1)	15.9 (60.6)	20.3 (68.5)	23.1 (73.6)	22.6 (72.7)	19.0 (66.2)	14.9 (58.8)	9.9 (49.8)	6.1 (43.0)	13.6 (56.5)
Mean daily minimum °C (°F)	0.3 (32.5)	−0.1 (31.8)	2.5 (36.5)	6.1 (43.0)	9.6 (49.3)	13.5 (56.3)	15.6 (60.1)	15.4 (59.7)	12.7 (54.9)	9.6 (49.3)	5.0 (41.0)	1.3 (34.3)	7.6 (45.7)
Record low °C (°F)	−8.7 (16.3)	−12.2 (10.0)	−8.5 (16.7)	−3.1 (26.4)	1.2 (34.2)	3.4 (38.1)	8.8 (47.8)	8.5 (47.3)	1.9 (35.4)	−1.4 (29.5)	−6.3 (20.7)	−9.2 (15.4)	−12.2 (10.0)
Average precipitation mm (inches)	63.8 (2.51)	53.5 (2.11)	62.3 (2.45)	78.2 (3.08)	80.8 (3.18)	64.5 (2.54)	35.3 (1.39)	52.3 (2.06)	54.2 (2.13)	88.7 (3.49)	100.3 (3.95)	71.7 (2.82)	805.6 (31.72)
Average precipitation days (≥ 1.0 mm)	5.7	6.2	6.9	8.4	7.7	6.3	3.4	5.1	5.0	6.2	7.4	6.1	74.5
Source: Météo-France

== Demographics ==
Historical population
Year	Pop.	±% p.a.
1968	165	—
1975	132	−3.14%
1982	161	+2.88%
1990	207	+3.19%
1999	219	+0.63%
2007	255	+1.92%
2012	269	+1.07%
2017	276	+0.52%
2023	274	−0.12%
Source: INSEE

== Gallery ==
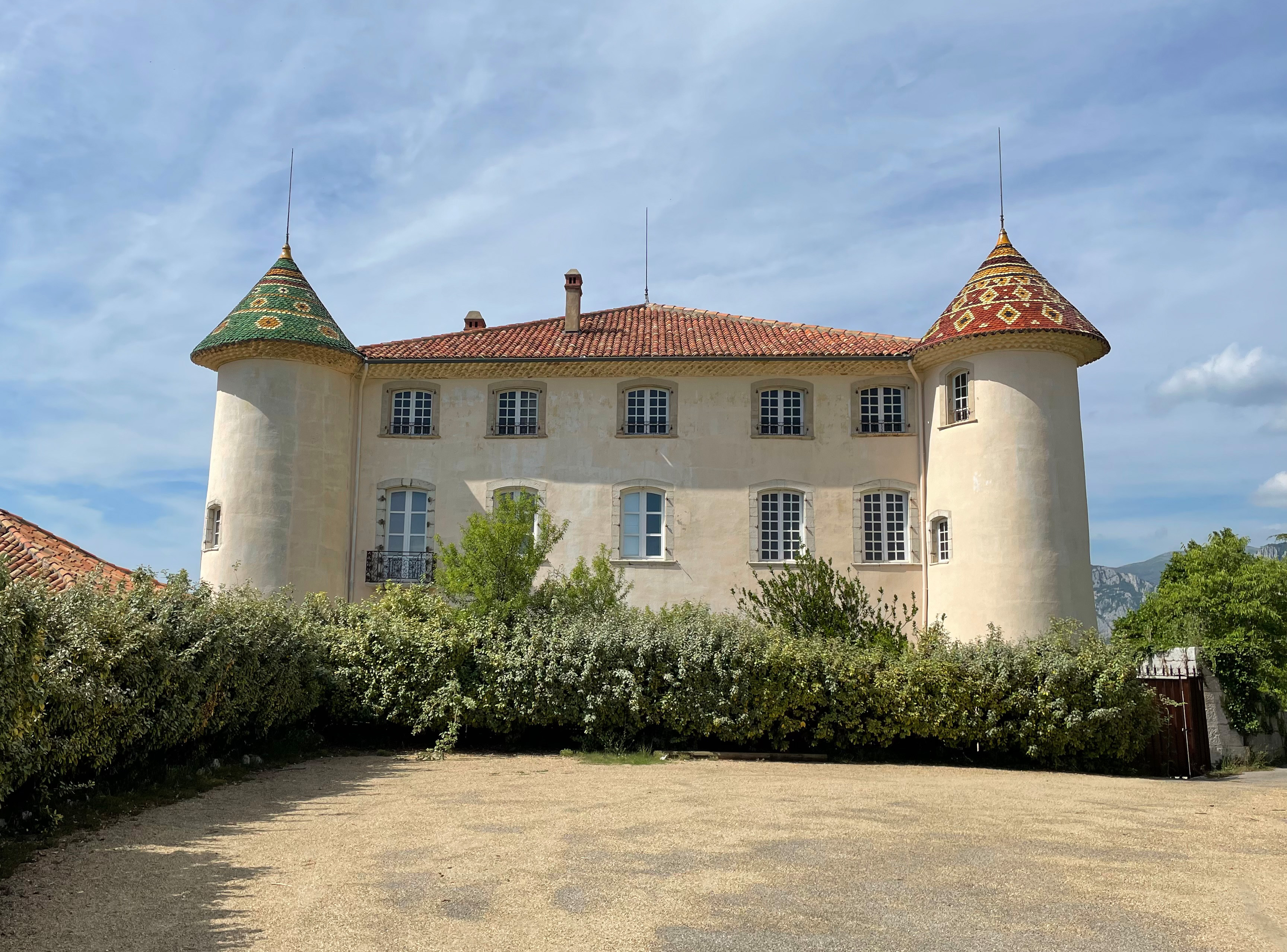
Aiguines castle

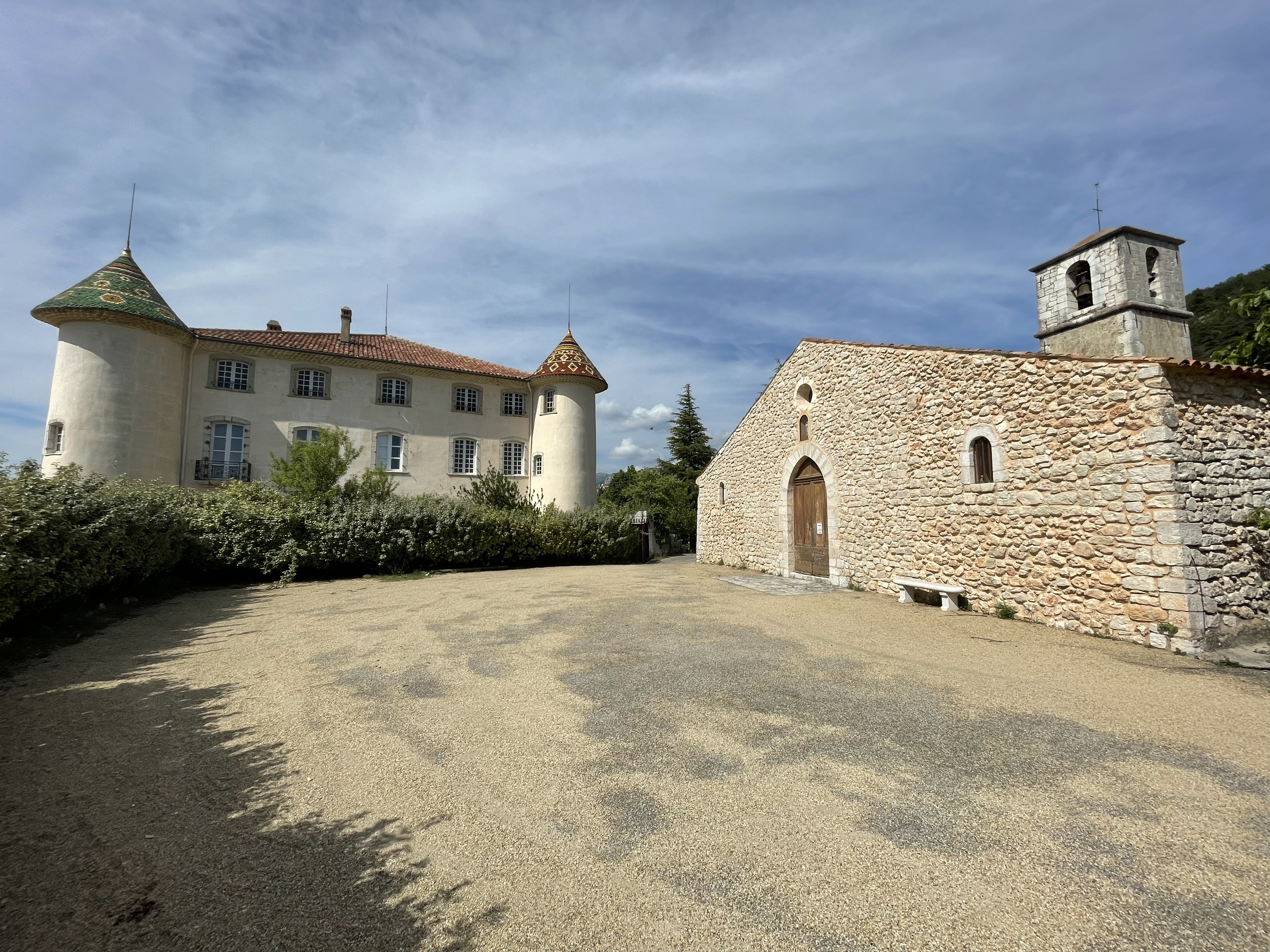
Aiguines castle and church of Saint-Jean

== See also ==
- Communes of the Var department
