= Trigance =

- Commune
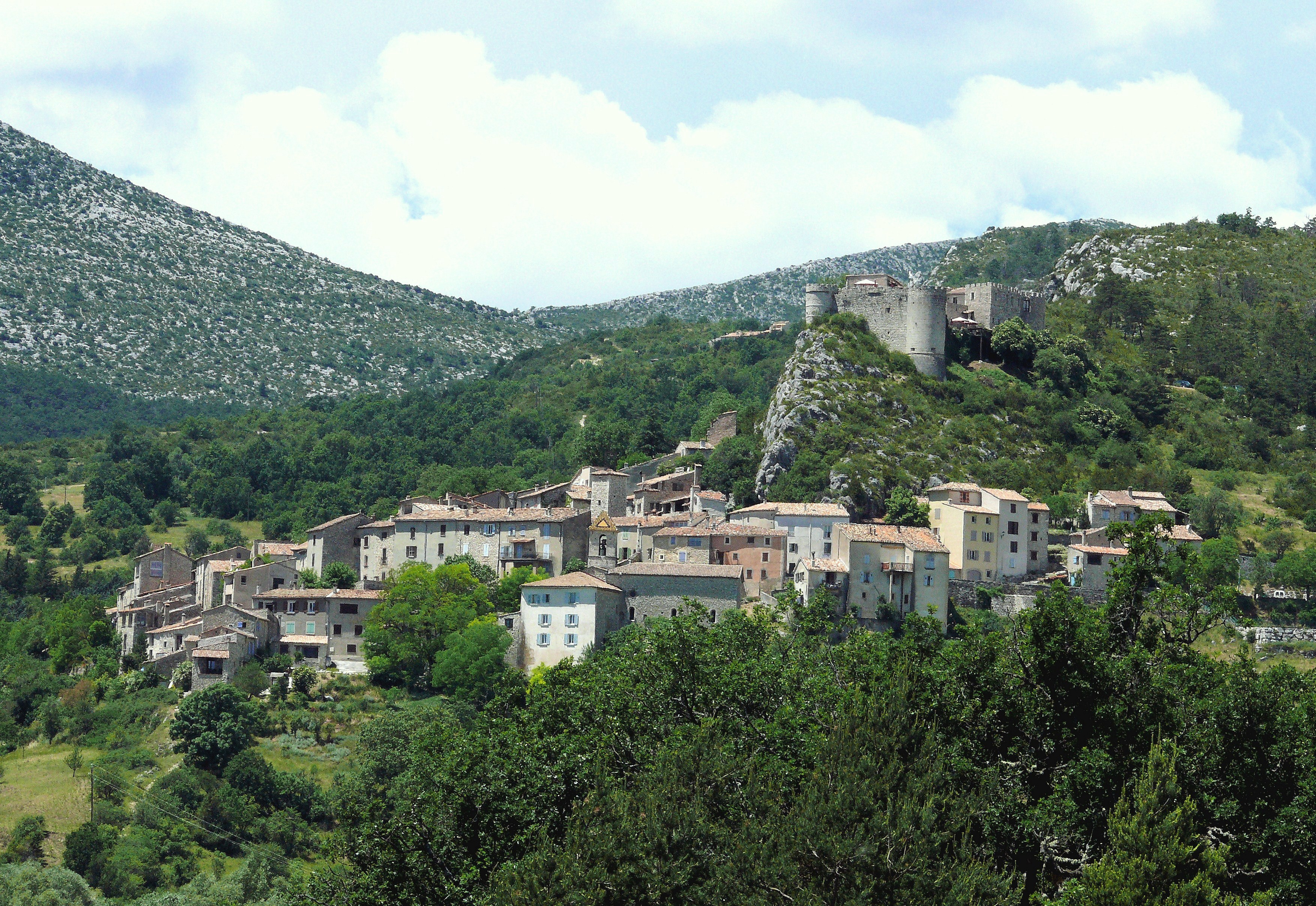
- The village overlooked by the castle

- Coat of arms
- Location of Trigance
- Location within France Location within Provence-Alpes-Côte d'Azur
- Coordinates: 43°45′43″N 6°26′41″E
- Country: France
- Region: Provence-Alpes-Côte d'Azur
- Department: Var
- Arrondissement: Draguignan
- Canton: Flayosc

Government
  - Mayor (2020–2026): Stéphane Laval
- Area^{1}: 60.6 km^{2} (23.4 sq mi)
- Elevation: 800 m (2,600 ft)
- Highest elevation: 1,270 m (4,170 ft)
- Lowest elevation: 630 m (2,070 ft)
- Population (2023): 232
  - Density: 3.83/km^{2} (9.92/sq mi)
- Time zone: UTC+01:00 (CET)
  - Summer (DST): UTC+02:00 (CEST)
- INSEE/Postal code: 83142 /83840
- ^{1} French Land Register data, which excludes lakes, ponds, glaciers > 1 km^{2} (0.386 sq mi or 247 acres) and river estuaries.

Trigance (French pronunciation: [tʁiɡɑ̃s]; Occitan: Trigança) is a commune in the Var department in the Provence-Alpes-Côte d'Azur region in southeastern France.

== See also ==
- Communes of the Var department
