= Flayosc =

Flayosc Flaiòsc (Occitan)
- Commune
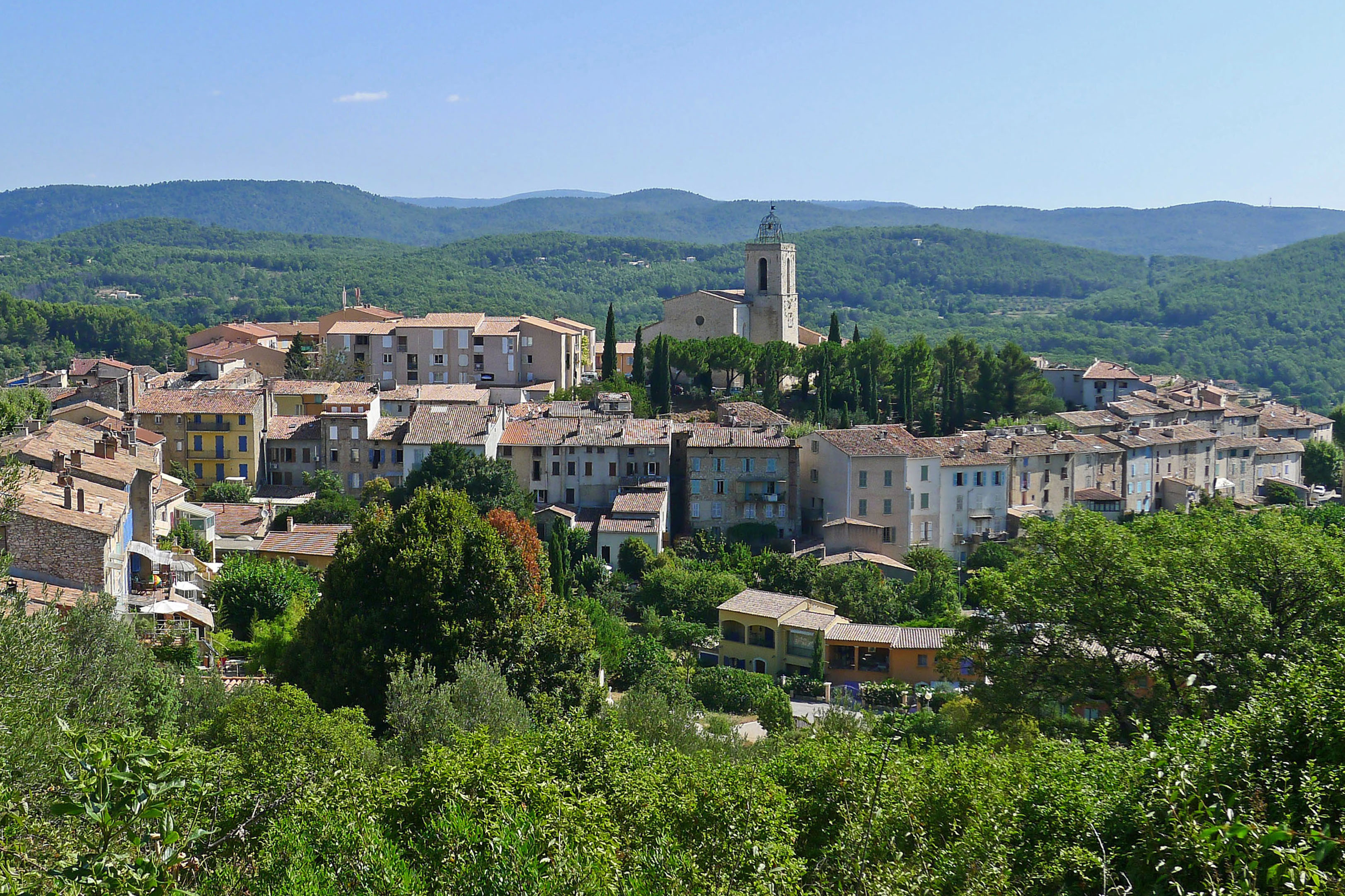
- A view of the town from the road to Colle

- Coat of arms
- Location of Flayosc
- Location within France Location within Provence-Alpes-Côte d'Azur
- Coordinates: 43°32′06″N 6°23′51″E
- Country: France
- Region: Provence-Alpes-Côte d'Azur
- Department: Var
- Arrondissement: Draguignan
- Canton: Flayosc
- Intercommunality: CA Dracénie Provence Verdon

Government
  - Mayor (2020–2026): Karine Alsters
- Area^{1}: 45.95 km^{2} (17.74 sq mi)
- Elevation: 235 m (771 ft)
- Highest elevation: 752 m (2,467 ft)
- Lowest elevation: 140 m (460 ft)
- Population (2023): 4,673
  - Density: 101.7/km^{2} (263.4/sq mi)
- Time zone: UTC+01:00 (CET)
  - Summer (DST): UTC+02:00 (CEST)
- INSEE/Postal code: 83058 /83780
- ^{1} French Land Register data, which excludes lakes, ponds, glaciers > 1 km^{2} (0.386 sq mi or 247 acres) and river estuaries.

Flayosc (French pronunciation: [flajɔsk]; Provençal Occitan: Flaiòsc) is a commune in the Var department in the Provence-Alpes-Côte d'Azur region in Southeastern France.

== Geography ==
Flayosc is 7 km (4.3 mi) west of Draguignan, about 35 km (22 mi) from the Mediterranean Sea (to the southeast).

The town is located on a rocky hill, near the church. Three small rivers crosses the village : the Pontchalade, the Florieyes and the Rimalte.

== History ==
=== Antiquity ===
The place allowed local residents to watch over the valley and to protect villages in the neighbourhood, for example Saint-Lambert (far from 5 km).

After the destruction of Antea, a village in the neighbourhood, by the Roman Empire, people decided to live in this place.

=== Since 1789 ===
The lord of Flayosc lost his powers and his castle during the French Revolution.

In the 19th century, the village became a place where shoes were made : many factories were created. The village had, thanks to this activity, a long prosperous period. About 3,000 people lived in Flayosc in 1914.

== Population ==
Historical population
Year	Pop.	±% p.a.
1968	1,454	—
1975	1,867	+3.64%
1982	2,384	+3.55%
1990	3,233	+3.88%
1999	3,924	+2.18%
2007	4,341	+1.27%
2012	4,366	+0.11%
2017	4,294	−0.33%
2023	4,673	+1.42%
Source: INSEE

== Natural patrimony, fauna and flora ==
The village is classified in Zone Natura 2000 and in Zone Naturelle d'Intérêt Ecologique, Faunistique et Floristique.

== Twin towns ==
- (Italy) Vezza d'Oglio since 2002

== Bibliography ==
- Charles-Laurent Salch, Dictionnaire des châteaux et fortifications de la France au Moyen Âge, ed. Publitotal, reprint 1991, page 478.

== See also ==
- Communes of the Var department
- Draguignan
