= Vérignon =

- Commune
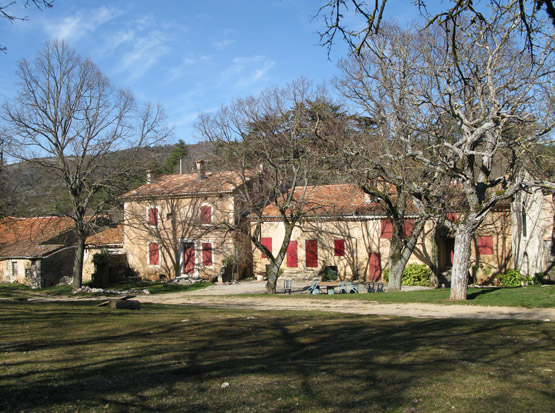
- The south side of the village

- Coat of arms
- Location of Vérignon
- Location within France Location within Provence-Alpes-Côte d'Azur
- Coordinates: 43°39′13″N 6°16′25″E
- Country: France
- Region: Provence-Alpes-Côte d'Azur
- Department: Var
- Arrondissement: Brignoles
- Canton: Flayosc
- Intercommunality: Lacs et Gorges du Verdon

Government
  - Mayor (2020–2026): Philippe Murat-David
- Area^{1}: 36.9 km^{2} (14.2 sq mi)
- Elevation: 850 m (2,790 ft)
- Highest elevation: 1,142 m (3,747 ft)
- Lowest elevation: 696 m (2,283 ft)
- Population (2023): 8
  - Density: 0.22/km^{2} (0.56/sq mi)
- Time zone: UTC+01:00 (CET)
  - Summer (DST): UTC+02:00 (CEST)
- INSEE/Postal code: 83147 /83630
- ^{1} French Land Register data, which excludes lakes, ponds, glaciers > 1 km^{2} (0.386 sq mi or 247 acres) and river estuaries.

Vérignon (French pronunciation: [veʁiɲɔ̃]; Verinhon in Classical Provençal and Verignoun in Provençal of the mistralian norm) is a commune in the Var department in the Provence-Alpes-Côte d'Azur region in southeastern France.

== Géography ==
The town is situated at the foot of the Great Canjuers Plain, at the heart of a forest of oaks. 15 square kilometres of the commune were requisitioned for the Canjuers military camp in 1970.

== History ==
Canjuers is supposed to be derived from the Latin Campus Julii (the field of Julius), preserving a folk-memory of Julius Caesar's army passing across it during the Gallic Wars. On a mountain range between Aups and Vérignon is an oppidum of the Verrucini. In the Roman era, the main road that linked up Fréjus to Riez passed through Vérignon, and four milestones have been discovered.

The plain is also an important findspot for prehistoric fossils, with most of those found being conserved fossils in the château at Vérignon, not open to the public. According to Raoul Bérenguier, the Blacas seigneurs of Aups installed themselves in Vérignon around the year 1000 and constructed their castle on a rocky outcrop in the town. It had an encircling wall, rectangular living quarters in the north corner, a private chapel of the Assumption for the Blacas (with their family vault under its altar), and a barbican round its south gate. However, this castle proved too constricted, uncomfortable and small, and was abandoned at the start of the 18th century, with the Blacas building a new, unfortified château, which remained in their hands until 1947. It is rectangular in plan, with two levels of overhanging elevations, an attic-storey, and corner towers. Two short wings project out from and frame the main building. The castle stands up in the middle of a magnificent park.

Up to the nineteenth century, the town had 120 inhabitants.

=== Churches ===
The Chapel of Notre-Dame de Liesse, at 991 m above sea level, is an oratory found between Aups and Vérignon. A lady from the Blacas family came here to await the arrival of her son back from the Crusades and vowed to construct a chapel as soon as he should return safely. He did return, and it was built as a witness of the "liesse" of the family. At 1.066 km altitude on the same mountain range is the Chapel Saint Priest, built in 1098.

== Population ==
Historical population
Year	Pop.	±% p.a.
1968	48	—
1975	17	−13.78%
1982	14	−2.74%
1990	26	+8.05%
1999	16	−5.25%
2007	17	+0.76%
2012	10	−10.07%
2017	10	+0.00%
2023	8	−3.65%
Source: INSEE

== Personalities ==
- Casimir Blacas d'Aulps (1771–1839), counsellor to Louis XVIII

== See also ==
- Communes of the Var department
