= Provence Canal =

Canal in southern France

Canal de Provence
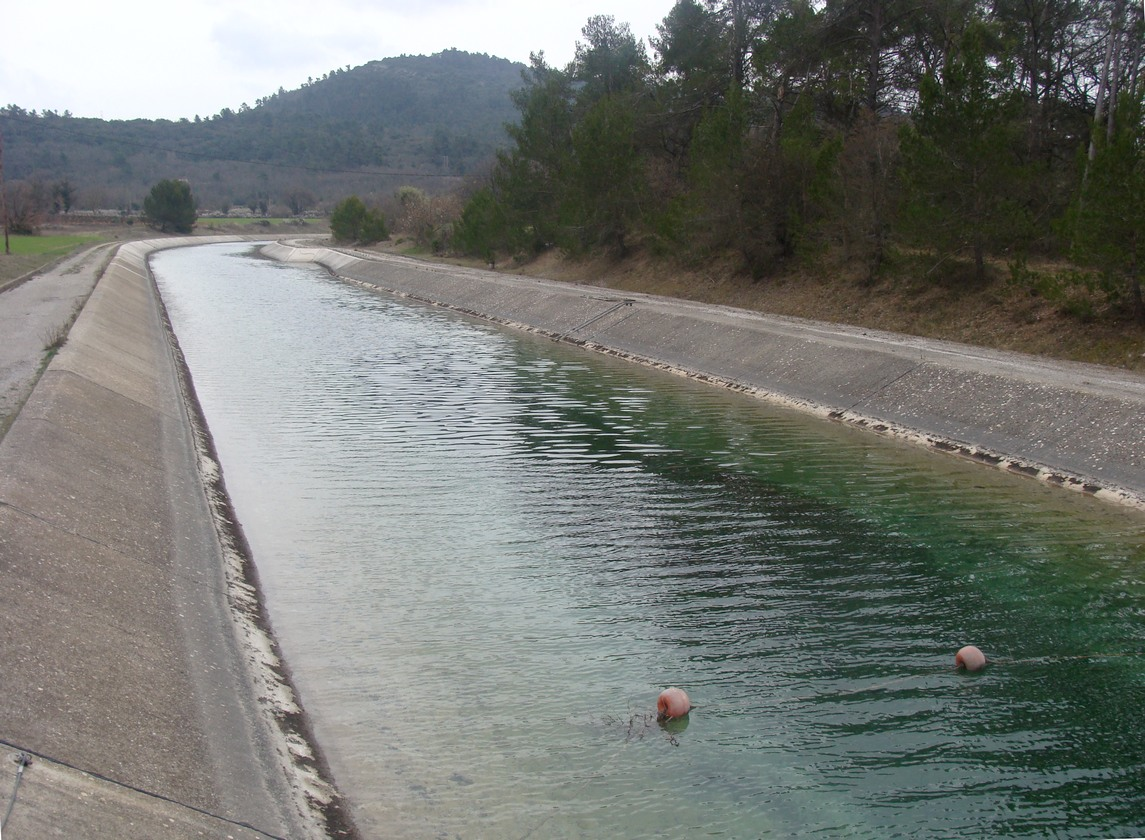
- The canal in the Var department
- Interactive map of Canal de Provence
- Location: Bouches-du-Rhône, Var
- Country: France

Specifications
- Status: Irrigation canal

History
- Current owner: Société du Canal de Provence et d'aménagement de la Région Provençale
- Date of first use: 1969

Geography
- Start point: Verdon

The Canal de Provence (French pronunciation: [kanal də pʁɔvɑ̃s]) is a system of canals that primarily carry raw water from the Verdon to across 110 communes in the Bouches-du-Rhône and Var departments. This network serves mainly the major cities of Aix-en-Provence, Marseille, and Toulon, with a total population of more than 2 million people. This canal system allows for irrigation of about 70,000 hectares (170,000 acres) of agricultural land, while also supplying water to more than 8,000 industrial sites across the region.

Among the total length of 216 kilometres (134 mi), 146 of them are not directly on the ground, instead travelling in tunnels, pipelines, and aqueducts. The canal was first planned in the early 1960s, and came into use in 1964. The canal system was able to avoid effects of drought by supplying water to more arid regions and help with their economic development.

== History ==
The region of Provence lacks any major waterways, and have commonly suffered from water scarcity, especially in summertime. In the 16th century, Adam de Craponne proposed the idea of creating a canal to supply water for the region of Aix and Marseille, but to no avail. During the 19th century, the Canal de Marseille was built, carrying water from the Durance to Marseille. Around the same time, the Canal du Verdon was built, supplying water from the Verdon to Aix en Provence. However, these canals were insufficient by the 20th century.

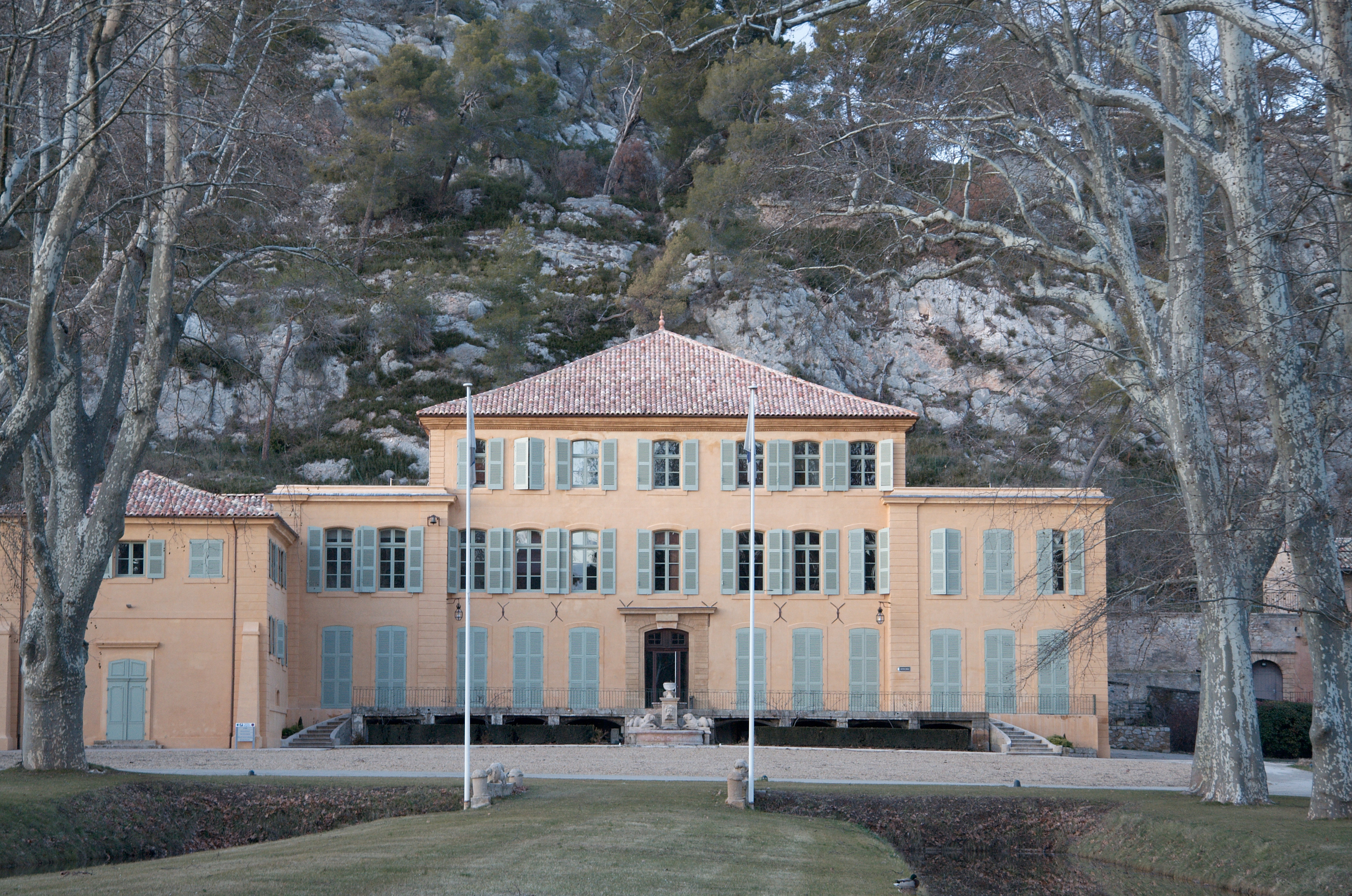
The seat of the Canal de Provence Society, at Tholonet in Bouches-du-Rhône

Following WW2, under the suggestion from the Ministry of Agriculture, the departments of Bouches-du-Rhône, Var, and the city of Aix en Provence decided to construct a new canal for increasing the water supply in the region. It was also decided that this canal would be largely underground since the area is relatively mountainous. In 1957, the Société du Canal de Provence et d'aménagement de la Région Provençale was created to oversee this construction.

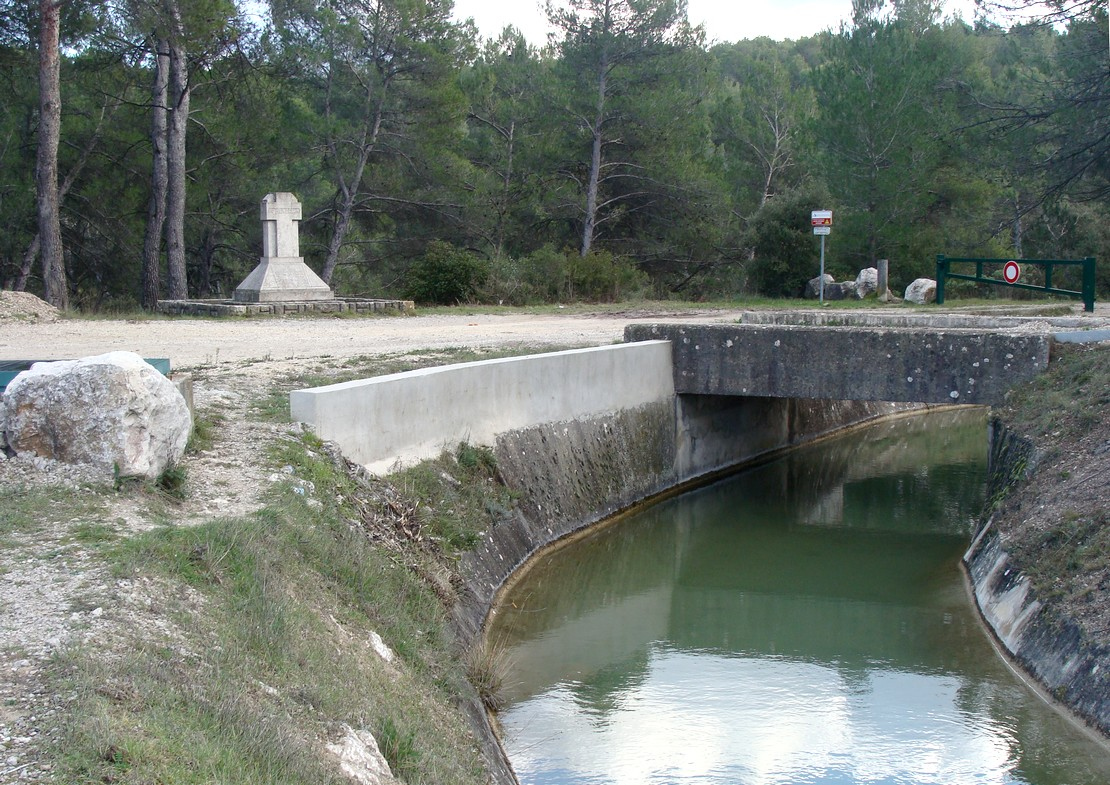
Memorial to Léonce Long, a worker who died on May 2, 1955, at the age of 30, during the construction of this canal

The construction began in 1964, and was coordinated with workers from Électricité de France (EDF), who were working on hydraulic development work in lower Verdon. In Gréoux-les-Bains, a barrage was created, where the canal would carry water towards the hydroelectric center in Vinon-sur-Verdon. The Lac d'Esparron nearby helps feed this canal. The first phase of the construction, named canal-maître I, was completed in 1969.

To secure the water supply in the city of Marseille, a second canal was built from Bimont to the city, which created the Vallon Dol Reservoir. (Note: The reservoir has a capacity of 23 cubic megametres (5.5×10^{9} mi^{3}), which is double the capacity of the Old Port of Marseille) The increase of tourism along the coast made it essential to also supply water to the coast, especially in the Var department. This second phase connected between Rians and Toulon, and was named canal-maître II.

The canal branch towards Marseille was found to be insufficient, and a new branch starting in Pourcieux was built between 1977 and 1986.

There are developments underway towards the eastern part of Var.

== Operation ==
The Canal de Provence has a total length of 216 kilometres (134 mi), with 146 kilometres (91 mi) of them underground, and includes a total of 82 barrages. The canal provides water for more than 2 million people across two departments, and is run by the Société du canal de Provence (SCP).

Including supply pipelines, the canal system adds to be over 4,500 kilometres (2,800 mi) long, with over 50,000 delivery stations. The destinations of the water from the canal include: residential use in 110 communes (30%), industry in Gardanne and Étang de Berre (30%), and about 70,000 hectares (170,000 acres) of agricultural land in the area (30%).

The section of the canal from Lac d'Esparron to Rians can carry up to 660,000,000 cubic metres (2.3×10^{10} cu ft) of water every year, with a maximum flow rate of 40 m^{3}/s (1,400 cu ft/s), which then splits up across the different branches of the canal system. The SCP puts into reserve about 250,000,000 cubic metres (8.8×10^{9} cu ft) of water a year, which is sufficient for up to two years of drought.

The Canal de Provence provides about 40% of the total water consumption in Marseille, with others supplied through the Canal de Marseille.

== See also ==
- Canal de Marseille
- Canal du Midi
