= Lac d'Esparron =

Reservoir in France

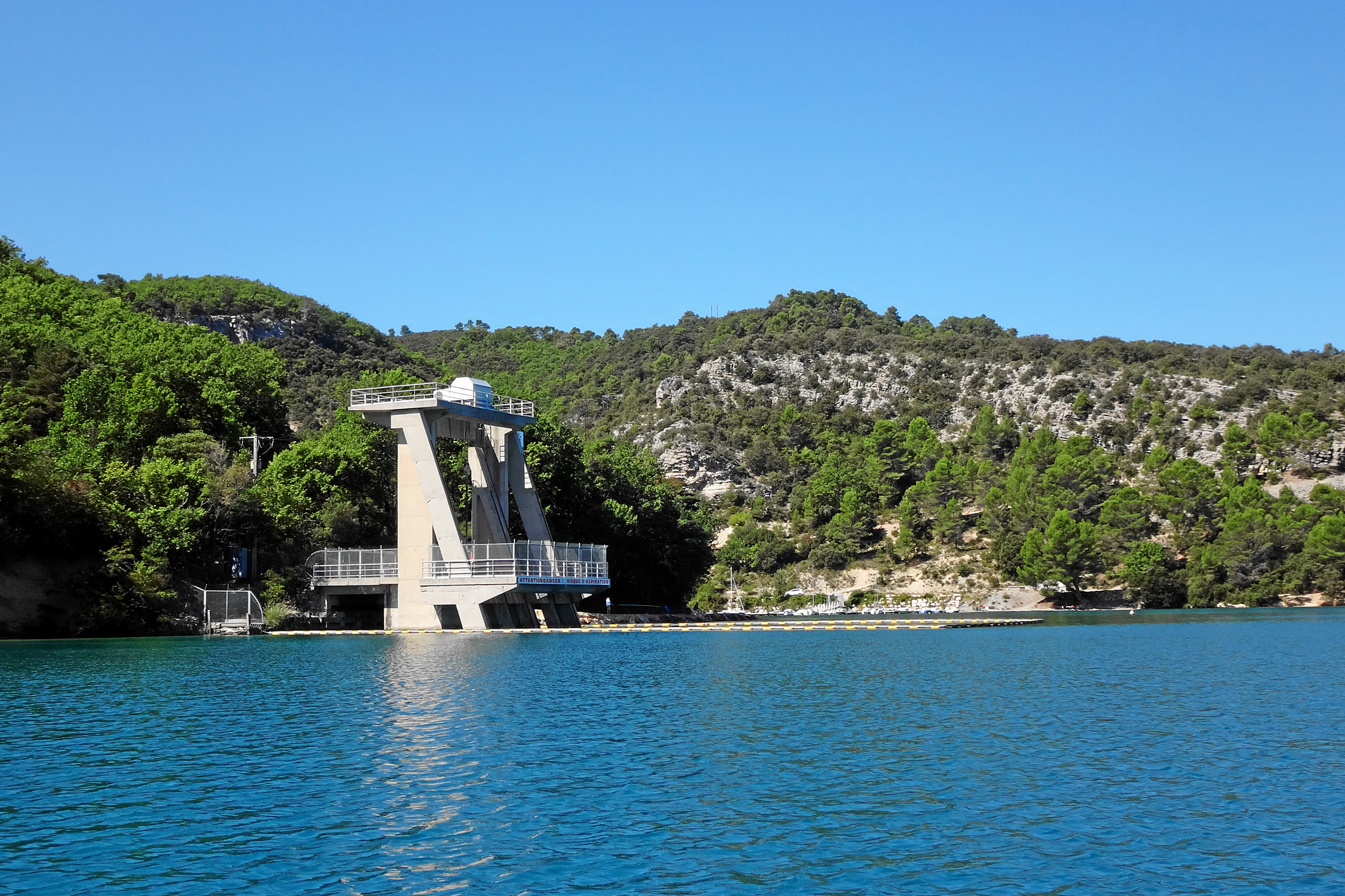

- Location within Provence-Alpes-Côte d'Azur
- Location: Alpes-de-Haute-Provence, Var
- Coordinates: 43°44′N 5°58′E
- Type: Artificial
- Primary inflows: Verdon
- Primary outflows: Verdon
- Basin countries: France
- Surface area: 3.28 km^{2} (1.27 sq mi)
- Max. depth: 55 m (180 ft)
- Water volume: 80,000,000 m^{3} (2.8×10^{9} cu ft)
- Surface elevation: 359 m (1,178 ft)
- Settlements: Esparron-de-Verdon

The Lac d'Esparron (French pronunciation: [lak dɛspaʁɔ̃]; English: Lake of Esparron) is an artificial reservoir on the departmental border between Alpes-de-Haute-Provence and Var, Southeastern France. It was filled in 1967 following the construction of the hydroelectric dam in Gréoux on the course of the Verdon River. It is located near the village of Esparron-de-Verdon in the Provence-Alpes-Côte d'Azur region, south of Saint-Martin-de-Brômes.

== Situation ==
The lake is the last of five reservoirs established on the Verdon since 1963; of these, it is the third-largest by surface area after the lakes of Sainte-Croix and Castillon. Its creation flooded the entire plain under Esparron-de-Verdon, as well as raised the level of the river for 8 kilometres (4.9 miles) upstream from the lake. This had the consequence of cutting the old road leading to Saint-Julien in the Var department and engulfing the bridge, the sole building drowned at the bottom of the lake.

The maximum depth of 55 m (180 ft) is measured directly above the dam.

The Lake of Esparron is an important summer tourism centre, frequented for water recreation and for fishing. As on all the waters of the Verdon, the use of petrol motor boats is prohibited; electric boats and sailing are permitted.

The remains of the old Verdon canal are on the shore facing the village of Esparron-de-Verdon. On the same shore, near the St Julien beach, is the first of two imposing water intakes that help feed the Canal de Provence. The water then passes through the Galerie des Maurras and other open galleries and canals to reach the Canal de Provence near Rians, Var.

== Gallery ==
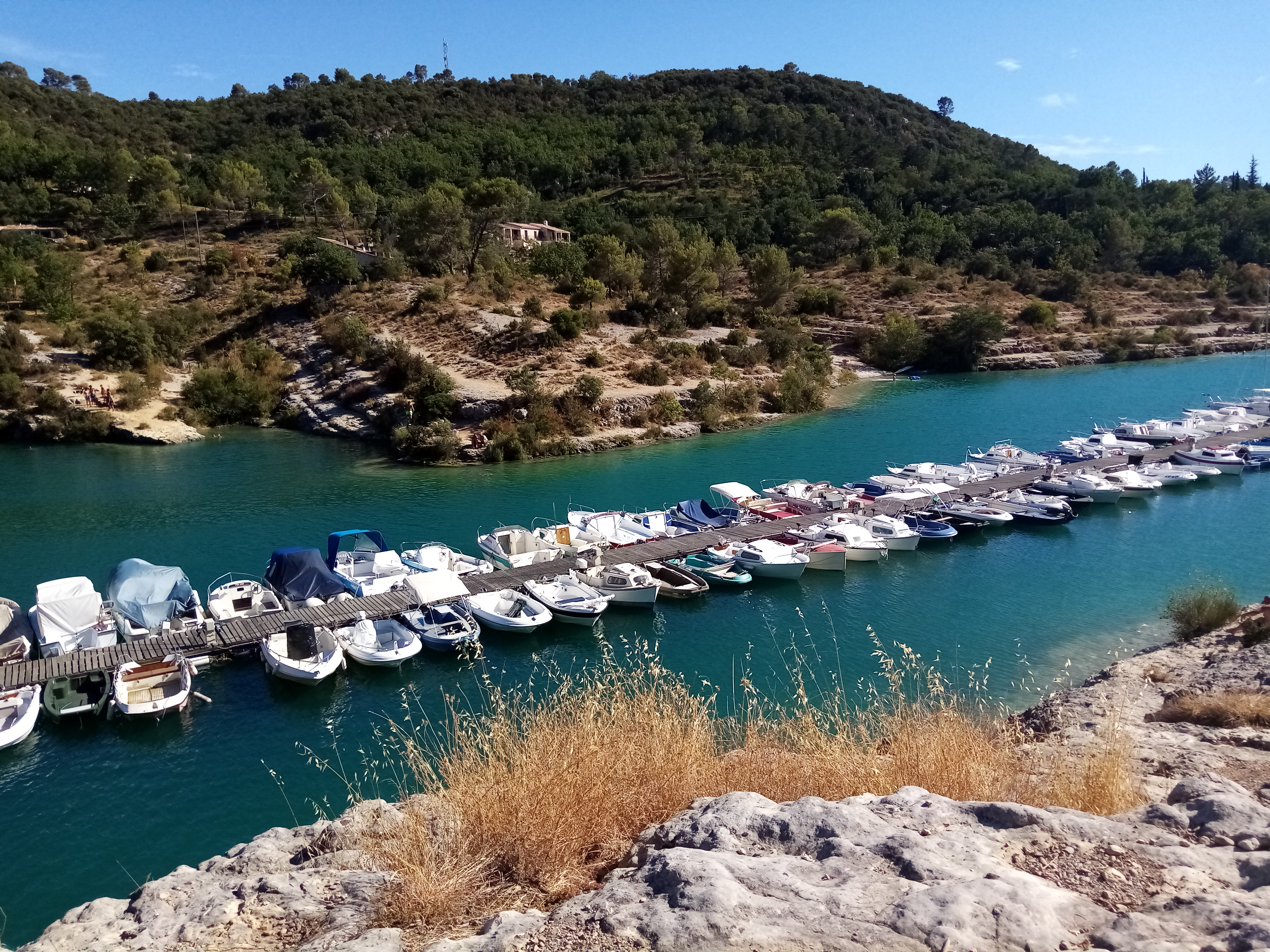
Marina

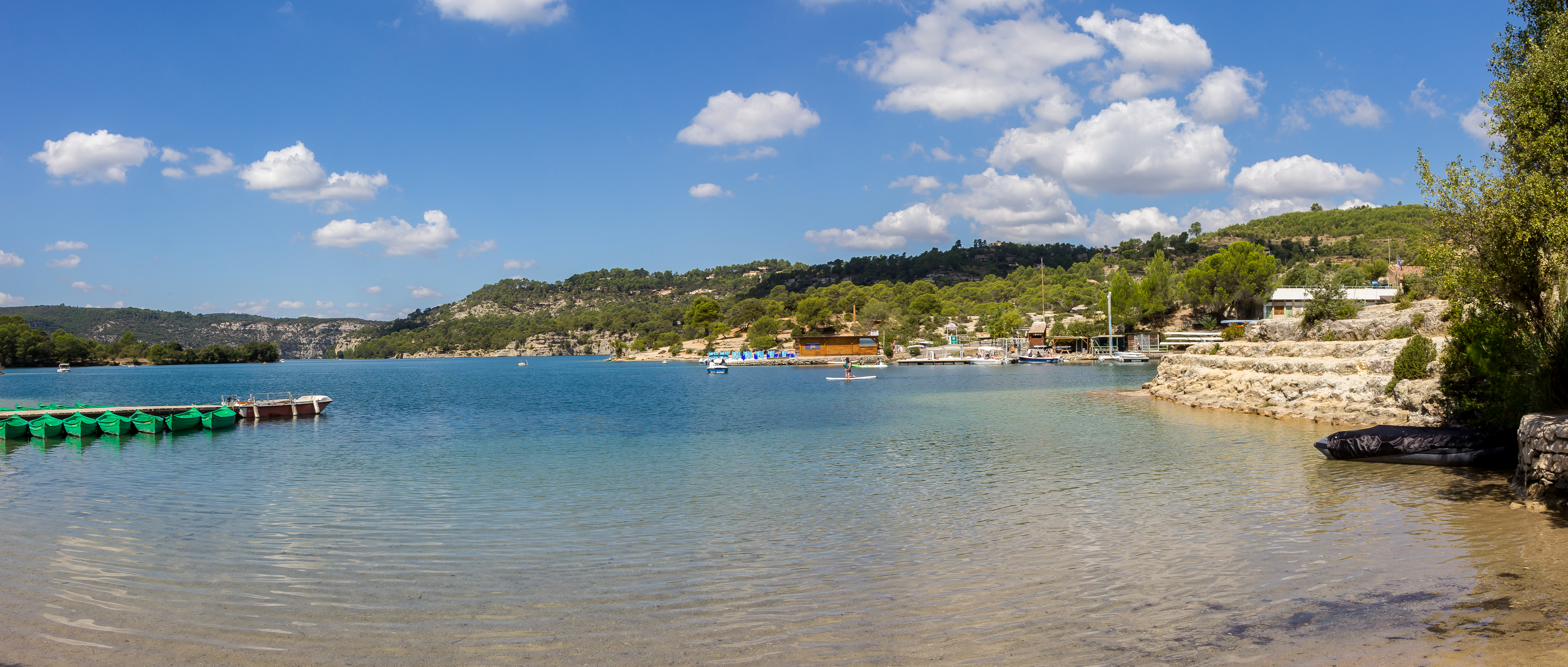
General view

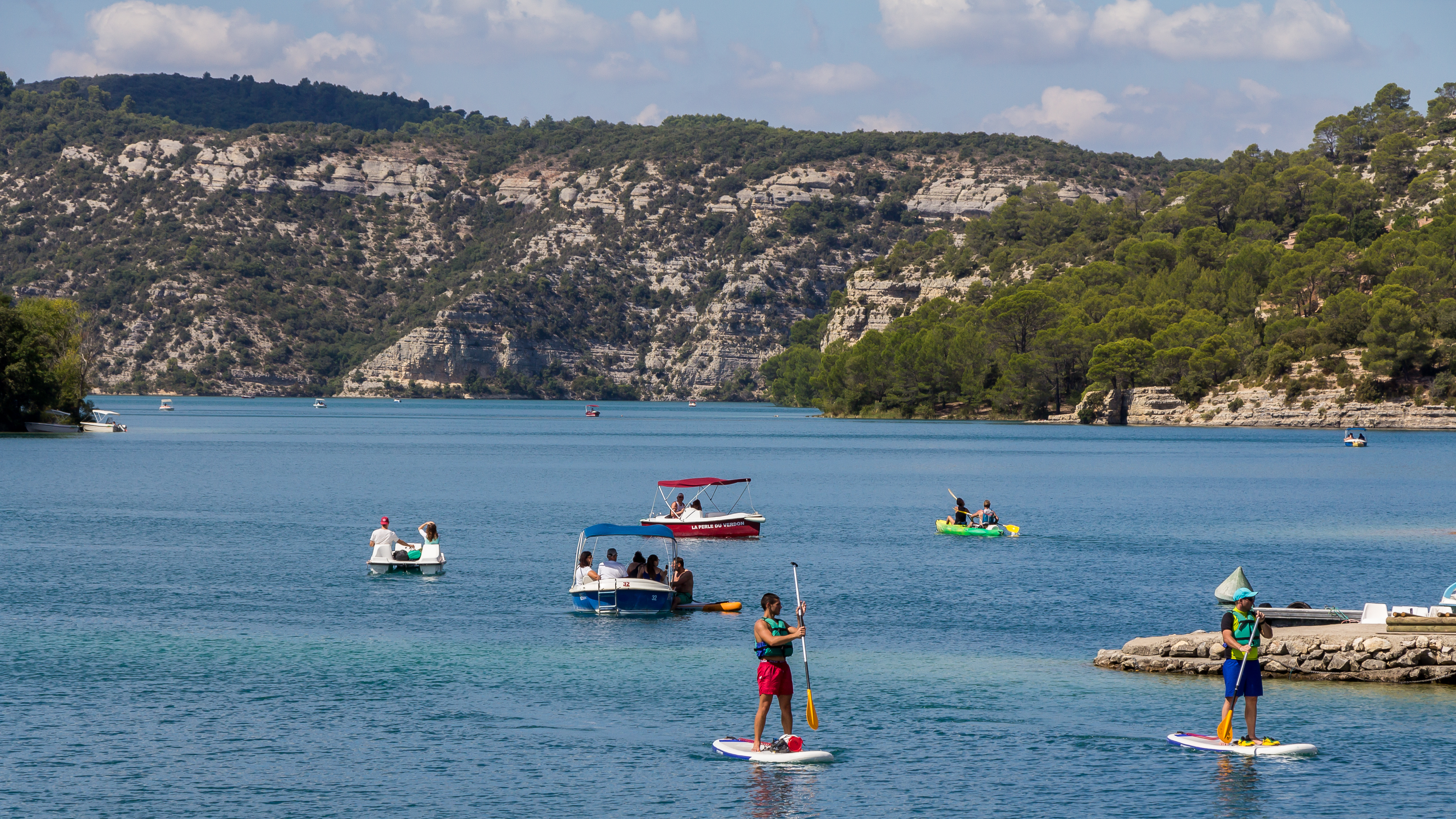
Summer activities
