= Arrondissement of Brignoles =

Coordinates: 43°25′N 6°03′E

Brignoles
- Arrondissement
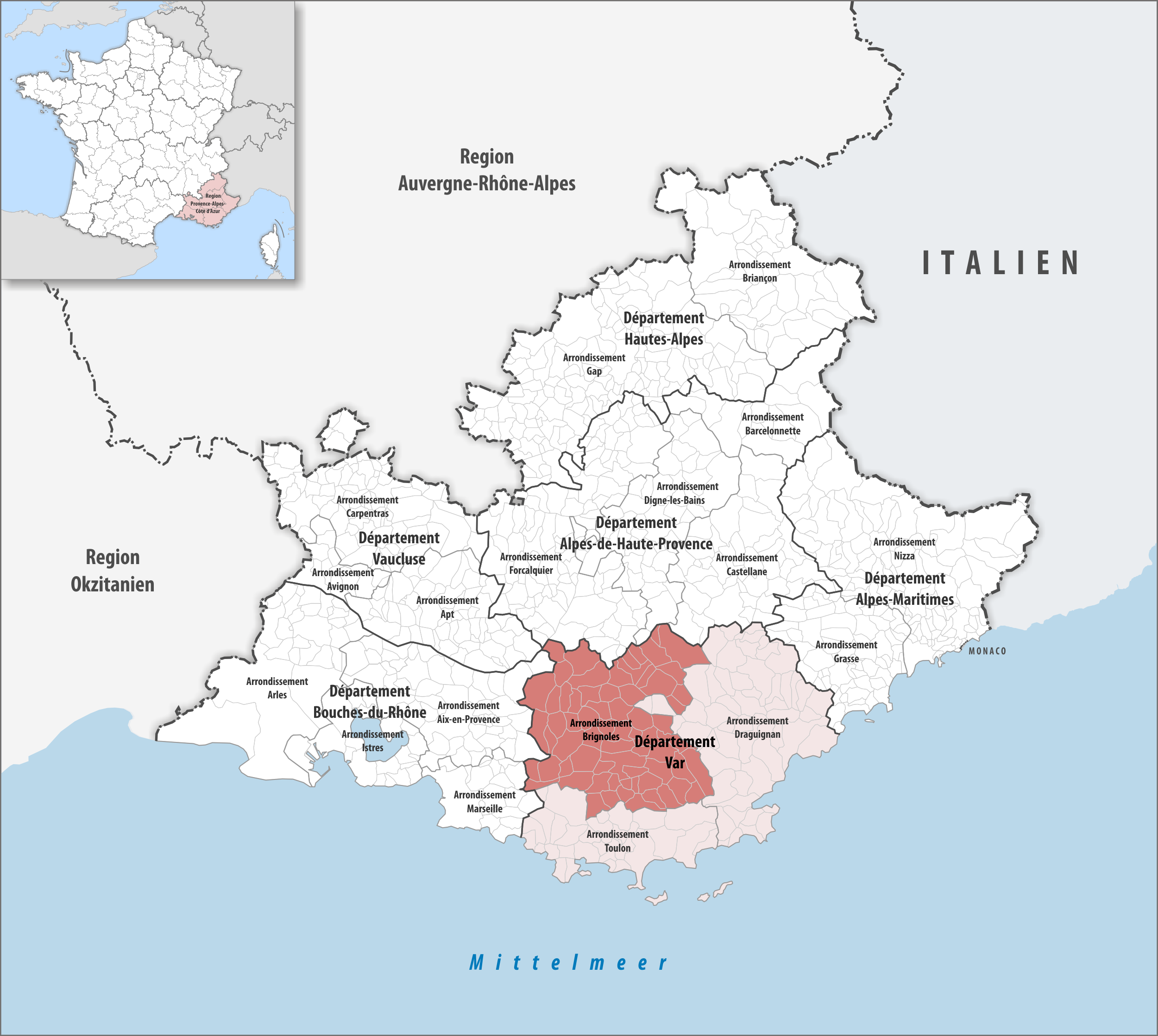
- Location within the region Provence-Alpes-Côte d'Azur
- Country: France
- Region: Provence-Alpes-Côte d'Azur
- Department: Var
- No. of communes: {{{nbcomm}}}
- Area: 2,518.3 km^{2} (972.3 sq mi)
- Population (2023): 193,842
  - Density: 76.973/km^{2} (199.36/sq mi)
- INSEE code: 833

The arrondissement of Brignoles is an arrondissement of France in the Var department in the Provence-Alpes-Côte d'Azur region. It has 67 communes. Its population is 188,423 (2021), and its area is 2,518.3 km^{2} (972.3 sq mi).

== Composition ==
The communes of the arrondissement of Brignoles, and their INSEE codes, are:

1. Aiguines (83002)
2. Artignosc-sur-Verdon (83005)
3. Artigues (83006)
4. Aups (83007)
5. Barjols (83012)
6. Baudinard-sur-Verdon (83014)
7. Bauduen (83015)
8. Besse-sur-Issole (83018)
9. Bras (83021)
10. Brignoles (83023)
11. Brue-Auriac (83025)
12. Cabasse (83026)
13. Camps-la-Source (83030)
14. Le Cannet-des-Maures (83031)
15. Carcès (83032)
16. Carnoules (83033)
17. La Celle (83037)
18. Châteauvert (83039)
19. Correns (83045)
20. Cotignac (83046)
21. Entrecasteaux (83051)
22. Esparron-de-Pallières (83052)
23. Flassans-sur-Issole (83057)
24. Forcalqueiret (83059)
25. Fox-Amphoux (83060)
26. Garéoult (83064)
27. Ginasservis (83066)
28. Gonfaron (83067)
29. Le Luc (83073)
30. Les Mayons (83075)
31. Mazaugues (83076)
32. Méounes-lès-Montrieux (83077)
33. Moissac-Bellevue (83078)
34. Montfort-sur-Argens (83083)
35. Montmeyan (83084)
36. Nans-les-Pins (83087)
37. Néoules (83088)
38. Ollières (83089)
39. Pignans (83092)
40. Plan-d'Aups-Sainte-Baume (83093)
41. Pontevès (83095)
42. Pourcieux (83096)
43. Pourrières (83097)
44. Puget-Ville (83100)
45. Régusse (83102)
46. Rians (83104)
47. Rocbaron (83106)
48. La Roquebrussanne (83108)
49. Rougiers (83110)
50. Sainte-Anastasie-sur-Issole (83111)
51. Saint-Julien (83113)
52. Saint-Martin-de-Pallières (83114)
53. Saint-Maximin-la-Sainte-Baume (83116)
54. Saint-Zacharie (83120)
55. Les Salles-sur-Verdon (83122)
56. Seillons-Source-d'Argens (83125)
57. Tavernes (83135)
58. Le Thoronet (83136)
59. Tourtour (83139)
60. Tourves (83140)
61. Le Val (83143)
62. Varages (83145)
63. La Verdière (83146)
64. Vérignon (83147)
65. Villecroze (83149)
66. Vinon-sur-Verdon (83150)
67. Vins-sur-Caramy (83151)

== History ==
The arrondissement of Brignoles was created in 1800, disbanded in 1926 and restored in 1974. At the January 2017 reorganisation of the arrondissements of Var, it received six communes from the arrondissement of Draguignan and two communes from the arrondissement of Toulon, and it lost two communes to the arrondissement of Draguignan.

As a result of the reorganisation of the cantons of France which came into effect in 2015, the borders of the cantons are no longer related to the borders of the arrondissements. The cantons of the arrondissement of Brignoles were, as of January 2015:

1. Aups
2. Barjols
3. Besse-sur-Issole
4. Brignoles
5. Cotignac
6. Rians
7. La Roquebrussanne
8. Saint-Maximin-la-Sainte-Baume
9. Tavernes
