= Kobe (artist) =

Belgian visual artist and sculptor

- (Jacques Saelens)
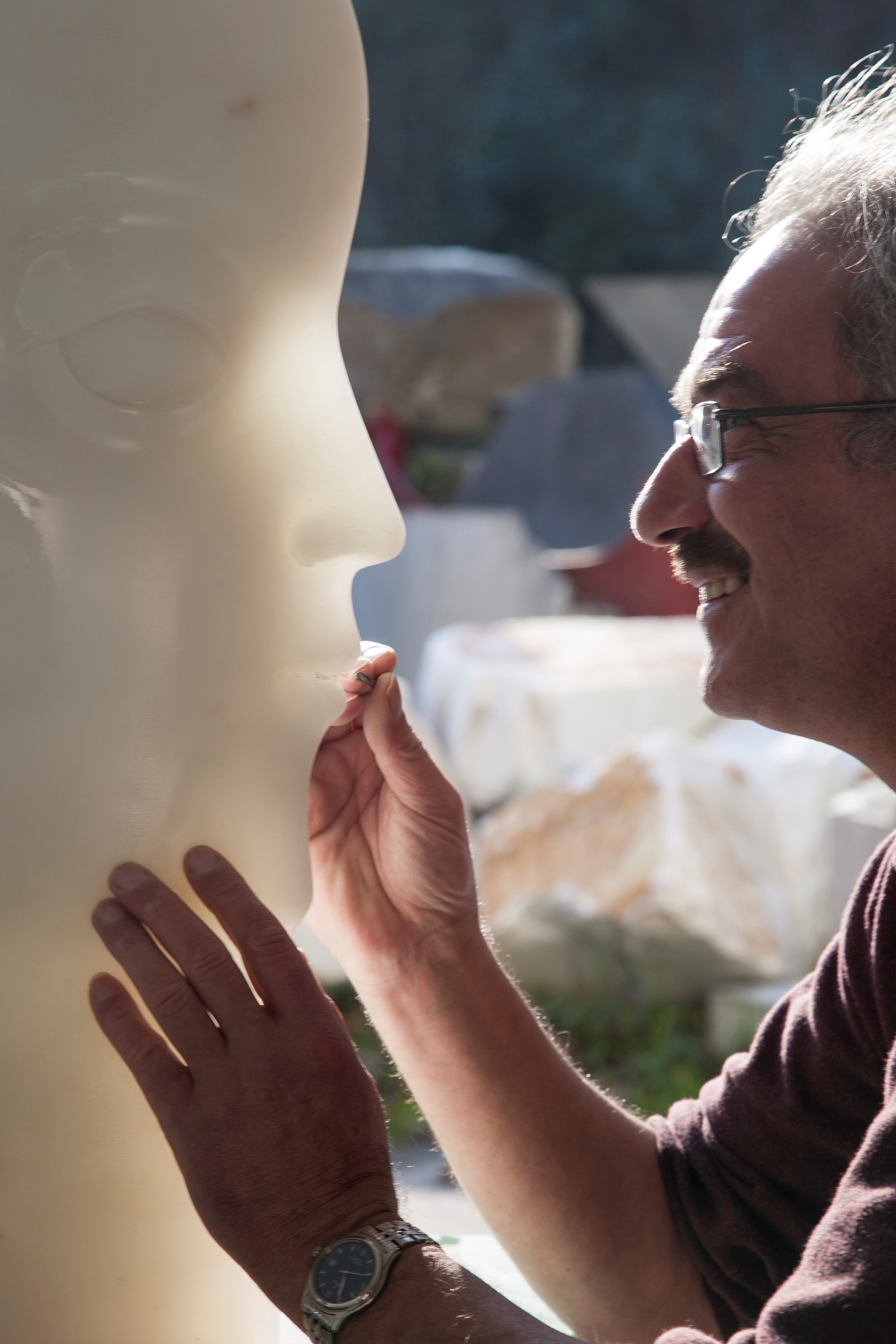
- Kobe (2006)
- Born: 4 September 1950; Kortrijk, Belgium
- Died: 26 October 2014 (aged 64); Saint-Julien, Var, France
- Website: https://www.kobeartist.com/

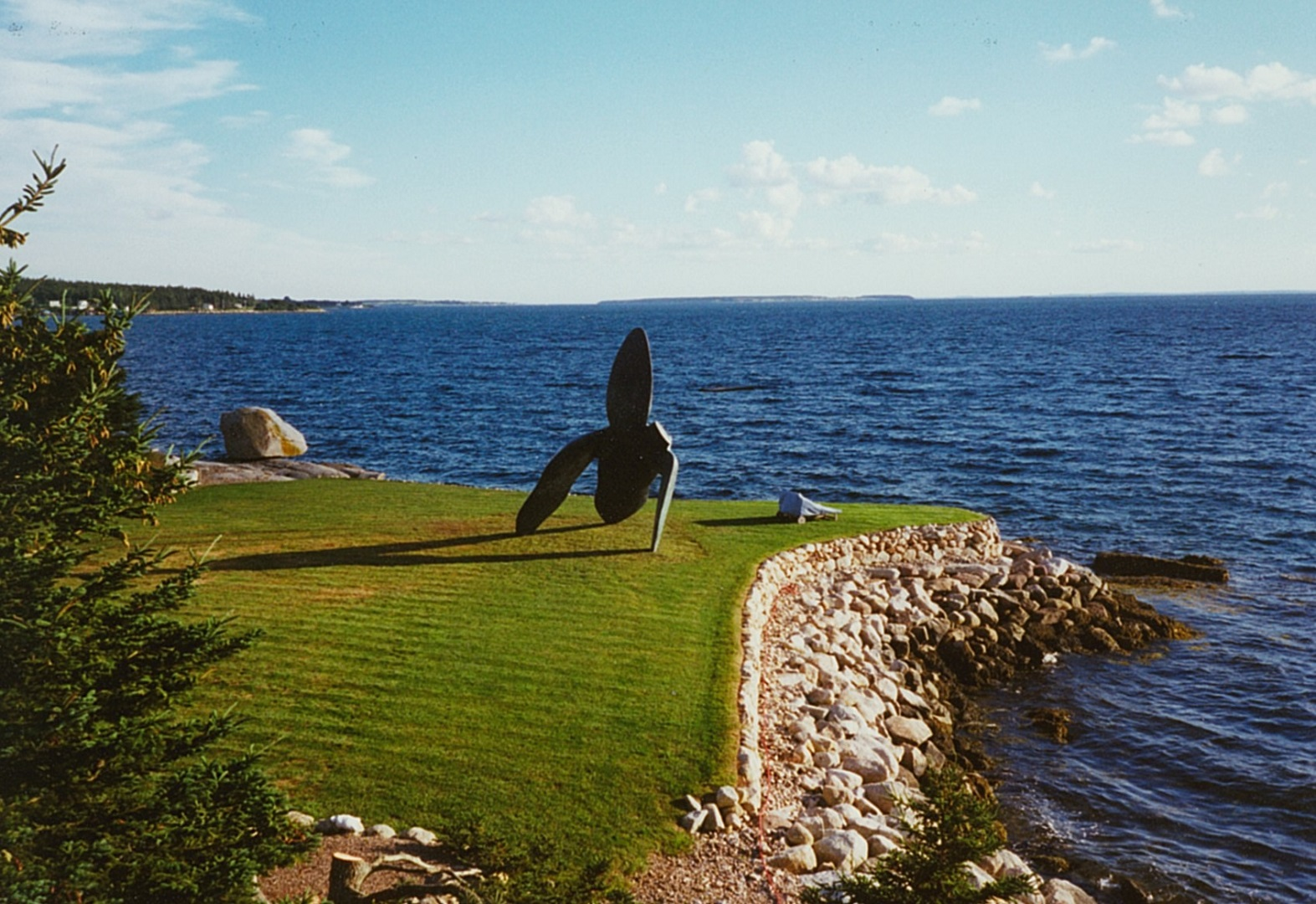
Arcade, 1999, Bronze – Blandford, Nova Scotia, Canada – 670 x 630 x 440 cm – Private collection

Kobe (pseudonym of Jacques Saelens, (Kortrijk, Belgium 4 September 1950 – Saint-Julien, Var, France, 26 October 2014) was a Belgian visual artist and sculptor.

== Early life ==
Kobe studied in Belgium, at LUCA School of Arts in Schaerbeek (1969–1974) and the Academy of Fine Arts in Kortrijk (1969–1977), where he discovered the importance of drawing for a sculptor. At the age of 25 he travelled for one year to Central America and South America, where he was greatly taken by the ample forms of generously endowed local matrons.

His artistic vision was further shaped by many travels in Africa and Asia, where he observed the ancient sculptures. Professionally he was a teacher of sculpture at the Academies of Kortrijk, Deinze and Harelbeke. Around 1992 Kobe started experimenting with flat shapes, which led to a typical style of wide and thin sculptures.

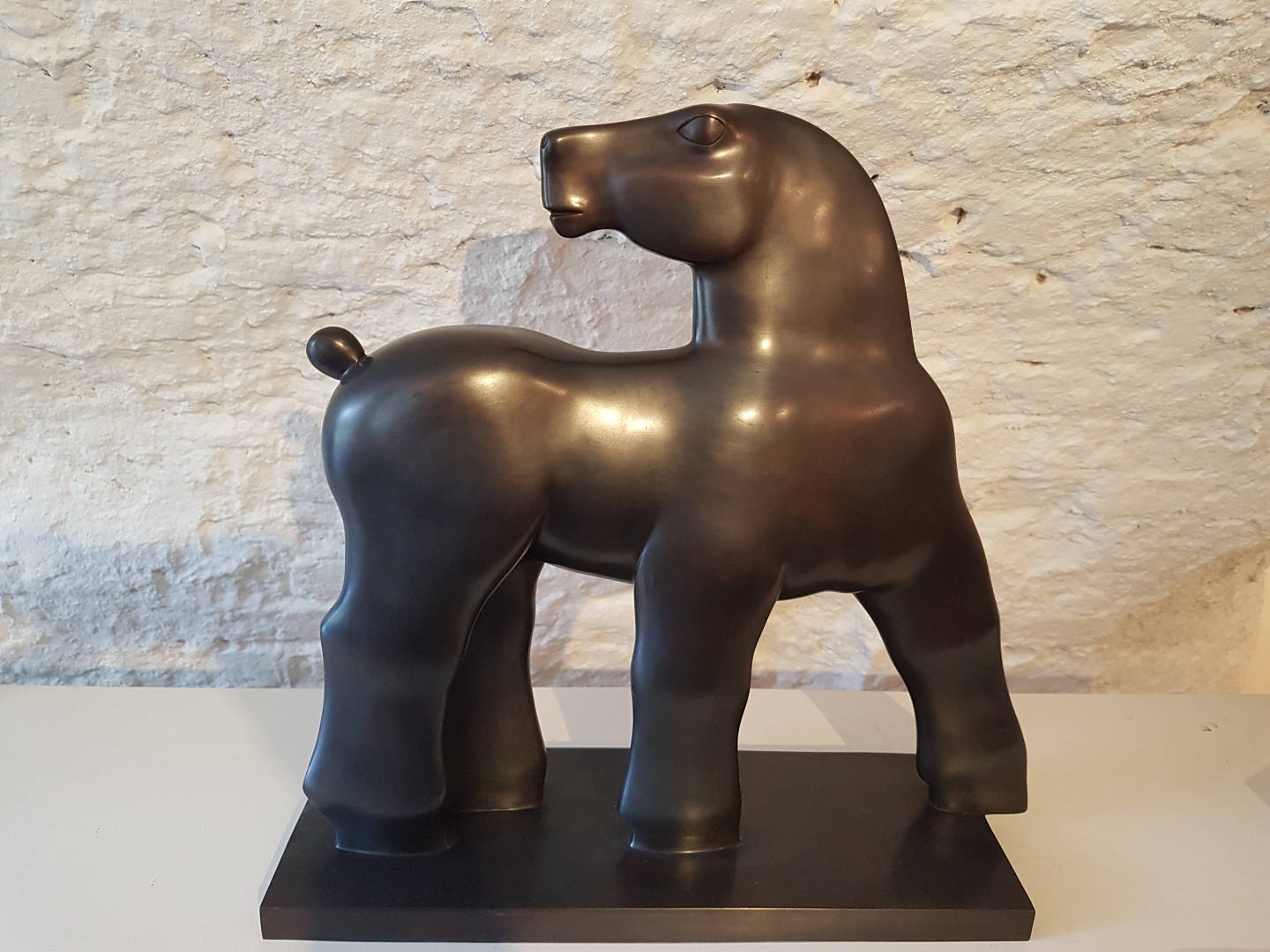
In Al Zijn Glorie (In All His Glory), 2011, in bronze - 51 x 53 x 17,5 cm

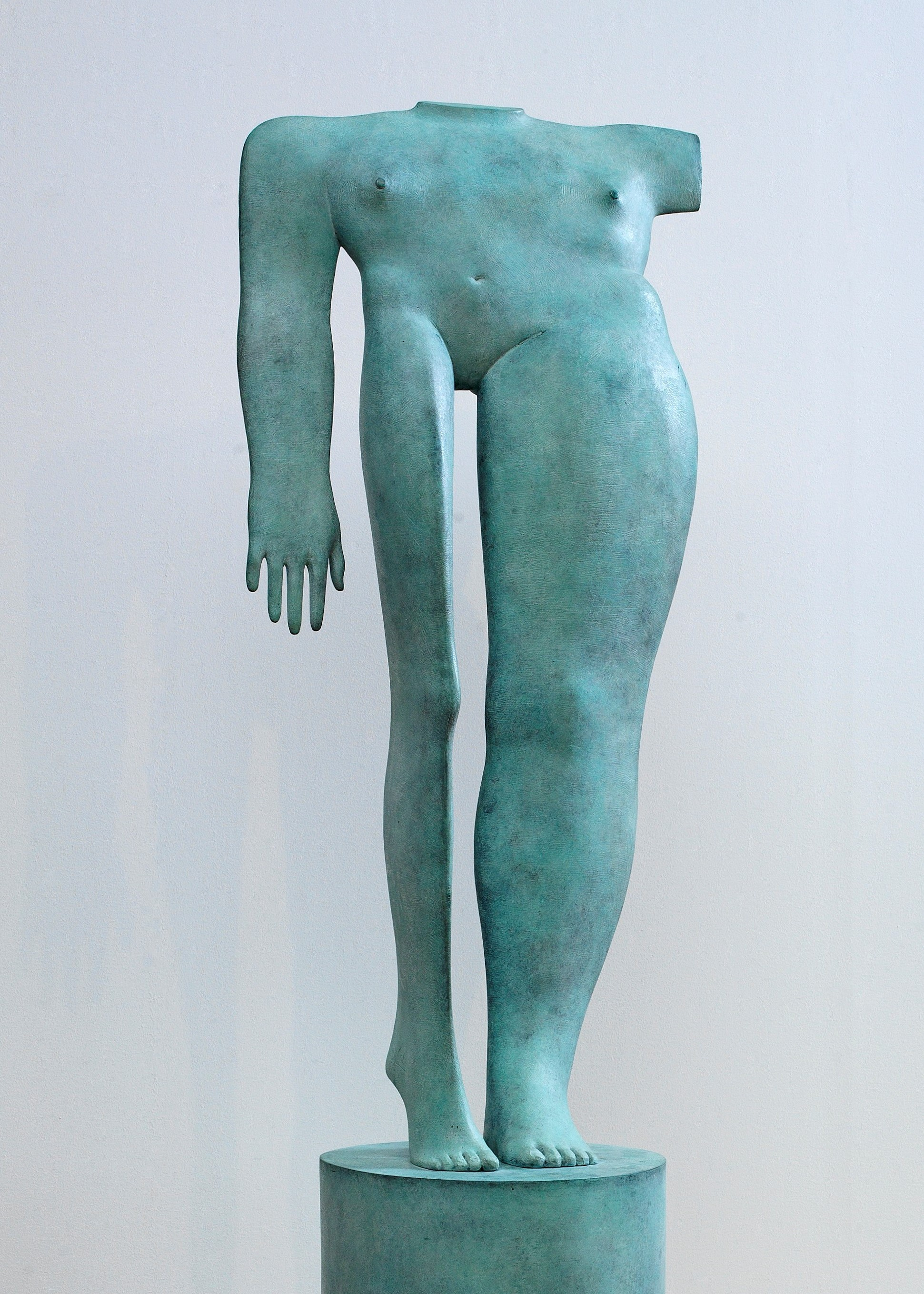
Grande Torse Debout (Large Standing Torso), 1999, bronze – 160 x 48 x 20 cm (base 60 x 30 cm) – Beeldengalerij Het Depot (museum)

== Career ==
In 1995 he became an independent sculptor and worked in Pietrasanta (Tuscany, Italy) close to the many bronze foundries and the marble quarries of Carrara.

== Artworks ==
In the morning Kobe would make sketches or drawings, which he then later elaborated into an artwork.

Kobe's artworks are mostly made in bronze and marble. Two subjects dominate his artworks: the female figure and the horse. Kobe’s female figures are maternal and human, be they fat or thin, and his horses symbols of strength, companionship and connection.

Kobe's most monumental artwork Arcade (670 x 630 x 440 cm) is in a private collection in Nova Scotia, Canada, close to the Atlantic Ocean. Other works of art can be found in museums and private collections, among which Beeldengalerij Het Depot and The Phoebus Foundation.

== Publications ==
- Ingenious Cheerful Simplicity (art catalogue – 1995 – hardcover – 57p. – NL/FR/EN/DT/IT) (published by Robinsons Art Gallery) (selection of Kobe's first sculptures)
- Herinneringen (Veertig Vlamingen en hun geliefkoosd kunstwerk) (in this book the entrepreneur and art collector Fernand Huts (owner of Katoen Natie) describes his choice for the bronze artwork The Great Captain)
- Playing with surfaces and forms (art catalogue – 2004 – hardcover – 48p. – NL) (published by MPV Gallery) (selection of Kobe's sculptures between 1996 and 2004)
- Kobe (DVD – 2008 – 33 min. – NL/EN subtitles) (published by MPV Gallery) (shows the work and life of Kobe)
- Becoming Kobe (art catalogue – 2010 – hardcover – 95p. – NL/EN) (published by MPV Gallery) (selection of Kobe's sculptures between 2002 and 2010)
- Het Depot Belicht (book published by Beeldengalerij Het Depot that shows their collection, in which a sculpture by Kobe is mentioned)
- Kobe – Ingenious Simplicity (monograph – 2016 – hardcover – 252p. – NL/EN/FR) (written by art critic Johan Debruyne and Albin Saelens) (monograph about the life of Kobe and most of his artworks)
- Masterpieces (art catalogue – 2018 – hardcover – 26p. – NL/FR/EN) (published by Robinsons Art Gallery) (selection of marble sculptures)
- Kunstmo(nu)menten (the bronze artwork De Grote Aanvoerder (The Great Captain) is mentioned in this book that takes the reader on an art route through Beveren)
