= Artigues, Var =

Artigues
- Commune
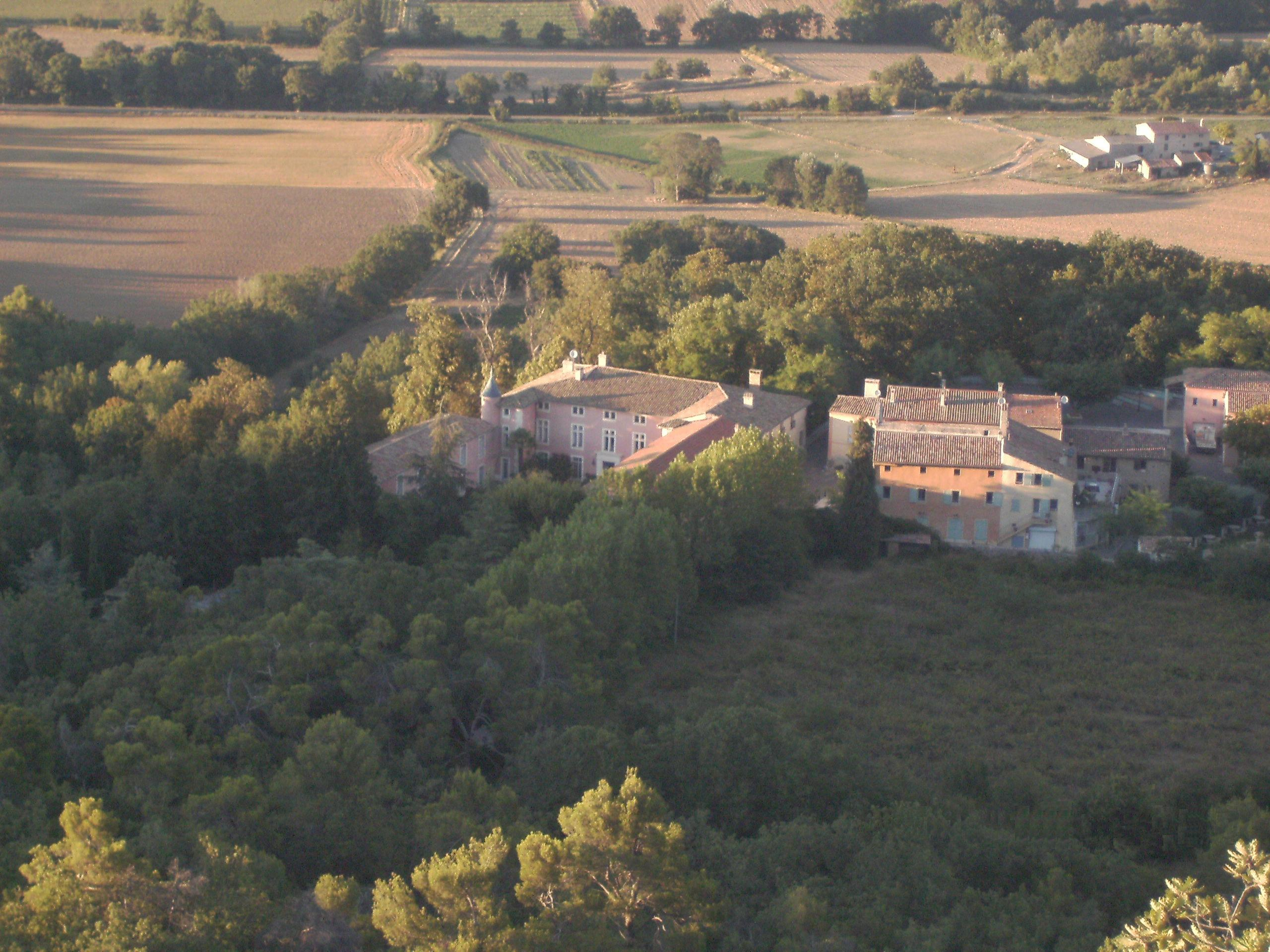
- A general view of the village

- Coat of arms
- Location of Artigues
- Location within France Location within Provence-Alpes-Côte d'Azur
- Coordinates: 43°35′39″N 5°48′41″E
- Country: France
- Region: Provence-Alpes-Côte d'Azur
- Department: Var
- Arrondissement: Brignoles
- Canton: Saint-Maximin-la-Sainte-Baume
- Intercommunality: CC Provence Verdon

Government
  - Mayor (2020–2026): Yves Souque
- Area^{1}: 31.85 km^{2} (12.30 sq mi)
- Elevation: 469 m (1,539 ft)
- Highest elevation: 641 m (2,103 ft)
- Lowest elevation: 351 m (1,152 ft)
- Population (2023): 282
  - Density: 8.85/km^{2} (22.9/sq mi)
- Time zone: UTC+01:00 (CET)
  - Summer (DST): UTC+02:00 (CEST)
- INSEE/Postal code: 83006 /83560
- ^{1} French Land Register data, which excludes lakes, ponds, glaciers > 1 km^{2} (0.386 sq mi or 247 acres) and river estuaries.

Artigues (French pronunciation: [aʁtiɡ]; Occitan: Artiga) is a commune in the Var department in the Provence-Alpes-Côte d'Azur region in southeastern France.

== See also ==
- Communes of the Var department
