= Brue-Auriac =

- Commune
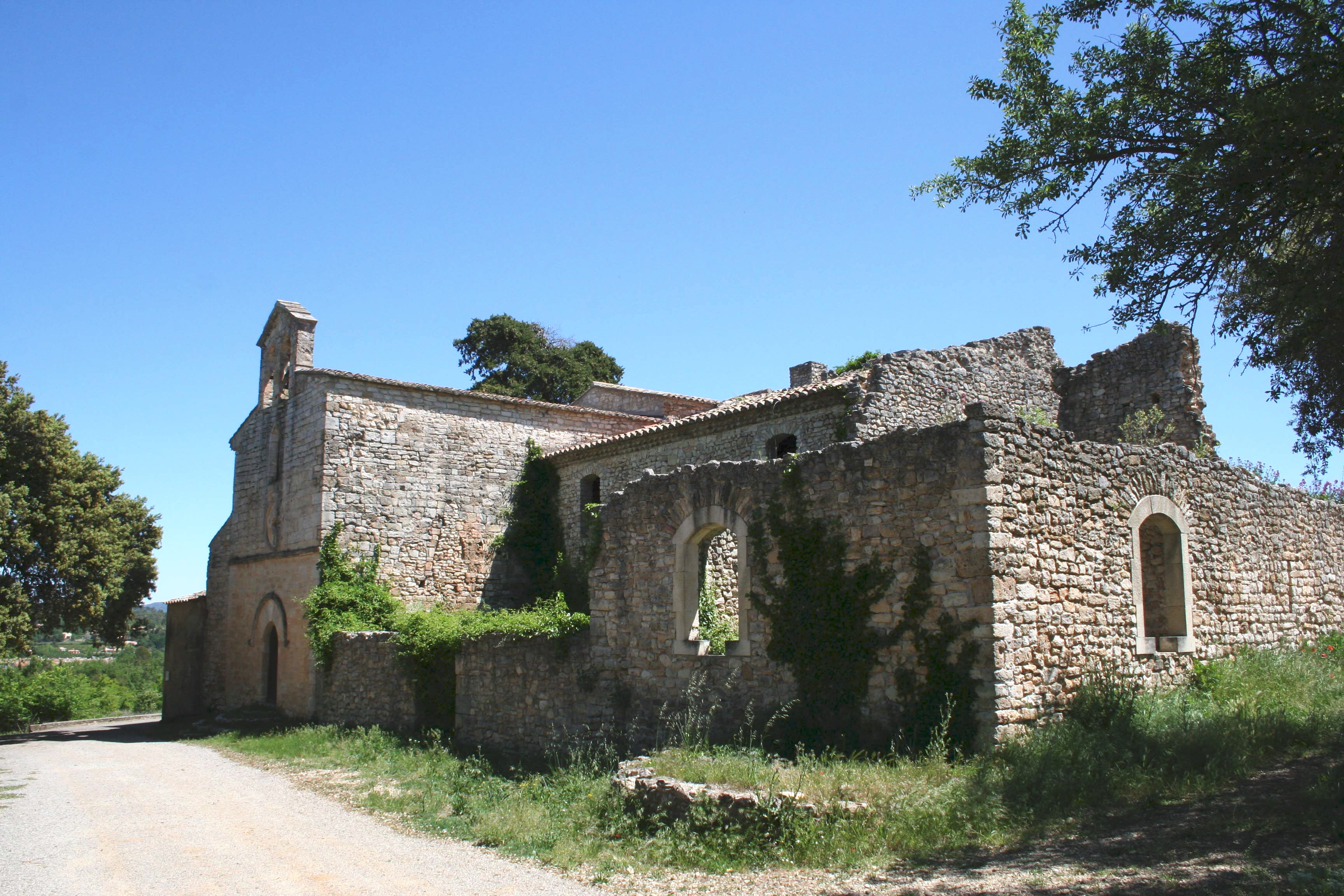
- The church of Our Lady, in Brue-Auriac

- Coat of arms
- Location of Brue-Auriac
- Location within France Location within Provence-Alpes-Côte d'Azur
- Coordinates: 43°31′42″N 5°56′43″E
- Country: France
- Region: Provence-Alpes-Côte d'Azur
- Department: Var
- Arrondissement: Brignoles
- Canton: Saint-Maximin-la-Sainte-Baume

Government
  - Mayor (2020–2026): Dominique Richard
- Area^{1}: 36.73 km^{2} (14.18 sq mi)
- Elevation: 254 m (833 ft)
- Highest elevation: 466 m (1,529 ft)
- Lowest elevation: 199 m (653 ft)
- Population (2023): 1,463
  - Density: 39.83/km^{2} (103.2/sq mi)
- Time zone: UTC+01:00 (CET)
  - Summer (DST): UTC+02:00 (CEST)
- INSEE/Postal code: 83025 /83119
- ^{1} French Land Register data, which excludes lakes, ponds, glaciers > 1 km^{2} (0.386 sq mi or 247 acres) and river estuaries.

Brue-Auriac (French pronunciation: [bʁy oʁjak]; Occitan: Brua e Auriac) is a commune in the Var department in the Provence-Alpes-Côte d'Azur region in southeastern France. It is an unusual village, having been created in the 18th century by the union of two decayed villages by the seigneur Georges Roux de Corse.

== History ==
George Roux was born in Corsica in 1703, went to Martinique as a young man, and established himself in Marseille as a trader with the West Indies in 1727. He carried on this trade successfully for forty years, including the trade in African slaves. In 1730 he helped to introduce coffee to France and to make Marseille the place where coffee was traded throughout the Mediterranean. As a Marseille city official (échevin) he tried to make the city's finances more healthy. He was ennobled in 1750 as the marquis de Brue and became a conseiller d'État in 1765. The loss of three fleets of ships he owned in the Seven Years' War began his fall, although the commercial brokers who seized his goods, including the lands at Brue, themselves went bankrupt in 1774. He died in Brue, ruined, in 1792.

His redevelopment of Brue-Auriac between 1746 and 1758 resulted in a small town which by 1765 had 832 inhabitants engaged in various industries such as silk, faience, cloth, tile works, and tanning, and despite the failure of Roux de Corse the regular planning of the town can still be appreciated. It was a closed economic truck system in which cash was replaced by tokens such as leather buttons with his portrait.

Just outside the village is a remarkable pigeonnier, a cylindrical tower 22.50 metres high and more than 12 metres in diameter, erected about 1750 by Roux de Corse to provide fresh food for the inhabitants. There is also a 12th-century chapel outside the village, once a priory, and still the communal cemetery. In the village are a large five-bayed château in the style of an overgrown villa and the remains of a chapel, both erected by Roux de Corse, and a church of 1914, replacing an earlier one of the mid 19th century. The front of the château is now a number of private dwellings, the rear the mairie.

== See also ==
- Communes of the Var department
