= Varages =

- Commune
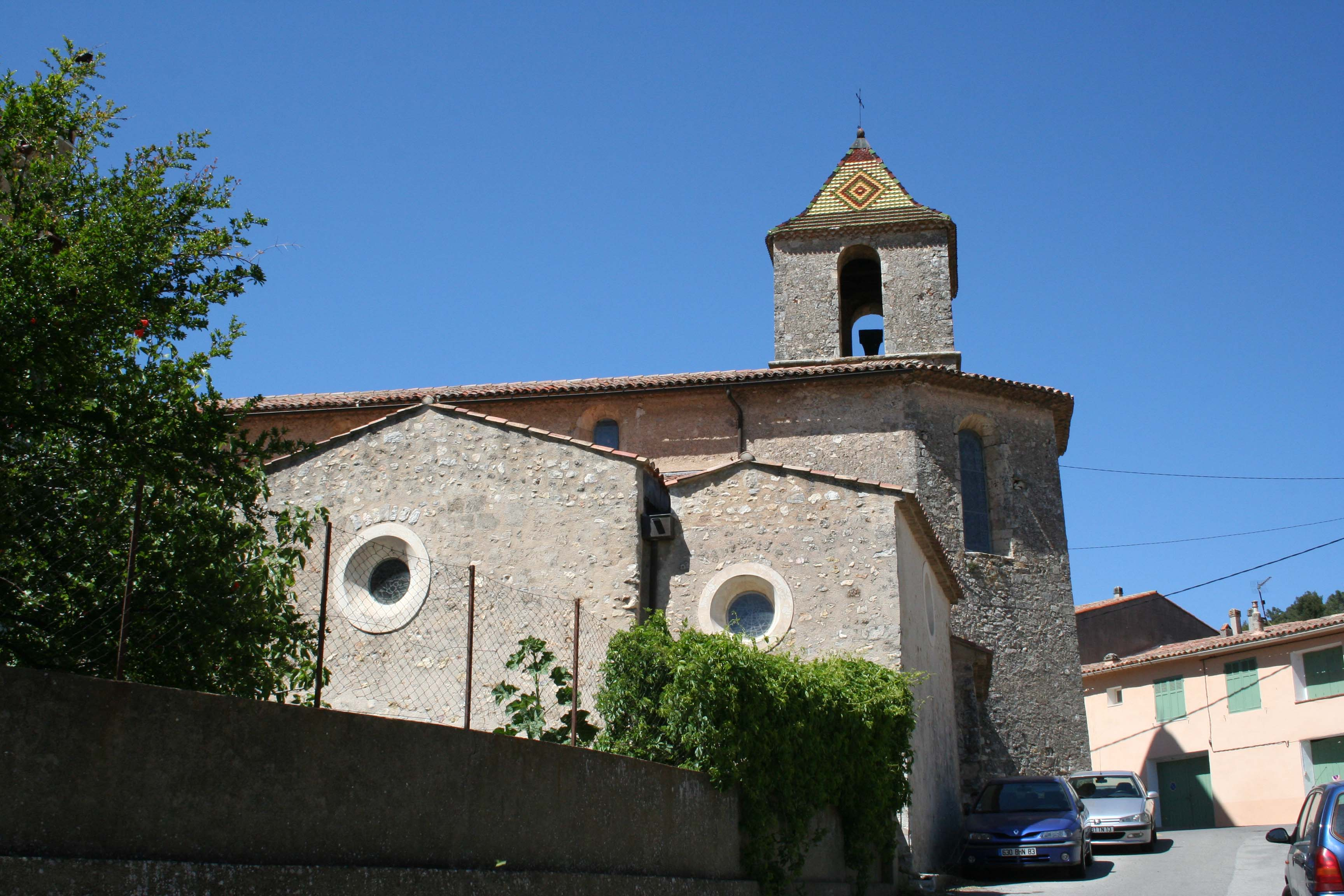
- The church of Our Lady of Nazareth

- Coat of arms
- Location of Varages
- Location within France Location within Provence-Alpes-Côte d'Azur
- Coordinates: 43°35′54″N 5°57′39″E
- Country: France
- Region: Provence-Alpes-Côte d'Azur
- Department: Var
- Arrondissement: Brignoles
- Canton: Saint-Maximin-la-Sainte-Baume

Government
  - Mayor (2020–2026): Guy Partage
- Area^{1}: 35.11 km^{2} (13.56 sq mi)
- Elevation: 304 m (997 ft)
- Highest elevation: 573 m (1,880 ft)
- Lowest elevation: 259 m (850 ft)
- Population (2023): 1,177
  - Density: 33.52/km^{2} (86.82/sq mi)
- Time zone: UTC+01:00 (CET)
  - Summer (DST): UTC+02:00 (CEST)
- INSEE/Postal code: 83145 /83670
- ^{1} French Land Register data, which excludes lakes, ponds, glaciers > 1 km^{2} (0.386 sq mi or 247 acres) and river estuaries.

Varages (French pronunciation: [vaʁaʒ]; Occitan: Varatge) is a commune in the Var department in the Provence-Alpes-Côte d'Azur region in southeastern France.

It is known for its vineyards and ceramic dinnerware.

== Geography ==
=== Climate ===
Varages has a hot-summer Mediterranean climate (Köppen climate classification Csa). The average annual temperature in Varages is 14.3 °C (57.7 °F). The average annual rainfall is 786.8 mm (30.98 in) with November as the wettest month. The temperatures are highest on average in July, at around 24.0 °C (75.2 °F), and lowest in January, at around 6.1 °C (43.0 °F). The highest temperature ever recorded in Varages was 44.5 °C (112.1 °F) on 28 June 2019; the coldest temperature ever recorded was −12.5 °C (9.5 °F) on 2 March 2005.

Climate data for Varages (1991−2020 normals, extremes 1988−present)
Month	Jan	Feb	Mar	Apr	May	Jun	Jul	Aug	Sep	Oct	Nov	Dec	Year
Record high °C (°F)	22.4 (72.3)	23.5 (74.3)	28.0 (82.4)	30.7 (87.3)	33.9 (93.0)	44.5 (112.1)	40.4 (104.7)	42.1 (107.8)	35.4 (95.7)	31.8 (89.2)	24.6 (76.3)	23.3 (73.9)	44.5 (112.1)
Mean daily maximum °C (°F)	11.1 (52.0)	12.7 (54.9)	16.6 (61.9)	19.5 (67.1)	23.9 (75.0)	28.7 (83.7)	32.0 (89.6)	31.9 (89.4)	26.2 (79.2)	20.6 (69.1)	14.7 (58.5)	11.3 (52.3)	20.8 (69.4)
Daily mean °C (°F)	6.1 (43.0)	6.7 (44.1)	10.0 (50.0)	12.7 (54.9)	17.0 (62.6)	21.4 (70.5)	24.0 (75.2)	23.7 (74.7)	19.1 (66.4)	14.9 (58.8)	9.7 (49.5)	6.5 (43.7)	14.3 (57.7)
Mean daily minimum °C (°F)	1.0 (33.8)	0.7 (33.3)	3.4 (38.1)	5.9 (42.6)	10.1 (50.2)	14.1 (57.4)	16.0 (60.8)	15.6 (60.1)	12.0 (53.6)	9.2 (48.6)	4.7 (40.5)	1.7 (35.1)	7.9 (46.2)
Record low °C (°F)	−9.2 (15.4)	−10.6 (12.9)	−12.5 (9.5)	−5.3 (22.5)	0.3 (32.5)	5.4 (41.7)	8.4 (47.1)	7.6 (45.7)	2.9 (37.2)	−4.2 (24.4)	−7.9 (17.8)	−9.1 (15.6)	−12.5 (9.5)
Average precipitation mm (inches)	60.5 (2.38)	42.2 (1.66)	45.0 (1.77)	75.1 (2.96)	73.3 (2.89)	55.4 (2.18)	28.3 (1.11)	37.9 (1.49)	90.9 (3.58)	96.0 (3.78)	118.0 (4.65)	64.2 (2.53)	786.8 (30.98)
Average precipitation days (≥ 1.0 mm)	5.8	5.5	5.7	7.6	6.5	4.6	2.8	3.7	5.5	6.9	8.5	6.7	69.9
Source: Météo-France

== See also ==
- Communes of the Var department
