= Bras, Var =

Bras
- Commune
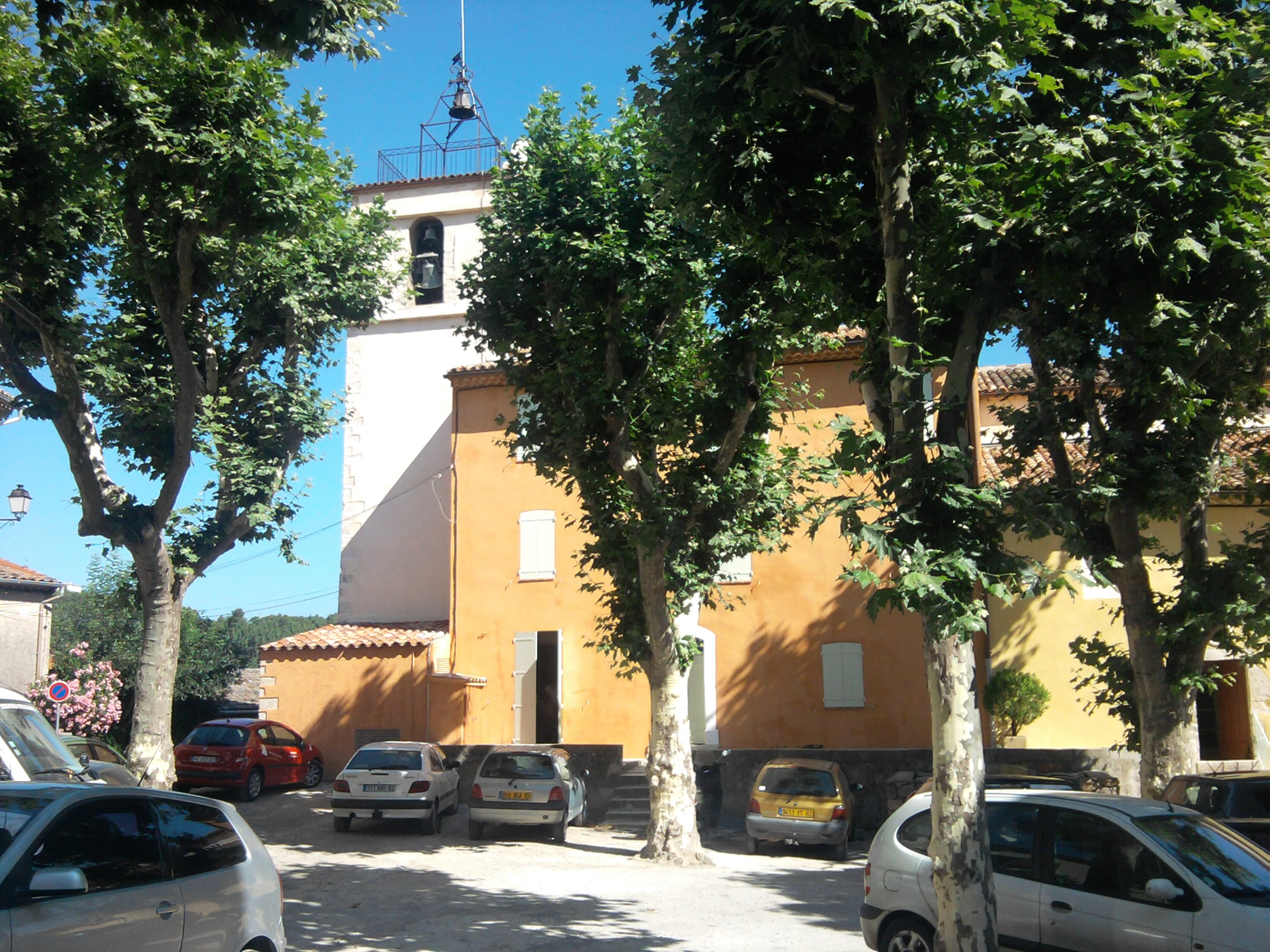
- The church in Bras

- Coat of arms
- Location of Bras
- Location within France Location within Provence-Alpes-Côte d'Azur
- Coordinates: 43°28′23″N 5°57′16″E
- Country: France
- Region: Provence-Alpes-Côte d'Azur
- Department: Var
- Arrondissement: Brignoles
- Canton: Saint-Maximin-la-Sainte-Baume
- Intercommunality: CA Provence Verte

Government
  - Mayor (2020–2026): Franck Pero
- Area^{1}: 34.93 km^{2} (13.49 sq mi)
- Elevation: 315 m (1,033 ft)
- Highest elevation: 580 m (1,900 ft)
- Lowest elevation: 233 m (764 ft)
- Population (2023): 2,637
  - Density: 75.49/km^{2} (195.5/sq mi)
- Time zone: UTC+01:00 (CET)
  - Summer (DST): UTC+02:00 (CEST)
- INSEE/Postal code: 83021 /83149
- ^{1} French Land Register data, which excludes lakes, ponds, glaciers > 1 km^{2} (0.386 sq mi or 247 acres) and river estuaries.

Bras (Occitan: Braç) is a commune in the Var department in the Provence-Alpes-Côte d'Azur region in southeastern France.

== Population ==
Historical population
| Year | Pop. | ±% p.a. |
|---|---|---|
| 1968 | 601 | — |
| 1975 | 638 | +0.86% |
| 1982 | 677 | +0.85% |
| 1990 | 1,056 | +5.71% |
| 1999 | 1,298 | +2.32% |
| 2007 | 2,138 | +6.44% |
| 2012 | 2,543 | +3.53% |
| 2017 | 2,698 | +1.19% |
| 2023 | 2,637 | −0.38% |
Source: INSEE

== See also ==
- Communes of the Var department
