= Esparron-de-Pallières =

- Commune
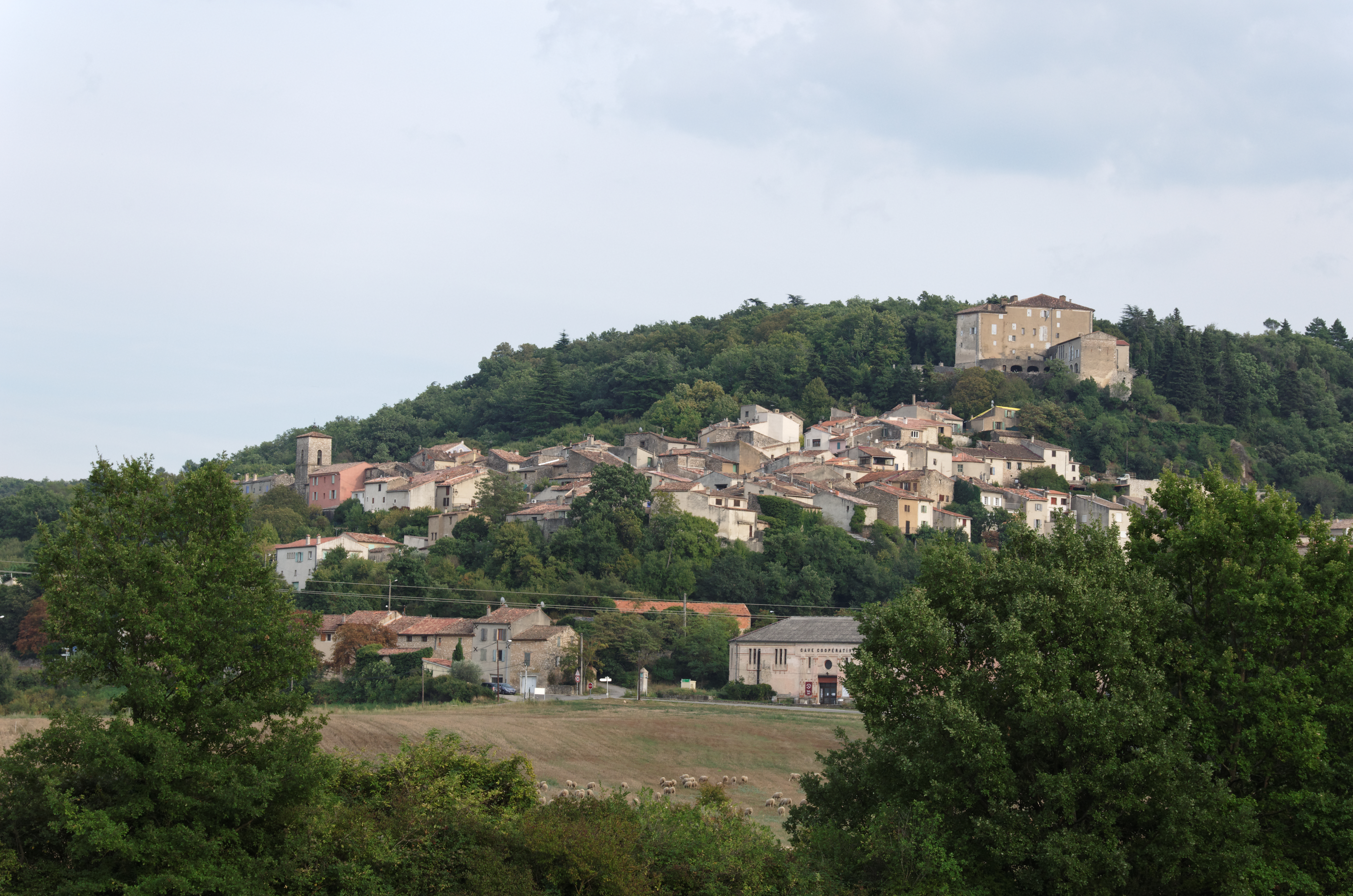
- A general view of the village

- Coat of arms
- Location of Esparron-de-Pallières
- Location within France Location within Provence-Alpes-Côte d'Azur
- Coordinates: 43°35′32″N 5°50′57″E
- Country: France
- Region: Provence-Alpes-Côte d'Azur
- Department: Var
- Arrondissement: Brignoles
- Canton: Saint-Maximin-la-Sainte-Baume

Government
  - Mayor (2020–2026): Christian Ghinamo
- Area^{1}: 30.04 km^{2} (11.60 sq mi)
- Elevation: 480 m (1,570 ft)
- Highest elevation: 641 m (2,103 ft)
- Lowest elevation: 327 m (1,073 ft)
- Population (2023): 377
  - Density: 12.5/km^{2} (32.5/sq mi)
- Time zone: UTC+01:00 (CET)
  - Summer (DST): UTC+02:00 (CEST)
- INSEE/Postal code: 83052 /83560
- ^{1} French Land Register data, which excludes lakes, ponds, glaciers > 1 km^{2} (0.386 sq mi or 247 acres) and river estuaries.

Esparron-de-Pallières (before 2026: Esparron, French pronunciation: [ɛspaʁɔ̃]) is a commune in the Var department in the Provence-Alpes-Côte d'Azur region in southeastern France.

== See also ==
- Communes of the Var department
