= Châteauvert =

Châteauvert Castèuverd (Occitan)
- Commune
- Coat of arms
- Location of Châteauvert
- Location within France Location within Provence-Alpes-Côte d'Azur
- Coordinates: 43°30′03″N 6°01′36″E
- Country: France
- Region: Provence-Alpes-Côte d'Azur
- Department: Var
- Arrondissement: Brignoles
- Canton: Saint-Maximin-la-Sainte-Baume
- Intercommunality: CA Provence Verte

Government
  - Mayor (2020–2026): Serge Loudes
- Area^{1}: 27.52 km^{2} (10.63 sq mi)
- Elevation: 187 m (614 ft)
- Highest elevation: 561 m (1,841 ft)
- Lowest elevation: 162 m (531 ft)
- Population (2023): 141
  - Density: 5.12/km^{2} (13.3/sq mi)
- Time zone: UTC+01:00 (CET)
  - Summer (DST): UTC+02:00 (CEST)
- INSEE/Postal code: 83039 /83670
- ^{1} French Land Register data, which excludes lakes, ponds, glaciers > 1 km^{2} (0.386 sq mi or 247 acres) and river estuaries.

Châteauvert (French: [ʃɑtovɛʁ]; Occitan: Castèuverd) is a commune in the Var department in the Provence-Alpes-Côte d'Azur region in southeastern France. Châteauvert is well known for rock climbing.

== See also ==
- Communes of the Var department
