= Barjols =

- Commune
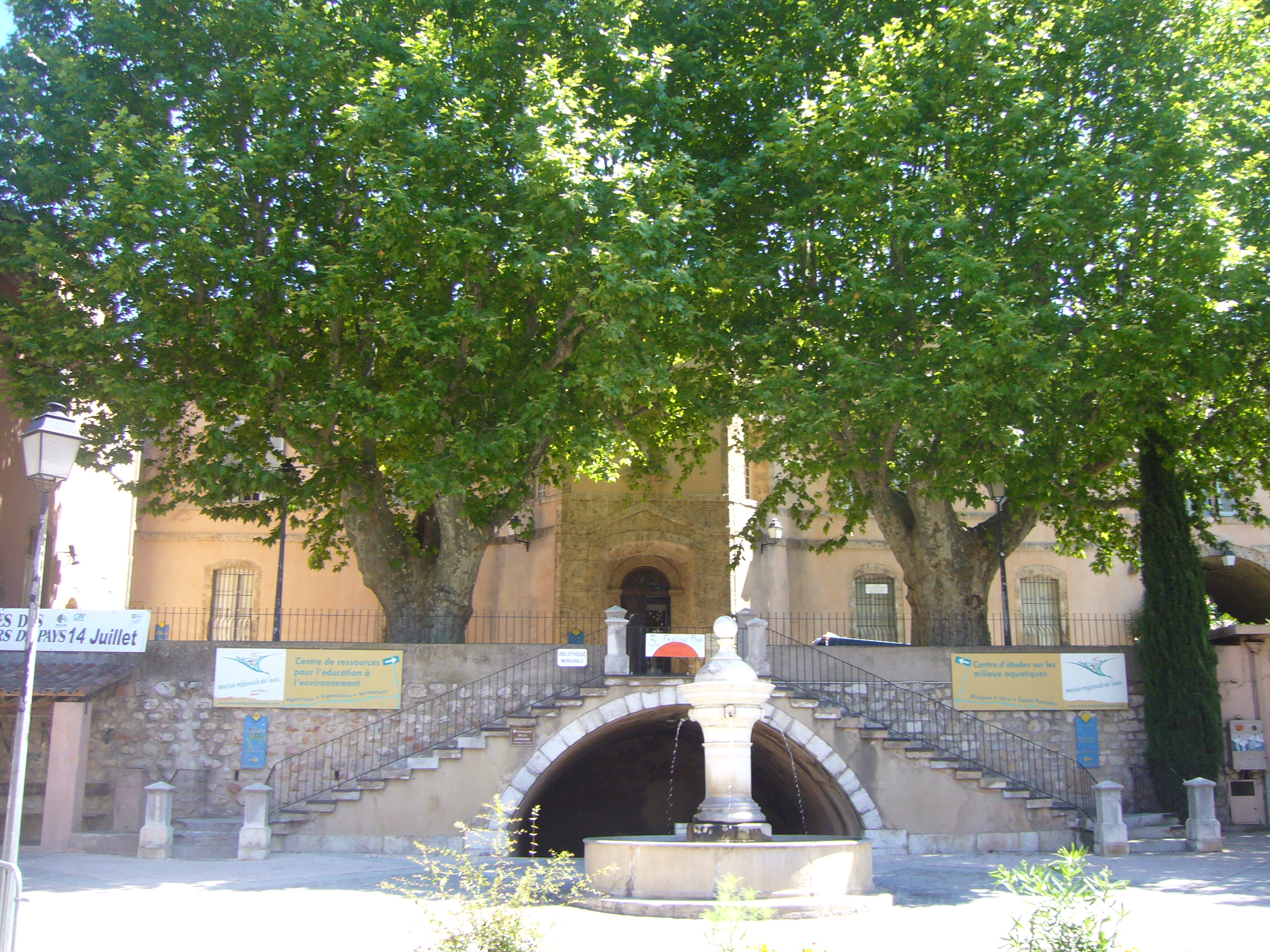
- Maison Régionale de l'eau

- Coat of arms
- Location of Barjols
- Location within France Location within Provence-Alpes-Côte d'Azur
- Coordinates: 43°33′32″N 6°00′29″E
- Country: France
- Region: Provence-Alpes-Côte d'Azur
- Department: Var
- Arrondissement: Brignoles
- Canton: Saint-Maximin-la-Sainte-Baume

Government
  - Mayor (2024–2026): Cathy Venturino-Gabelle
- Area^{1}: 30.06 km^{2} (11.61 sq mi)
- Elevation: 259 m (850 ft)
- Highest elevation: 473 m (1,552 ft)
- Lowest elevation: 183 m (600 ft)
- Population (2023): 2,984
  - Density: 99.27/km^{2} (257.1/sq mi)
- Time zone: UTC+01:00 (CET)
  - Summer (DST): UTC+02:00 (CEST)
- INSEE/Postal code: 83012 /83670
- ^{1} French Land Register data, which excludes lakes, ponds, glaciers > 1 km^{2} (0.386 sq mi or 247 acres) and river estuaries.

Barjols (French pronunciation: [baʁʒɔl]; Occitan: Barjòus) is a commune in the Var department in the Provence-Alpes-Côte d'Azur region in southeastern France.

At the gateway to Haute Provence and the hills of Var, near the Verdon gorges and the Lake of St. Croix, the town is set on a limestone cliff. Featuring 42 fountains, Barjols' architecture and life have been determined for centuries by the omnipresence of water. Historical buildings include the 11th century Collegiate Church. Leather was the mainstay of the village economy until the late 20th century when production moved to emerging economies and decline set in. Owing to this more recent industry, Barjols did not embrace tourism, and has kept many features and characters of French village life.

== Population ==
Historical population
| Year | Pop. | ±% p.a. |
|---|---|---|
| 1968 | 2,150 | — |
| 1975 | 2,092 | −0.39% |
| 1982 | 2,016 | −0.53% |
| 1990 | 2,166 | +0.90% |
| 1999 | 2,414 | +1.21% |
| 2007 | 3,041 | +2.93% |
| 2012 | 3,080 | +0.26% |
| 2017 | 2,979 | −0.66% |
| 2023 | 2,984 | +0.03% |
Source: INSEE

== Sites of interest ==
- The Collegiate Church of Notre Dame de I'Assomption,
- Portal of Ponteves
- Regional Water Museum
- The fountains
- Vineyards

== Neighbouring villages ==
- Tavernes (5 km),
- Varages (7 km),
- Châteauvert (8 km),
- Cotignac (15 km)
- Brue Auriac (10 km).

== See also ==
- Communes of the Var department
