= La Verdière =

- Commune
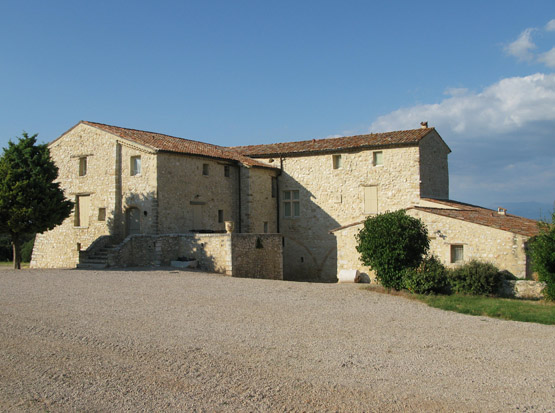
- The Bastide de Brauch, in La Verdière

- Coat of arms
- Location of La Verdière
- Location within France Location within Provence-Alpes-Côte d'Azur
- Coordinates: 43°38′22″N 5°56′12″E
- Country: France
- Region: Provence-Alpes-Côte d'Azur
- Department: Var
- Arrondissement: Brignoles
- Canton: Saint-Maximin-la-Sainte-Baume
- Intercommunality: Provence Verdon

Government
  - Mayor (2020–2026): Gilles Rogier
- Area^{1}: 68.16 km^{2} (26.32 sq mi)
- Elevation: 474 m (1,555 ft)
- Highest elevation: 692 m (2,270 ft)
- Lowest elevation: 327 m (1,073 ft)
- Population (2023): 1,668
  - Density: 24.47/km^{2} (63.38/sq mi)
- Time zone: UTC+01:00 (CET)
  - Summer (DST): UTC+02:00 (CEST)
- INSEE/Postal code: 83146 /83560
- ^{1} French Land Register data, which excludes lakes, ponds, glaciers > 1 km^{2} (0.386 sq mi or 247 acres) and river estuaries.

La Verdière (French pronunciation: [la vɛʁdjɛʁ]; Occitan: La Verdiera) is a commune in the Var department in the Provence-Alpes-Côte d'Azur region in southeastern France. The castle and its grounds were fully classified in 1986 as historical monuments.

== Château of La Verdière ==
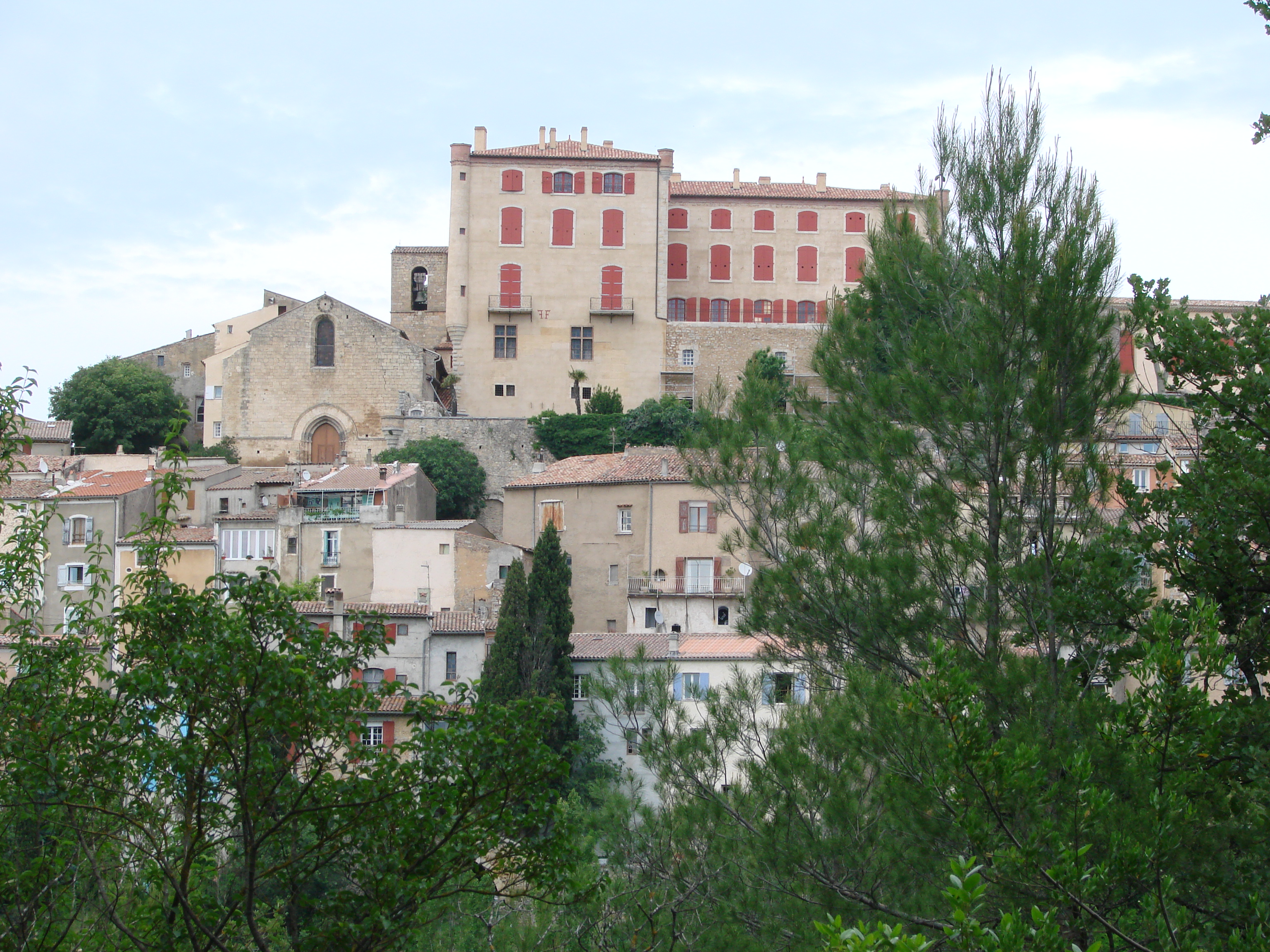
View of La Verdière from the west

Perched at the top of the village, the Château of La Verdière embraces a vast panorama. To the north one can see the communes of Moustiers-Sainte-Marie and Castellane, to the west the Mont Ventoux and the Luberon, south-west the mountains of Sainte-Baume and Sainte-Victoire and, south-east the Massif des Maures (chain of mountains from the Alps to the Rhone).

== History ==
In 980, the family of the Counts of Castellane, one of the most ancient and illustrious families of Provence, built a fortress: La Verdière. Having belonged to the Counts of Ventimiglia from 1262 to 1437, the building returned to the house of Castellane and in 1613, to the family of the Counts of Forbin. These three great families gave the castle of La Verdière special architecture born out of these different periods of development.

In the tenth century, the original building, oriented northwest–southeast, was composed of two superimposed rooms: the lower hall, built onto the slope of the rock, and a second room that could hold two to three hundred people. Strategically, La Verdière commanded the road leading from Arles to Castellane.

A chapel was also built at the foot of the castle. In the thirteenth century, under the aegis of the House of Ventimiglia, an ancient Sicilian family made La Verdière their first great work, causing it gradually to lost its military character. Retaining its original form, the castle expanded considerably and a dungeon was added to the building. A church, in Romanesque style, replaced the original small chapel. In the fifteenth century, the castle came by succession to the family of Castellane.

From 1437 to 1613, the castle experienced a new period of work. The main tower was demolished but the building was expanding northward. A new building was built on the side of the courtyard and vaulted rooms below the terrace housing the stables. A garden called "carousel" was constructed. Finally, the church gained a bell tower and housed a presbytery. No longer part of the castle today but, the village church's architecture has hardly changed over seven centuries. In the seventeenth century with the marriage of Aymar de Castellane with Anne Vincent de Forbin, the castle went to the family of Forbin.

The Forbin family added a tower at the corner terraces and a grand dual staircase ramp to access them. A private balcony overlooking the chapel of the church was also added to allow the Lord to participate in services out of sight. In 1750, Louis-Roch de Forbin, a brilliant officer of the king, retired to La Verdière. For seventeen years, extensive work was undertaken and give the building the appearance it has today. The house and castle was converted into a real pleasure including a 40 m-long (130 ft) terrace, six lounges, a dining room, two kitchens, a ballroom measuring over 20 m (66 ft) long, a library, an archives room, many rooms with dependencies, e.g. bathrooms, rooms for domestic, lingerie, etc.

The history of the castle and the village of La Verdière are strongly linked. The inhabitants were constantly made to work, which gave rise to many complaints, especially in the fifteenth century when a compromise was reached between the residents and the Lord of Castellane. Not shaken by the wars, the castle of La Verdière knew few. The wars of religion (1562–1598), where the Lords of La Verdière were very active, left little legacy to the building, except the church which was destroyed.

The French Revolution did more damage. In the absence of Louis-Roch de Forbin, villagers plundered the castle which was then added to the national property confiscated by the new regime. The castle after losing doors, windows and roof was in danger of demolition, the department promised 30,000 francs to demolish it. The destruction threatened homes below. The subsequent revolutions (1830, 1848 and 1870) were more lenient. One event, however, was long remembered; in 1851, a revolutionary contingent visiting Aups where an insurrection was taking place, stopped at La Verdière. On the orders of the Colonel in charge of troops, 800 men, infantry and artillery, were housed within the walls of the castle.

== See also ==
- Communes of the Var department
