= Ollières =

- Commune
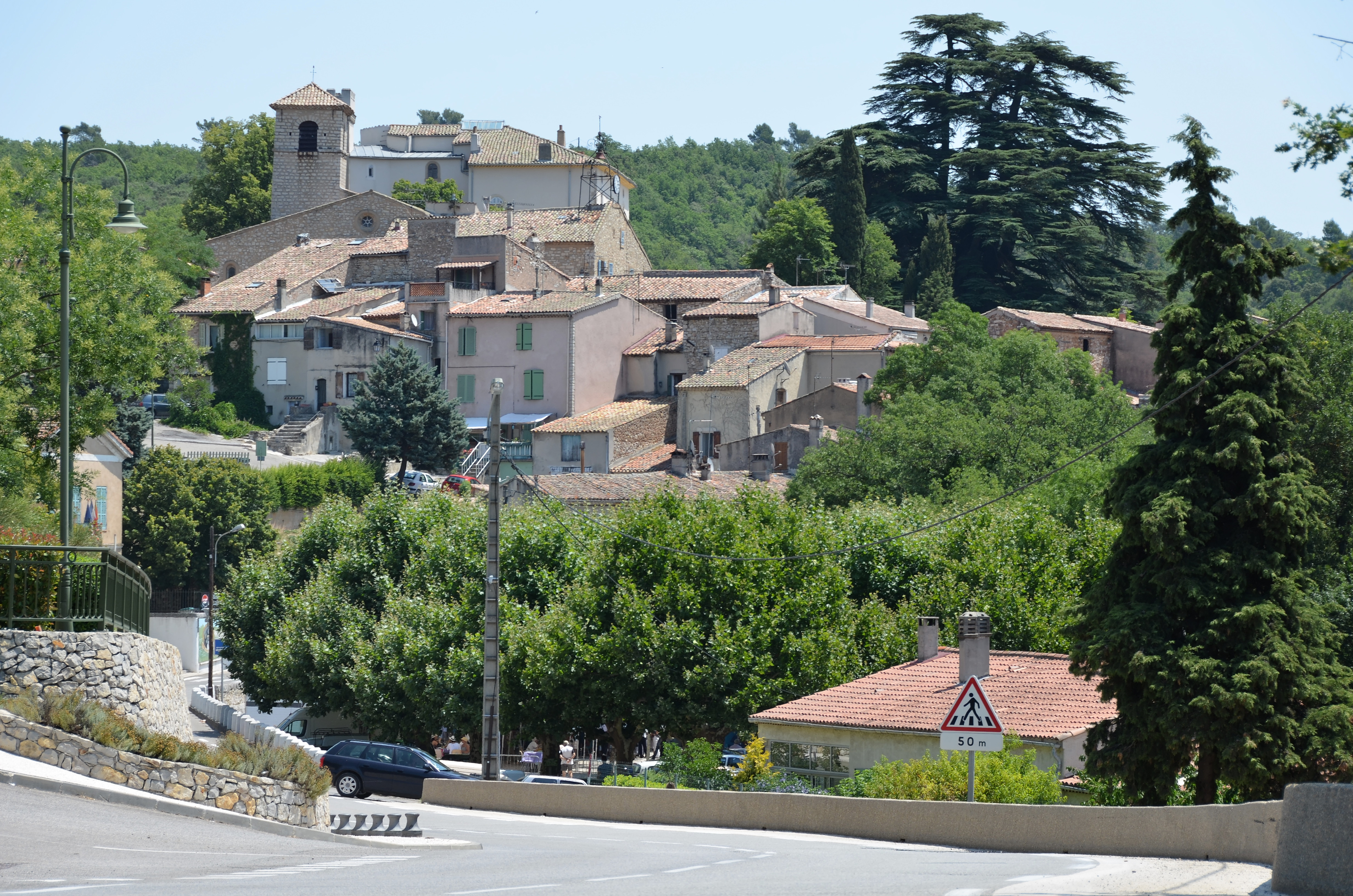
- A general view of Ollières

- Coat of arms
- Location of Ollières
- Location within France Location within Provence-Alpes-Côte d'Azur
- Coordinates: 43°28′58″N 5°49′46″E
- Country: France
- Region: Provence-Alpes-Côte d'Azur
- Department: Var
- Arrondissement: Brignoles
- Canton: Saint-Maximin-la-Sainte-Baume
- Intercommunality: CA Provence Verte

Government
  - Mayor (2023–2026): Olivier Barthélémy
- Area^{1}: 39.66 km^{2} (15.31 sq mi)
- Elevation: 410 m (1,350 ft)
- Highest elevation: 621 m (2,037 ft)
- Lowest elevation: 311 m (1,020 ft)
- Population (2023): 636
  - Density: 16.0/km^{2} (41.5/sq mi)
- Time zone: UTC+01:00 (CET)
  - Summer (DST): UTC+02:00 (CEST)
- INSEE/Postal code: 83089 /83470
- ^{1} French Land Register data, which excludes lakes, ponds, glaciers > 1 km^{2} (0.386 sq mi or 247 acres) and river estuaries.

Ollières (French pronunciation: [ɔljɛʁ]; Occitan: Olieras) is a commune in the Var department in the Provence-Alpes-Côte d'Azur region in southeastern France.

== See also ==
- Communes of the Var department
