= Ginasservis =

- Commune
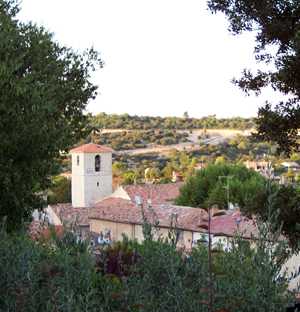
- The church of Saint-Laurent, in Ginasservis

- Coat of arms
- Location of Ginasservis
- Location within France Location within Provence-Alpes-Côte d'Azur
- Coordinates: 43°40′19″N 5°50′58″E
- Country: France
- Region: Provence-Alpes-Côte d'Azur
- Department: Var
- Arrondissement: Brignoles
- Canton: Saint-Maximin-la-Sainte-Baume
- Intercommunality: Provence Verdon

Government
  - Mayor (2020–2026): Hervé Philibert
- Area^{1}: 37.47 km^{2} (14.47 sq mi)
- Elevation: 350 m (1,150 ft)
- Highest elevation: 490 m (1,610 ft)
- Lowest elevation: 312 m (1,024 ft)
- Population (2023): 2,075
  - Density: 55.38/km^{2} (143.4/sq mi)
- Time zone: UTC+01:00 (CET)
  - Summer (DST): UTC+02:00 (CEST)
- INSEE/Postal code: 83066 /83560
- ^{1} French Land Register data, which excludes lakes, ponds, glaciers > 1 km^{2} (0.386 sq mi or 247 acres) and river estuaries.

Ginasservis (French pronunciation: [ʒinasɛʁvi]; Occitan: Ginacèrvias) is a commune in the Var department in the Provence-Alpes-Côte d'Azur region in southeastern France.

== Population ==
Historical population
Year	Pop.	±% p.a.
1968	612	—
1975	643	+0.71%
1982	779	+2.78%
1990	911	+1.98%
1999	984	+0.86%
2007	1,412	+4.62%
2012	1,551	+1.90%
2017	1,799	+3.01%
2023	2,075	+2.41%
Source: INSEE

== See also ==
- Communes of the Var department
