= Saint-Martin-de-Pallières =

- Commune
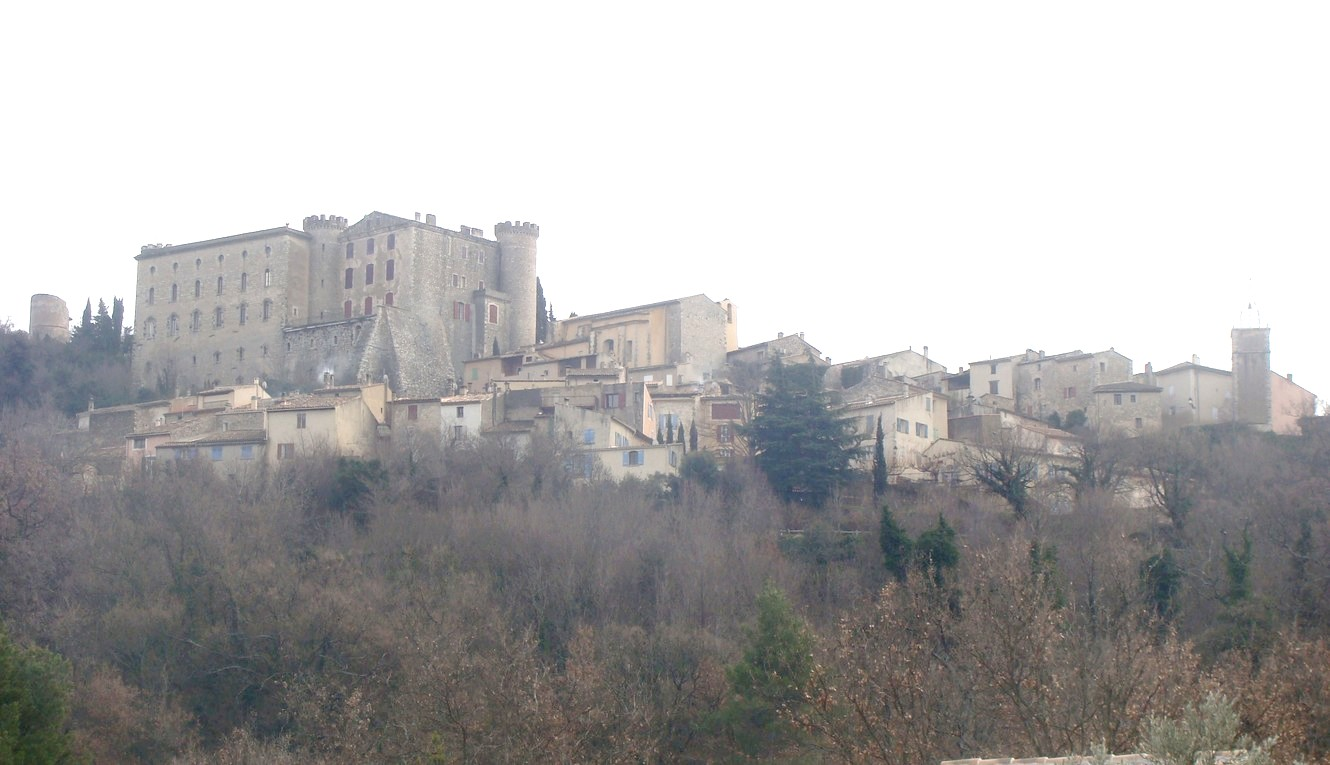
- A general view of the village

- Coat of arms
- Location of Saint-Martin-de-Pallières
- Location within France Location within Provence-Alpes-Côte d'Azur
- Coordinates: 43°35′22″N 5°53′07″E
- Country: France
- Region: Provence-Alpes-Côte d'Azur
- Department: Var
- Arrondissement: Brignoles
- Canton: Saint-Maximin-la-Sainte-Baume

Government
  - Mayor (2020–2026): Bernard de Boisgelin
- Area^{1}: 26.33 km^{2} (10.17 sq mi)
- Elevation: 425 m (1,394 ft)
- Highest elevation: 582 m (1,909 ft)
- Lowest elevation: 343 m (1,125 ft)
- Population (2023): 284
  - Density: 10.8/km^{2} (27.9/sq mi)
- Time zone: UTC+01:00 (CET)
  - Summer (DST): UTC+02:00 (CEST)
- INSEE/Postal code: 83114 /83560
- ^{1} French Land Register data, which excludes lakes, ponds, glaciers > 1 km^{2} (0.386 sq mi or 247 acres) and river estuaries.

Saint-Martin-de-Pallières (French pronunciation: [sɛ̃ maʁtɛ̃ də paljɛʁ]; Provençal: Sant Martin de Palhièras), formerly Saint-Martin, is a commune in the Var department in the Provence-Alpes-Côte d'Azur region in southeastern France.

== See also ==
- Communes of the Var department
