= Seillons-Source-d'Argens =

- Commune
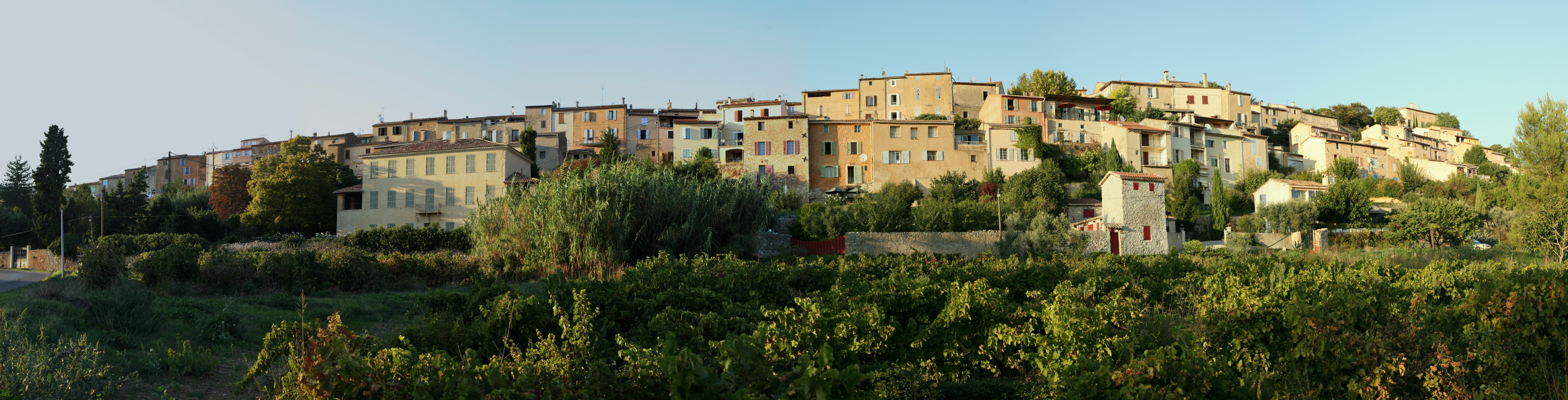
- A general view of the village

- Coat of arms
- Location of Seillons-Source-d'Argens
- Location within France Location within Provence-Alpes-Côte d'Azur
- Coordinates: 43°29′50″N 5°53′04″E
- Country: France
- Region: Provence-Alpes-Côte d'Azur
- Department: Var
- Arrondissement: Brignoles
- Canton: Saint-Maximin-la-Sainte-Baume
- Intercommunality: Provence Verdon

Government
  - Mayor (2020–2026): Stéphane Arnaud
- Area^{1}: 25.11 km^{2} (9.70 sq mi)
- Elevation: 320 m (1,050 ft)
- Highest elevation: 580 m (1,900 ft)
- Lowest elevation: 263 m (863 ft)
- Population (2023): 2,818
  - Density: 112.2/km^{2} (290.7/sq mi)
- Time zone: UTC+01:00 (CET)
  - Summer (DST): UTC+02:00 (CEST)
- INSEE/Postal code: 83125 /83470
- ^{1} French Land Register data, which excludes lakes, ponds, glaciers > 1 km^{2} (0.386 sq mi or 247 acres) and river estuaries.

Seillons-Source-d'Argens (French pronunciation: [sɛjɔ̃ suʁs daʁʒɑ̃(s)], literally Seillons-Source of Argens; Occitan: Selhon Fònt d'Argenç) is a commune in the Var department in the Provence-Alpes-Côte d'Azur region in southeastern France.

== Population ==
Historical population
| Year | Pop. | ±% p.a. |
|---|---|---|
| 1968 | 295 | — |
| 1975 | 309 | +0.66% |
| 1982 | 397 | +3.64% |
| 1990 | 844 | +9.89% |
| 1999 | 1,610 | +7.44% |
| 2007 | 2,068 | +3.18% |
| 2012 | 2,266 | +1.85% |
| 2017 | 2,468 | +1.72% |
| 2023 | 2,818 | +2.23% |
Source: INSEE

== See also ==
- Communes of the Var department
