= Saint-Julien, Var =

Saint-Julien
- Commune
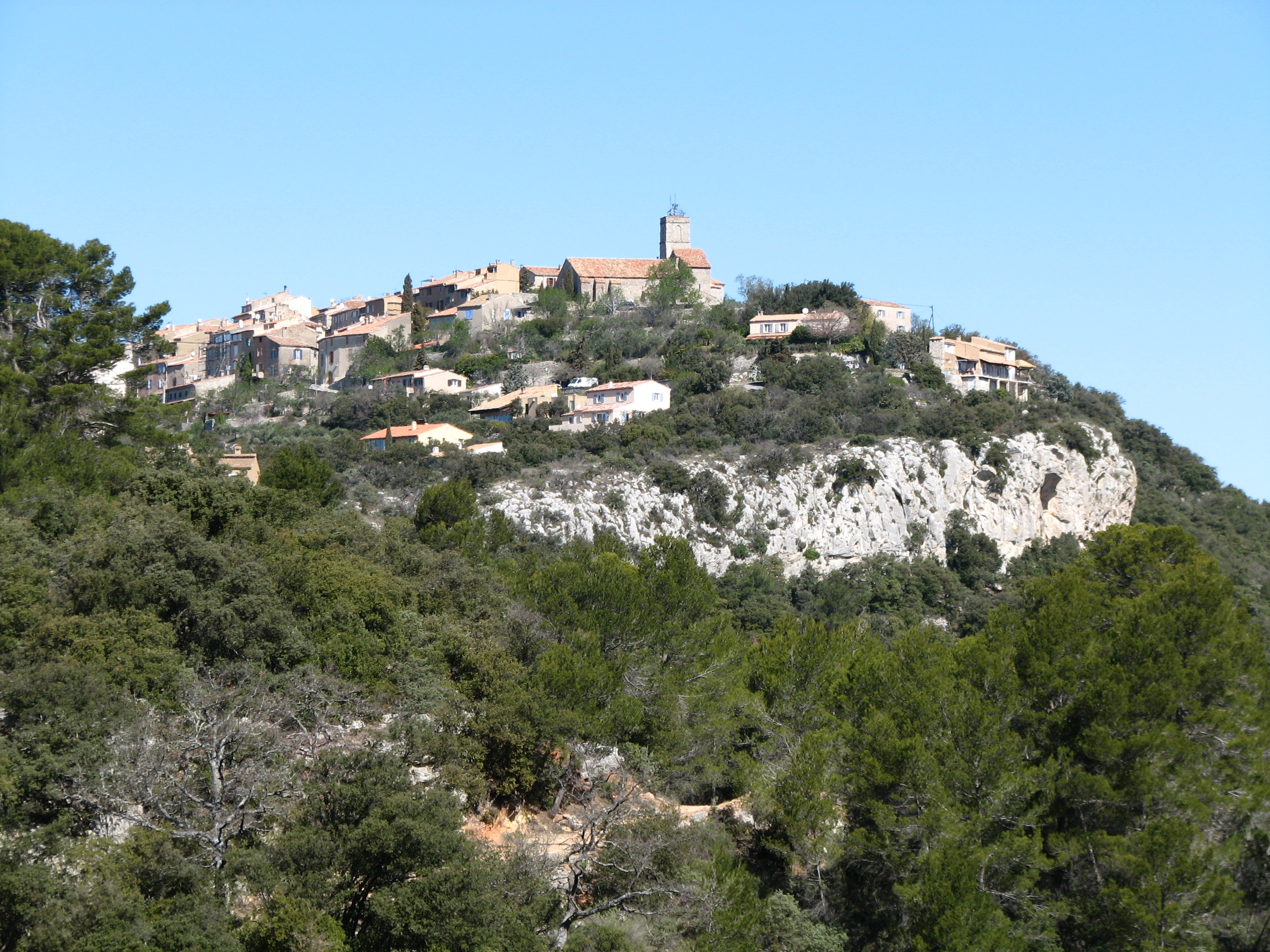
- A general view of Saint-Julien-le-Montagnier

- Coat of arms
- Location of Saint-Julien
- Location within France Location within Provence-Alpes-Côte d'Azur
- Coordinates: 43°41′31″N 5°54′28″E
- Country: France
- Region: Provence-Alpes-Côte d'Azur
- Department: Var
- Arrondissement: Brignoles
- Canton: Saint-Maximin-la-Sainte-Baume

Government
  - Mayor (2020–2026): Emmanuel Hugou
- Area^{1}: 75.88 km^{2} (29.30 sq mi)
- Elevation: 578 m (1,896 ft)
- Highest elevation: 596 m (1,955 ft)
- Lowest elevation: 297 m (974 ft)
- Population (2023): 2,453
  - Density: 32.33/km^{2} (83.73/sq mi)
- Time zone: UTC+01:00 (CET)
  - Summer (DST): UTC+02:00 (CEST)
- INSEE/Postal code: 83113 /83560
- ^{1} French Land Register data, which excludes lakes, ponds, glaciers > 1 km^{2} (0.386 sq mi or 247 acres) and river estuaries.

Saint-Julien (French pronunciation: [sɛ̃ ʒyljɛ̃]; also known as Saint-Julien-le-Montagnier; Provençal: Sant Julian lo Montanhier) is a commune in the Var department in the Provence-Alpes-Côte d'Azur region in southeastern France.

== Population ==
Historical population
Year	Pop.	±% p.a.
1968	421	—
1975	611	+5.47%
1982	825	+4.38%
1990	1,149	+4.23%
1999	1,280	+1.21%
2007	1,744	+3.94%
2012	2,222	+4.96%
2017	2,409	+1.63%
2023	2,453	+0.30%
Source: INSEE

== See also ==
- Communes of the Var department
