= Pourcieux =

- Commune
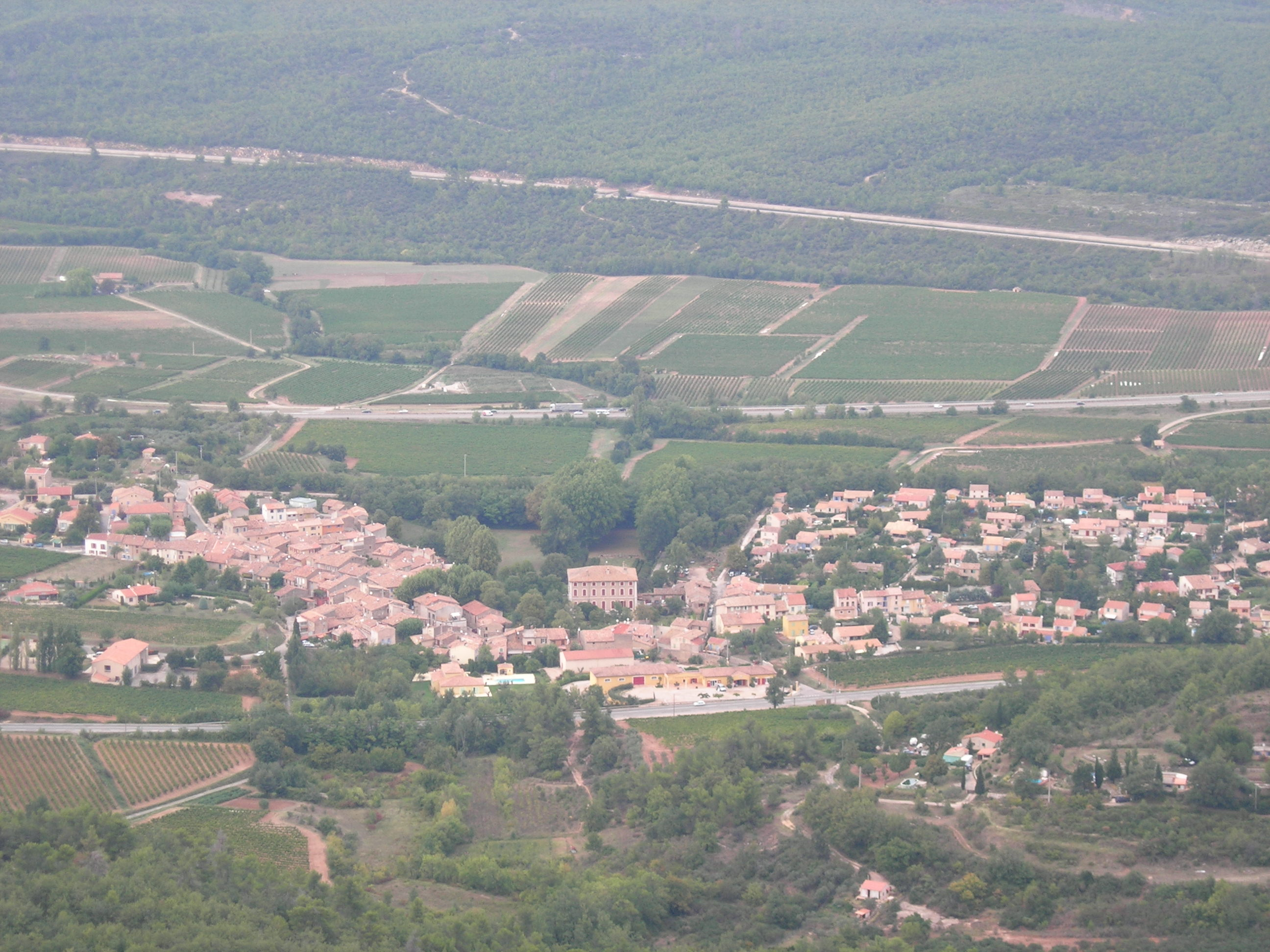
- The village seen from Mount Aurélien

- Coat of arms
- Location of Pourcieux
- Location within France Location within Provence-Alpes-Côte d'Azur
- Coordinates: 43°28′12″N 5°47′10″E
- Country: France
- Region: Provence-Alpes-Côte d'Azur
- Department: Var
- Arrondissement: Brignoles
- Canton: Saint-Maximin-la-Sainte-Baume
- Intercommunality: CA Provence Verte

Government
  - Mayor (2020–2026): Claude Porzio
- Area^{1}: 21.23 km^{2} (8.20 sq mi)
- Elevation: 350 m (1,150 ft)
- Highest elevation: 870 m (2,850 ft)
- Lowest elevation: 278 m (912 ft)
- Population (2023): 1,552
  - Density: 73.10/km^{2} (189.3/sq mi)
- Time zone: UTC+01:00 (CET)
  - Summer (DST): UTC+02:00 (CEST)
- INSEE/Postal code: 83096 /83470
- ^{1} French Land Register data, which excludes lakes, ponds, glaciers > 1 km^{2} (0.386 sq mi or 247 acres) and river estuaries.

Pourcieux (French pronunciation: [puʁsjø]; Occitan: Porcièu) is a commune in the Var department in the Provence-Alpes-Côte d'Azur region in southeastern France.

The small village provides a typical image of the Provence of Frédéric Mistral, with vine-grower's houses built around a castle, and a town square and fountain shaded by hundred year-old plane trees. Its sunny hillsides sit at the foot of the Monts Auréliens, a short distance from the Montagne Sainte-Victoire made famous by Paul Cézanne.

== See also ==
- Communes of the Var department
