= Canton of Saint-Maximin-la-Sainte-Baume =

Coordinates: 43.45°N 5.86°E

The canton of Saint-Maximin-la-Sainte-Baume is an administrative division of the Var department, southeastern France. Its borders were modified at the French canton reorganisation which came into effect in March 2015. Its seat is in Saint-Maximin-la-Sainte-Baume.

It consists of the following communes:

1. Artigues
2. Barjols
3. Bras
4. Brue-Auriac
5. Châteauvert
6. Esparron-de-Pallières
7. Ginasservis
8. Ollières
9. Pontevès
10. Pourcieux
11. Pourrières
12. Rians
13. Saint-Julien
14. Saint-Martin-de-Pallières
15. Saint-Maximin-la-Sainte-Baume
16. Seillons-Source-d'Argens
17. Varages
18. La Verdière
19. Vinon-sur-Verdon
