= Rians, Var =

Rians
- Commune
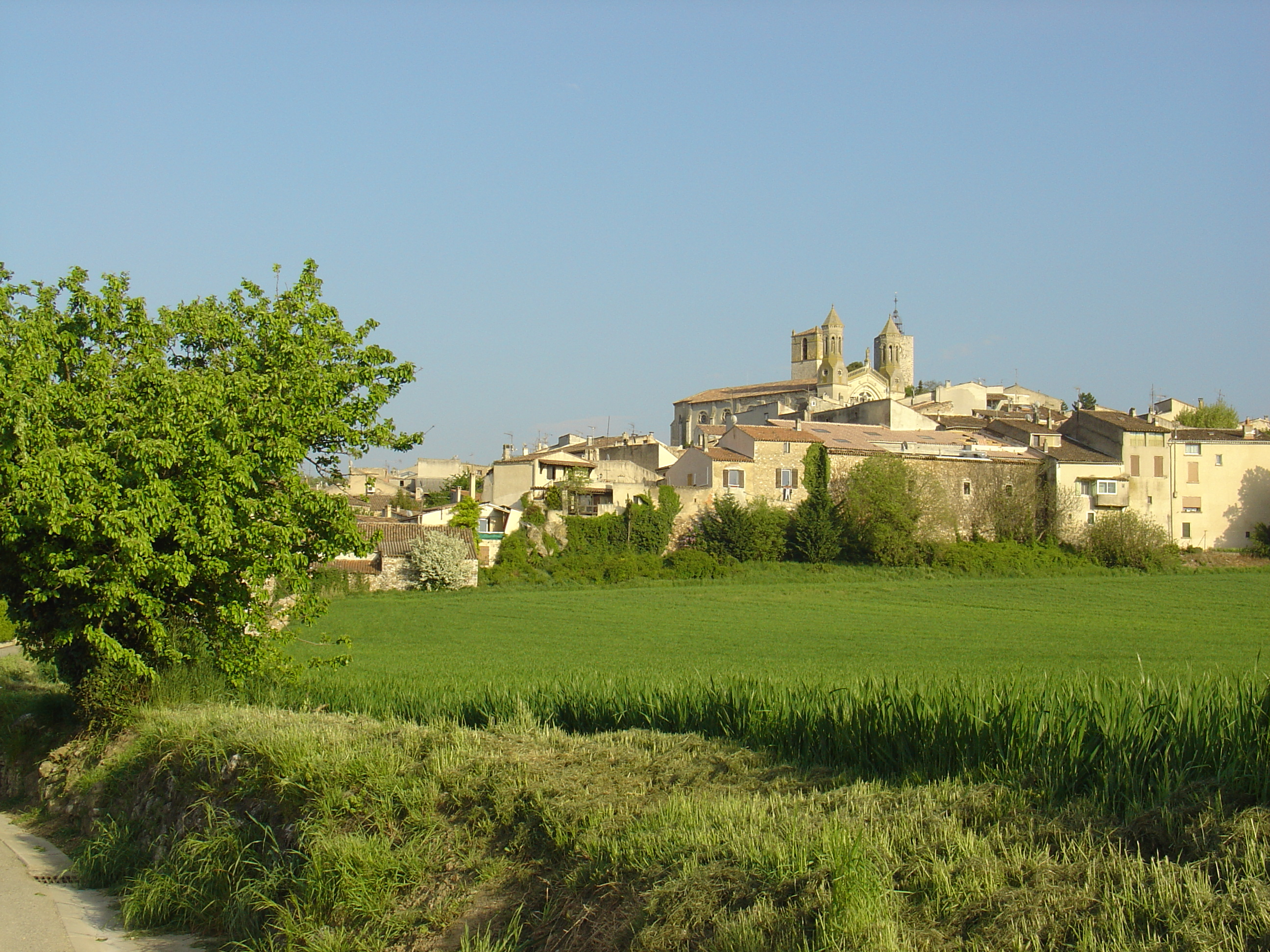
- A view of the church and bell tower in Rians

- Coat of arms
- Location of Rians
- Location within France Location within Provence-Alpes-Côte d'Azur
- Coordinates: 43°36′28″N 5°45′28″E
- Country: France
- Region: Provence-Alpes-Côte d'Azur
- Department: Var
- Arrondissement: Brignoles
- Canton: Saint-Maximin-la-Sainte-Baume

Government
  - Mayor (2020–2026): Nicolas Bremond
- Area^{1}: 96.87 km^{2} (37.40 sq mi)
- Elevation: 455 m (1,493 ft)
- Highest elevation: 651 m (2,136 ft)
- Lowest elevation: 291 m (955 ft)
- Population (2023): 4,223
  - Density: 43.59/km^{2} (112.9/sq mi)
- Time zone: UTC+01:00 (CET)
  - Summer (DST): UTC+02:00 (CEST)
- INSEE/Postal code: 83104 /83560
- ^{1} French Land Register data, which excludes lakes, ponds, glaciers > 1 km^{2} (0.386 sq mi or 247 acres) and river estuaries.

Rians (French pronunciation: [ʁjɑ̃s]; Occitan: Rians) is a commune in the Var department in the Provence-Alpes-Côte d'Azur region in southeastern France.

Rians is a provençal village in the Upper Var located north east of the Montagne Sainte-Victoire. The main employment is agriculture, predominantly wine. The village itself is built on a hill that is dominated by a 12th-century bell tower and the church of Notre Dame de Nazareth. The Town is made up of concentric medieval streets that work their way down the hill.

Notable events in Rians include dancing in the squares on 14 July, the Fête de St Laurent on 8 August and the Fête de la Courge in October.

== Population ==
Historical population
Year	Pop.	±% p.a.
1968	1,492	—
1975	1,458	−0.33%
1982	1,723	+2.41%
1990	2,720	+5.87%
1999	3,628	+3.25%
2007	4,205	+1.86%
2012	4,345	+0.66%
2017	4,232	−0.53%
2023	4,223	−0.04%
Source: INSEE

== See also ==
- Communes of the Var department
