= Auriol, Bouches-du-Rhône =

Commune in Provence-Alpes-Côte d'Azur, France

Auriol Auriòu (Occitan)
- Commune
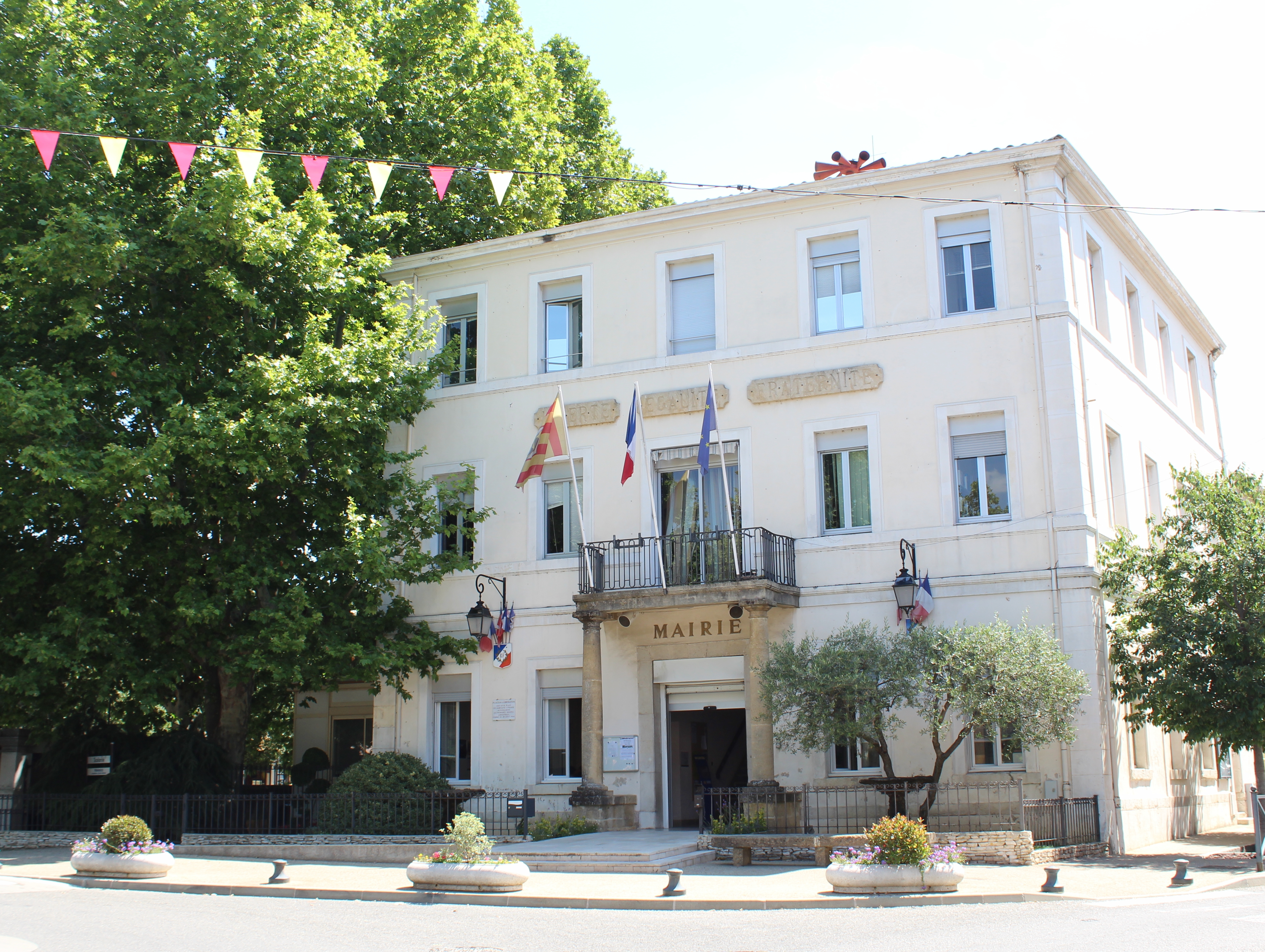
- Auriol Town Hall

- Coat of arms
- Location of Auriol
- Location within France Location within Provence-Alpes-Côte d'Azur
- Coordinates: 43°22′05″N 5°38′10″E
- Country: France
- Region: Provence-Alpes-Côte d'Azur
- Department: Bouches-du-Rhône
- Arrondissement: Marseille
- Canton: Allauch
- Intercommunality: Aix-Marseille-Provence

Government
  - Mayor (2026–32): Véronique Miquelly (LR)
- Area^{1}: 44.64 km^{2} (17.24 sq mi)
- Elevation: 380 m (1,250 ft)
- Highest elevation: 937 m (3,074 ft)
- Lowest elevation: 171 m (561 ft)
- Population (2023): 13,037
  - Density: 292.0/km^{2} (756.4/sq mi)
- Time zone: UTC+01:00 (CET)
  - Summer (DST): UTC+02:00 (CEST)
- INSEE/Postal code: 13007 /13390
- Dialling codes: 0491
- ^{1} French Land Register data, which excludes lakes, ponds, glaciers > 1 km^{2} (0.386 sq mi or 247 acres) and river estuaries.

Auriol (French pronunciation: [oʁjɔl]; Occitan: Auriòu) is a commune in the Huveaune valley in the Bouches-du-Rhône department in the Provence-Alpes-Côte d'Azur region of Southern France. The commune has been awarded one flower by the National Council of Towns and Villages in Bloom in the Competition of cities and villages in bloom (Concours des villes et villages fleuris). Located west of Roquevaire and northwest of Aubagne, it will be served by two stations of the Aubagne tramway when the northern Line T extension opens in 2023.

== Geography ==
Auriol is located some 22 km east by north-east of Marseille and 10 km north by north-east of Aubagne. The eastern border of the commune is the departmental border between Bouches-du-Rhône and Var. Access to the commune is by the A52D autoroute which separates from the A52 autoroute at the western border of the commune and ends at the D560 road just east of the town. The D560 road branches from the D96 on the western border of the commune and passes east through the town and continues east to Saint-Zacharie. The D45A comes from La Bouilladisse in the north-west and passes through the commune south to join the D2 in the south of the commune. The D2 continues east to Plan-d'Aups-Sainte-Baume. Apart from the main town there are the urban areas of Le Pujol, Pont de Joux, Les Artauds, Le Maltrait, La Douronne, Moulin de Redon, Le Moulin de Redon, Le Plan des Moines, Les Helianthes, Le Braou, La Gardy, Basson, and Vede. The commune is urbanised through the centre with rugged terrain to the south and north.

The Huveaune river flows through the centre of the urban area from east to west then continues south to join the ocean in the 8th arrondissement of Marseille. The Ruisseau de la Gestaude rises in the south of the commune and flows north to join the Huveaune.

The village of Moulin de Redon is closer to Saint-Zacharie but is under the Auriol administration authority. The legend says that there was a race between mayors of the two towns. On a particular date, at sunrise, the first mayor who reaches Moulin de Redon by foot was to receive the village under his administration. Saint Zacharie is less than 2 km to Moulin de Redon, while Auriol is 5 km. The mayor of Saint Zacharie, deeply convinced of his victory slept too much, and arrived after the mayor of Auriol. It illustrates "The fable of the hare and the turtle" by Jean de La Fontaine.

== History ==
There are many caves (Inferent caves, burial caves) in the Vède valley and shelters in the tuffs of Pont-de-Joux (tombs, Neolithic hatchets, skulls).

The Ligures were absorbed by the Celts in the Celto-Ligurian period. There are many oppida such as the oppidum of Bau Redon and the oppidum of Bau Rouge.

The Phoenicians arrived from the 6th century BC (Trésor d'Auriol) and the Romans from the 2nd century BC. The Battle of Arc resulted in victory for Marius over the Teutons at Campus Putridi. Marseille was taken by Julius Caesar in 49 BC.

There is an early Christian site at Saint-Pierre d'Auriol (early Christian altar with 12 doves, a church crypt, relics of Saint-Victor, the Cassian cult, Marie-Madeleine).

Isnard de Mauconseil (?-1395), squire and native of Aix, was co-lord of Auriol in 1378 with Squire Mison.

The death of Queen Joanna I of Naples created a crisis of succession for the County of Provence. The cities of the Union of Aix (1382–1387) supported Charles de Duras against Louis I of Anjou. The Auriol community initially supported Charles but were overrun by the troops of Louis early in the war (before 1385).

Auriol was ravaged by the plague of 1576–1584. The castle was devastated by the Duke of Épernon in 1593. The coat of arms of the village dates back to 1697.

In July 1981 the commune was the scene of an infamous massacre involving the Service d'Action Civique (SAC) in which police inspector Jacques Massié and his entire family were massacred.

== Heraldry ==
Arms of Auriol	Blazon: Vert, a loriot bird of Or winged in Sable with tail half Sable and Or perched on a branch of Argent posed in bend leafed with two leaves of Vert hanging at dexter, joined at nombril point to a branch Argent couped in fesse.

Former Arms of Auriol	The description of the former arms was: Or, a loriot bird of Vert perched on a branch posed in bend the same.

== Administration ==
List of successive mayors:

From	To	Name	Party	Other positions held
1900	1908	Honoré Plumier		
1908	1924	Jean Baptiste Robert		
1924	1928	Honoré Plumier		
1928	1944	Jean Baptiste Robert		
1944	1953	Marius Pascau		
1953	1965	Adolphe Bonnet		
1965	1970	Paul Feraud		
1970	2001	Lucienne Martin	PCF	
2001	2020	Danièle Garcia	DVG	Senator for Bouches-du-Rhône (2020)
2020	Current	Véronique Miquelly	DVD	

== Population ==
Its inhabitants are known as Auriolais or Auriolaises in French.

Historical population
Year	Pop.	±% p.a.
1968	3,000	—
1975	3,278	+1.27%
1982	5,222	+6.88%
1990	6,788	+3.33%
1999	9,461	+3.76%
2007	11,699	+2.69%
2012	11,621	−0.13%
2017	11,908	+0.49%
2023	13,037	+1.52%
Source: INSEE

== Economy ==
The economy of the commune is based on viticulture, olive oil and shopping (Pujol Commercial Centre).

== Culture and heritage ==
The Wine-growing Cooperative building at Place Charles-Adrien (1924) is registered as an historical monument. The War Memorial is registered on the Ministry of Culture's Mémoire database.

The Church of Saint-Pierre contains one item that is registered as an historical object, a painting: Adoration of Shepherds (18th century).

== Notable people linked to the commune ==
- Thierry Amiel (born 1982), singer and songwriter, grew up in Auriol
- Alain Cantareil (born 1983), footballer for FC Istres
- Mouss Diouf (1964–2012), French-Senegalese actor, comedian and humorist, buried in Auriol
- Mathieu Flamini (born 1984), footballer for Arsenal F.C.
- Charles Plumier (1646–1704), French botanist
- Henri Raybaud (1879–1942), French sculptor, made the War Memorial in Auriol

== See also ==
- Communes of the Bouches-du-Rhône department
