= Huveaune =

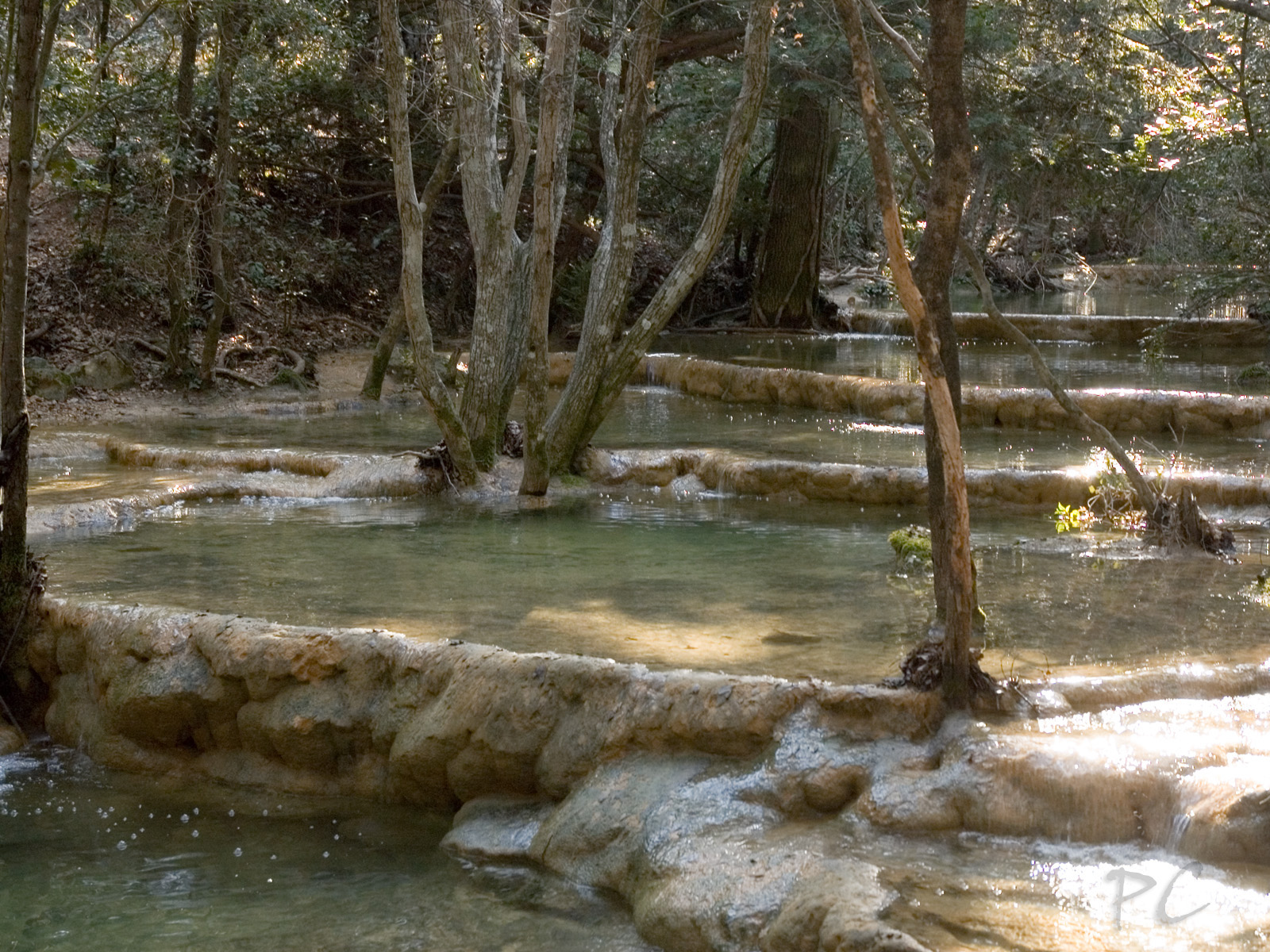
- The source of the Huveaune

- Location within France Location within Provence-Alpes-Côte d'Azur
- Native name: L'Huveaune (French)

Location
- Country: France

Physical characteristics
- Source
  - location: Sainte-Baume
  - elevation: 590 m (1,940 ft)
- Mouth: Mediterranean Sea
  - location: Marseille
  - coordinates: 43.2594°N 5.3734°E
- Length: 48.5 km (30.1 mi)
- Basin size: 502 km^{2} (194 mi^{2})
- Discharge
  - average: 10 m^{3}/s (350 cu ft/s)

The Huveaune (French pronunciation: [yvon]; Occitan: Evèuna) is a small river in the Provence-Alpes-Côte d'Azur region of southeastern France. It is 48.5 kilometres (30.1 mi) long and flows through the communes of La Penne-sur-Huveaune, Nans-les-Pins, Saint-Zacharie, Plan-d'Aups-Sainte-Baume, Auriol, Roquevaire, Aubagne, and the metropolitan area of Marseille.

The Huveaune rises in the Castelette cave at 590 metres (1,940 ft) in the Sainte-Baume mountain range, and runs into the Mediterranean Sea at Marseille. Its drainage basin is 502 km^{2} (194 sq mi).

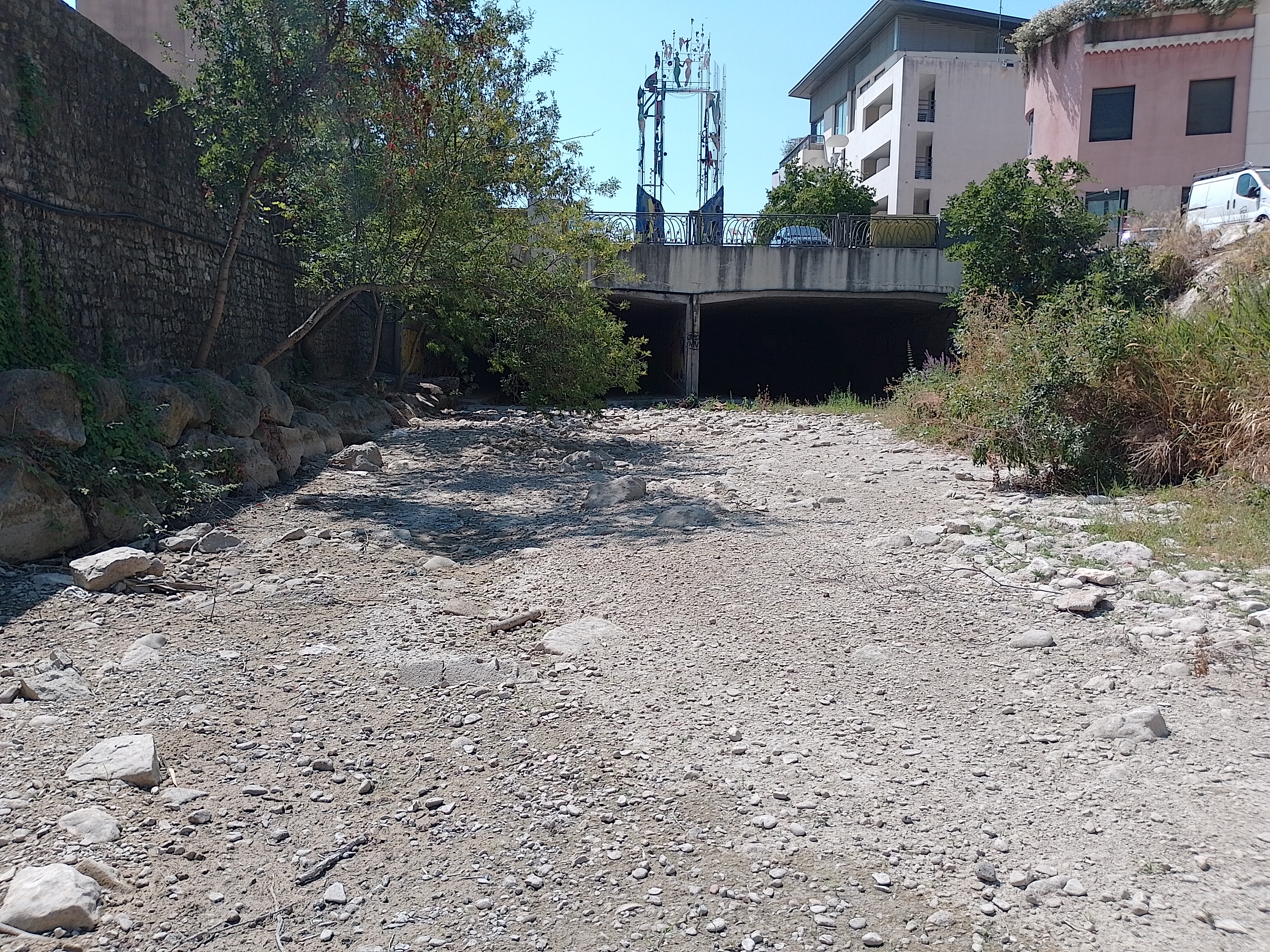
The Huveaune river bed in Aubagne during the July 2022 heatwave.

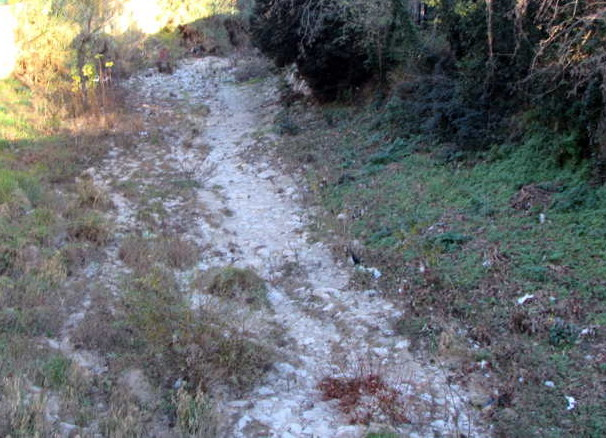
Dry riverbed of the Huveaune at St Giniez, near Marseilles
