= Le Castellet, Var =

Le Castellet Lo Castelet (Occitan)
- Commune
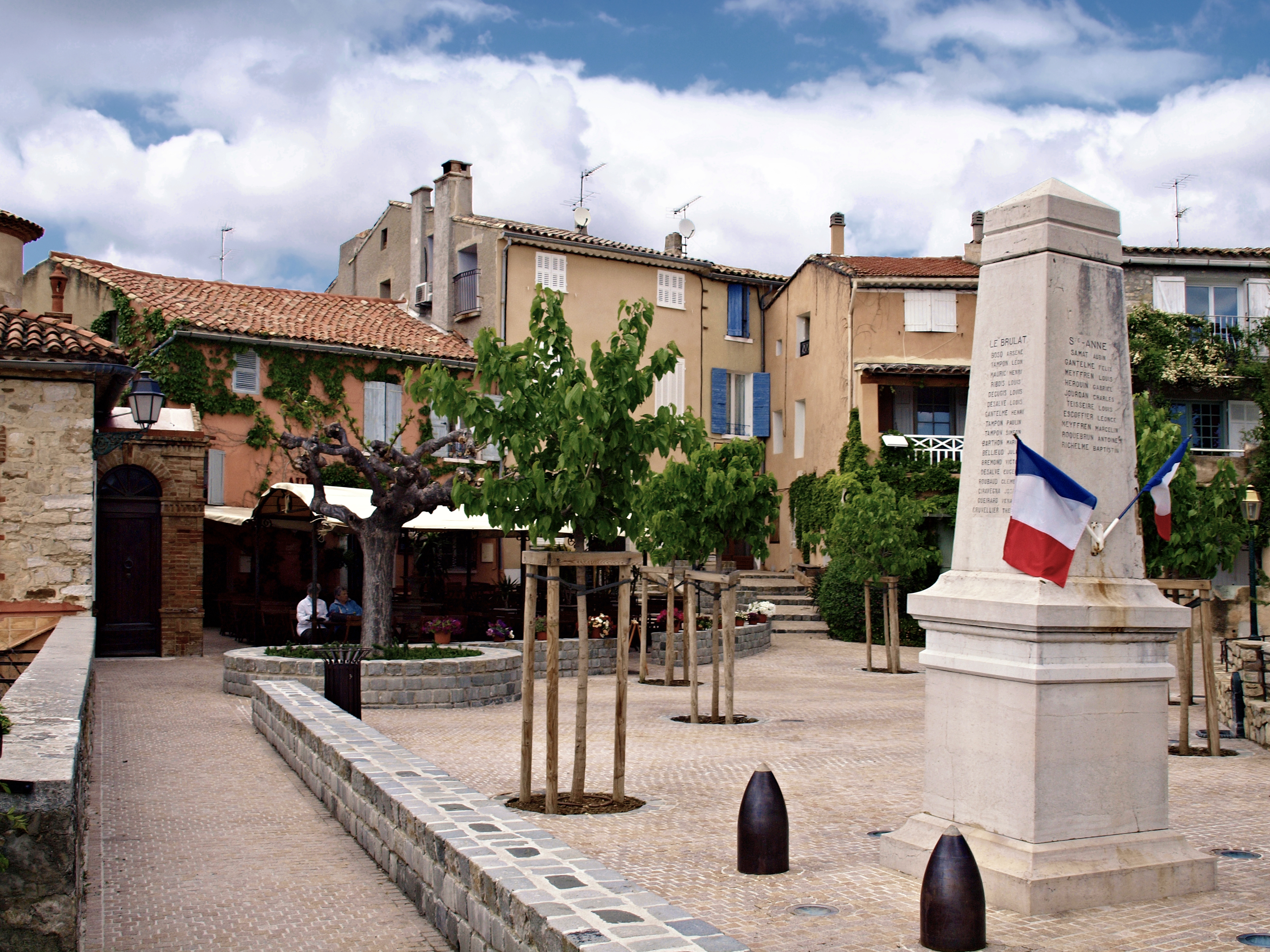
- Square in Le Castellet

- Coat of arms
- Location of Le Castellet
- Location within France Location within Provence-Alpes-Côte d'Azur
- Coordinates: 43°12′13″N 5°46′38″E
- Country: France
- Region: Provence-Alpes-Côte d'Azur
- Department: Var
- Arrondissement: Toulon
- Canton: Saint-Cyr-sur-Mer
- Intercommunality: CA Sud Sainte Baume

Government
  - Mayor (2020–2026): René Castell
- Area^{1}: 44.77 km^{2} (17.29 sq mi)
- Elevation: 300 m (980 ft)
- Highest elevation: 503 m (1,650 ft)
- Lowest elevation: 21 m (69 ft)
- Population (2023): 6,040
  - Density: 135/km^{2} (349/sq mi)
- Time zone: UTC+01:00 (CET)
  - Summer (DST): UTC+02:00 (CEST)
- INSEE/Postal code: 83035 /83330
- Dialling codes: 0494
- ^{1} French Land Register data, which excludes lakes, ponds, glaciers > 1 km^{2} (0.386 sq mi or 247 acres) and river estuaries.

Le Castellet (French pronunciation: [lə kastəlɛ]; Occitan: Lo Castelet) is a commune in the Var department of the Provence-Alpes-Côte d'Azur region in Southeastern France. It consists of a small feudal village perched on a cliff edge and its surroundings. It is situated north-west of Toulon next to La Cadière-d'Azur and Le Beausset. It is surrounded by vineyards and is part of the Côtes de Provence Appellation d'origine contrôlée (AOC) of Bandol. It is a member of Les Plus Beaux Villages de France (The Most Beautiful Villages of France) Association. The Circuit Paul Ricard is also located in the commune.

== Geography ==
=== Climate ===
Le Castellet has a hot-summer Mediterranean climate (Köppen climate classification Csa). The average annual temperature in Le Castellet is 13.7 °C (56.7 °F). The average annual rainfall is 689.7 mm (27.15 in) with November as the wettest month. The temperatures are highest on average in July, at around 22.6 °C (72.7 °F), and lowest in January, at around 6.4 °C (43.5 °F). The highest temperature ever recorded in Le Castellet was 37.1 °C (98.8 °F) on 5 August 2017; the coldest temperature ever recorded was −11.0 °C (12.2 °F) on 7 March 1971.

Climate data for Le Castellet (1991−2020 normals, extremes 1969−present)
Month	Jan	Feb	Mar	Apr	May	Jun	Jul	Aug	Sep	Oct	Nov	Dec	Year
Record high °C (°F)	20.4 (68.7)	21.1 (70.0)	24.1 (75.4)	26.9 (80.4)	31.6 (88.9)	35.3 (95.5)	36.0 (96.8)	37.1 (98.8)	32.0 (89.6)	28.2 (82.8)	23.5 (74.3)	21.5 (70.7)	37.1 (98.8)
Mean daily maximum °C (°F)	10.5 (50.9)	11.0 (51.8)	13.9 (57.0)	16.6 (61.9)	20.9 (69.6)	25.2 (77.4)	28.1 (82.6)	27.9 (82.2)	23.2 (73.8)	18.8 (65.8)	13.9 (57.0)	11.0 (51.8)	18.4 (65.1)
Daily mean °C (°F)	6.4 (43.5)	6.5 (43.7)	9.2 (48.6)	11.8 (53.2)	15.8 (60.4)	19.9 (67.8)	22.6 (72.7)	22.5 (72.5)	18.4 (65.1)	14.6 (58.3)	10.0 (50.0)	7.2 (45.0)	13.7 (56.7)
Mean daily minimum °C (°F)	2.3 (36.1)	2.0 (35.6)	4.4 (39.9)	7.0 (44.6)	10.8 (51.4)	14.7 (58.5)	17.1 (62.8)	17.1 (62.8)	13.6 (56.5)	10.8 (51.4)	6.1 (43.0)	3.2 (37.8)	9.1 (48.4)
Record low °C (°F)	−9.0 (15.8)	−9.5 (14.9)	−11.0 (12.2)	−4.0 (24.8)	−0.3 (31.5)	5.0 (41.0)	7.0 (44.6)	7.5 (45.5)	3.0 (37.4)	−2.7 (27.1)	−7.0 (19.4)	−8.6 (16.5)	−11.0 (12.2)
Average precipitation mm (inches)	72.8 (2.87)	43.7 (1.72)	47.9 (1.89)	63.8 (2.51)	48.4 (1.91)	31.4 (1.24)	12.1 (0.48)	22.1 (0.87)	80.0 (3.15)	95.1 (3.74)	102.9 (4.05)	69.5 (2.74)	689.7 (27.15)
Average precipitation days (≥ 1.0 mm)	6.0	5.4	4.9	6.2	4.9	3.6	1.4	2.2	4.9	7.0	8.0	5.9	60.3
Source: Météo-France

== Population ==
Historical population
Year	Pop.	±% p.a.
1968	1,229	—
1975	2,048	+7.57%
1982	2,332	+1.87%
1990	3,084	+3.56%
1999	3,799	+2.34%
2007	4,252	+1.42%
2012	4,083	−0.81%
2017	3,886	−0.98%
2023	6,040	+7.63%
Source: INSEE

== Cinema ==
Le Castellet was the setting for the film The Baker's Wife (French: La femme du boulanger), starring Raimu and directed by Marcel Pagnol.

== Gallery ==
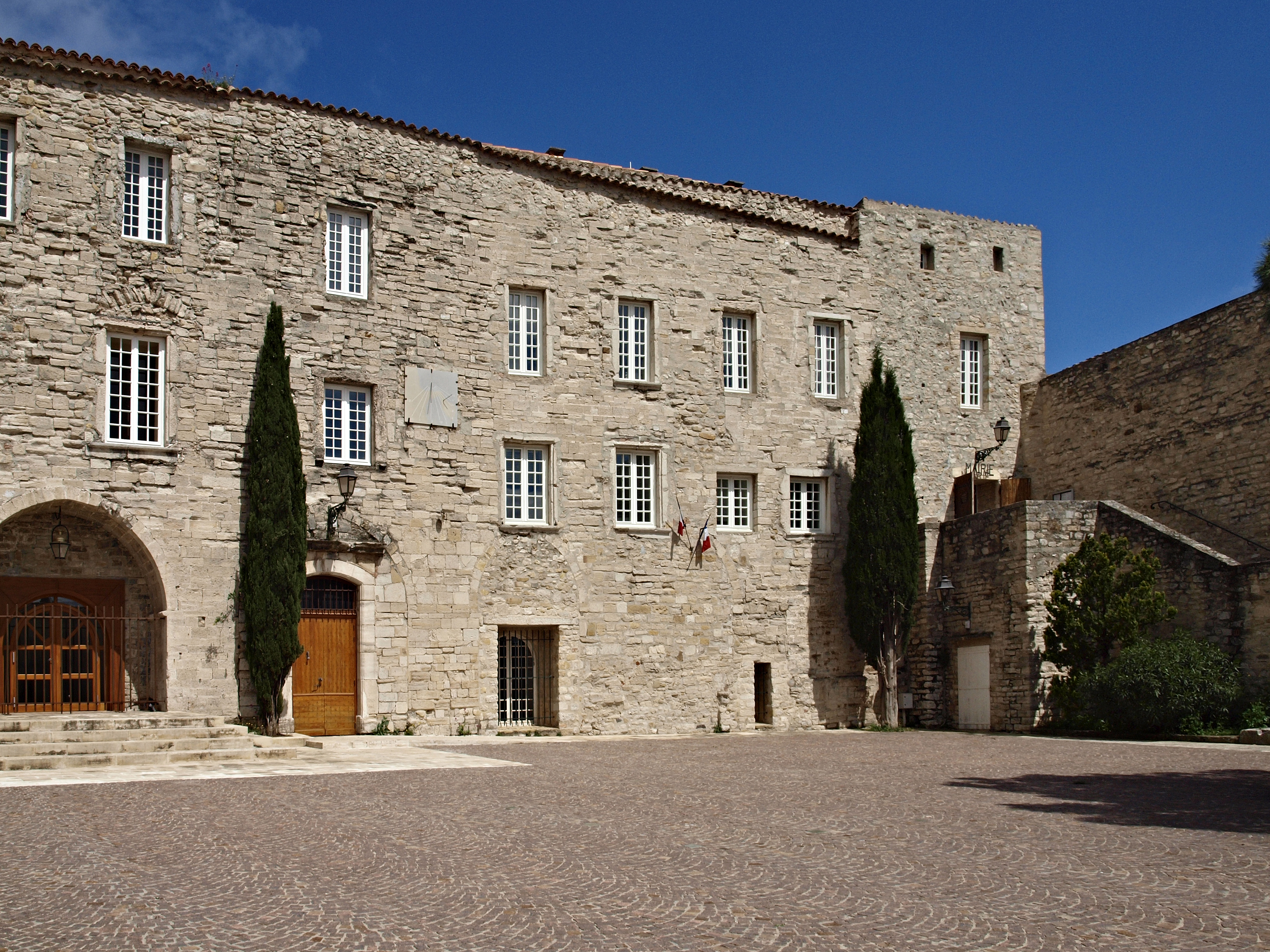
Le Castellet Town Hall

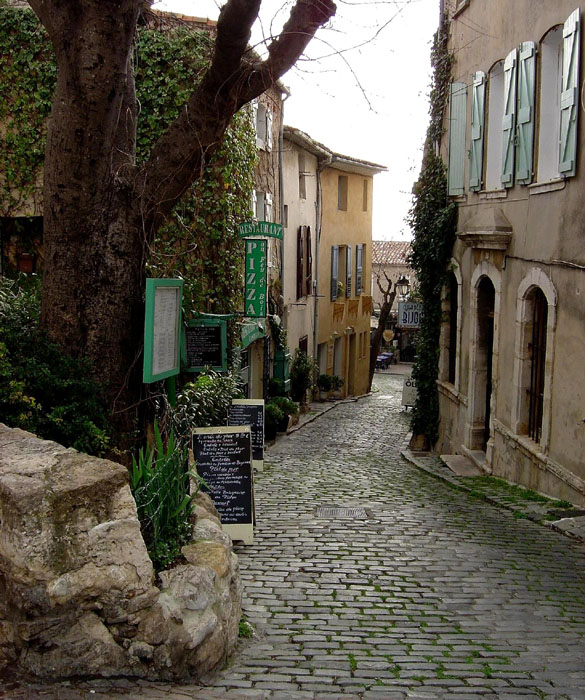
Street in the village

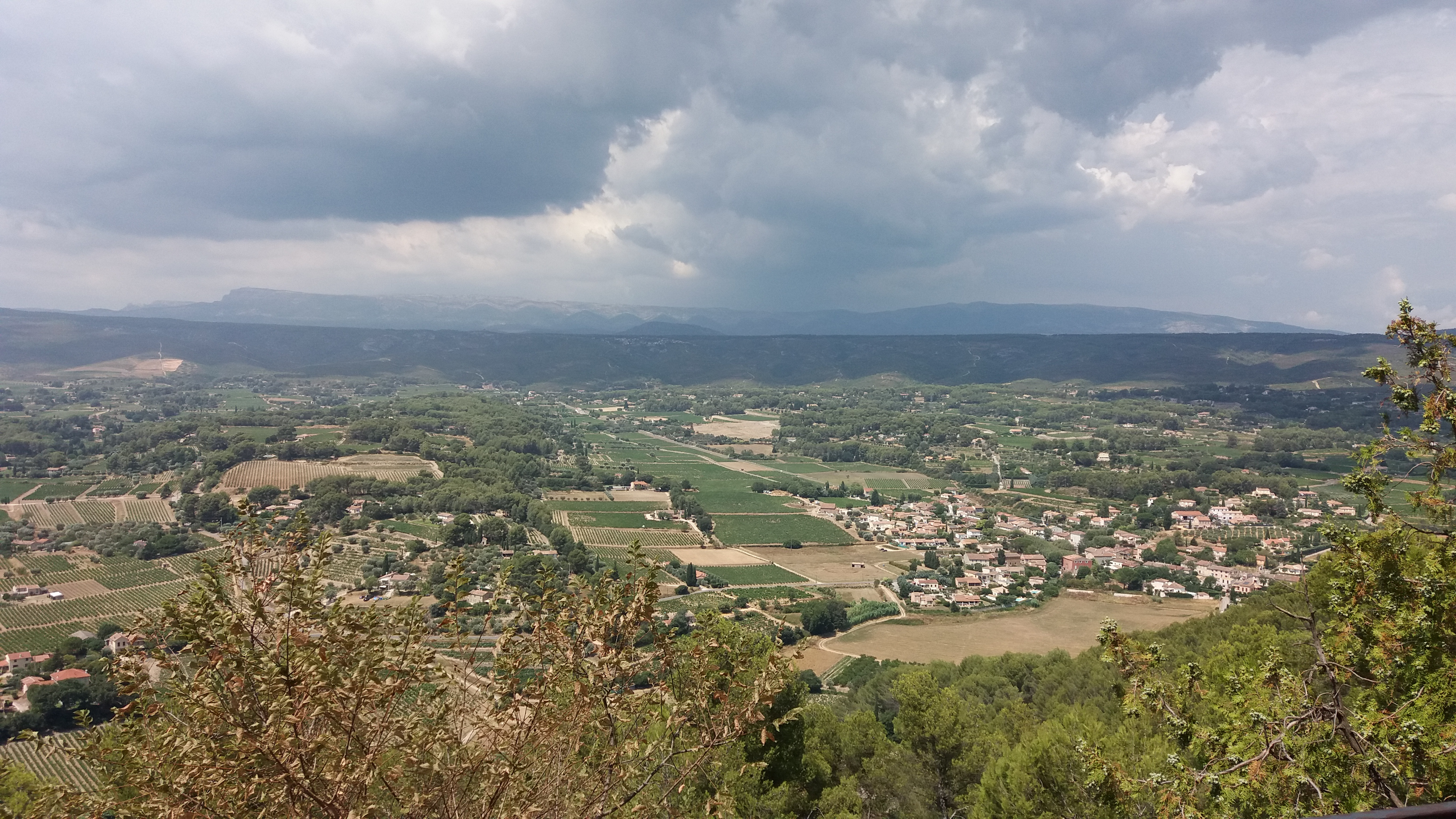
View of the commune

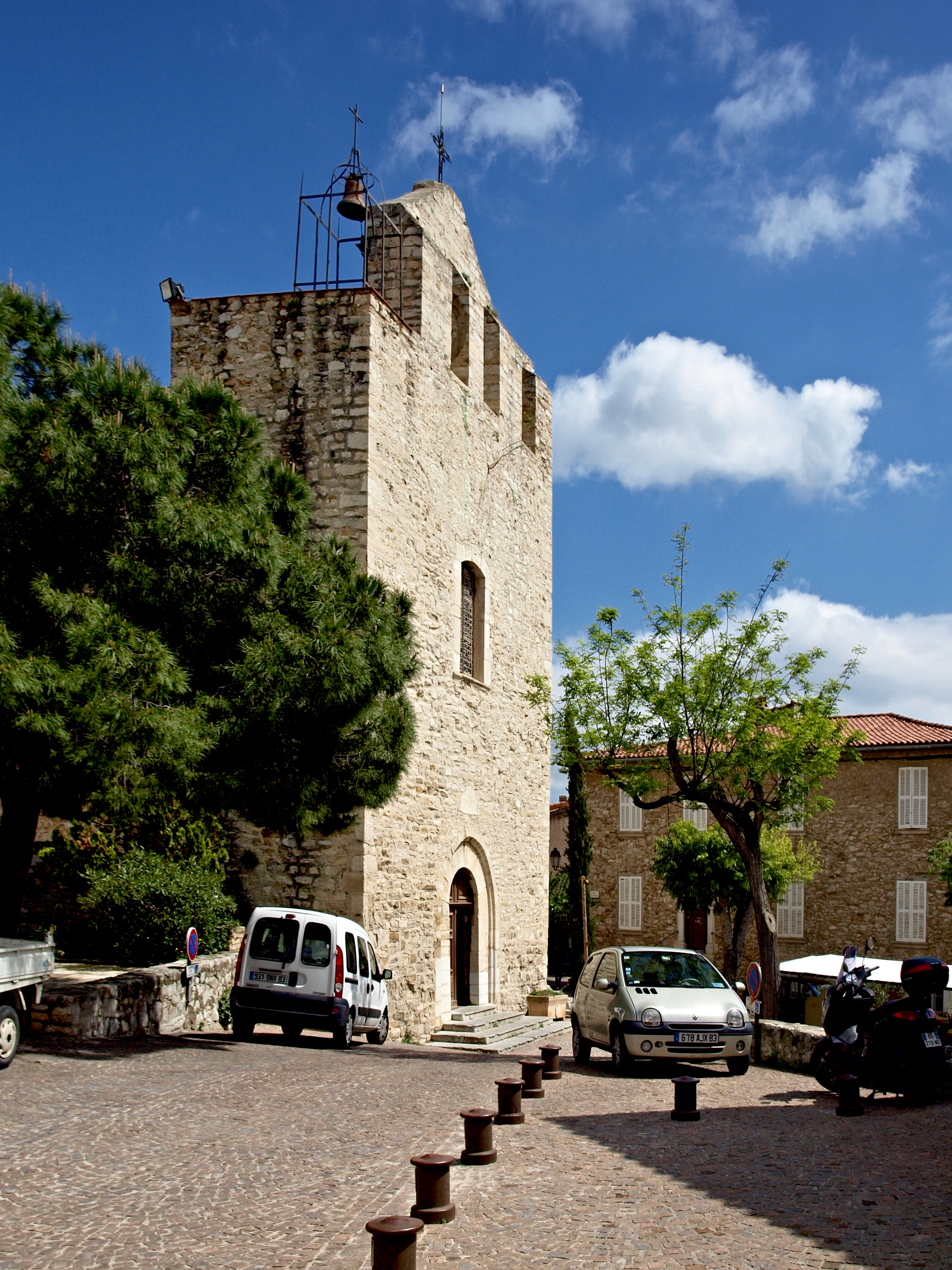
Church in Le Castellet

== See also ==
- Communes of the Var department
