= Canton of Saint-Cyr-sur-Mer =

Administrative division of Var, France

Coordinates: 43.18°N 5.71°E

A map of the canton of Saint-Cyr-sur-Mer in the Var department

The canton of Saint-Cyr-sur-Mer (French: Canton de Saint-Cyr-sur-Mer) is a canton (an administrative division) of the Var department in Southeastern France. Its seat is Saint-Cyr-sur-Mer. It was created at the canton reorganisation that came into effect in March 2015. Since then it elects two members of the Departmental Council of Var.

== Composition ==
The canton of Saint-Cyr-sur-Mer consists of the following communes:

1. Le Beausset
2. La Cadière-d'Azur
3. Le Castellet
4. Nans-les-Pins
5. Plan-d'Aups-Sainte-Baume
6. Riboux
7. Saint-Cyr-sur-Mer
8. Saint-Zacharie
9. Signes

Six communes are part of the arrondissement of Toulon, three (Nans-les-Pins, Plan-d'Aups-Sainte-Baume and Saint-Zacharie) are part of the arrondissement of Brignoles.
