= Sanary-sur-Mer =

Sanary-sur-Mer Sant Nari (Occitan)
- Commune
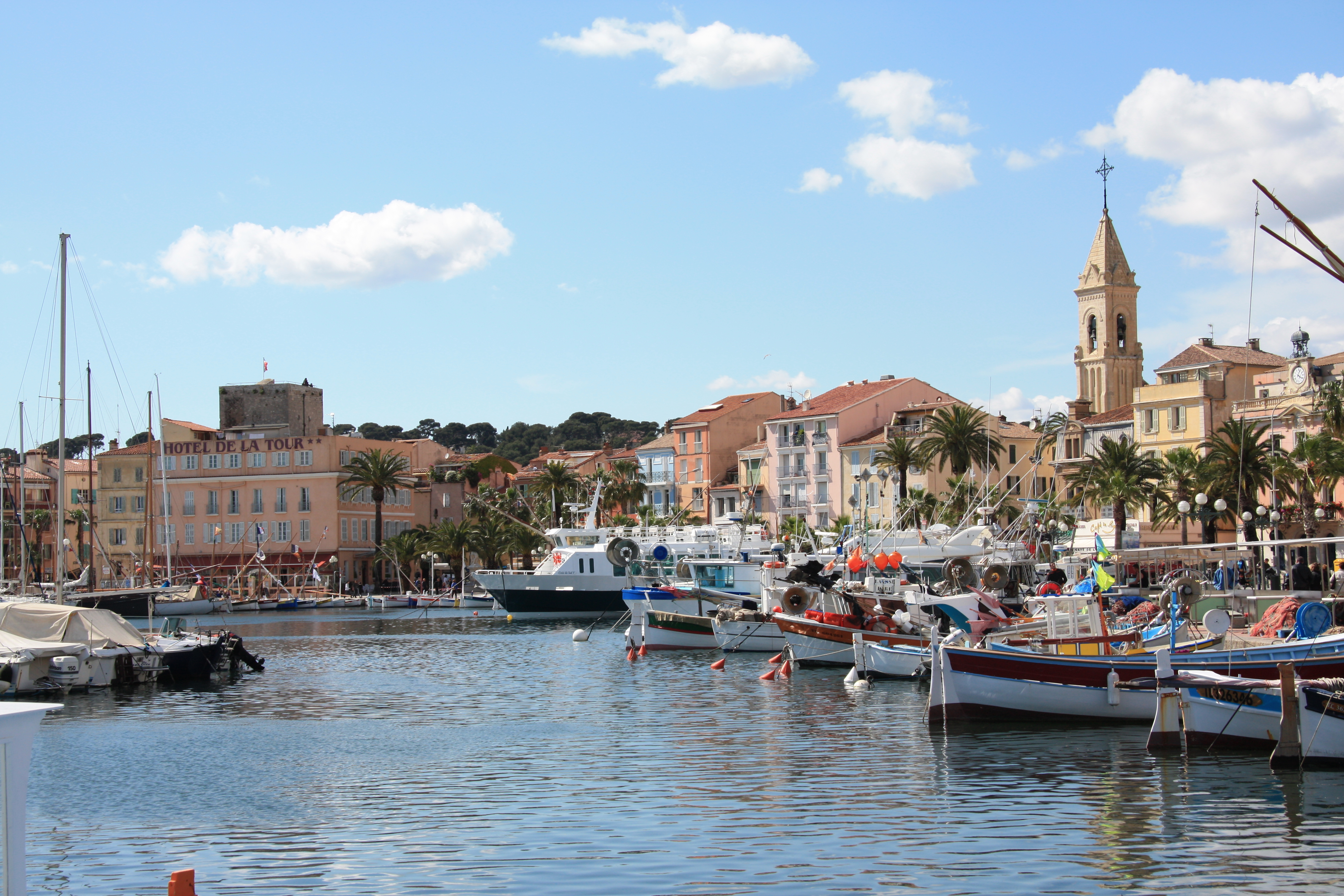
- Waterfront in Sanary-sur-Mer

- Coat of arms
- Location of Sanary-sur-Mer
- Location within France Location within Provence-Alpes-Côte d'Azur
- Coordinates: 43°07′05″N 5°48′05″E
- Country: France
- Region: Provence-Alpes-Côte d'Azur
- Department: Var
- Arrondissement: Toulon
- Canton: Ollioules
- Intercommunality: CA Sud Sainte Baume

Government
  - Mayor (2021–2026): Daniel Alsters
- Area^{1}: 19.24 km^{2} (7.43 sq mi)
- Highest elevation: 429 m (1,407 ft)
- Lowest elevation: 0 m (0 ft)
- Population (2023): 18,538
  - Density: 963.5/km^{2} (2,495/sq mi)
- Time zone: UTC+01:00 (CET)
  - Summer (DST): UTC+02:00 (CEST)
- INSEE/Postal code: 83123 /83110
- Website: sanarysurmer.com
- ^{1} French Land Register data, which excludes lakes, ponds, glaciers > 1 km^{2} (0.386 sq mi or 247 acres) and river estuaries.

Sanary-sur-Mer (French pronunciation: [sanaʁi syʁ mɛʁ]; lit. 'Sanary-on-Sea'; Occitan: Sant Nari), popularly known as Sanary, is a resort town and commune in the Var department in the Provence-Alpes-Côte d'Azur region, Southeastern France. Sanary-sur-Mer is located in coastal Provence on the Mediterranean Sea, 13 km (8.1 mi) west of Toulon and 49 km (30 mi) southeast of Marseille. It can be reached from Paris by TGV in less than four hours. In high season there are direct flights to nearby Toulon–Hyères Airport from London, Oslo, Brussels and Rotterdam.

== History ==
The seafront location was part of the commune of Ollioules. In the 16th century the seigneur established a fishing village here, clustered around the medieval watchtower, under the protection of Sanct Nazari of Lérins Abbey. The port was constructed and the harbour deepened in the mid-16th century. The little fishing port known in the Provençal dialect of Occitan (or in Provençal if considered as a distinct language) as 'Sant Nazari', later 'Sant Nàri', contracted later on as 'Sanàri', was finally granted its independence from Ollioules by Louis XIV on 10 July 1688. On 12 November 1890 it officially received its Francised name, 'Sanary', which was formalised and distinguished as 'sur-Mer' (on Sea) on 27 July 1923.

As a tourist rendezvous, the village underwent a strong decade of growth in the 1980s. Sanary-sur-Mer's coastline has a number of small beaches; it is an active village all year round, unlike most small towns on the Mediterranean coast. Sanary-sur-Mer is one of the sunniest places in France, with an average of only 61 days of rain, mostly in winter, as well as major solar radiation (6,156 MJ/m2/yr), comparable to Sicily. It is regularly swept by the Mistral, a strong wind coming from the Rhône Valley, which brings low humidity around 20%, gusts up to 130 km/h (81 mph), cool temperatures, sun and deep blue skies. Wind is near gale force or higher on average 115 days per year (storm force eight days per year), making Sanary a favourite destination for windsurfers.

== Population ==
Historical population
Year	Pop.	±% p.a.
1968	8,851	—
1975	10,264	+2.14%
1982	11,505	+1.64%
1990	14,730	+3.14%
1999	16,995	+1.60%
2007	17,774	+0.56%
2012	16,062	−2.01%
2017	16,605	+0.67%
2023	18,538	+1.85%
Source: INSEE

== Main sights ==
- Chapelle Notre-Dame-de-Pitié: From this chapel built in 1560 on a headland west of the town, the visitor sees a broad view over the bay of Sanary. It has a large number of ex-voto votive offerings.
- Église Saint Nazaire: A Gothic Revival church of the late 19th century, Michel Pacha, architect.
- Tour romane: A medieval construction, circa 1300.
- Port: Sanary has a large collection of traditional wooden fishing boats, mainly the local "pointus". It also has a small fleet of artisan fishermen, who sell their catch every morning.
- Portissol: The nicest beach in Sanary.
- Market: Every morning there is a Provençal market under the plane trees, with much fresh produce.

Jacques Cousteau had a house in Sanary, the Villa Baobab. He was a pioneer of deep sea diving equipment, which he invented and developed around Sanary. The Frédéric Dumas International Diving Museum (Musée Frédéric-Dumas) is in a 13th-century Romanesque tower made available by the municipality; it bills itself as an historical city of diving. Frédéric Dumas was a co-inventor with Cousteau of the aqua-lung.

Sanary was the birthplace of Ernest Blanc (1923–2010), a distinguished operatic baritone who enjoyed a long international career.

Sanary hosts every year during the month of May the international photography festival Photomed, now also held in parallel in Beirut.

== Literary Sanary ==
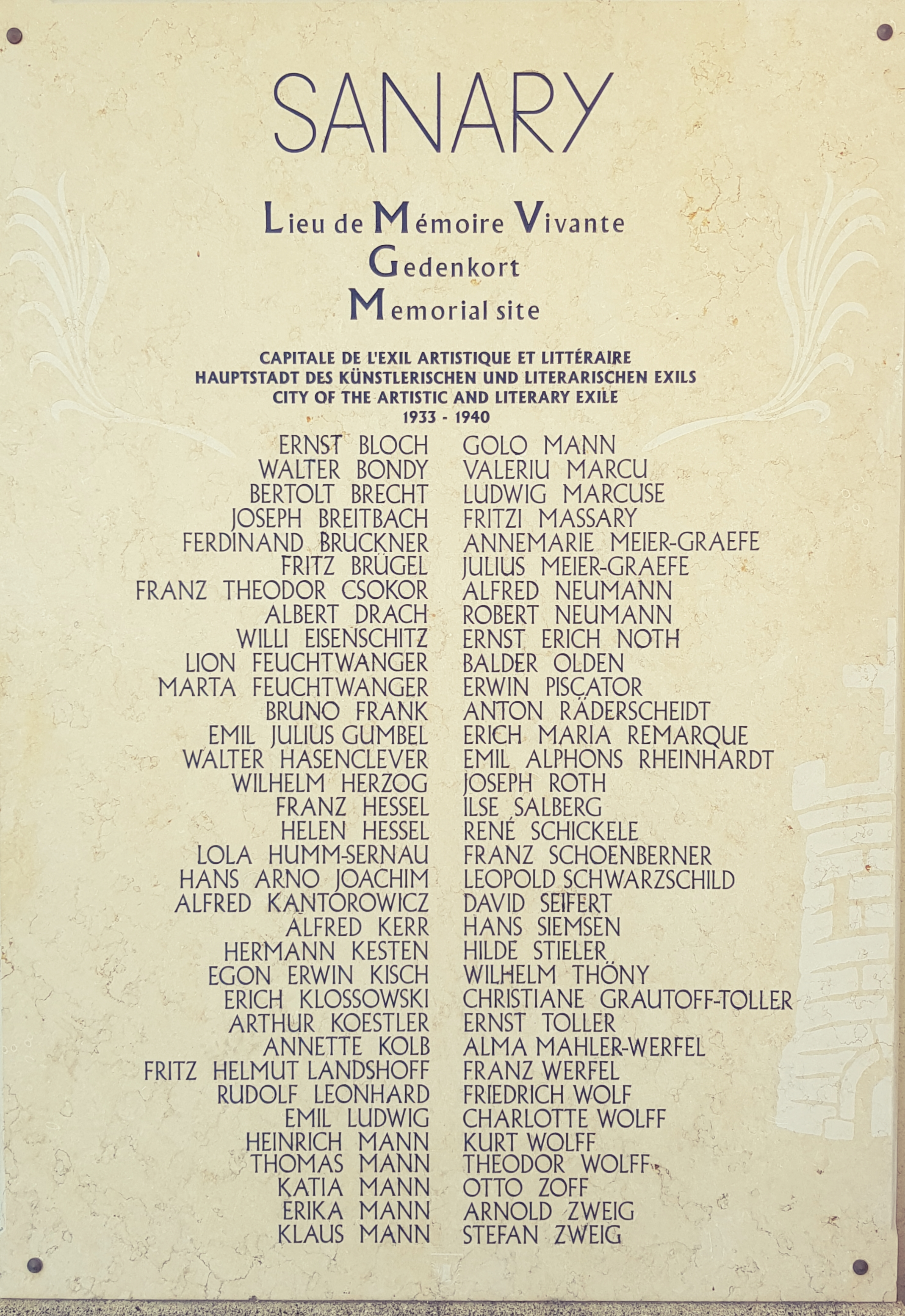
Plaque commemorating the German and Austrian exiles (2011 updated/corrected)

With the rise of Nazism in the early 1930s, a great number of German writers and intellectuals left Germany and settled here: the playwright Bertolt Brecht, Egon Kisch, Thomas Mann, Ludwig Marcuse, Joseph Roth, Franz Werfel and his wife Alma Mahler at Le Moulin Gris (near the Chapelle Notre-Dame-de-Pitié), Lion Feuchtwanger at Villa Lazare then at Villa Valmer, and Arnold Zweig. Patronised by Jean Cocteau and his coterie, Sanary had already drawn Aldous Huxley, who wrote Brave New World at Villa Huxley, and his wife, Maria; they attracted other English visitors, such as D. H. Lawrence and his wife, Frieda; Julian Huxley and his wife, Juliette; and others.

The German expatriates clustered around Thomas Mann and his large family, his brother Heinrich and his second wife Nelly, the writers Stefan Zweig and Arnold Zweig, the art critic Julius Meier-Graefe, and the artist René Schickele. Sybille von Schoenebeck (later Sybille Bedford, the author of A Legacy 1956) lived here with her mother, Elisabeth Bernhardt. Ludwig Marcuse in his book Mein Zwanzigstes Jahrhundert (p. 160) wrote about Sanary: Wir wohnten im Paradies – notgedrungen ("We lived in paradise – against our will").

"If one lives in exile", wrote Hermann Kesten, "The café becomes at once the family home, the nation, church and parliament, a desert and a place of pilgrimage, cradle of illusions and their cemetery... In exile, the café is the one place where life goes on."

== Wartime detention of exiles ==
With the declaration of war in 1939, the French government treated these exiles as enemy aliens and interned some of them in camps like the concentration Camp des Milles near Aix-en-Provence, and eventually some were sent to Auschwitz. After the liberation of France, the whole episode went ignored until the 1990s when, perhaps thanks to the increasing number of tourists from Germany, a commemorative plaque was unveiled, and literary itineraries were signposted.

== International relations ==
Sanary-sur-Mer is twinned with:

- Luino, Italy, since 2001
- Bad Säckingen, Germany, since 1973
- Purkersdorf, Austria, since 1973
- Hongcheon, South Korea, since 1986
- Kościerzyna, Poland, since 1990
- Noginsk, Russia, since 2010

== See also ==
- Communes of the Var department
