= Nans-les-Pins =

- Commune
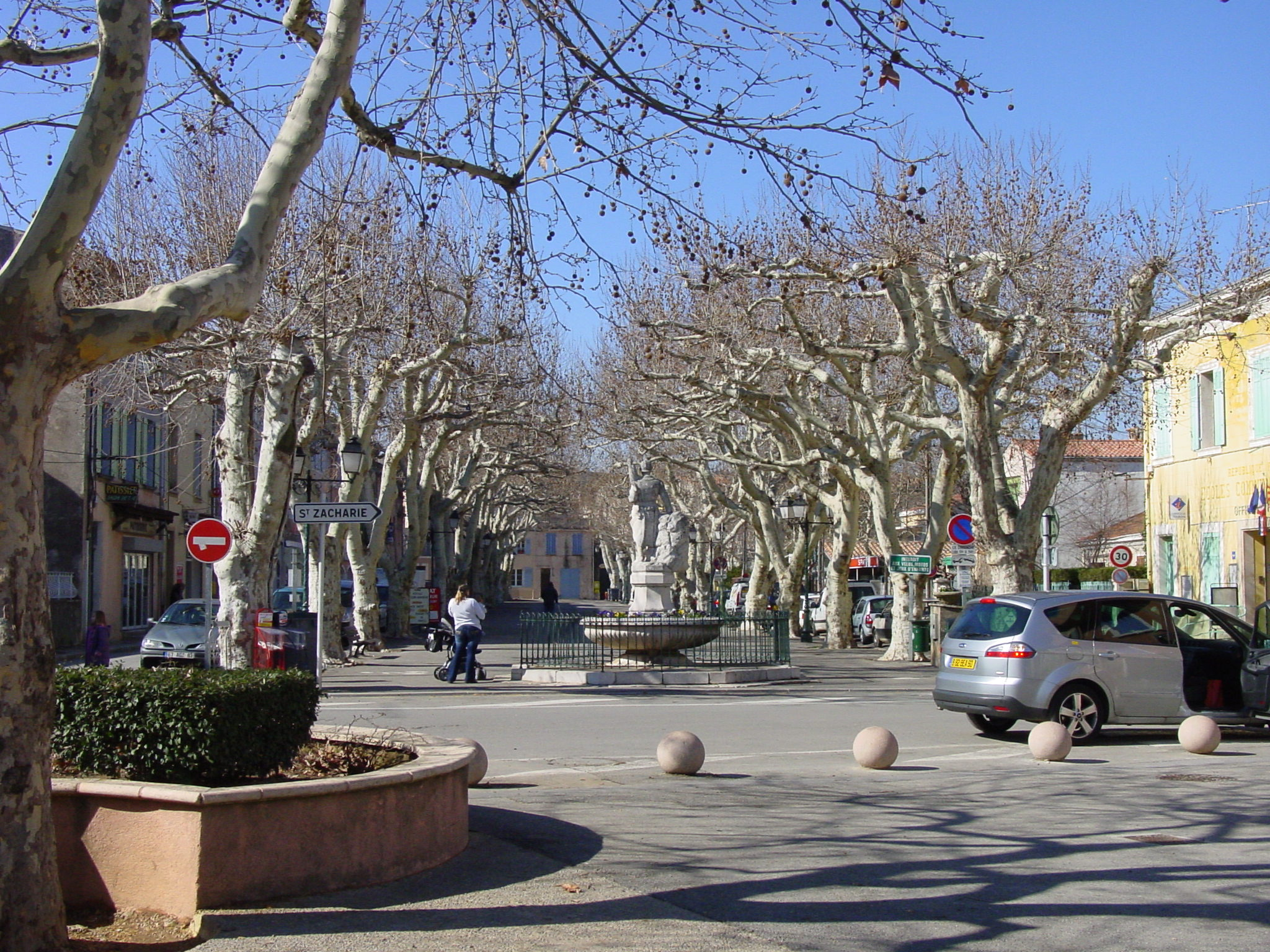
- A view within the village

- Coat of arms
- Location of Nans-les-Pins
- Location within France Location within Provence-Alpes-Côte d'Azur
- Coordinates: 43°22′13″N 5°46′55″E
- Country: France
- Region: Provence-Alpes-Côte d'Azur
- Department: Var
- Arrondissement: Brignoles
- Canton: Saint-Cyr-sur-Mer
- Intercommunality: CA Provence Verte

Government
  - Mayor (2020–2026): Ollivier Artuphel
- Area^{1}: 47.99 km^{2} (18.53 sq mi)
- Highest elevation: 772 m (2,533 ft)
- Lowest elevation: 308 m (1,010 ft)
- Population (2023): 5,215
  - Density: 108.7/km^{2} (281.5/sq mi)
- Time zone: UTC+01:00 (CET)
  - Summer (DST): UTC+02:00 (CEST)
- INSEE/Postal code: 83087 /83860
- ^{1} French Land Register data, which excludes lakes, ponds, glaciers > 1 km^{2} (0.386 sq mi or 247 acres) and river estuaries.

Nans-les-Pins (French pronunciation: [nɑ̃s le pɛ̃]; Occitan: Nans) is a commune in the Var department in the Provence-Alpes-Côte d'Azur region in southeastern France. It lies in the western part of the department, north of the Sainte-Baume ridge.

The town sits about 1 km north and 100m downhill from its former location, now known as Vieux Nans ("Old Nans"). Old Nans was centered on a castle, first built in the 8th Century AD, and was abandoned for the new site in the 15th Century. It is possible to explore the remains of the old town and castle on foot.

Nans-les-Pins sits on the pilgrimage route to Sainte-Baume, and grew beyond a small village in the 19th Century. It is the starting point for a marked hiking route to the source of the Huveaune river. There is an 18-hole golf course and a Marvilla Parks campsite in the town.

== Population ==
Historical population
Year	Pop.	±% p.a.
1968	813	—
1975	953	+2.30%
1982	1,347	+5.07%
1990	2,485	+7.96%
1999	3,159	+2.70%
2007	3,995	+2.98%
2012	4,153	+0.78%
2017	4,627	+2.19%
2023	5,215	+2.01%
Source: INSEE

== See also ==
- Communes of the Var department
