= Communauté d'agglomération Sud Sainte Baume =

Sud Sainte Baume
- Communauté d'agglomération
- Interactive map of Sud Sainte Baume
- Coordinates: 43°12′N 05°45′E
- Country: France
- Region: Provence-Alpes-Côte d'Azur
- Department: Var
- No. of communes: {{{nbcomm}}}
- Established: 1994
- Area: 355.6 km^{2} (137.3 sq mi)
- Population (2019): 61,460
  - Density: 172.8/km^{2} (447.6/sq mi)
- Website: www.agglo-sudsaintebaume.fr

Communauté d'agglomération Sud Sainte Baume is a communauté d'agglomération, an intercommunal structure, in the Var department, in the Provence-Alpes-Côte d'Azur region, southeastern France. Its name refers to the Sainte-Baume mountain ridge. Created in 1994, its seat is in La Cadière-d'Azur. Its area is 355.6 km^{2}. Its population was 61,460 in 2019.

== History ==
The communauté de communes is the oldest inter-communal institution in the Var department with the ability to collect taxes, having been instituted on 25 July 1994, initially with 6 communes (Le Beausset, La Cadière-d'Azur, Le Castellet, Évenos, Riboux and Signes). In 2002, the commune of Saint-Cyr-sur-Mer joined the communauté, with Bandol joining in 2011 and Sanary-sur-Mer in 2013.

On 1 January 2015, the communauté gained its current name and legal designation.

== Geography ==
The communauté borders the Aix-Marseille-Provence Metropolis to the west, the Communauté d'agglomération de la Provence Verte to the north, the Communauté de communes de la Vallée du Gapeau to the east and the Métropole Toulon Provence Méditerranée to the south-east.

== Composition ==
The communauté d'agglomération consists of the following 9 communes:

Commune	INSEE code	Area (km^{2})	Population (2020)	Population density (per km^{2})
Bandol	83009	8.59	8359	973
Riboux	83105	13.48	51	3.8
Sanary-sur-Mer	83123	19.23	17 173	893
Saint-Cyr-sur-Mer	83112	21.15	12 058	570
Le Beausset	83016	35.95	9 802	273
La Cadière-d'Azur (seat)	83027	37.42	5 548	148
Évenos	83053	41.95	2 407	57
Le Castellet	83035	44.77	4 578	102
Signes	83127	133.1	2 992	22
