= Saint-Cyr-sur-Mer =

Saint-Cyr-sur-Mer Sant Ceri (Occitan)
- Commune
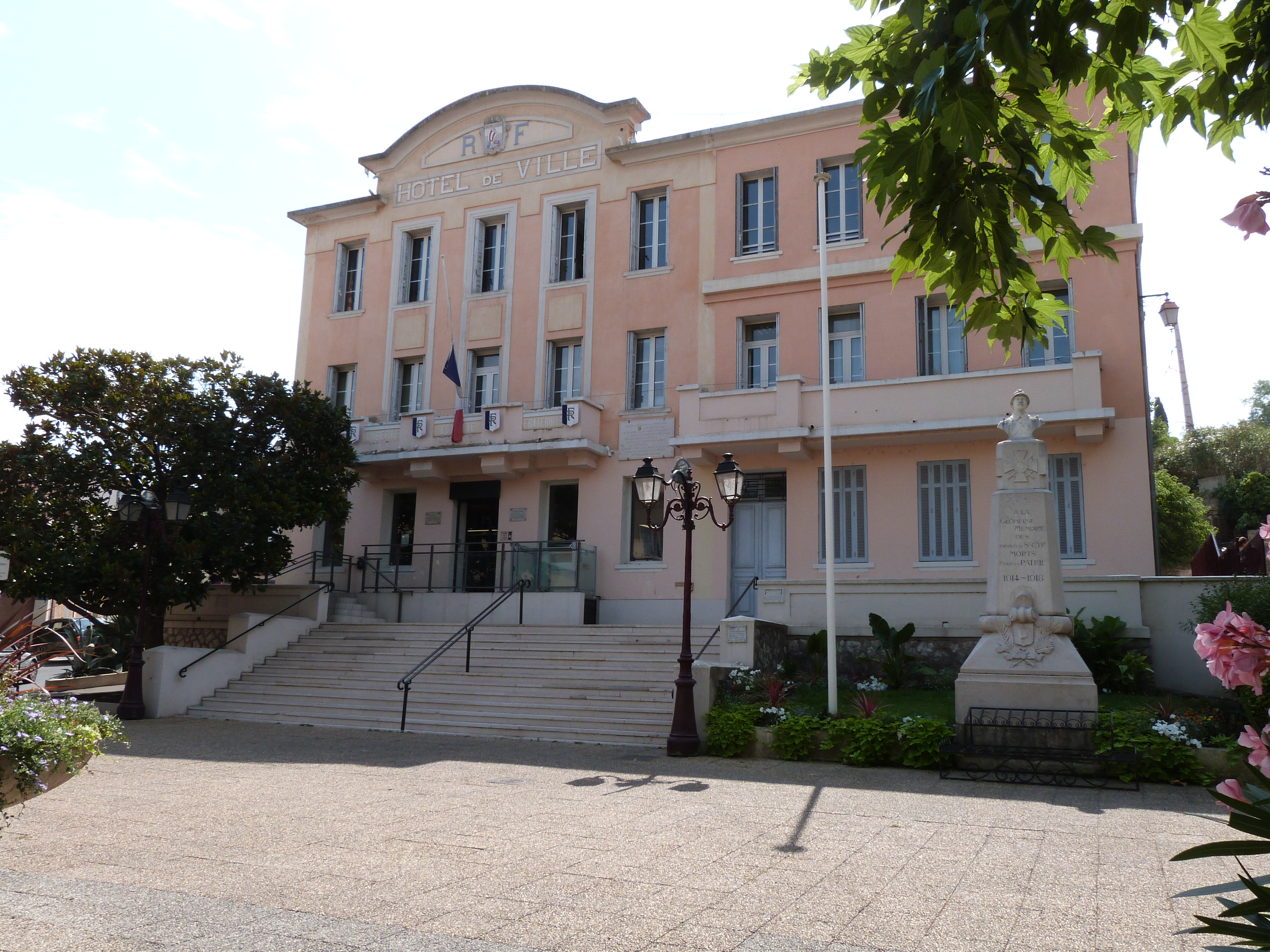
- Saint-Cyr-sur-Mer Town Hall

- Coat of arms
- Location of Saint-Cyr-sur-Mer
- Location within France Location within Provence-Alpes-Côte d'Azur
- Coordinates: 43°10′44″N 5°42′31″E
- Country: France
- Region: Provence-Alpes-Côte d'Azur
- Department: Var
- Arrondissement: Toulon
- Canton: Saint-Cyr-sur-Mer
- Intercommunality: CA Sud Sainte Baume

Government
  - Mayor (2020–2026): Philippe Barthélemy
- Area^{1}: 21.15 km^{2} (8.17 sq mi)
- Highest elevation: 254 m (833 ft)
- Lowest elevation: 0 m (0 ft)
- Population (2023): 11,658
  - Density: 551.2/km^{2} (1,428/sq mi)
- Demonym: Saint-Cyriens
- Time zone: UTC+01:00 (CET)
  - Summer (DST): UTC+02:00 (CEST)
- INSEE/Postal code: 83112 /83270
- Website: www.saintcyrsurmer.fr
- ^{1} French Land Register data, which excludes lakes, ponds, glaciers > 1 km^{2} (0.386 sq mi or 247 acres) and river estuaries.

Saint-Cyr-sur-Mer (French pronunciation: [sɛ̃ siʁ syʁ mɛʁ], lit. "Saint-Cyr-on-Sea"; Provençal Occitan: Sant Ceri) is a commune in the Var department in the Provence-Alpes-Côte d'Azur region in Southeastern France. It is located on the Mediterranean coast, on the departmental border with Bouches-du-Rhône.

Saint-Cyr-sur-Mer neighbours the communes of La Ciotat to the west, Bandol to the east and La Cadière-d'Azur to the north. In addition to the urban centre of Saint-Cyr itself, the commune includes the communities of Les Lecques, a port and beach resort, as well as La Madrague, a small port. The town square of Saint-Cyr contains a replica of the Statue of Liberty donated by Frédéric Bartholdi, sculptor of the original.

== Population ==
Historical population
Year	Pop.	±% p.a.
1968	4,126	—
1975	4,728	+1.96%
1982	5,685	+2.67%
1990	7,033	+2.70%
1999	8,898	+2.65%
2007	11,795	+3.59%
2012	11,755	−0.07%
2017	11,761	+0.01%
2023	11,658	−0.15%
Source: INSEE

== Transport ==
Saint-Cyr-sur-Mer is served by the Saint-Cyr-Les Lecques – La Cadière SNCF station on the Marseille–Ventimiglia railway.

== Economy ==
Agriculture and tourism are important industries in the area. Fruit (especially olives), vegetables, as well as wine are produced in the commune. Both Saint-Cyr-sur-Mer and Les Lecques have urban markets. Tourist attractions include the sandy beach at Les Lecques, the coastal footpaths and the Musée de Tauroentum, a museum which displays artifacts from the Roman site of 'Tauroentum'.

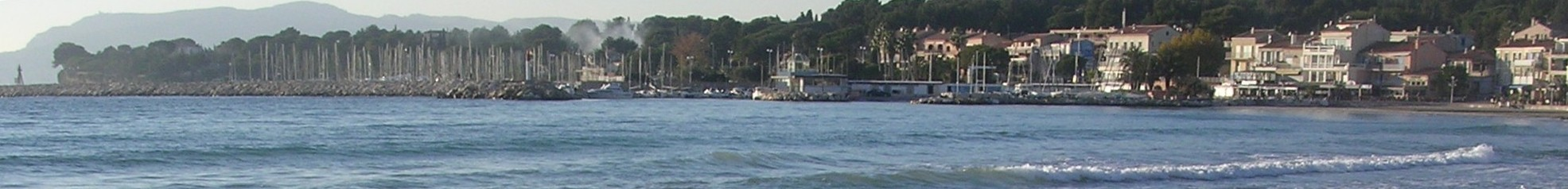
Panorama of Les Lecques from its beach with view on the old and new port.

== Twin towns ==
Saint-Cyr-sur-Mer is twinned with:

- Città della Pieve, Italy
- Denzlingen, Germany

== See also ==
- Communes of the Var department
