= Arrondissement of Toulon =

Coordinates: 43.12°N 5.93°E

Toulon
- Arrondissement
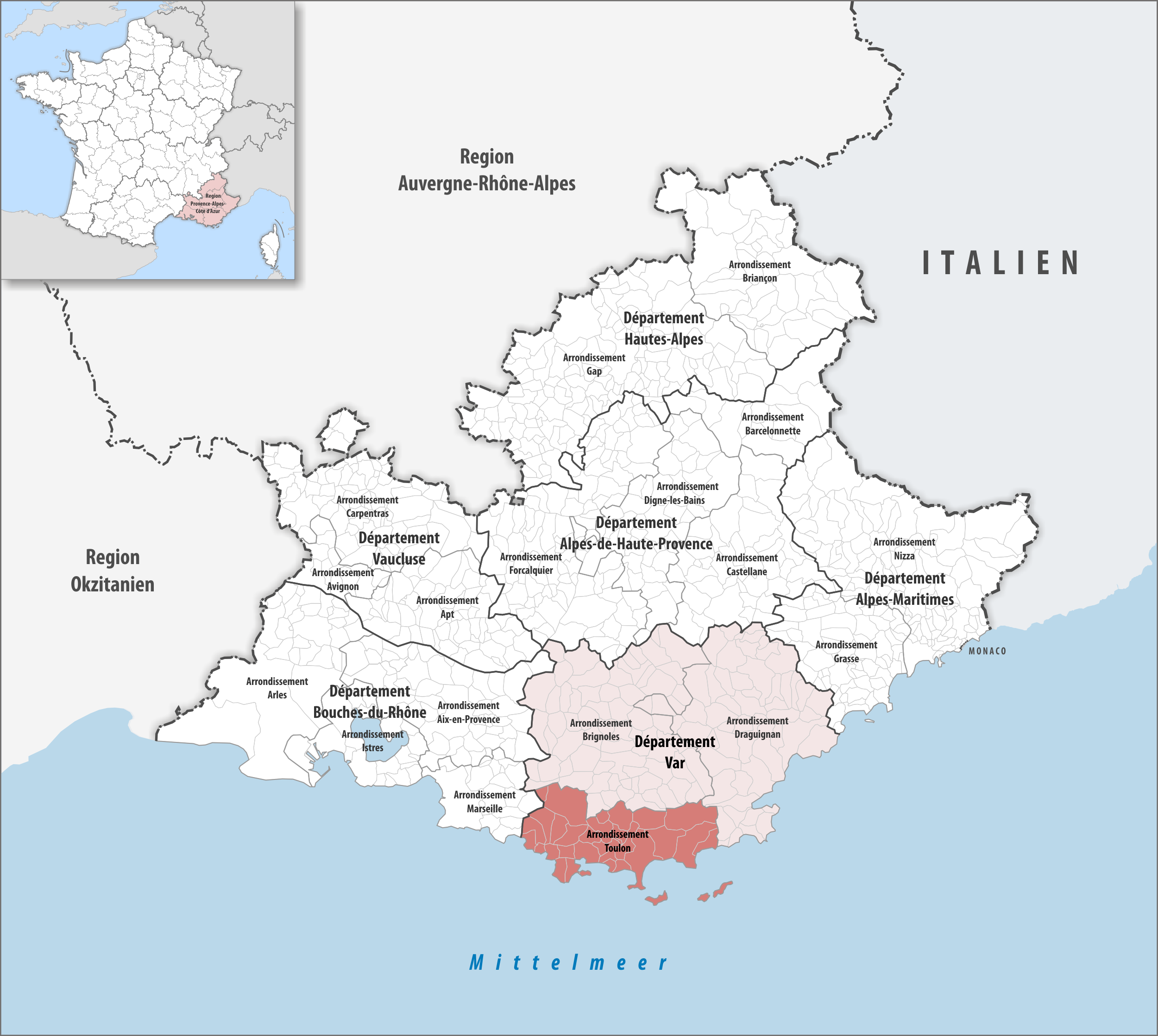
- Location within the region Provence-Alpes-Côte d'Azur
- Country: France
- Region: Provence-Alpes-Côte d'Azur
- Department: Var
- No. of communes: {{{nbcomm}}}
- Area: 1,233.5 km^{2} (476.3 sq mi)
- Population (2023): 597,274
  - Density: 484.21/km^{2} (1,254.1/sq mi)
- INSEE code: 832

The arrondissement of Toulon (French: arrondissement de Toulon) is an arrondissement of France in the Var department in the Provence-Alpes-Côte d'Azur region. It has 32 communes. Its population is 590,778 (2021), and its area is 1,233.5 km^{2} (476.3 sq mi).

== Composition ==
The communes of the arrondissement of Toulon, and their INSEE codes, are:

1. Bandol (83009)
2. Le Beausset (83016)
3. Belgentier (83017)
4. Bormes-les-Mimosas (83019)
5. La Cadière-d'Azur (83027)
6. Carqueiranne (83034)
7. Le Castellet (83035)
8. Collobrières (83043)
9. La Crau (83047)
10. Cuers (83049)
11. Évenos (83053)
12. La Farlède (83054)
13. La Garde (83062)
14. Hyères (83069)
15. Le Lavandou (83070)
16. La Londe-les-Maures (83071)
17. Ollioules (83090)
18. Pierrefeu-du-Var (83091)
19. Le Pradet (83098)
20. Le Revest-les-Eaux (83103)
21. Riboux (83105)
22. Saint-Cyr-sur-Mer (83112)
23. Saint-Mandrier-sur-Mer (83153)
24. Sanary-sur-Mer (83123)
25. La Seyne-sur-Mer (83126)
26. Signes (83127)
27. Six-Fours-les-Plages (83129)
28. Solliès-Pont (83130)
29. Solliès-Toucas (83131)
30. Solliès-Ville (83132)
31. Toulon (83137)
32. La Valette-du-Var (83144)

== History ==
The arrondissement of Toulon was created in 1800. At the January 2017 reorganisation of the arrondissements of Var, it lost two communes to the arrondissement of Brignoles.

As a result of the reorganisation of the cantons of France which came into effect in 2015, the borders of the cantons are no longer related to the borders of the arrondissements. The cantons of the arrondissement of Toulon were, as of January 2015:

1. Le Beausset
2. Collobrières
3. La Crau
4. Cuers
5. La Garde
6. Hyères-Est
7. Hyères-Ouest
8. Ollioules
9. Saint-Mandrier-sur-Mer
10. La Seyne-sur-Mer
11. Six-Fours-les-Plages
12. Solliès-Pont
13. Toulon-1
14. Toulon-2
15. Toulon-3
16. Toulon-4
17. Toulon-5
18. Toulon-6
19. Toulon-7
20. Toulon-8
21. Toulon-9
22. La Valette-du-Var
