= Évenos =

- Commune
- Coat of arms
- Location of Évenos
- Location within France Location within Provence-Alpes-Côte d'Azur
- Coordinates: 43°10′15″N 5°49′51″E
- Country: France
- Region: Provence-Alpes-Côte d'Azur
- Department: Var
- Arrondissement: Toulon
- Canton: Ollioules
- Intercommunality: CA Sud Sainte Baume

Government
  - Mayor (2020–2026): Blandine Monier
- Area^{1}: 41.95 km^{2} (16.20 sq mi)
- Elevation: 360 m (1,180 ft)
- Highest elevation: 804 m (2,638 ft)
- Lowest elevation: 78 m (256 ft)
- Population (2023): 2,406
  - Density: 57.35/km^{2} (148.5/sq mi)
- Time zone: UTC+01:00 (CET)
  - Summer (DST): UTC+02:00 (CEST)
- INSEE/Postal code: 83053 /83330
- ^{1} French Land Register data, which excludes lakes, ponds, glaciers > 1 km^{2} (0.386 sq mi or 247 acres) and river estuaries.

Évenos (French pronunciation: [evnɔs]; Occitan: Èbra) is a commune in the Var department in the Provence-Alpes-Côte d'Azur region in southeastern France. It contains Cimaï, a 1 km long limestone cliff that is a popular rock climbing area and was one of the most important sites in the 1980s and 1990s in the development of sport climbing.

== Population ==
Historical population
Year	Pop.	±% p.a.
1968	647	—
1975	700	+1.13%
1982	1,054	+6.02%
1990	1,564	+5.06%
1999	1,905	+2.22%
2007	2,149	+1.52%
2012	2,120	−0.27%
2017	2,405	+2.55%
2023	2,406	+0.01%
Source: INSEE

== See also ==
- Communes of the Var department
