= Ludwig Marcuse =

German philosopher and writer

Ludwig Marcuse (February 8, 1894 in Berlin – August 2, 1971 in Bad Wiessee) was a German philosopher and writer of Jewish origin.

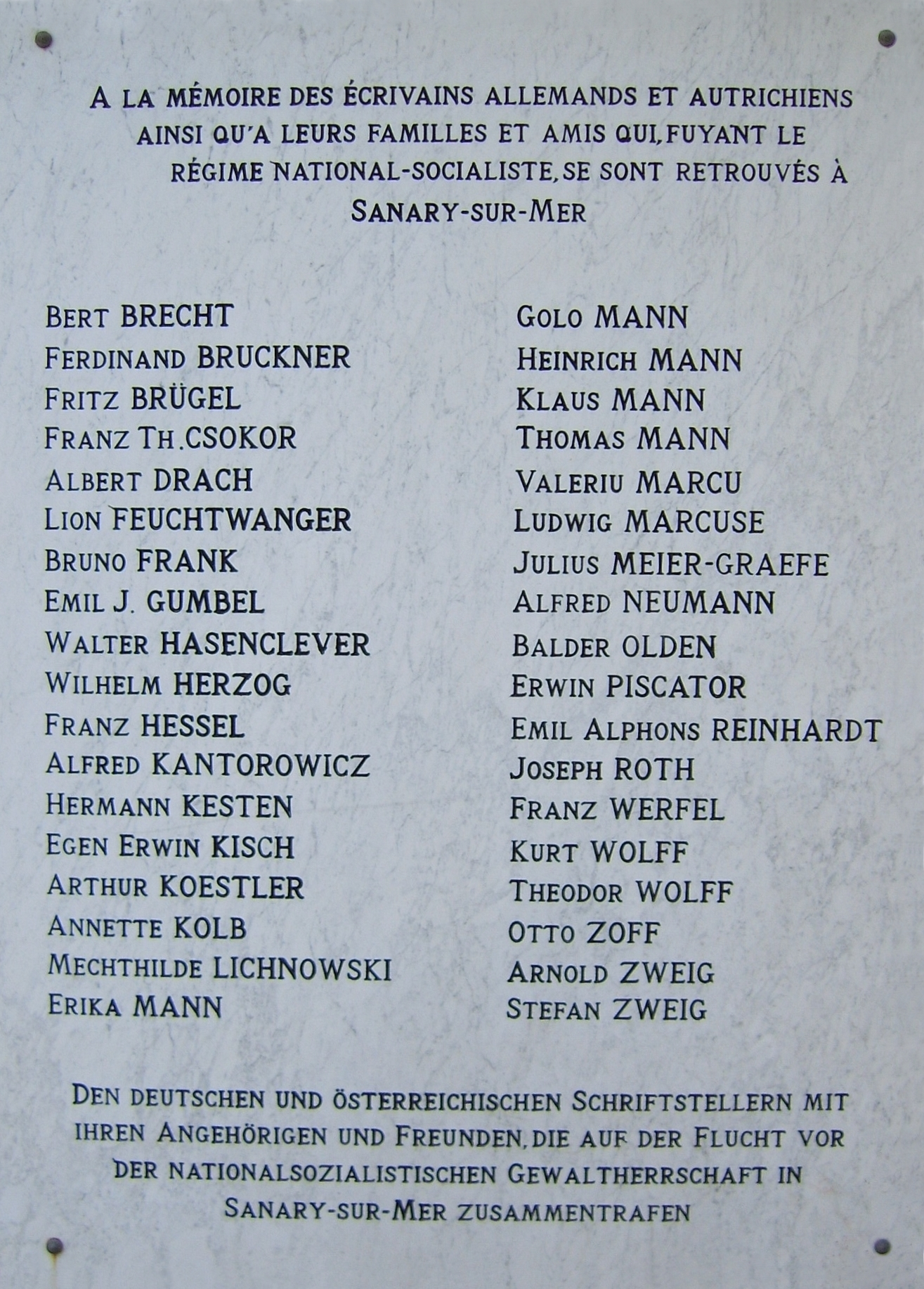
Marcuse's commemorative plaque for German and Austrian refugees at the Sanary-sur-Mer tourist office, originally unveiled on September 18, 1987

From 1933 to 1940 Marcuse lived in France, settling with other German exiles in Sanary-sur-Mer. From 1940 to 1950 he lived in Los Angeles. He returned to Germany at the end of his life.

In 1962, his non-fiction book Obscene: The history of an indignation was published. The work revolves around leading obscenity trials: Friedrich Schlegel's Lucinde (Jena, 1799), Gustave Flaubert's Madame Bovary (Paris, 1857), Arthur Schnitzler's Round Dance (Berlin, 1920), D. H. Lawrence's Lady Chatterley (London, 1960), and Henry Miller's Tropic of Cancer (Los Angeles, 1962). A chapter is also devoted to the crusade of Anthony Comstock and the New York Society for the Suppression of Vice.

Marcuse wrote non-fiction, mostly about the role of German literature in so far as that it was bound up with progressive and emancipatory philosophical, and political causes. These works include subjects like Heine, Börne, Georg Büchner, the development of the tragedy, Sigmund Freud, the philosophy of happiness, and several others.

His papers are held at the University of Southern California.

Ludwig was not related to Herbert Marcuse (another exiled German intellectual of Jewish descent) although he did have a brother by the same name.

== See also ==
- Exilliteratur
