= Riboux =

- Commune
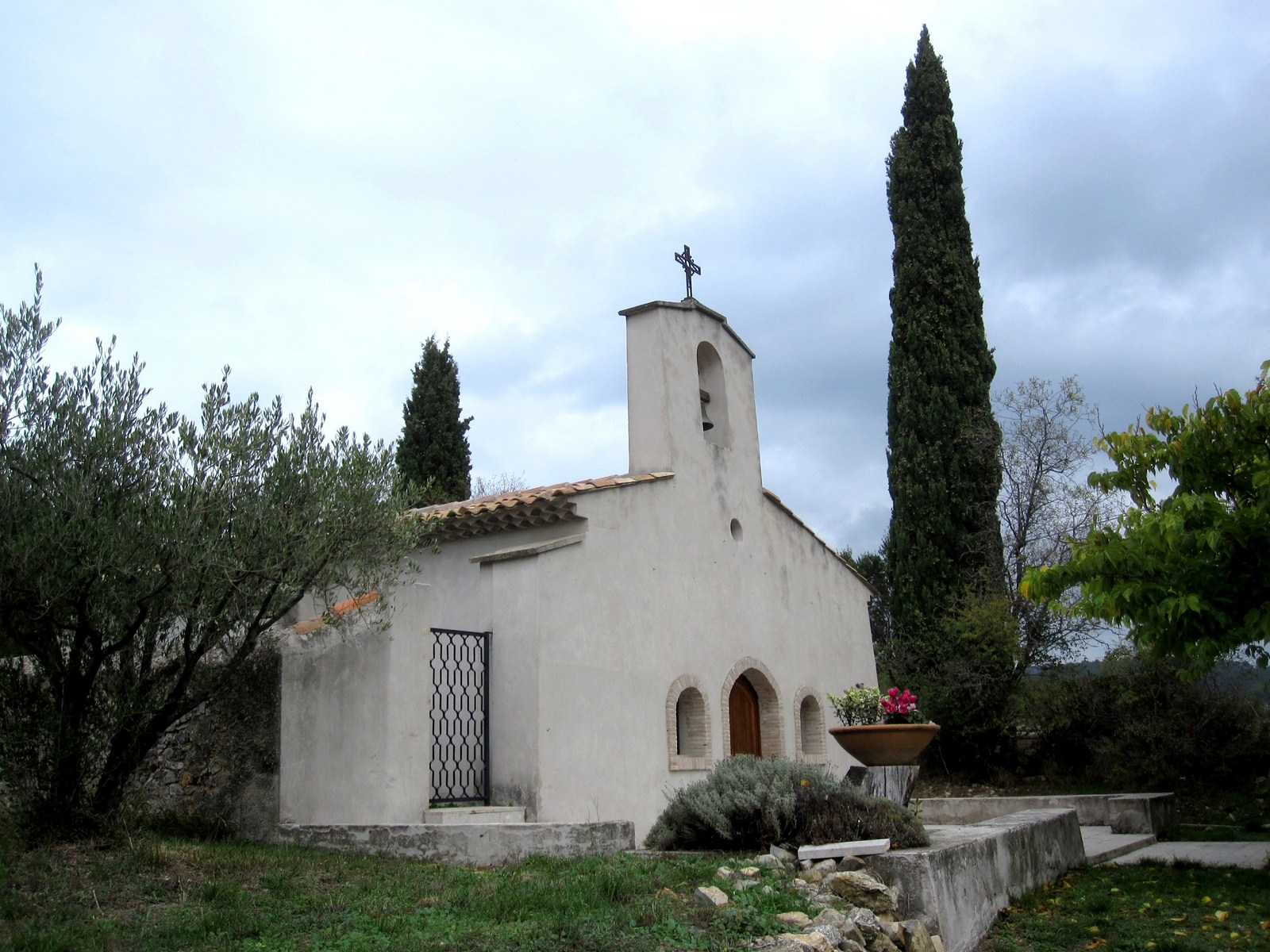
- The chapel of Riboux

- Coat of arms
- Location of Riboux
- Location within France Location within Provence-Alpes-Côte d'Azur
- Coordinates: 43°18′15″N 5°45′25″E
- Country: France
- Region: Provence-Alpes-Côte d'Azur
- Department: Var
- Arrondissement: Toulon
- Canton: Saint-Cyr-sur-Mer
- Intercommunality: CA Sud Sainte Baume

Government
  - Mayor (2020–2026): Suzanne Arnaud
- Area^{1}: 13.48 km^{2} (5.20 sq mi)
- Elevation: 350 m (1,150 ft)
- Highest elevation: 1,054 m (3,458 ft)
- Lowest elevation: 419 m (1,375 ft)
- Population (2023): 51
  - Density: 3.8/km^{2} (9.8/sq mi)
- Time zone: UTC+01:00 (CET)
  - Summer (DST): UTC+02:00 (CEST)
- INSEE/Postal code: 83105 /13780
- ^{1} French Land Register data, which excludes lakes, ponds, glaciers > 1 km^{2} (0.386 sq mi or 247 acres) and river estuaries.

Riboux (French pronunciation: [ʁibu]; Occitan: Ribòus) is a commune in the Var department in the Provence-Alpes-Côte d'Azur region in southeastern France.

== See also ==
- Communes of the Var department
