= Signes, Var =

Signes
- Commune
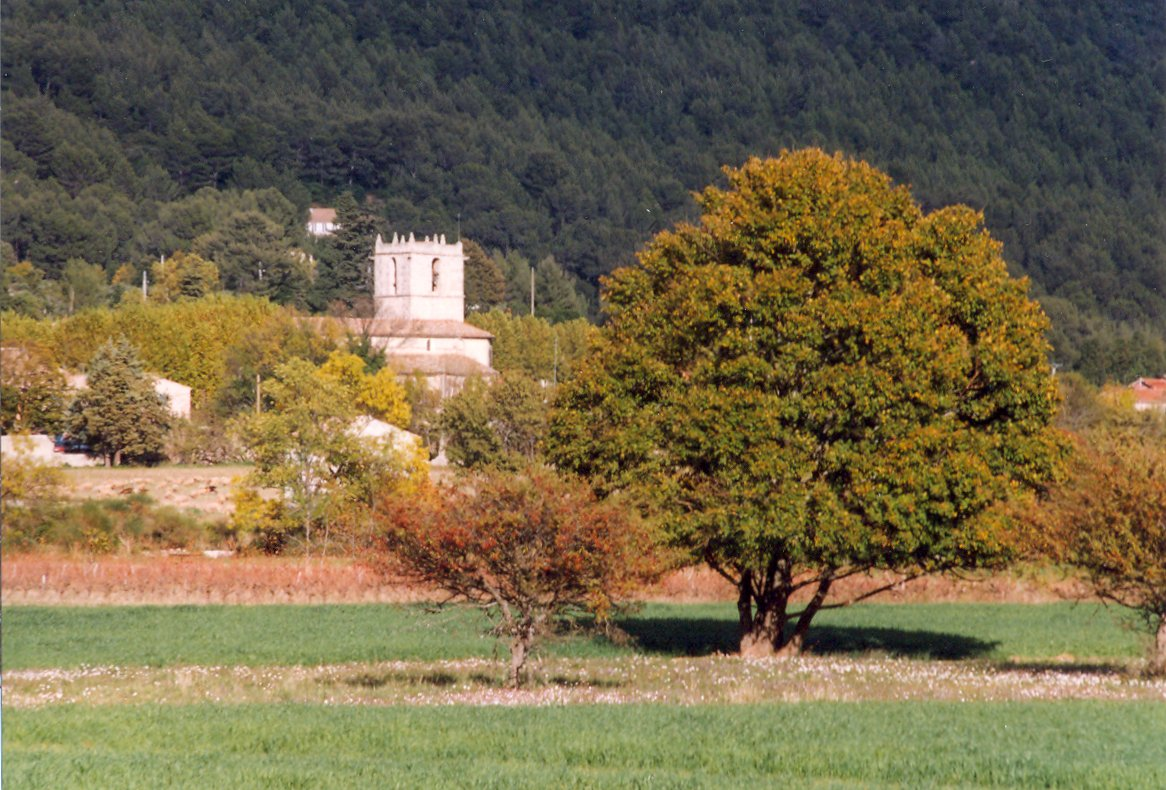
- The church tower of Signes, amongst the trees

- Coat of arms
- Location of Signes
- Location within France Location within Provence-Alpes-Côte d'Azur
- Coordinates: 43°17′32″N 5°51′48″E
- Country: France
- Region: Provence-Alpes-Côte d'Azur
- Department: Var
- Arrondissement: Toulon
- Canton: Saint-Cyr-sur-Mer
- Intercommunality: CA Sud Sainte Baume

Government
  - Mayor (2020–2026): Hélène Verduyn
- Area^{1}: 133.1 km^{2} (51.4 sq mi)
- Elevation: 350 m (1,150 ft)
- Highest elevation: 1,148 m (3,766 ft)
- Lowest elevation: 271 m (889 ft)
- Population (2023): 3,126
  - Density: 23.49/km^{2} (60.83/sq mi)
- Time zone: UTC+01:00 (CET)
  - Summer (DST): UTC+02:00 (CEST)
- INSEE/Postal code: 83127 /83870
- ^{1} French Land Register data, which excludes lakes, ponds, glaciers > 1 km^{2} (0.386 sq mi or 247 acres) and river estuaries.

Signes (French pronunciation: [siɲ]; Occitan: Sinha) is a commune in the Var department in the Provence-Alpes-Côte d'Azur region in southeastern France.

Industrialist Paul Ricard was mayor of Signes from 1972 to 1980. Jean-Mathieu Michel became mayor in 1983, and served until he was run over in August 2019 after confronting a driver whom he accused of illegally dumping rubble.

== Population ==
Historical population
Year	Pop.	±% p.a.
1968	656	—
1975	922	+4.98%
1982	1,078	+2.26%
1990	1,340	+2.76%
1999	2,045	+4.81%
2007	2,771	+3.87%
2012	2,745	−0.19%
2017	2,844	+0.71%
2023	3,126	+1.59%
Source: INSEE

== See also ==
- Communes of the Var department
