= La Cadière-d'Azur =

- Commune
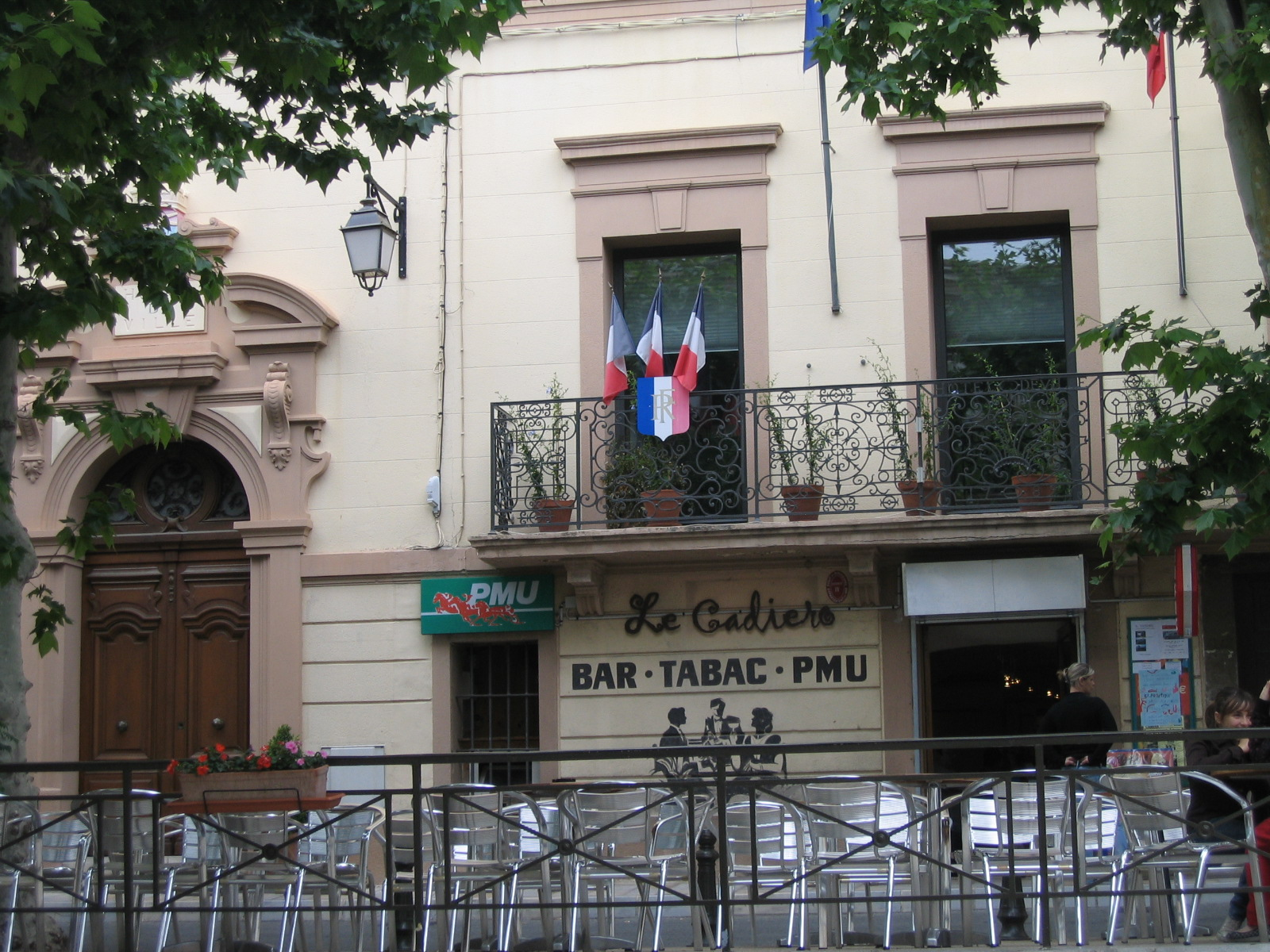
- The town hall of La Cadière-d'Azur

- Flag Coat of arms
- Location of La Cadière-d'Azur
- Location within France Location within Provence-Alpes-Côte d'Azur
- Coordinates: 43°11′48″N 5°45′23″E
- Country: France
- Region: Provence-Alpes-Côte d'Azur
- Department: Var
- Arrondissement: Toulon
- Canton: Saint-Cyr-sur-Mer
- Intercommunality: CA Sud Sainte Baume

Government
  - Mayor (2020–2026): René Jourdan
- Area^{1}: 37.42 km^{2} (14.45 sq mi)
- Elevation: 144 m (472 ft)
- Highest elevation: 460 m (1,510 ft)
- Lowest elevation: 23 m (75 ft)
- Population (2023): 5,739
  - Density: 153.4/km^{2} (397.2/sq mi)
- Time zone: UTC+01:00 (CET)
  - Summer (DST): UTC+02:00 (CEST)
- INSEE/Postal code: 83027 /83740
- Dialling codes: 0494
- ^{1} French Land Register data, which excludes lakes, ponds, glaciers > 1 km^{2} (0.386 sq mi or 247 acres) and river estuaries.

La Cadière-d'Azur (French pronunciation: [la kadjɛʁ dazyʁ]; Occitan: La Cadiera de Provença) is a commune in the Var department in the Provence-Alpes-Côte d'Azur region in southeastern France.

It is situated north-west of Toulon next to Le Castellet and Saint-Cyr-sur-Mer.

== History ==
La Cadière-d'Azur was first recorded in 993. The village was a Seigneurie of the Viscounts of Marseille, and later of the Abbey of St-Victor. There has also been evidence of Roman dwelling in the village with quite a few Gallo-Roman vestiges being discovered in the region, including several Roman fountains.

== Population ==
Historical population
Year	Pop.	±% p.a.
1968	1,589	—
1975	2,044	+3.66%
1982	2,410	+2.38%
1990	3,139	+3.36%
1999	4,239	+3.39%
2007	5,151	+2.47%
2012	5,448	+1.13%
2017	5,550	+0.37%
2023	5,739	+0.56%
Source: INSEE

== The village ==
The village is on a hilltop that overlooks a lot of the Bandol vineyards.

The back of St-Andre Church built onto the cliff face

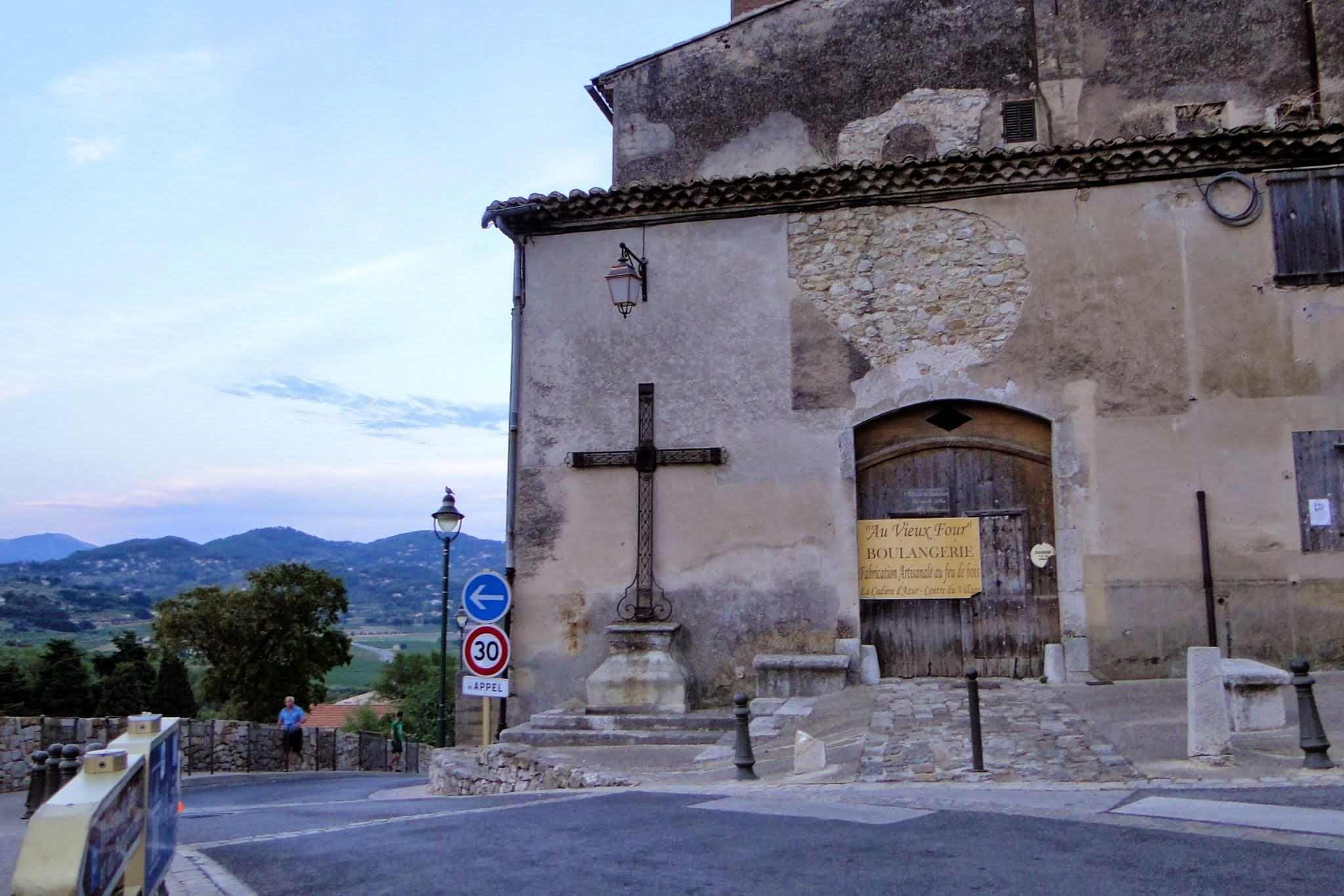
Old bakery

The village still has 3 remaining medieval Gate Doors, which are the Porte St-Jean (built-in January 1561), Porte de la Colle, and the Porte Mazarine, in the ancient medieval walls. Two other older medieval buildings of the village are the Tour de l'Horloge with a 16th-century campanile and the 16th-century St-André church which features a tall hexagonal clock tower.

The village has a museum of the local area, a post office, a cemetery, and several shops and cafes.

== Wine ==
La Cadière-d'Azur is surrounded by vineyards and is part of the Côtes de Provence Appellation d'Origine Contrôlée (AOC) of Bandol.

== See also ==
- Communes of the Var department
