= Plan-d'Aups-Sainte-Baume =

- Commune
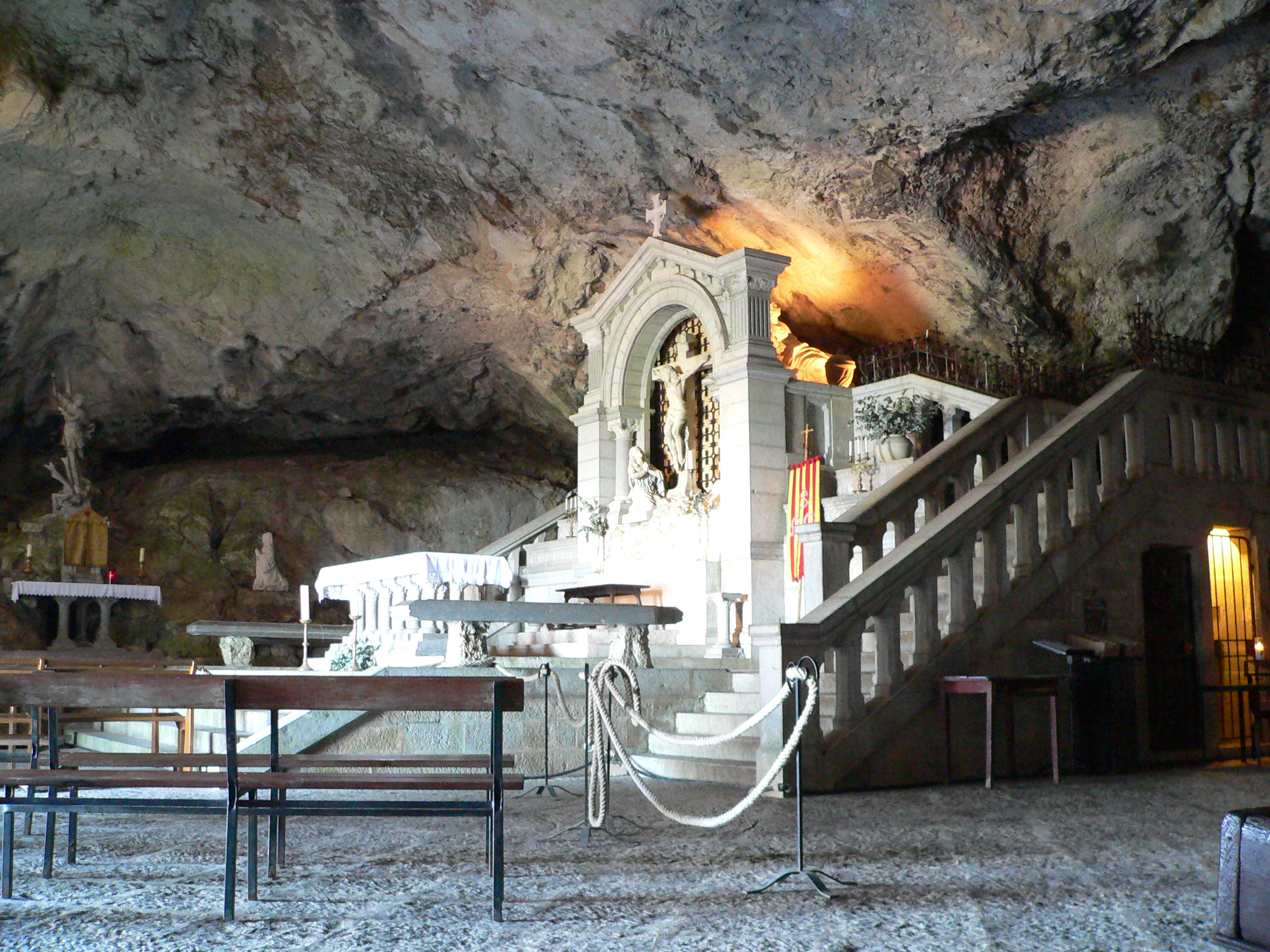
- The cave of Sainte-Baume

- Coat of arms
- Location of Plan-d'Aups-Sainte-Baume
- Location within France Location within Provence-Alpes-Côte d'Azur
- Coordinates: 43°19′46″N 5°43′01″E
- Country: France
- Region: Provence-Alpes-Côte d'Azur
- Department: Var
- Arrondissement: Brignoles
- Canton: Saint-Cyr-sur-Mer
- Intercommunality: CA Provence Verte

Government
  - Mayor (2020–2026): Carine Paillard
- Area^{1}: 24.91 km^{2} (9.62 sq mi)
- Elevation: 700 m (2,300 ft)
- Highest elevation: 1,148 m (3,766 ft)
- Lowest elevation: 510 m (1,670 ft)
- Population (2023): 2,527
  - Density: 101.4/km^{2} (262.7/sq mi)
- Time zone: UTC+01:00 (CET)
  - Summer (DST): UTC+02:00 (CEST)
- INSEE/Postal code: 83093 /83640
- ^{1} French Land Register data, which excludes lakes, ponds, glaciers > 1 km^{2} (0.386 sq mi or 247 acres) and river estuaries.

Plan-d'Aups-Sainte-Baume (French pronunciation: [plɑ̃ dops sɛ̃t bom]; Provençal: Lo Plan d’Aups de la Santa Bauma, before 1993: Plan-d'Aups) is a commune in the Var department in the Provence-Alpes-Côte d'Azur region in southeastern France. It lies to the north of the Sainte-Baume mountain range.

== History ==
=== Second World War ===
In June 1944, at the aftermath of D-Day when the French Resistance went on an offensive against the German occupiers, the hills near Plan-d'Aups were the site of a bloody battle. Some 200 Maquis had set up a camp there, commanded by SOE agent Robert Burdett. They were attacked by large German forces. Though taken by surprise due to a faulty placing of guards, the Maquis did inflict considerable casualties on the Germans and many of them managed to escape into the surrounding mountains.

== Geography ==
=== Climate ===
Plan-d'Aups-Sainte-Baume has a hot-summer Mediterranean climate (Köppen climate classification Csa). The average annual temperature in Plan-d'Aups-Sainte-Baume is 14.0 °C (57.2 °F). The average annual rainfall is 1,001.8 mm (39.44 in) with November as the wettest month. The temperatures are highest on average in August, at around 23.5 °C (74.3 °F), and lowest in January, at around 6.0 °C (42.8 °F). The highest temperature ever recorded in Plan-d'Aups-Sainte-Baume was 41.6 °C (106.9 °F) on 28 June 2019; the coldest temperature ever recorded was −8.9 °C (16.0 °F) on 4 February 2012.

Climate data for Plan-d'Aups-Sainte-Baume (1991−2020 normals, extremes 2007−present)
Month	Jan	Feb	Mar	Apr	May	Jun	Jul	Aug	Sep	Oct	Nov	Dec	Year
Record high °C (°F)	20.7 (69.3)	21.1 (70.0)	23.4 (74.1)	27.2 (81.0)	31.5 (88.7)	41.6 (106.9)	38.1 (100.6)	39.0 (102.2)	33.0 (91.4)	29.0 (84.2)	20.7 (69.3)	18.6 (65.5)	41.6 (106.9)
Mean daily maximum °C (°F)	9.1 (48.4)	10.3 (50.5)	13.6 (56.5)	17.1 (62.8)	20.9 (69.6)	25.9 (78.6)	29.1 (84.4)	29.3 (84.7)	24.3 (75.7)	19.0 (66.2)	13.2 (55.8)	9.7 (49.5)	18.5 (65.3)
Daily mean °C (°F)	6.0 (42.8)	6.5 (43.7)	9.3 (48.7)	12.5 (54.5)	15.9 (60.6)	20.4 (68.7)	23.3 (73.9)	23.5 (74.3)	19.2 (66.6)	14.8 (58.6)	10.0 (50.0)	6.8 (44.2)	14.0 (57.2)
Mean daily minimum °C (°F)	2.9 (37.2)	2.7 (36.9)	5.0 (41.0)	7.9 (46.2)	10.8 (51.4)	14.9 (58.8)	17.5 (63.5)	17.8 (64.0)	14.1 (57.4)	10.6 (51.1)	6.7 (44.1)	3.8 (38.8)	9.6 (49.3)
Record low °C (°F)	−6.8 (19.8)	−8.9 (16.0)	−4.4 (24.1)	−3.0 (26.6)	1.7 (35.1)	6.5 (43.7)	10.2 (50.4)	10.1 (50.2)	2.9 (37.2)	−2.2 (28.0)	−5.0 (23.0)	−8.2 (17.2)	−8.9 (16.0)
Average precipitation mm (inches)	93.3 (3.67)	82.3 (3.24)	82.7 (3.26)	93.2 (3.67)	79.4 (3.13)	52.0 (2.05)	21.7 (0.85)	28.4 (1.12)	56.0 (2.20)	122.2 (4.81)	168.0 (6.61)	122.6 (4.83)	1,001.8 (39.44)
Average precipitation days (≥ 1.0 mm)	7.2	6.8	6.3	7.0	6.8	3.7	1.9	2.1	4.4	6.5	8.9	7.1	68.6
Source: Météo-France

== Population ==
Historical population
Year	Pop.	±% p.a.
1968	185	—
1975	207	+1.62%
1982	249	+2.67%
1990	361	+4.75%
1999	764	+8.69%
2007	1,176	+5.54%
2012	1,859	+9.59%
2017	2,158	+3.03%
2023	2,527	+2.67%
Source: INSEE

== See also ==
- Communes of the Var department
