= Le Beausset =

- Commune
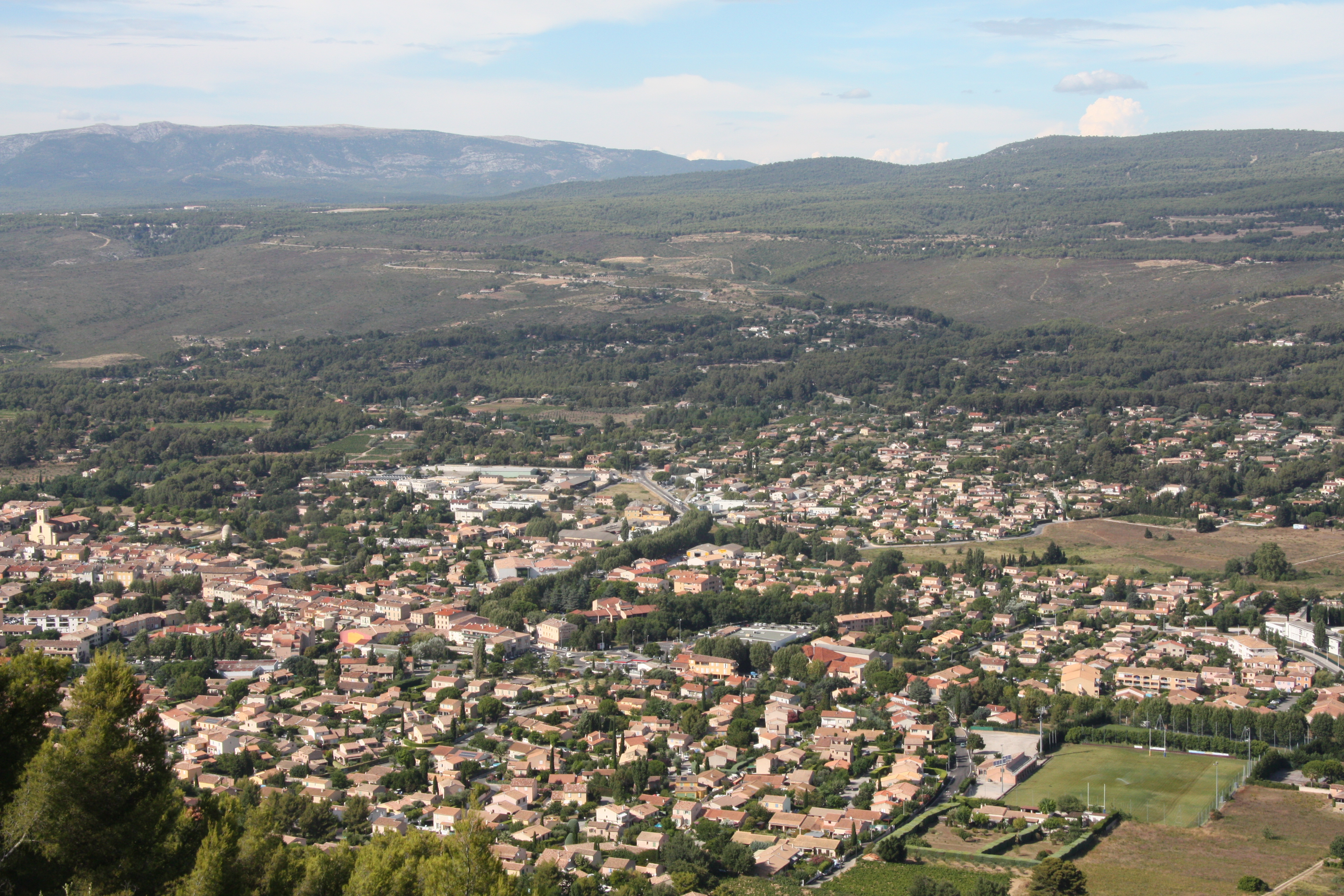
- A general view of Le Beausset

- Coat of arms
- Location of Le Beausset
- Location within France Location within Provence-Alpes-Côte d'Azur
- Coordinates: 43°11′56″N 5°48′12″E
- Country: France
- Region: Provence-Alpes-Côte d'Azur
- Department: Var
- Arrondissement: Toulon
- Canton: Saint-Cyr-sur-Mer
- Intercommunality: CA Sud Sainte Baume

Government
  - Mayor (2026–32): Claude Alimi
- Area^{1}: 36 km^{2} (14 sq mi)
- Highest elevation: 560 m (1,840 ft)
- Lowest elevation: 80 m (260 ft)
- Population (2023): 10,219
  - Density: 280/km^{2} (740/sq mi)
- Time zone: UTC+01:00 (CET)
  - Summer (DST): UTC+02:00 (CEST)
- INSEE/Postal code: 83016 /83330
- ^{1} French Land Register data, which excludes lakes, ponds, glaciers > 1 km^{2} (0.386 sq mi or 247 acres) and river estuaries.

Le Beausset (French pronunciation: [lə bosɛ]; Occitan: Lo Baucet) is a commune in the Var department in the Provence-Alpes-Côte d'Azur region in southeastern France.

== Population ==
Historical population
Year	Pop.	±% p.a.
1968	2,722	—
1975	2,992	+1.36%
1982	5,327	+8.59%
1990	7,114	+3.68%
1999	7,723	+0.92%
2007	8,841	+1.70%
2012	9,204	+0.81%
2017	9,736	+1.13%
2023	10,219	+0.81%
Source: INSEE

== See also ==
- Communes of the Var department
