= Ollioules =

French commune in Var, southeastern France

- Commune
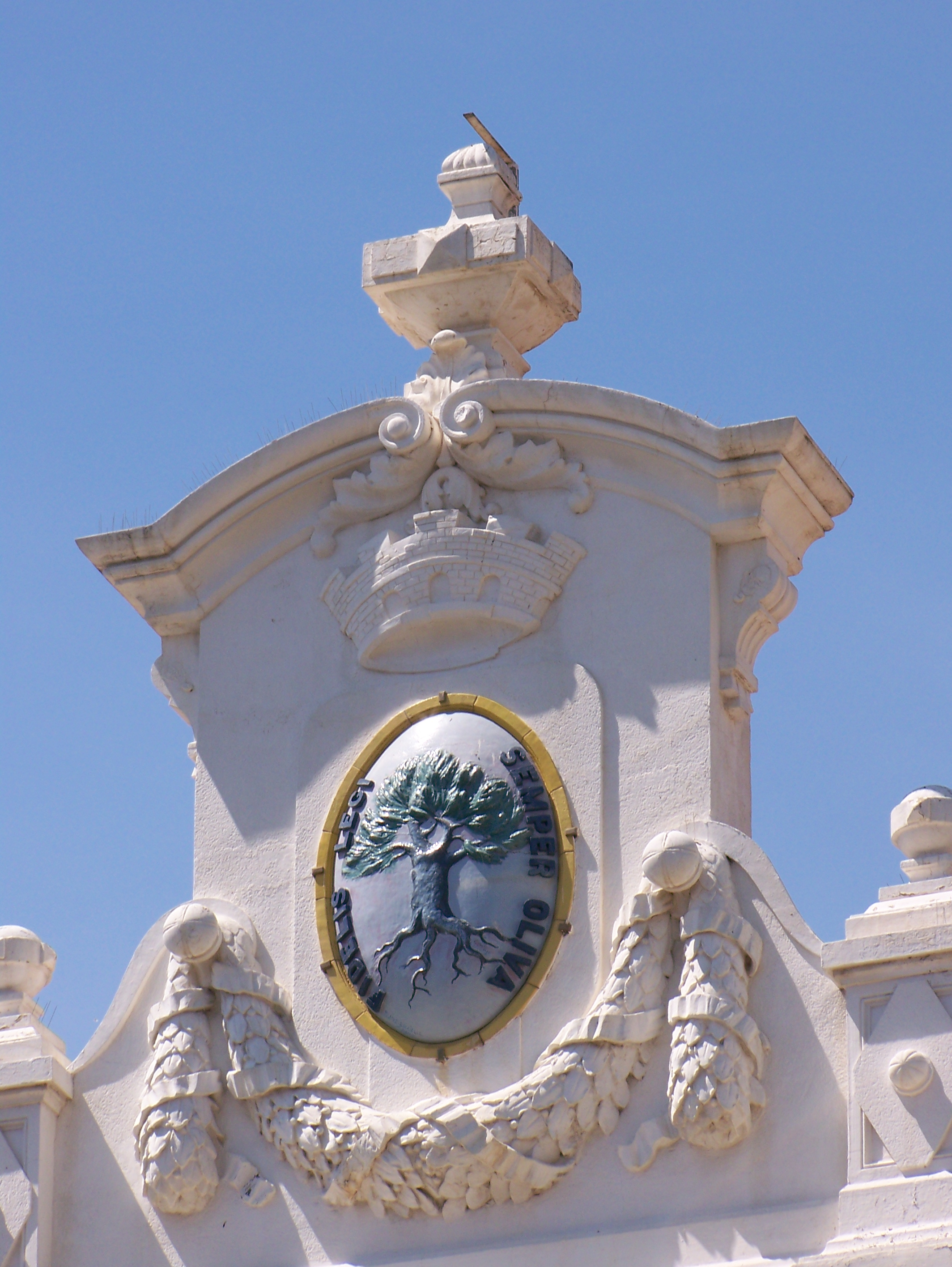
- Detail on the front of the town hall

- Coat of arms
- Location of Ollioules
- Location within France Location within Provence-Alpes-Côte d'Azur
- Coordinates: 43°07′59″N 5°51′00″E
- Country: France
- Region: Provence-Alpes-Côte d'Azur
- Department: Var
- Arrondissement: Toulon
- Canton: Ollioules
- Intercommunality: Métropole Toulon Provence Méditerranée

Government
  - Mayor (2020–2026): Robert Beneventi
- Area^{1}: 19.89 km^{2} (7.68 sq mi)
- Elevation: 50 m (160 ft)
- Highest elevation: 520 m (1,710 ft)
- Lowest elevation: 0 m (0 ft)
- Population (2023): 14,568
  - Density: 732.4/km^{2} (1,897/sq mi)
- Time zone: UTC+01:00 (CET)
  - Summer (DST): UTC+02:00 (CEST)
- INSEE/Postal code: 83090 /83190
- Website: www.ollioules.fr
- ^{1} French Land Register data, which excludes lakes, ponds, glaciers > 1 km^{2} (0.386 sq mi or 247 acres) and river estuaries.

Ollioules (French pronunciation: [ɔljul]; Occitan: Oliulas) is a commune in the Var department in the Provence-Alpes-Côte d'Azur region in southeastern France. It is a western suburb of Toulon.

== Population ==
Historical population
Year	Pop.	±% p.a.
1968	7,803	—
1975	8,786	+1.71%
1982	9,242	+0.73%
1990	10,398	+1.48%
1999	12,198	+1.79%
2007	13,245	+1.03%
2012	13,267	+0.03%
2017	13,702	+0.65%
2023	14,568	+1.03%
Source: INSEE

== Notable people ==
- Christophe Castaner (born 1966), lawyer and politician
- Charles Coste, 1948 Olympic gold medal cyclist, and the 100 year old bearer of the 2024 Summer Olympics torch during the opening ceremony of the games in Paris.
- Josuha Guilavogui (born 1990), footballer
- Adrien Frasse-Sombet (born 1983), classical cellist

== Twin towns ==
Ollioules is twinned with:

- Weiler-Simmerberg, Germany, since 2004-2005
- Alto Reno Terme, Italy since 1987

== See also ==
- Communes of the Var department
