= Bandol =

- Commune
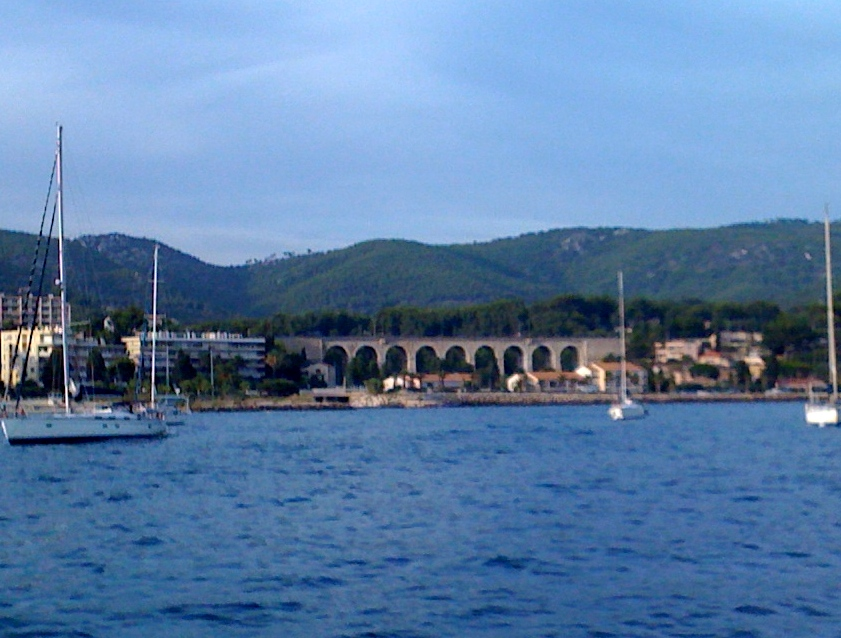
- Viaduct in Bandol

- Coat of arms
- Location of Bandol
- Location within France Location within Provence-Alpes-Côte d'Azur
- Coordinates: 43°08′14″N 5°43′54″E
- Country: France
- Region: Provence-Alpes-Côte d'Azur
- Department: Var
- Arrondissement: Toulon
- Canton: Ollioules
- Intercommunality: CA Sud Sainte Baume

Government
  - Mayor (2020–2026): Jean-Paul Joseph
- Area^{1}: 8.58 km^{2} (3.31 sq mi)
- Highest elevation: 221 m (725 ft)
- Lowest elevation: 0 m (0 ft)
- Population (2023): 8,267
  - Density: 964/km^{2} (2,500/sq mi)
- Time zone: UTC+01:00 (CET)
  - Summer (DST): UTC+02:00 (CEST)
- INSEE/Postal code: 83009 /83150
- ^{1} French Land Register data, which excludes lakes, ponds, glaciers > 1 km^{2} (0.386 sq mi or 247 acres) and river estuaries.

Bandol (French pronunciation: [bɑ̃dɔl]; Occitan: Bandòu) is a commune in Var department, Provence-Alpes-Côte d'Azur region, southeastern France. Bandol and the seat of its eponymous commune, was founded in 1595 and built around a small military fort.

== Bandol wine ==
The Bandol wine region, located near the coast east of Marseille and Cassis, is one of Provence's most internationally recognized wine regions. It was recognised as an AOC in 1941. Built around the village of Bandol, west of Toulon, the Bandol AOC covers the production of 8 communes with silica and limestone soils. Those soils and the warm, coastal climate are ideally suited for the late ripening Mourvèdre grape which is the major variety of the region. For the red, Mourvèdre must account for at least 50% of the blend. For the rosés, Mourvèdre must account for at least 20% of the blend, though most producers will use significantly more, with Grenache and Cinsaut usually filling out the rest of the wine's composition.

== Population ==
Historical population
Year	Pop.	±% p.a.
1968	5,088	—
1975	6,184	+2.83%
1982	6,706	+1.16%
1990	7,431	+1.29%
1999	7,905	+0.69%
2007	8,747	+1.27%
2012	7,622	−2.72%
2017	8,409	+1.98%
2023	8,267	−0.28%
Source: INSEE

== Notable people ==
- Alain Bombard, scientist
- Alexander Lévy (born 1990), professional golfer
- Louis Lumière, cinematographer
- Paul Ricard, businessman
- Jacques Torres, pastry chef
- Jonny Wilkinson, rugby player

== International relations ==
Bandol is twinned with:

- Nettuno, Italy
- Onex, Switzerland
- Wehr, Germany

== See also ==
- Communes of the Var department
- Bandol (wine)
- Island of Bendor
