= Saint-Zacharie =

Saint-Zacharie Sant Jacariá (Occitan)
- Commune
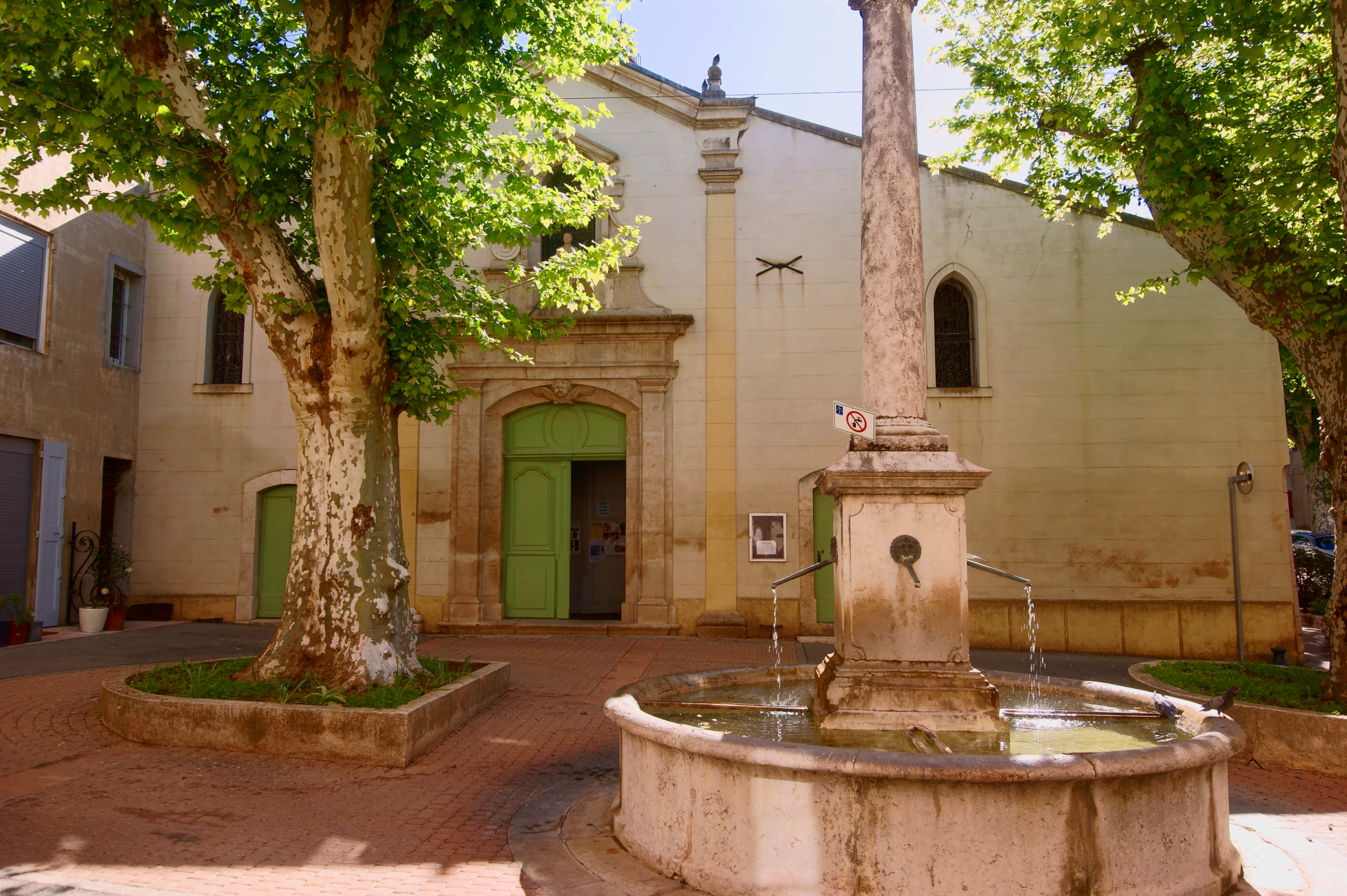
- The church of Saint-Zacharie

- Coat of arms
- Location of Saint-Zacharie
- Location within France Location within Provence-Alpes-Côte d'Azur
- Coordinates: 43°23′03″N 5°42′24″E
- Country: France
- Region: Provence-Alpes-Côte d'Azur
- Department: Var
- Arrondissement: Brignoles
- Canton: Saint-Cyr-sur-Mer
- Intercommunality: Aix-Marseille-Provence

Government
  - Mayor (2020–2026): Jean-Jacques Coulomb
- Area^{1}: 27.02 km^{2} (10.43 sq mi)
- Elevation: 362 m (1,188 ft)
- Highest elevation: 756 m (2,480 ft)
- Lowest elevation: 239 m (784 ft)
- Population (2023): 5,879
  - Density: 217.6/km^{2} (563.5/sq mi)
- Demonym: Zachariens
- Time zone: UTC+01:00 (CET)
  - Summer (DST): UTC+02:00 (CEST)
- INSEE/Postal code: 83120 /83640
- Website: saint-zacharie.fr
- ^{1} French Land Register data, which excludes lakes, ponds, glaciers > 1 km^{2} (0.386 sq mi or 247 acres) and river estuaries.

Saint-Zacharie (French pronunciation: [sɛ̃ zakaʁi]; Provençal Occitan: Sant Jacariá) is a commune in the Var department in the Provence-Alpes-Côte d'Azur region in Southeastern France. It is located within the Aix-Marseille-Provence Metropolis, on the departmental border with Bouches-du-Rhône, northeast of Aubagne.

== Population ==
Historical population
Year	Pop.	±% p.a.
1968	1,499	—
1975	1,532	+0.31%
1982	2,206	+5.35%
1990	3,224	+4.86%
1999	4,184	+2.94%
2007	4,802	+1.74%
2012	5,013	+0.86%
2017	5,604	+2.25%
2023	5,879	+0.80%
Source: INSEE

== Points of interest ==
- Parc du Moulin Blanc
- Eglise saint-jean baptiste
- Château de Montvert
- The river Huveaune

== Notable residents ==
- Joseph Paul Gaimard (1793–1858), naval surgeon and naturalist, was born in Saint-Zacharie.
- Jean-Claude Gaudin, Mayor of Marseille.

== See also ==
- Communes of the Var department
