= Canton of Ollioules =

Coordinates: 43.14°N 5.85°E

The canton of Ollioules is an administrative division of the Var department, southeastern France. Its borders were not modified at the French canton reorganisation which came into effect in March 2015. Its seat is in Ollioules.

It consists of the following communes:

1. Bandol
2. Évenos
3. Ollioules
4. Sanary-sur-Mer
