= Sainte-Baume =

Mountain range in France

Coordinates: 43°19′N 5°45′E

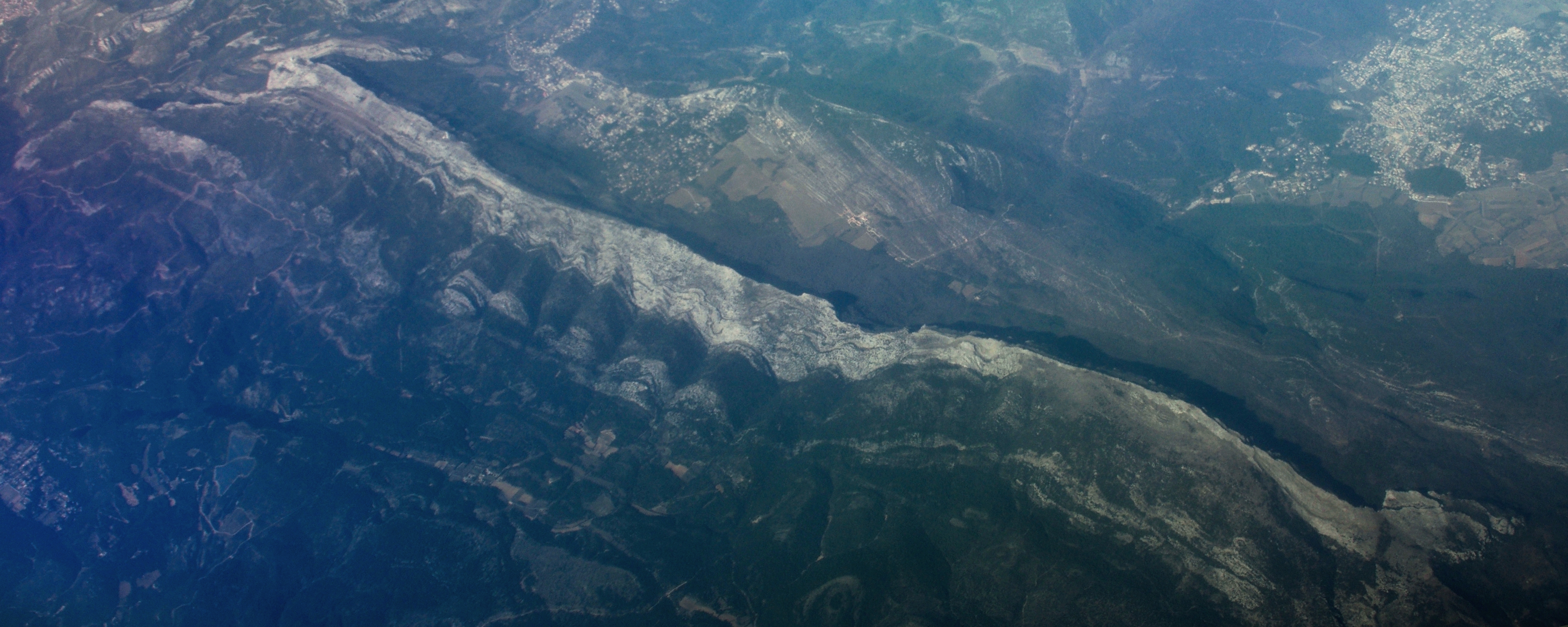
Aerial view of the Sainte-Baume

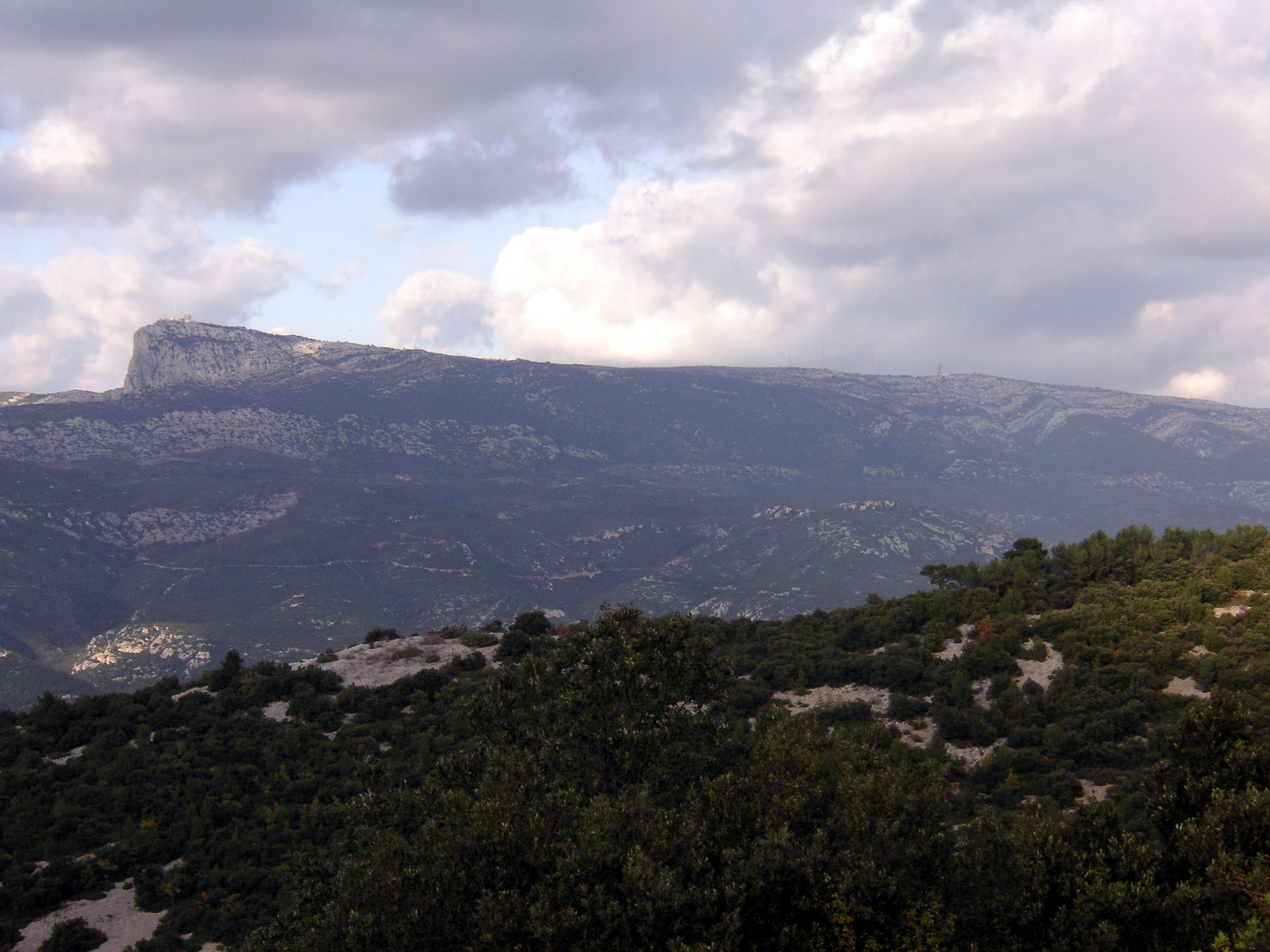
Massif de la Sainte-Baume

The Sainte-Baume (Provençal: Massís de la Santa Bauma according to classical orthography and La Santo Baumo according to mistralian orthography) is a mountain ridge spreading between the departments of Bouches-du-Rhône and Var in Southern France. Its summit is 1147 metres high.

== History ==
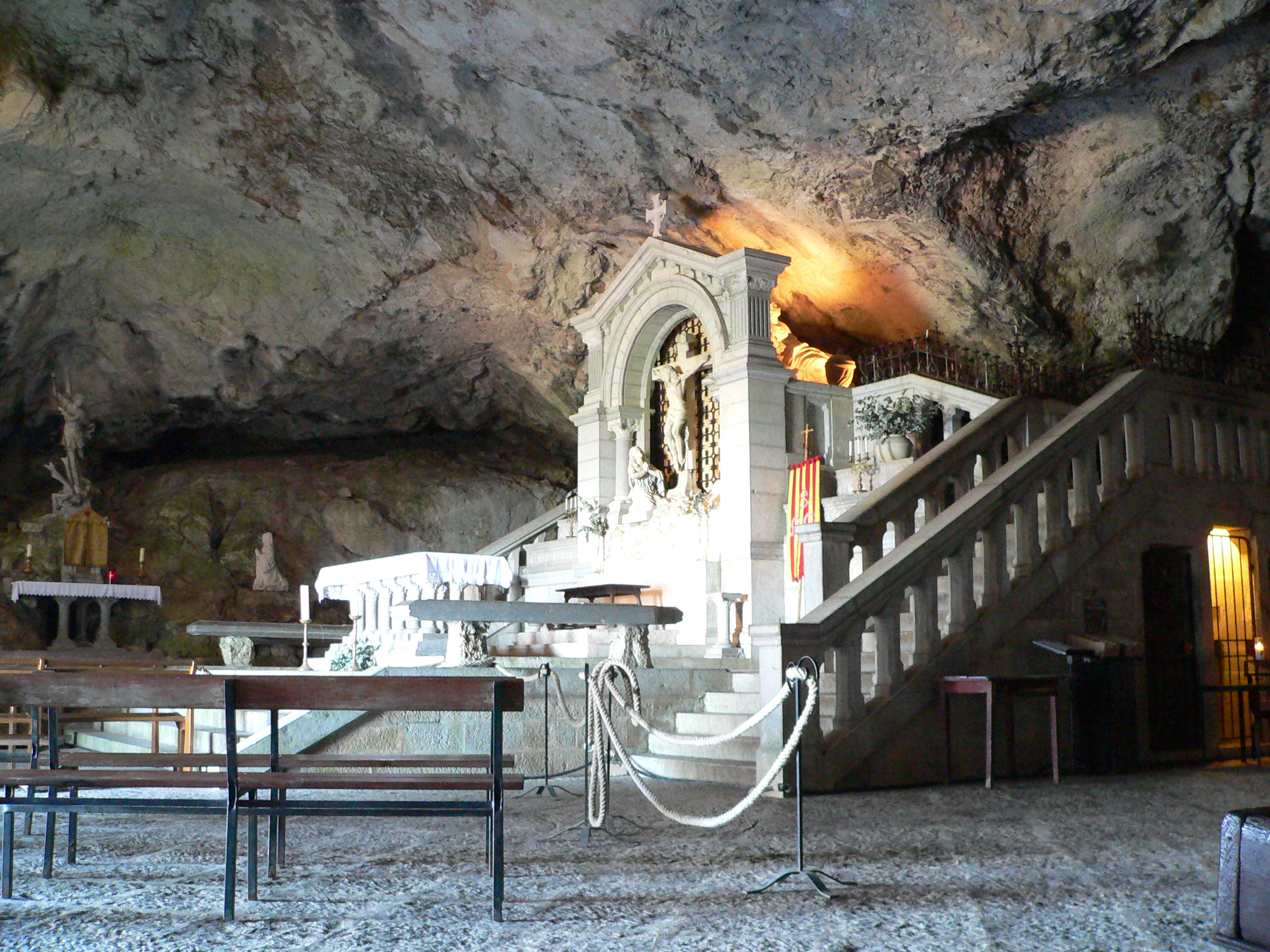
Sainte Baume grotto

John Cassian established a priory at Sainte-Baume in the early fifth century.

=== Magdalene's grotto ===
According to the Tradition of Provence, Mary Magdalene, Lazarus of Bethany and Maximinus, one of the Seventy Disciples, and some companions, expelled by persecutions from the Holy Land, traversed the Mediterranean in a frail boat with neither rudder nor mast and landed at the place called Saintes-Maries-de-la-Mer near Arles. Lazarus came to Marseille and converted the whole of Provence. Magdalene is said to have retired to a cave on a hill by Marseille, La Sainte-Baume ("Holy Cave", baumo in Provençal), where she gave herself up to a life of prayer and contemplation. The cave is now a Christian pilgrimage site.

Louis IX of France visited the grotto in 1254. The site was under the management of the Dominicans when it was pillaged during the French Revolution. They subsequently returned in 1859 at the behest of Jean-Baptiste Henri Lacordaire.

In 1941, a hostel and school were established to serve as refuge for those fleeing Nazi persecution.

== See also ==
- Saint-Maximin-la-Sainte-Baume
