= Valbelle (disambiguation) =

Valbelle is a commune in the Alpes-de-Haute-Provence department in southeastern France. The word may also refer to:

- Dominique Valbelle (born 1947), French egyptologist
- Jean-Baptiste de Valbelle (1627–1681), French naval officer
- Joseph-Alphonse-Omer de Valbelle (1729–1818), French aristocrat and military officer
- Joseph-Anne de Valbelle de Tourves (1648–1722), French aristocrat, landowner and public official
- Louis-Alphonse de Valbelle (1640–1708), French Roman Catholic Bishop
