= Joseph-Anne de Valbelle de Tourves =

- Born: 1648; Tourves, Province of Provence, France
- Died: 1722 (aged 73–74); Aix-en-Provence, Province of Provence, France
- Occupations: Landowner; Public official
- Spouse: Gabrielle de Brancas de Forcalquier
- Children: Cosme-Maximilien-Louis-Joseph de Valbelle de Tourves
- Parent(s): Jean-Baptiste de Valbelle de Tourves; Anne de Vintimille d'Ollioules
- Relatives: Joseph-Alphonse-Omer de Valbelle (great-grandson)

Joseph-Anne de Valbelle de Tourves (1648–1722) was a French aristocrat, landowner and public official.

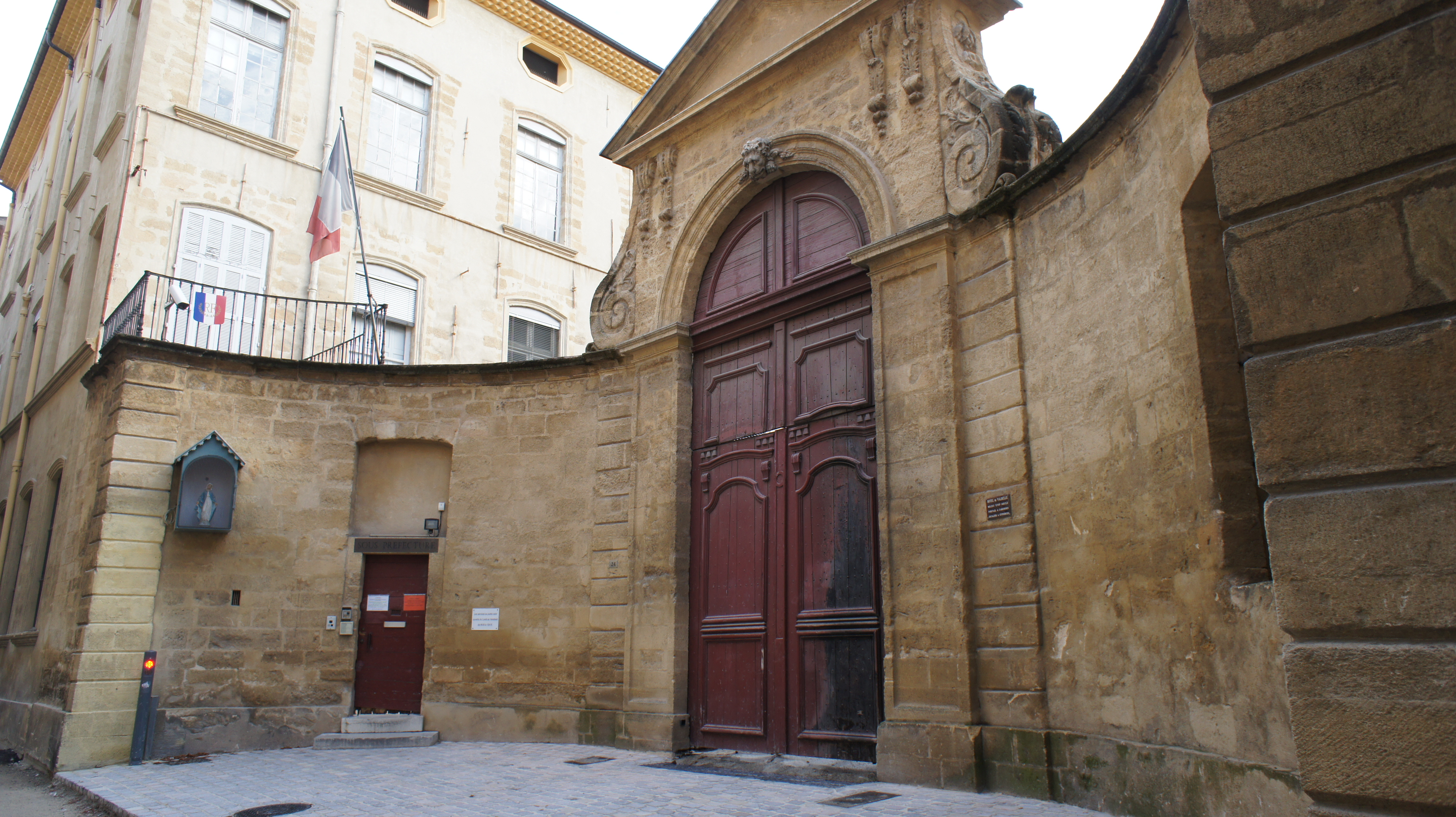
Hôtel de Valbelle in Aix-en-Provence

== Early life ==
Joseph-Anne de Valbelle de Tourves was born in 1648 in Tourves. His father, Jean-Baptiste de Valbelle de Tourves (1610-1695), was an Advisor to the Parlement of Aix-en-Provence. His mother was Anne de Vintimille d'Ollioules, daughter of Madelon de Vintimille d'Ollouilles and Louise de Coriolis. One of his maternal grandfathers, Laurent de Coriolis de Corbières (1576-1640), served as President a mortier of the Parlement of Aix-en-Provence in 1600.

In 1655, when he was only seven years old, the Hôtel de Valbelle, a listed hôtel particulier located at 22 Rue Mignet in Aix-en-Provence, was built for him.

== Career ==
He served as Président à mortier of the Parlement of Aix-en-Provence in 1686.

In 1695, he inherited the marquisate of Tourves from his late father. Additionally, he inherited the county of Sainte-Tulle and the baronetcy of La Tour, as well as the lordship of Saint-Symphorien, Bevons, Seissons, Guillet and Rougiers.

== Personal life ==
In 1674, he married Gabrielle de Brancas de Forcalquier, daughter of Honoré de Brancas de Forcalquier and Françoise de Cambis. They had three sons:

- Cosme-Maximilien-Louis-Joseph de Valbelle de Tourves (1685-1735).
- Alphonse-Joseph de Valbelle de Tourves.
- Claude-Léon de Valbelle de Tourves.

== Death ==
He died on 15 July 1722 in Aix-en-Provence.
