= Tapenade =

Provençal French dish

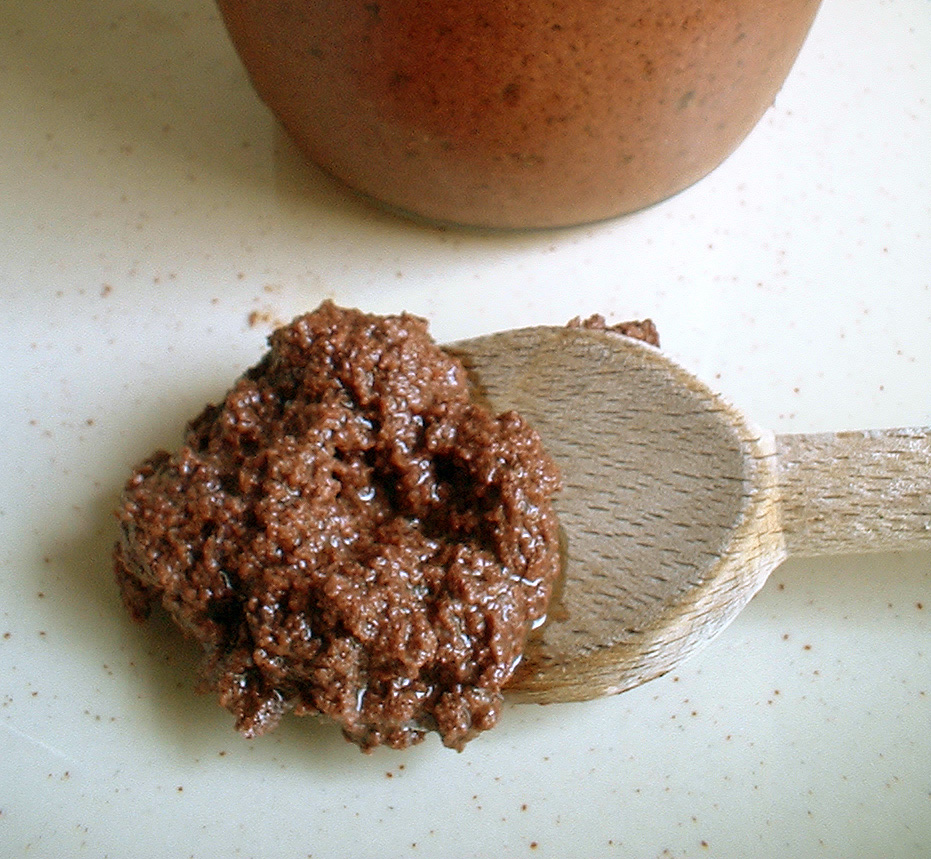
- Type: Spread
- Course: Hors d'œuvre
- Place of origin: France
- Region or state: Provence
- Main ingredients: Olives, capers, anchovies

Tapenade (French pronunciation: [tapəˈnad]; Occitan: tapenada [tapeˈnadɔ]) is a Provençal dish of puréed or finely chopped olives, capers, and sometimes anchovies used as a spread, condiment and culinary ingredient. The name comes from the Provençal word for capers, tapenas (pronounced [taˈpenɔs]). It is a popular food in the south of France, where it is generally eaten as an hors d'œuvre spread on bread, with fish, in salads, and sometimes used to stuff poultry for the main course.

== History ==
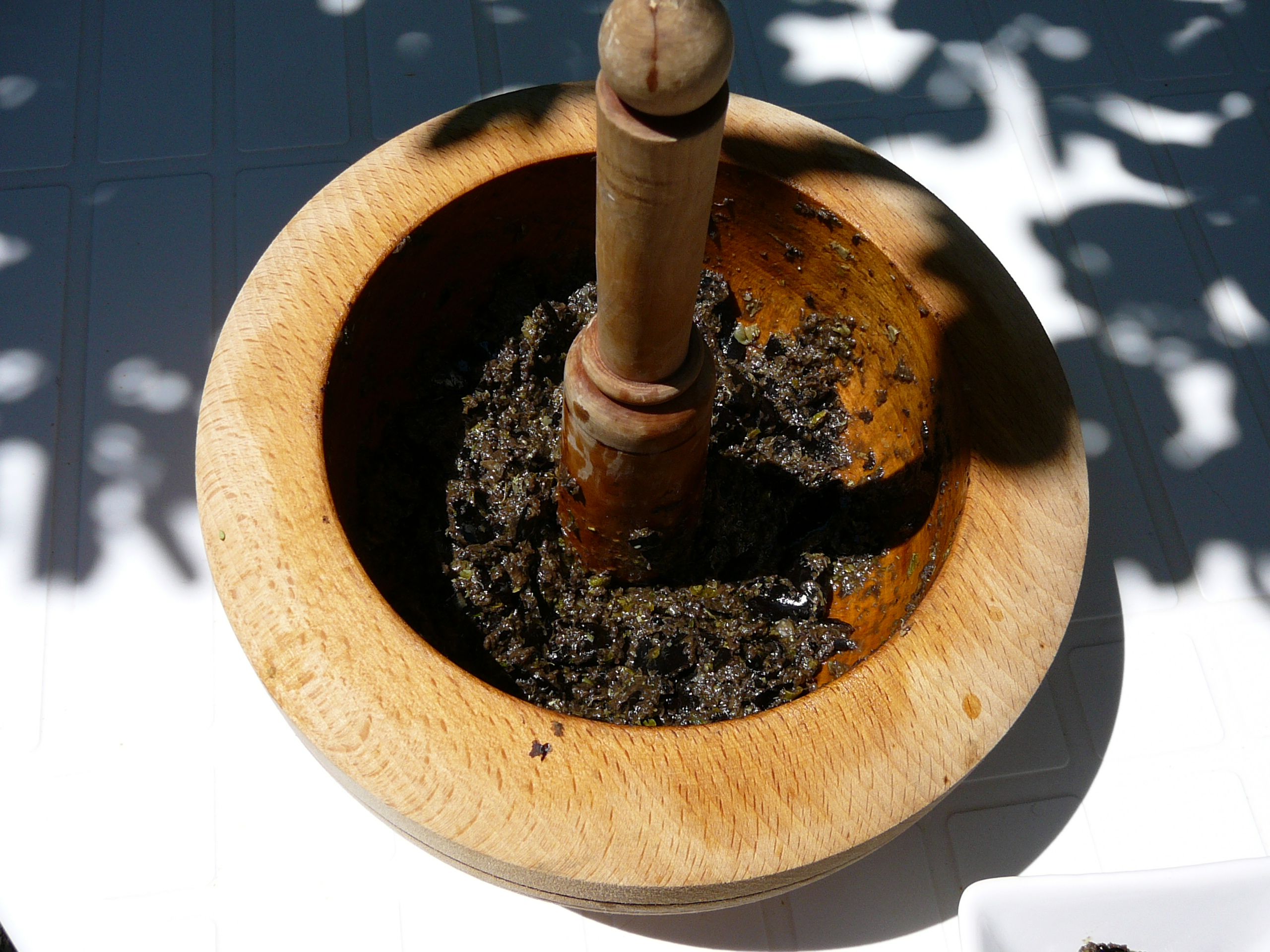
Tapenade in a mortar

Olive-based dishes can be found in ancient times. For example, Olivarum conditurae in Columella's De re rustica and epityrum from Cato the Elder were Greek dips adopted by the Romans that included olives but also many ingredients like celery, leeks, rue, mint, wine and vinegar.

Tapenade is based mainly on capers and olives. The word 'tapenade' comes from the Provençal word for capers: 'tapenos'

According to the culinary works of Provençal chefs Jean-Baptiste Reboul and Charles Julliard, the tapenade was created in 1880 by chef Meynier of the restaurant La Maison Dorée in Marseille. He pounded together an equal amount (200 grams) of capers and black olives to garnish hard-boiled egg halves, then incorporated anchovy fillets and marinated tuna (100 grams each). Spices, pepper, olive oil, and two glasses of cognac were then whisked in.

== Preparation ==
The base ingredients of tapenade are olives and capers. The olives (most commonly black) and capers are chopped finely, crushed, or minced in a food processor. Olive oil is gradually drizzled in until the mixture becomes a coarse paste.

Tapenade varies regionally, with ingredients such as garlic, herbs, anchovies, lemon juice, or brandy also incorporated.

== Serving ==
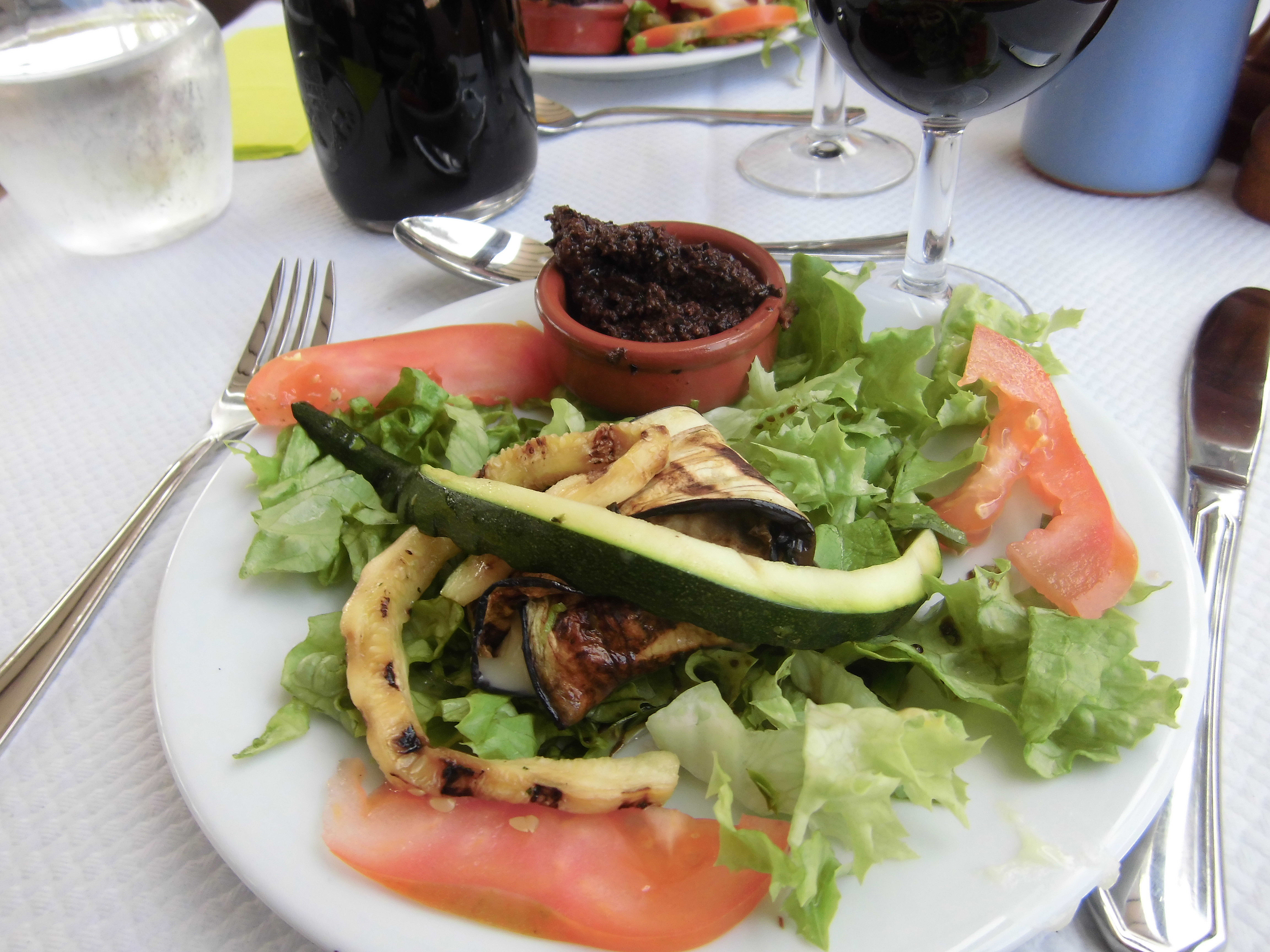
At a country bistro in Caseneuve, France, tapenade with eggplant salad

Tapenade may be served as an appetizer atop crusty bread, crackers, or crudités; incorporated in salad and fish dishes; and used as a condiment.

== In popular culture ==
In the 2007 Nickelodeon television series iCarly, tapenade features in the episode "iNevel", in which Carly Shay smears it on Nevel Papperman's face after he kisses her without permission.

== See also ==
- Relish
- List of spreads
- Mediterranean cuisine
