= Joseph-Louis Lambot =

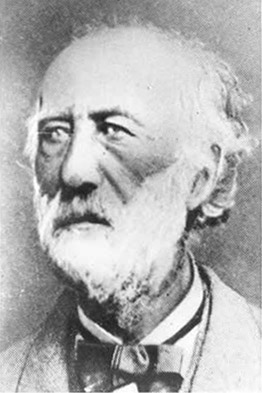
- Joseph Louis Lambot in 1880
- Born: Joseph-Louis Lambot; 22 May 1814; Montfort-sur-Argens, France
- Died: 2 August 1887 (aged 73); Brignoles, France
- Known for: Inventor of ferrocement
- Scientific career
- Fields: Materials Science

Joseph-Louis Lambot (English: /læmˈboʊ/, French: [ʒozɛf lwi lɑ̃bo]; born 22 May 1814 in Montfort sur Argens; died 2 August 1887 in Brignoles), is the inventor of ferro-cement, which led to the development of what is now known as reinforced concrete. He studied in Paris, where his uncle Baron Lambot was aide-de-camp to the Duke of Bourbon.

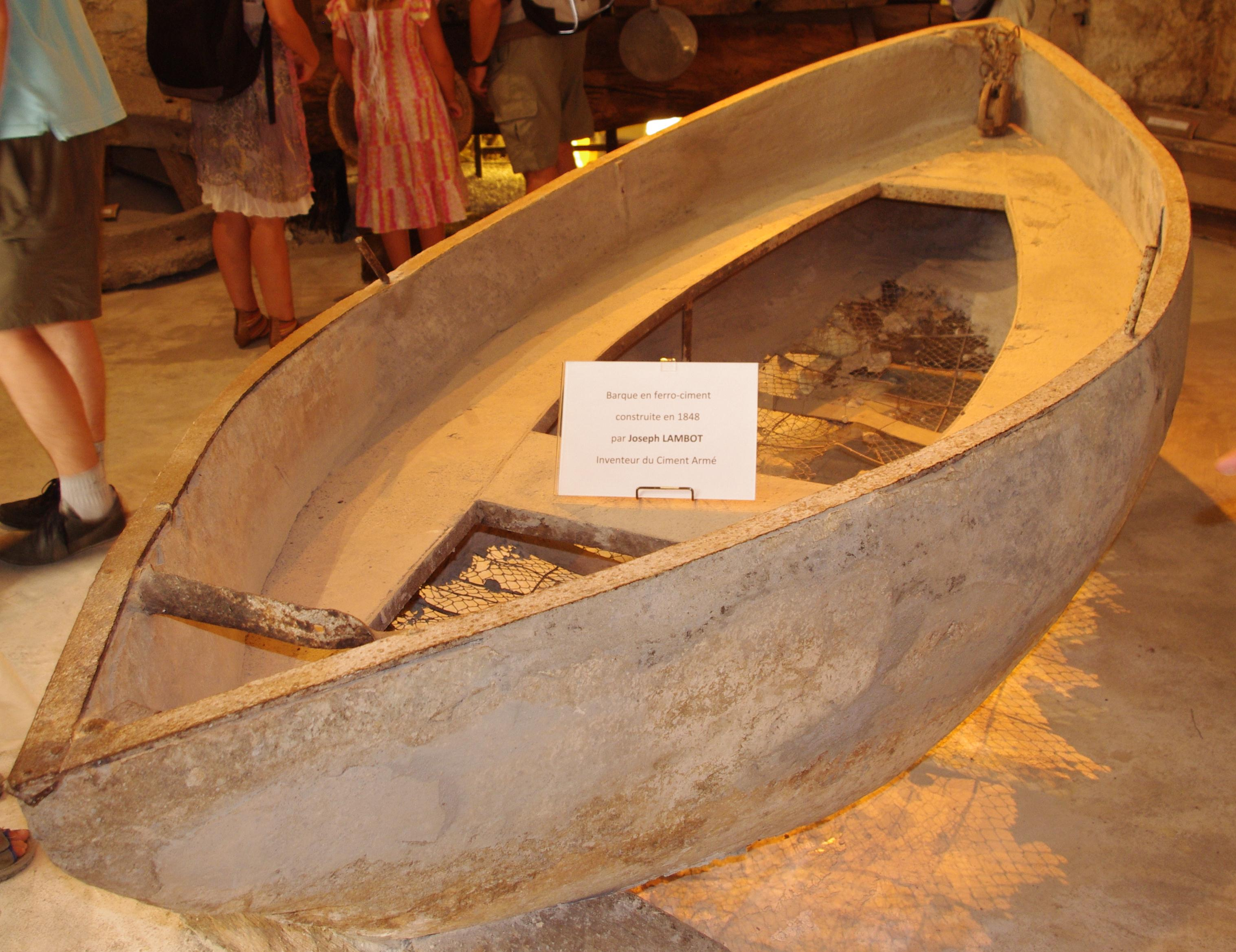
Invention in reinforced concrete started in the mid-nineteenth century with Joseph Lambot’s boat.

In 1841 he moved to his family's estate of Chateau Miraval in the Department of the Var (Southern France), where he devoted himself to agriculture. It is around that time that he started constructing water tanks and troughs using cement mortar (masonry) and iron reinforcement most likely in the form of iron rods, chicken wire (which was invented in Britain in 1844 and used for shipping crates) and possibly barrel bands that were easily available with the arrival of the machine age. In 1848 he constructed his first boat using the same system, which he tested on ponds on the estate. This boat was patented on 30 January 1855 and presented at the 1855 World's Fair in Paris (Exposition Universelle - 1855). Unfortunately, his patents went no further and were superseded by patents of Joseph Monier. The original prototype is preserved at the Museum of Brignoles. Robert Courland describes in his book Concrete Planet that Lambot's boat sank and was preserved in anaerobic mud at the bottom of the lake. The boat was recovered more than a hundred years later.

His birthplace in Montfort-sur-Argens is now "Maison Lambot" BnB.
