= Joseph-Alphonse-Omer de Valbelle =

Aristocrat and military officer

- Born: 18 June 1729; Aix-en-Provence, Bouches-du-Rhône, Provence-Alpes-Côte d'Azur, France
- Died: 18 November 1818 (aged 89); Paris, Île-de-France, France
- Resting place: Chartreuse de Montrieux, Méounes-lès-Montrieux, Var, Provence-Alpes-Côte d'Azur, France
- Occupation: Military officer

Joseph-Alphonse-Omer de Valbelle (1729–1818) was a French aristocrat and military officer.

== Biography ==
=== Early life ===
Joseph-Alphonse-Omer de Valbelle was born on 18 June 1729 in Aix-en-Provence. His father was André Geoffroy de Valbelle and his mother, Marguerite-Delphine de Valbelle. He had a brother, Joseph-Ignage-Cosme de Valbelle, and a sister, Anne Alphonsine de Valbelle.

=== Career ===
He served as a mestre de camp in 1749, maréchal de camp in 1762, followed by Lieutenant general of Provence.

After his brother's death in 1766, he inherited the marquisates of Tourves, Rians, Montfuron, Bressuire, the Baronetcies of Saint-Symphorien-sur-Coise and Meyrargues, the Countom of Oraison, Valbelle, Sainte-Tulles, Cadarache, Rougiers, Venelles, Peyrolles-en-Provence, Mousteyret, Levens, Reveste, Cucuron, etc.

=== Personal life ===
He resided in a hôtel particulier on the Rue du Bac in Paris. He also resided at the family Hôtel de Valbelle in Aix-en-Provence. Additionally, he resided at the family castle, Château des Valbelles in Tourves. He had an affair with La Clairon (1723–1803) and bequeathed her 4,000 French livres after his death.

He died of apoplexy on 18 November 1818 in Paris. He was buried in the Chartreuse de Montrieux, a monastery in Méounes-lès-Montrieux.
