= Rocbaron =

- Commune
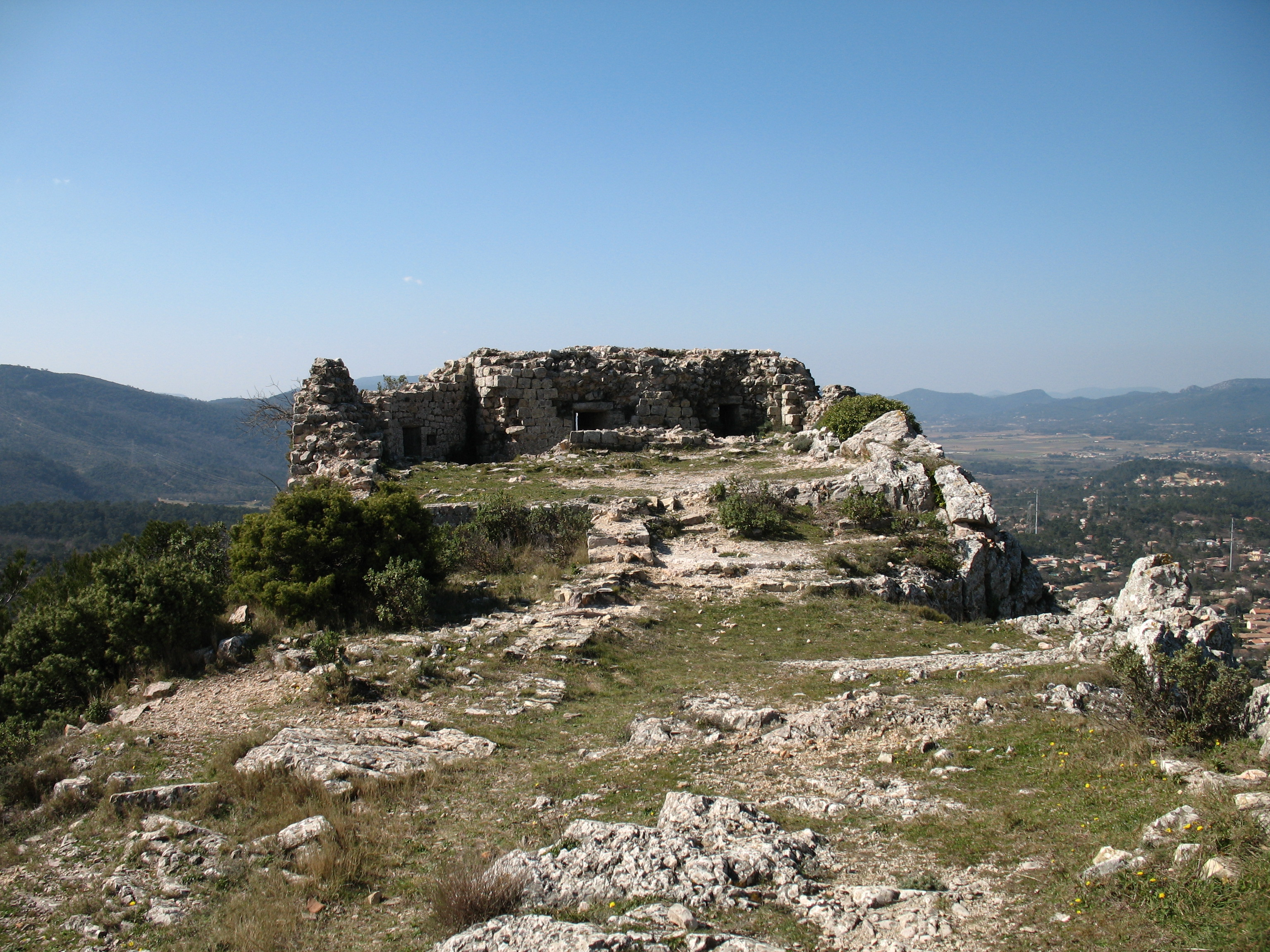
- Ruins of St Sauveur Castle, in Rocbaron

- Coat of arms
- Location of Rocbaron
- Location within France Location within Provence-Alpes-Côte d'Azur
- Coordinates: 43°18′18″N 6°05′30″E
- Country: France
- Region: Provence-Alpes-Côte d'Azur
- Department: Var
- Arrondissement: Brignoles
- Canton: Garéoult
- Intercommunality: CA Provence Verte

Government
  - Mayor (2020–2026): Jean-Claude Felix
- Area^{1}: 20.28 km^{2} (7.83 sq mi)
- Elevation: 370 m (1,210 ft)
- Highest elevation: 592 m (1,942 ft)
- Lowest elevation: 272 m (892 ft)
- Population (2023): 5,660
  - Density: 279/km^{2} (723/sq mi)
- Time zone: UTC+01:00 (CET)
  - Summer (DST): UTC+02:00 (CEST)
- INSEE/Postal code: 83106 /83136
- ^{1} French Land Register data, which excludes lakes, ponds, glaciers > 1 km^{2} (0.386 sq mi or 247 acres) and river estuaries.

Rocbaron (French pronunciation: [ʁɔkbaʁɔ̃]; Occitan: Ròcbaron) is a commune in the Var department in the Provence-Alpes-Côte d'Azur region in southeastern France.

== Population ==
Historical population
Year	Pop.	±% p.a.
1968	222	—
1975	310	+4.89%
1982	778	+14.05%
1990	1,774	+10.85%
1999	3,026	+6.11%
2007	3,361	+1.32%
2012	4,059	+3.85%
2017	5,033	+4.40%
2023	5,660	+1.98%
Source: INSEE

== See also ==
- Communes of the Var department
