= Mazaugues =

- Commune
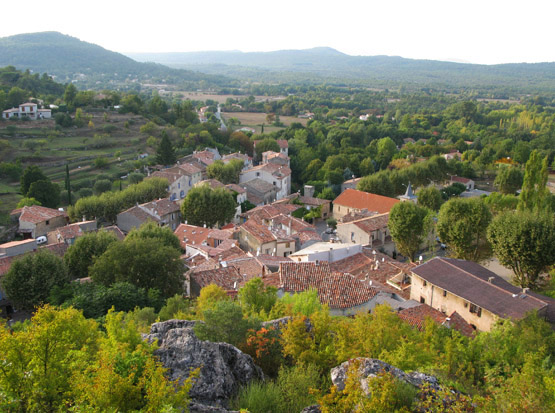
- A view of the village from the castle

- Coat of arms
- Location of Mazaugues
- Location within France Location within Provence-Alpes-Côte d'Azur
- Coordinates: 43°20′55″N 5°55′21″E
- Country: France
- Region: Provence-Alpes-Côte d'Azur
- Department: Var
- Arrondissement: Brignoles
- Canton: Garéoult
- Intercommunality: CA Provence Verte

Government
  - Mayor (2020–2026): Laurent Gueit
- Area^{1}: 53.79 km^{2} (20.77 sq mi)
- Elevation: 420 m (1,380 ft)
- Highest elevation: 1,055 m (3,461 ft)
- Lowest elevation: 312 m (1,024 ft)
- Population (2023): 901
  - Density: 16.8/km^{2} (43.4/sq mi)
- Time zone: UTC+01:00 (CET)
  - Summer (DST): UTC+02:00 (CEST)
- INSEE/Postal code: 83076 /83136
- ^{1} French Land Register data, which excludes lakes, ponds, glaciers > 1 km^{2} (0.386 sq mi or 247 acres) and river estuaries.

Mazaugues (French pronunciation: [mazog]; Occitan: Masaugas) is a commune in the Var department in the Provence-Alpes-Côte d'Azur region in southeastern France.

== See also ==
- Communes of the Var department
