= Hôtel de Valbelle =

Coordinates: 43.5309°N 5.4507°E

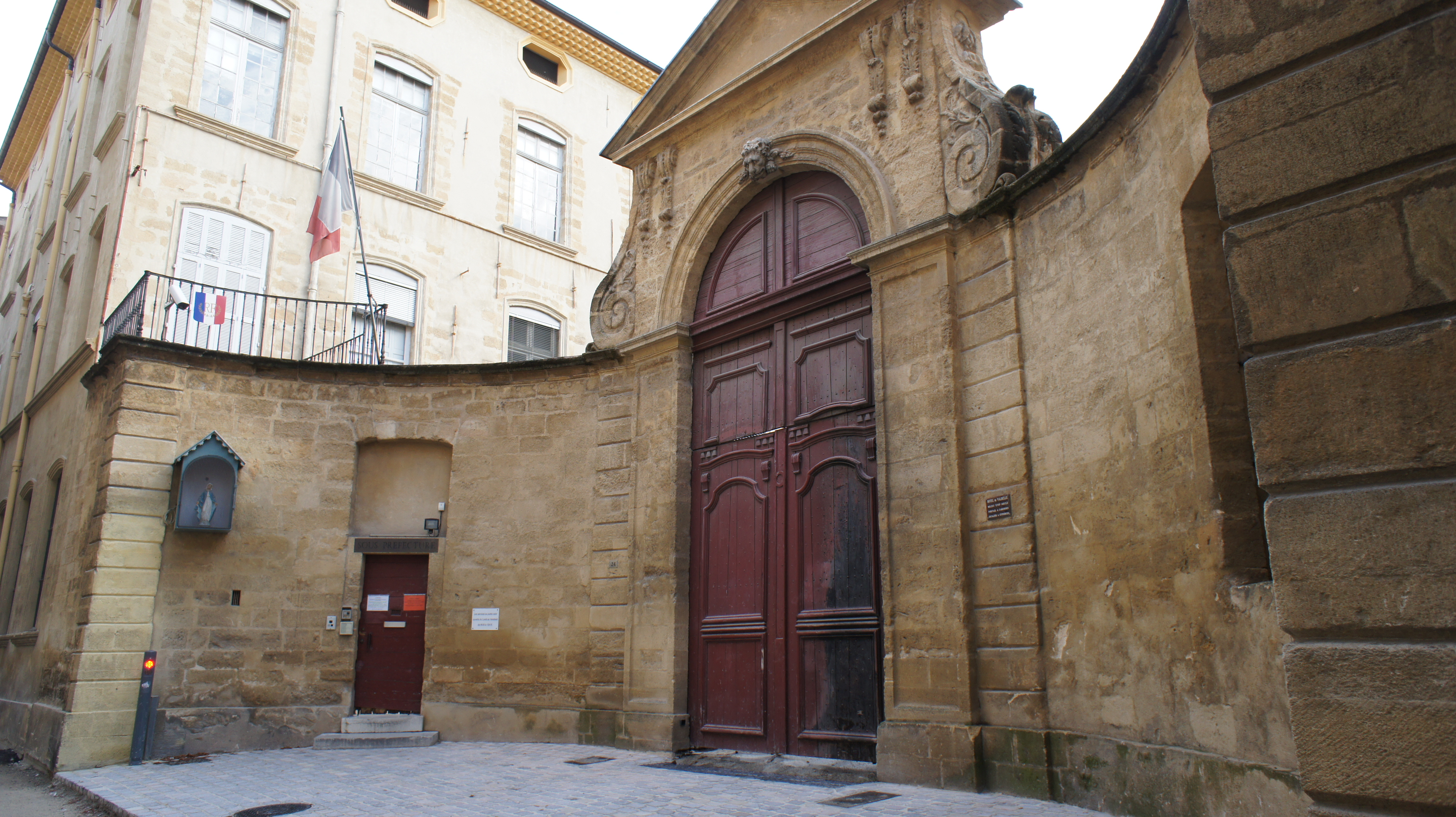
- Main door to the Hôtel de Valbelle
- Interactive map of the Hôtel de Valbelle area

General information
- Type: Hôtel particulier
- Location: 24, Rue Mignet, Aix-en-Provence, France
- Completed: 1655
- Client: Joseph-Anne de Valbelle de Tourves
- Owner: French state

The Hôtel de Valbelle is a listed hôtel particulier in Aix-en-Provence.

== Location ==
It is located at 24, rue Mignet on one side and the rue Lisse-Saint-Louis on the other side, in Aix-en-Provence.

== History ==
It was built for Joseph-Anne de Valbelle de Tourves (1648-1722) in 1655, when he was only seven years old. He later served as President a mortier of the Parlement of Aix-en-Provence. The hotel was restored and expanded by his great-grandson, Joseph-Alphonse-Omer de Valbelle (1729-1818), in the eighteenth century.

It currently houses the under-prefecture. As of June 2013, the sous-prefecture is hoping to sell it for €9 million, while the city council would only be willing to purchase it for €3.5 million; thus its future ownership is uncertain.

== Heritage significance ==
It has been listed as a monument historique since 1983.
