= Carcès =

- Commune
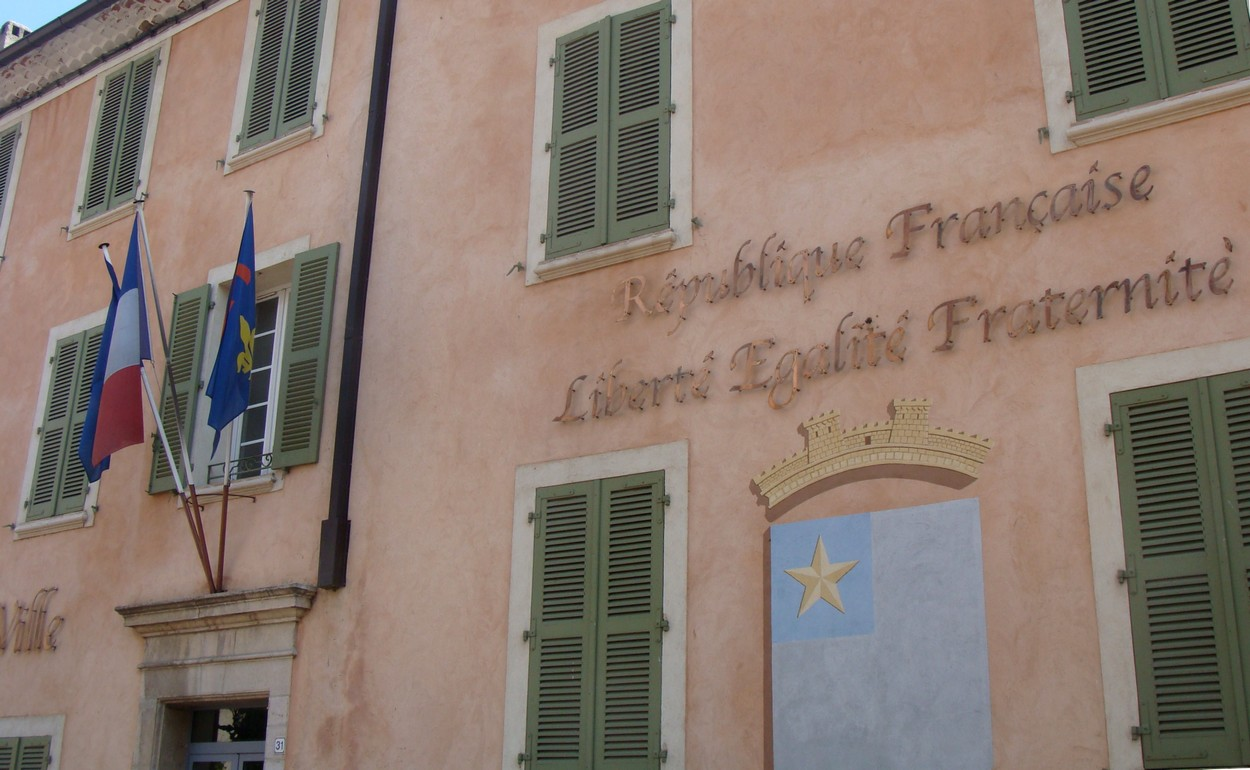
- The front of the town hall of Carcès

- Coat of arms
- Location of Carcès
- Location within France Location within Provence-Alpes-Côte d'Azur
- Coordinates: 43°28′37″N 6°11′01″E
- Country: France
- Region: Provence-Alpes-Côte d'Azur
- Department: Var
- Arrondissement: Brignoles
- Canton: Brignoles
- Intercommunality: CA Provence Verte

Government
  - Mayor (2020–2026): Alain Ravanello
- Area^{1}: 35.76 km^{2} (13.81 sq mi)
- Elevation: 138 m (453 ft)
- Highest elevation: 396 m (1,299 ft)
- Lowest elevation: 110 m (360 ft)
- Population (2023): 3,540
  - Density: 99.0/km^{2} (256/sq mi)
- Time zone: UTC+01:00 (CET)
  - Summer (DST): UTC+02:00 (CEST)
- INSEE/Postal code: 83032 /83570
- ^{1} French Land Register data, which excludes lakes, ponds, glaciers > 1 km^{2} (0.386 sq mi or 247 acres) and river estuaries.

Carcès (French pronunciation: [kaʁsɛs]; Occitan: Carces) is a commune in the Var department in the Provence-Alpes-Côte d'Azur region in southeastern France.

== Population ==
Historical population
| Year | Pop. | ±% p.a. |
|---|---|---|
| 1968 | 2,026 | — |
| 1975 | 1,807 | −1.62% |
| 1982 | 2,092 | +2.11% |
| 1990 | 2,270 | +1.03% |
| 1999 | 2,453 | +0.87% |
| 2007 | 2,988 | +2.50% |
| 2012 | 3,386 | +2.53% |
| 2017 | 3,447 | +0.36% |
| 2023 | 3,540 | +0.44% |
Source: INSEE

Inhabitants are known in French as Carçois and Carçoises.

== See also ==
- Communes of the Var department
