= Sainte-Anastasie-sur-Issole =

- Commune
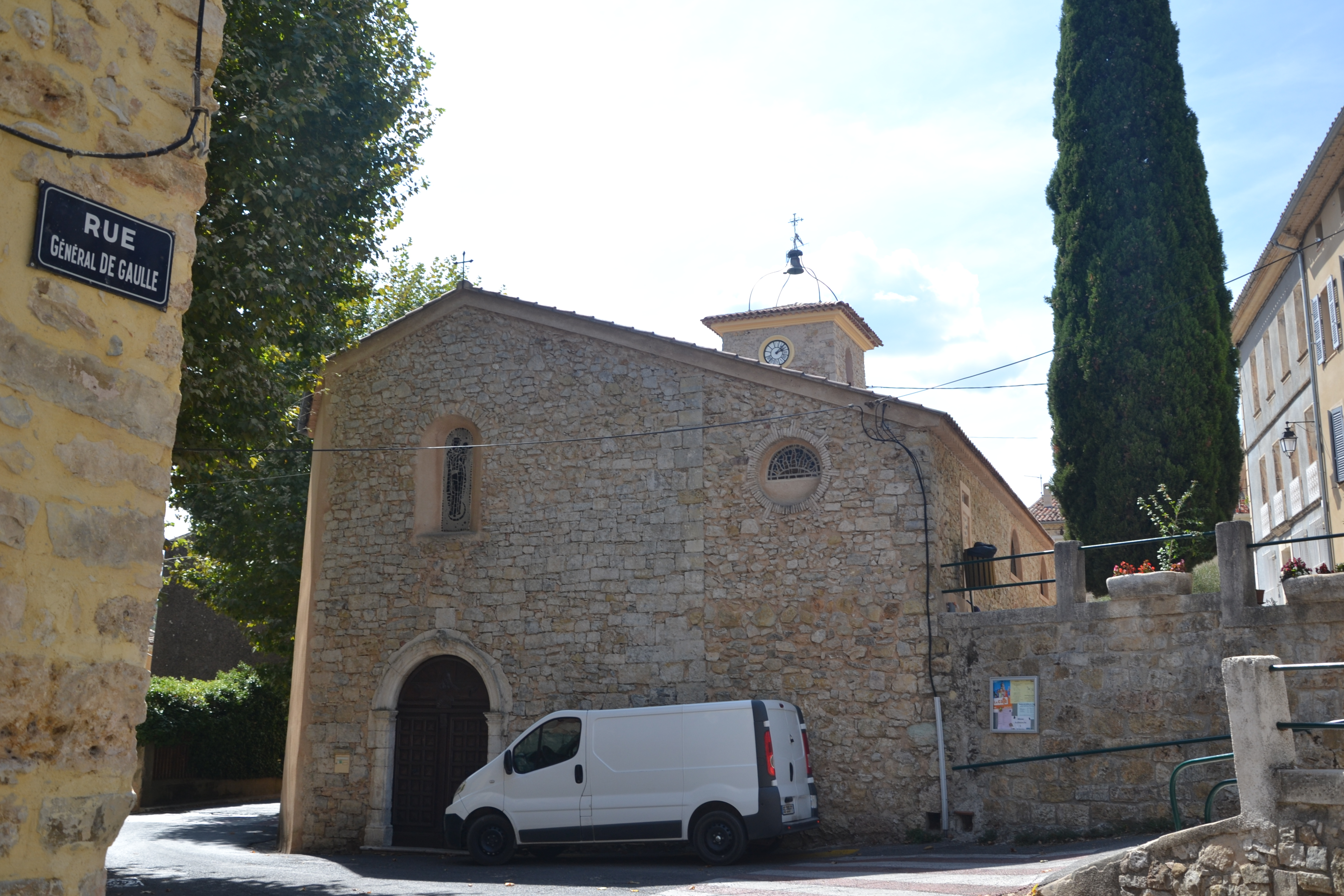

- Coat of arms
- Location of Sainte-Anastasie-sur-Issole
- Location within France Location within Provence-Alpes-Côte d'Azur
- Coordinates: 43°20′36″N 6°07′32″E
- Country: France
- Region: Provence-Alpes-Côte d'Azur
- Department: Var
- Arrondissement: Brignoles
- Canton: Garéoult
- Intercommunality: CA Provence Verte

Government
  - Mayor (2023–2026): Frédéric Toussaint
- Area^{1}: 10.71 km^{2} (4.14 sq mi)
- Elevation: 275 m (902 ft)
- Highest elevation: 580 m (1,900 ft)
- Lowest elevation: 269 m (883 ft)
- Population (2023): 2,165
  - Density: 202.1/km^{2} (523.6/sq mi)
- Time zone: UTC+01:00 (CET)
  - Summer (DST): UTC+02:00 (CEST)
- INSEE/Postal code: 83111 /83136
- ^{1} French Land Register data, which excludes lakes, ponds, glaciers > 1 km^{2} (0.386 sq mi or 247 acres) and river estuaries.

Sainte-Anastasie-sur-Issole (French pronunciation: [sɛ̃t anastazi syʁ isɔl], lit. 'Sainte-Anastasie on Issole'; Provençal: Santa Anastasia d'Içòla) is a commune in the Var department in the Provence-Alpes-Côte d'Azur region in southeastern France.

== Population ==
Historical population
Year	Pop.	±% p.a.
1968	318	—
1975	313	−0.23%
1982	754	+13.38%
1990	1,205	+6.04%
1999	1,532	+2.70%
2007	1,810	+2.11%
2012	1,882	+0.78%
2017	1,973	+0.95%
2023	2,165	+1.56%
Source: INSEE

== See also ==
- Communes of the Var department
