= Canton of Brignoles =

Canton of France

Coordinates: 43.41°N 6.06°E

The canton of Brignoles is an administrative division of the Var department, southeastern France. Its borders were modified at the French canton reorganisation which came into effect in March 2015. Its seat is in Brignoles.

It consists of the following communes:

1. Brignoles
2. Carcès
3. La Celle
4. Correns
5. Cotignac
6. Entrecasteaux
7. Montfort-sur-Argens
8. Rougiers
9. Saint-Antonin-du-Var
10. Tourves
11. Le Val
12. Vins-sur-Caramy
