= Hugh Ian Macgarvie-Munn =

Guatemalan diplomat (1919–1981)

Hugh Ian McGarvie-Munn (22 September 1919 in Jamadoba, India – 4 January 1981 in Entrecasteaux, France). He was a captain in the Seaforth Highlanders, artist, naval architect and also served as a Guatemalan diplomat. His father was born in Scotland and was chief consultant engineer to the Viceroy of India.

== Career ==
Following the murder of Colonel Carlos Castillo Armas, McGarvie-Munn's father-in-law Miguel Ydígoras Fuentes was elected, on 2 March 1958, Constitutional President of Guatemala. Fuentes was incensed by illegal fishing by Mexicans on Guatemala's Pacific coast, and two Mexican fishing boats were sunk by the Guatemalan Air Force. He challenged the Mexican president to a duel on the border to settle the matter, and decided that Guatemala needed a navy.

McGarvie-Munn was an artist and member of the Royal Institution of Naval Architects, an association of naval architects. Fuentes founded the Guatemalan Navy and made McGarvie-Munn briefly the Commander in Chief of the Navy.

In 1974 McGarvie-Munn acquired the seventeenth-century Château of Entrecasteaux in Var, southeast France, which became his principal residence. Hugh Ian McGarvie-Munn and his son Iain Lachlan McGarvie-Munn immediately began the restoration of this château which had fallen into ruin and opened it to the public.

== Personal life ==
In 1947 he married Carmen Atala Maria Ydígoras Laparra, the daughter of María Teresa and General and engineer Miguel Ydígoras Fuentes.

== Death and legacy ==
Upon McGarvie-Munn's death his son continued the restoration. It was largely due to their efforts that Entrecasteaux has become a popular destination for artists and tourists.
