= Entrecasteaux =

Entrecasteaux Entrecastèus (Occitan)
- Commune
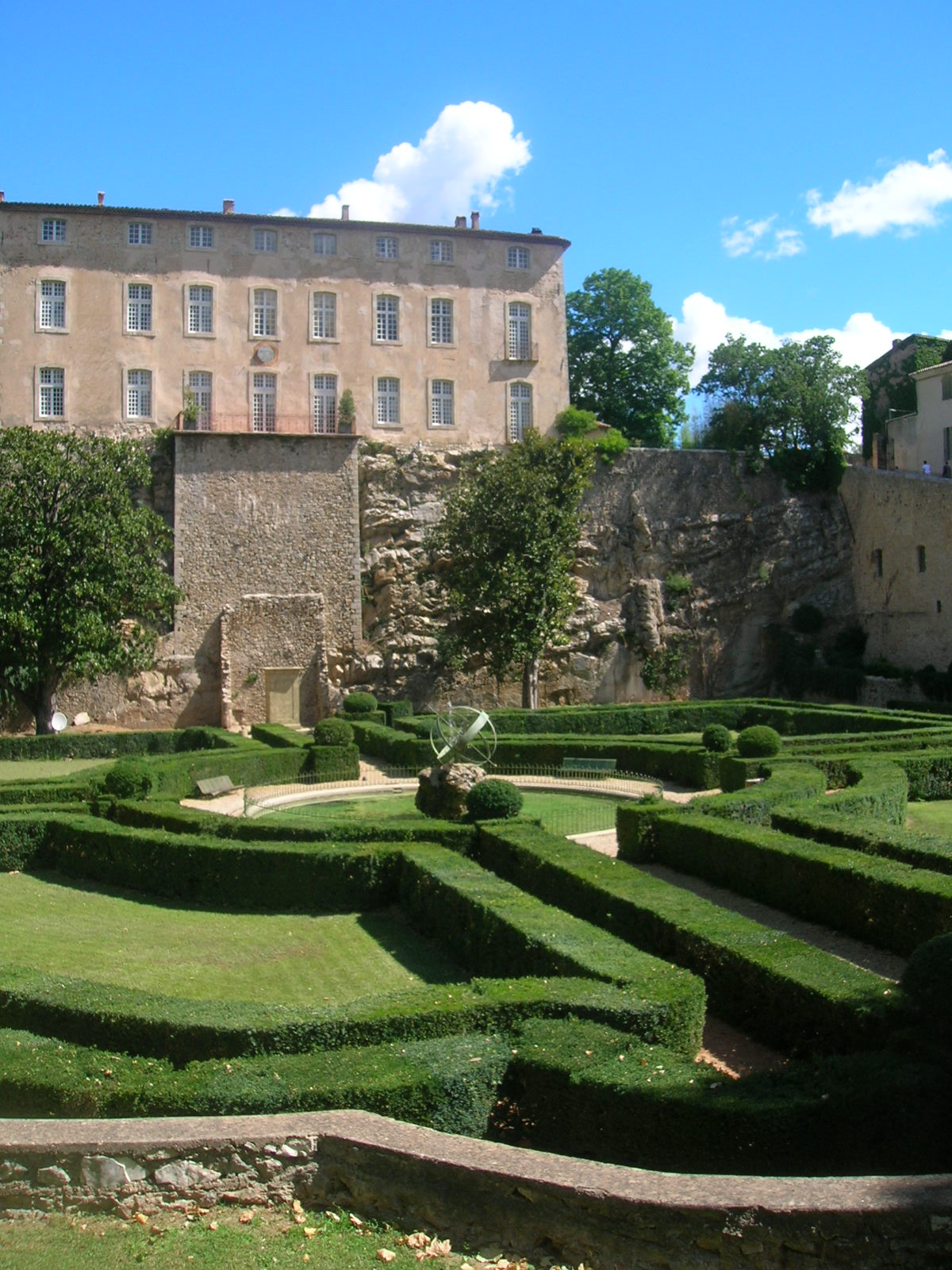
- Château d'Entrecasteaux

- Coat of arms
- Location of Entrecasteaux
- Location within France Location within Provence-Alpes-Côte d'Azur
- Coordinates: 43°31′00″N 6°14′33″E
- Country: France
- Region: Provence-Alpes-Côte d'Azur
- Department: Var
- Arrondissement: Brignoles
- Canton: Brignoles
- Intercommunality: CA Provence Verte

Government
  - Mayor (2020–2026): Romain Debray
- Area^{1}: 32.11 km^{2} (12.40 sq mi)
- Highest elevation: 354 m (1,161 ft)
- Lowest elevation: 97 m (318 ft)
- Population (2023): 1,118
  - Density: 34.82/km^{2} (90.18/sq mi)
- Time zone: UTC+01:00 (CET)
  - Summer (DST): UTC+02:00 (CEST)
- INSEE/Postal code: 83051 /83570
- ^{1} French Land Register data, which excludes lakes, ponds, glaciers > 1 km^{2} (0.386 sq mi or 247 acres) and river estuaries.

Entrecasteaux (French pronunciation: [ɑ̃tʁəkasto]; Occitan: Entrecastèus) is a commune in the Var department in Provence-Alpes-Côte d'Azur region in Southeastern France. As of 2023, the population of the commune was 1,118.

It is noted for its public square designed by Le Nôtre, as well as its 17th-century château, restored by Scottish artist Ian MacGarvie-Munn.

== Geography ==
=== Climate ===
Entrecasteaux has a hot-summer Mediterranean climate (Köppen climate classification Csa). The average annual temperature in Entrecasteaux is 14.9 °C (58.8 °F). The average annual rainfall is 804.5 mm (31.67 in) with November as the wettest month. The temperatures are highest on average in July, at around 24.2 °C (75.6 °F), and lowest in January, at around 6.9 °C (44.4 °F). The highest temperature ever recorded in Entrecasteaux was 43.9 °C (111.0 °F) on 7 July 1982; the coldest temperature ever recorded was −10.0 °C (14.0 °F) on yy February 2012.

Climate data for Entrecasteaux (1991−2020 normals, extremes 1997−present)
Month	Jan	Feb	Mar	Apr	May	Jun	Jul	Aug	Sep	Oct	Nov	Dec	Year
Record high °C (°F)	22.4 (72.3)	24.9 (76.8)	27.6 (81.7)	29.3 (84.7)	34.5 (94.1)	41.0 (105.8)	43.9 (111.0)	41.5 (106.7)	36.5 (97.7)	33.7 (92.7)	23.5 (74.3)	21.7 (71.1)	43.9 (111.0)
Mean daily maximum °C (°F)	12.0 (53.6)	13.3 (55.9)	16.8 (62.2)	19.8 (67.6)	24.0 (75.2)	28.8 (83.8)	32.1 (89.8)	32.1 (89.8)	26.9 (80.4)	21.5 (70.7)	15.5 (59.9)	12.2 (54.0)	21.2 (70.2)
Daily mean °C (°F)	6.9 (44.4)	7.5 (45.5)	10.5 (50.9)	13.4 (56.1)	17.3 (63.1)	21.5 (70.7)	24.2 (75.6)	24.1 (75.4)	19.9 (67.8)	15.7 (60.3)	10.5 (50.9)	7.4 (45.3)	14.9 (58.8)
Mean daily minimum °C (°F)	1.8 (35.2)	1.7 (35.1)	4.1 (39.4)	6.9 (44.4)	10.6 (51.1)	14.1 (57.4)	16.3 (61.3)	16.1 (61.0)	12.8 (55.0)	9.9 (49.8)	5.5 (41.9)	2.5 (36.5)	8.5 (47.3)
Record low °C (°F)	−8.2 (17.2)	−10.0 (14.0)	−9.3 (15.3)	−3.5 (25.7)	2.6 (36.7)	6.3 (43.3)	8.7 (47.7)	8.3 (46.9)	3.5 (38.3)	−3.6 (25.5)	−5.7 (21.7)	−8.2 (17.2)	−10.0 (14.0)
Average precipitation mm (inches)	59.0 (2.32)	50.0 (1.97)	51.7 (2.04)	70.2 (2.76)	81.4 (3.20)	59.1 (2.33)	19.7 (0.78)	30.3 (1.19)	60.0 (2.36)	110.5 (4.35)	141.1 (5.56)	71.5 (2.81)	804.5 (31.67)
Average precipitation days (≥ 1.0 mm)	5.7	5.7	5.6	7.1	7.1	4.1	2.4	3.2	4.7	6.8	8.4	6.0	66.6
Source: Météo-France

== See also ==
- Communes of the Var department
