= Canton of Garéoult =

Coordinates: 43.33°N 6.05°E

The canton of Garéoult is an administrative division of the Var department, southeastern France. It was created at the French canton reorganisation which came into effect in March 2015. Its seat is in Garéoult.

It consists of the following communes:

1. Camps-la-Source
2. Carnoules
3. Forcalqueiret
4. Garéoult
5. Mazaugues
6. Méounes-lès-Montrieux
7. Néoules
8. Pierrefeu-du-Var
9. Puget-Ville
10. Rocbaron
11. La Roquebrussanne
12. Sainte-Anastasie-sur-Issole
