= Communauté d'agglomération de la Provence Verte =

Provence Verte
- Communauté d'agglomération
- Interactive map of Provence Verte
- Coordinates: 43°24′N 06°03′E
- Country: France
- Region: Provence-Alpes-Côte d'Azur
- Department: Var
- No. of communes: {{{nbcomm}}}
- Established: 2017
- Area: 947.5 km^{2} (365.8 sq mi)
- Population (2017): 98,529
  - Density: 104.0/km^{2} (269.3/sq mi)
- Website: www.caprovenceverte.fr

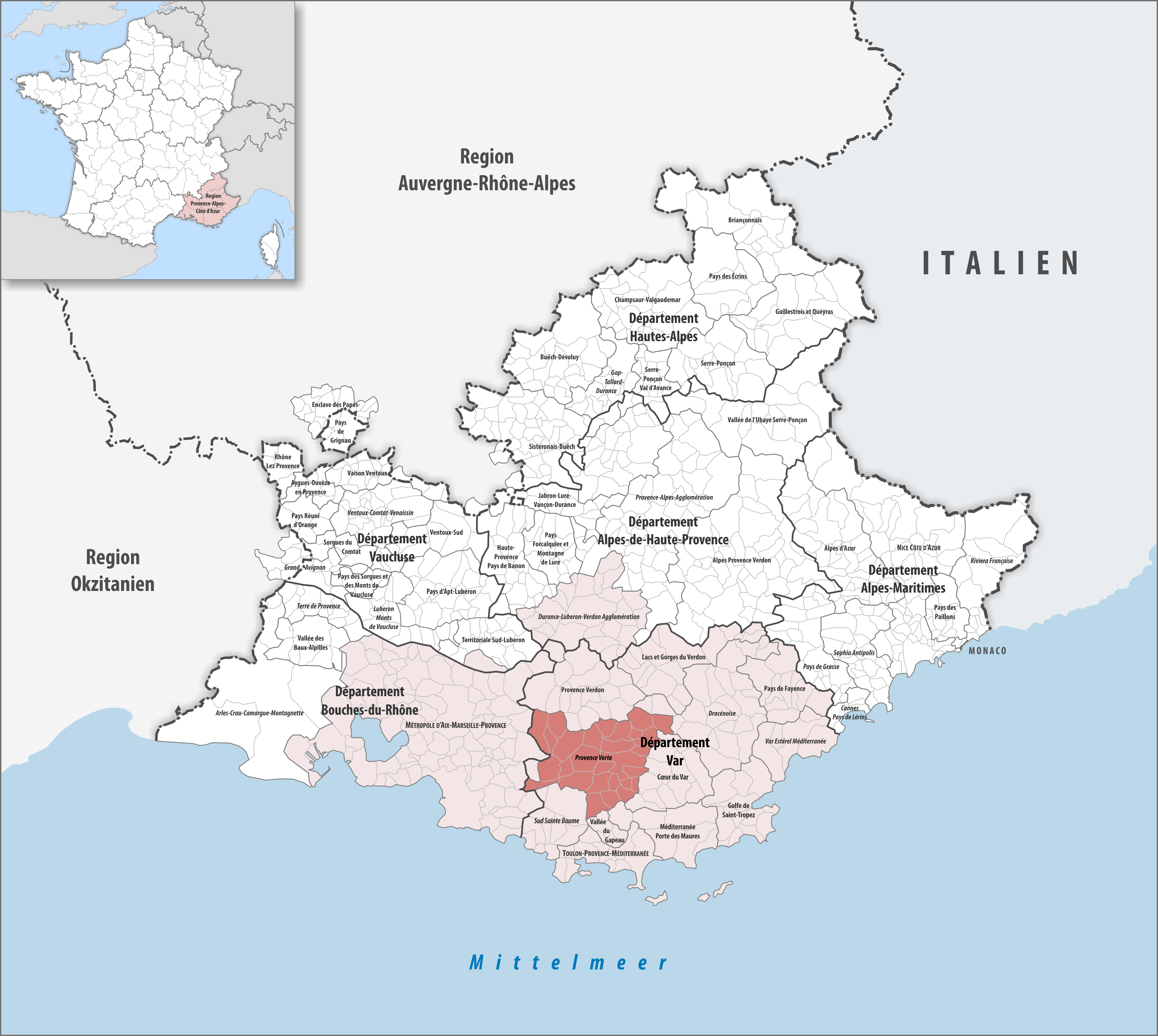
Location of the Provence Verte Community Association

Communauté d'agglomération de la Provence Verte is an intercommunal structure, centred on the cities of Brignoles and Saint-Maximin-la-Sainte-Baume. It is located in the Var department, in the Provence-Alpes-Côte d'Azur region, southeastern France. It was created in January 2017. Its seat is in Brignoles. Its area is 947.5 km^{2}. Its population was 98,529 in 2017, of which 17,179 in Brignoles proper.

== Composition ==
The communauté d'agglomération consists of the following 28 communes:

1. Bras
2. Brignoles
3. Camps-la-Source
4. Carcès
5. La Celle
6. Châteauvert
7. Correns
8. Cotignac
9. Entrecasteaux
10. Forcalqueiret
11. Garéoult
12. Mazaugues
13. Méounes-lès-Montrieux
14. Montfort-sur-Argens
15. Nans-les-Pins
16. Néoules
17. Ollières
18. Plan-d'Aups-Sainte-Baume
19. Pourcieux
20. Pourrières
21. Rocbaron
22. La Roquebrussanne
23. Rougiers
24. Sainte-Anastasie-sur-Issole
25. Saint-Maximin-la-Sainte-Baume
26. Tourves
27. Le Val
28. Vins-sur-Caramy
