= Vins-sur-Caramy =

- Commune
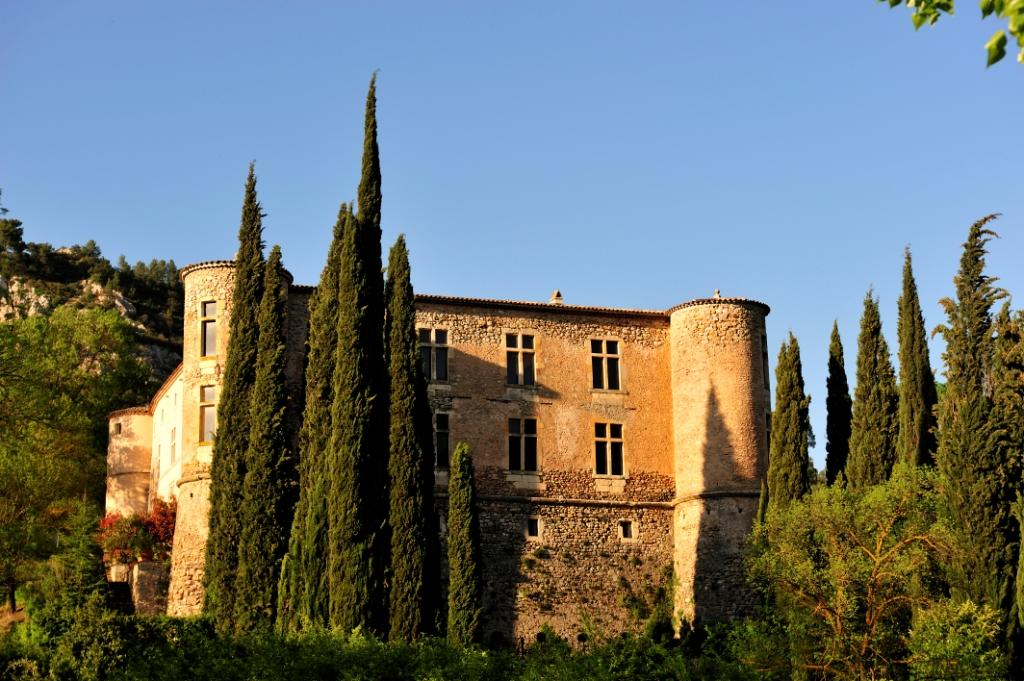
- The Château of Vins-sur-Caramy

- Coat of arms
- Location of Vins-sur-Caramy
- Location within France Location within Provence-Alpes-Côte d'Azur
- Coordinates: 43°26′05″N 6°08′33″E
- Country: France
- Region: Provence-Alpes-Côte d'Azur
- Department: Var
- Arrondissement: Brignoles
- Canton: Brignoles
- Intercommunality: CA Provence Verte

Government
  - Mayor (2020–2026): Jean-Luc Bonnet
- Area^{1}: 16.3 km^{2} (6.3 sq mi)
- Elevation: 156 m (512 ft)
- Highest elevation: 396 m (1,299 ft)
- Lowest elevation: 170 m (560 ft)
- Population (2023): 936
  - Density: 57.4/km^{2} (149/sq mi)
- Time zone: UTC+01:00 (CET)
  - Summer (DST): UTC+02:00 (CEST)
- INSEE/Postal code: 83151 /83170
- ^{1} French Land Register data, which excludes lakes, ponds, glaciers > 1 km^{2} (0.386 sq mi or 247 acres) and river estuaries.

Vins-sur-Caramy (Occitan: Vin sus Caramy) is a commune in the Var department in the Provence-Alpes-Côte d'Azur region in southeastern France.

== See also ==
- Communes of the Var department
