= Jean-Baptiste Reboul =

French chef (1862–1926)

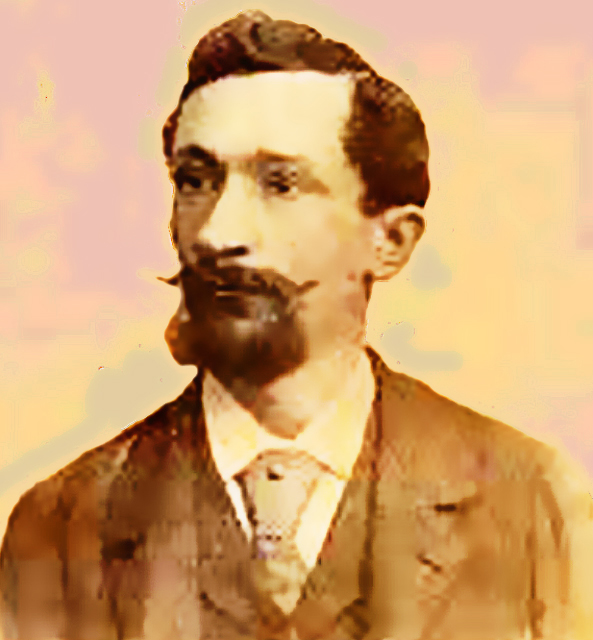

Jean-Baptiste Joseph Marius Reboul (French pronunciation: [ʒɑ̃ batist ʒozɛf maʁjys ʁəbul]; 12 April 1862 in La Roquebrussanne (Var) – 1926 in Marseille) was a French chef. He is known for his book compiling over 1,000 Provençal recipes and 365 menus.

== Biography ==
Reboul was a cook in the hotel Montreux on Lake Geneva, and he shared his seasonal work between Switzerland and Provence before moving to Marseille in 1884. He became chef at the Hotel de Castille and then at the Hotel du Luxembourg. From 1900 and until the end of his career, he was the head of the family home of Noilly Prat.

Jean-Baptiste Reboul gathered Provençal recipes in his book La Cuisinière provençale; the first edition in 1897 was an instant success. A copy of the sixth edition of 1910 was sent to the poet Frédéric Mistral, creator of Museon Arlaten, a museum of Provençal culture in Arles. He asked Reboul to add the names of Provençal dishes, which would be made in subsequent editions.

The book includes 1,120 recipes and 365 menus. It was published in 24 editions (250,000 copies), sometimes under the title La Cuisinière du Midi and is still regularly reprinted.
