= Gabrielle Démians d'Archimbaud =

French archaeologist (1929–2017)

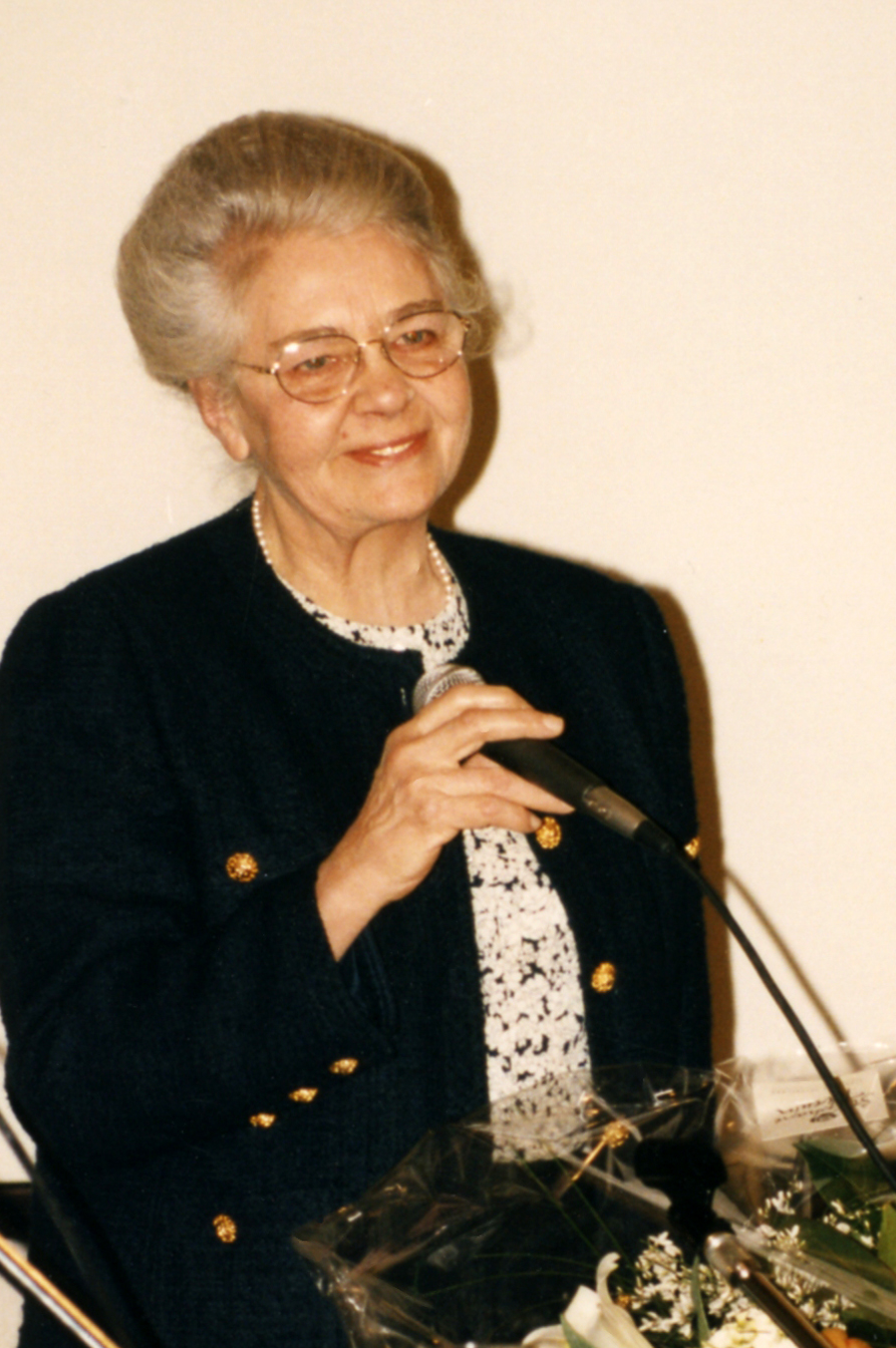
- Gabrielle Démians d'Archimbaud in 1995
- Born: 6 September 1929; Quillan, France
- Died: 1 August 2017 (aged 87); Aix-en-Provence, France
- Occupations: Archaeologist; Academic

Academic work
- Discipline: Archaeology
- Sub-discipline: Medieval archaeology

Gabrielle Démians d'Archimbaud (6 September 1929 – 1 August 2017) was a French archaeologist specialising in deserted medieval villages and religious buildings. She was a pioneer of the study of material culture in the Middle Ages and Professor emerita of History of Art.

== Career ==
d'Archimbaud begun her teaching career at Lycée Georges Clemenceau in Montpellier from 1957-1958. From 1958 to 1960 she worked at the Lycée des Prêcheurs in Aix-en-Provence.

d'Archimbaud was a prolific field archaeologist. From 1961 to 1968 she excavated the Castrum Saint-Jean and from 1964 to 1972 the Chapelle de La Gayole in La Celle, Var. She researched and excavated at the Abbey of St Victor, Marseille from 1970 to 1978, the Oppidum de Saint-Blaise at Saint-Mitre-les-Remparts from 1980 to 1984, and at the Notre-Dame-du-Bourg cathedral in Digne-les-Bains from 1983 to 2004.

She was admitted to the Ordre des Arts et des Lettres with the rank of Chevalier (knight) in January 1989 and promoted to Officier (officer) in February 2016.
