= Cotignac =

Cotignac Cotinhac (Occitan)
- Commune
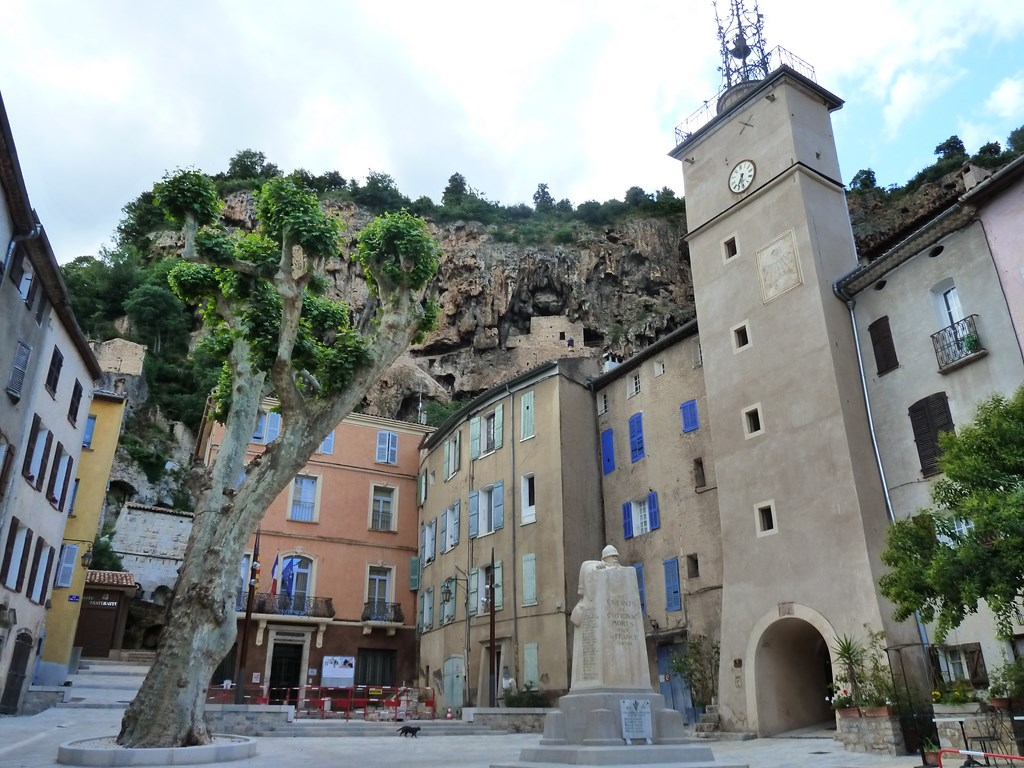
- The village square in Cotignac

- Coat of arms
- Location of Cotignac
- Location within France Location within Provence-Alpes-Côte d'Azur
- Coordinates: 43°31′47″N 6°09′00″E
- Country: France
- Region: Provence-Alpes-Côte d'Azur
- Department: Var
- Arrondissement: Brignoles
- Canton: Brignoles
- Intercommunality: CA Provence Verte

Government
  - Mayor (2020–2026): Jean-Pierre Veran
- Area^{1}: 44.26 km^{2} (17.09 sq mi)
- Elevation: 230 m (750 ft)
- Highest elevation: 712 m (2,336 ft)
- Lowest elevation: 144 m (472 ft)
- Population (2023): 2,197
  - Density: 49.64/km^{2} (128.6/sq mi)
- Demonym: Cotignacéens
- Time zone: UTC+01:00 (CET)
  - Summer (DST): UTC+02:00 (CEST)
- INSEE/Postal code: 83046 /83570
- Website: mairiecotignac.fr
- ^{1} French Land Register data, which excludes lakes, ponds, glaciers > 1 km^{2} (0.386 sq mi or 247 acres) and river estuaries.

Cotignac (French pronunciation: [kɔtiɲak]; Occitan: Cotinhac) is a commune in the Var department in the Provence-Alpes-Côte d'Azur region in southeastern France. It is a member of the association Les Plus Beaux Villages de France (The Most Beautiful Villages of France).

== Geography ==
=== Climate ===
Cotignac has a hot-summer Mediterranean climate (Köppen climate classification Csa). The average annual temperature in Cotignac is 13.1 °C (55.6 °F). The average annual rainfall is 820.6 mm (32.31 in) with October as the wettest month. The temperatures are highest on average in July, at around 22.2 °C (72.0 °F), and lowest in January, at around 5.3 °C (41.5 °F). The highest temperature ever recorded in Cotignac was 40.6 °C (105.1 °F) on 7 July 1982; the coldest temperature ever recorded was −13.4 °C (7.9 °F) on 23 January 1963.

Climate data for Cotignac (1981−2010 normals, extremes 1957−2013)
| Month | Jan | Feb | Mar | Apr | May | Jun | Jul | Aug | Sep | Oct | Nov | Dec | Year |
|---|---|---|---|---|---|---|---|---|---|---|---|---|---|
| Record high °C (°F) | 24.0 (75.2) | 23.6 (74.5) | 25.6 (78.1) | 28.6 (83.5) | 33.0 (91.4) | 38.0 (100.4) | 40.6 (105.1) | 39.4 (102.9) | 34.4 (93.9) | 31.6 (88.9) | 24.4 (75.9) | 22.2 (72.0) | 40.6 (105.1) |
| Mean daily maximum °C (°F) | 10.8 (51.4) | 11.9 (53.4) | 15.2 (59.4) | 17.7 (63.9) | 22.2 (72.0) | 26.6 (79.9) | 30.4 (86.7) | 30.2 (86.4) | 25.2 (77.4) | 19.8 (67.6) | 14.3 (57.7) | 11.2 (52.2) | 19.7 (67.5) |
| Daily mean °C (°F) | 5.3 (41.5) | 6.0 (42.8) | 8.7 (47.7) | 11.1 (52.0) | 15.3 (59.5) | 19.1 (66.4) | 22.2 (72.0) | 22.1 (71.8) | 18.1 (64.6) | 13.9 (57.0) | 9.0 (48.2) | 6.1 (43.0) | 13.1 (55.6) |
| Mean daily minimum °C (°F) | −0.1 (31.8) | 0.0 (32.0) | 2.1 (35.8) | 4.6 (40.3) | 8.3 (46.9) | 11.7 (53.1) | 14.1 (57.4) | 14.1 (57.4) | 11.0 (51.8) | 8.0 (46.4) | 3.7 (38.7) | 1.0 (33.8) | 6.6 (43.9) |
| Record low °C (°F) | −13.4 (7.9) | −12.6 (9.3) | −11.8 (10.8) | −4.8 (23.4) | −2.6 (27.3) | 3.2 (37.8) | 5.0 (41.0) | 5.0 (41.0) | 2.0 (35.6) | −4.4 (24.1) | −7.4 (18.7) | −10.0 (14.0) | −13.4 (7.9) |
| Average precipitation mm (inches) | 69.2 (2.72) | 43.6 (1.72) | 46.3 (1.82) | 82.3 (3.24) | 77.4 (3.05) | 50.1 (1.97) | 19.3 (0.76) | 48.5 (1.91) | 89.0 (3.50) | 109.1 (4.30) | 103.6 (4.08) | 82.2 (3.24) | 820.6 (32.31) |
| Average precipitation days (≥ 1.0 mm) | 6.4 | 5.2 | 5.2 | 7.7 | 6.8 | 4.9 | 2.7 | 3.7 | 5.3 | 7.4 | 6.8 | 6.7 | 68.7 |
Source: Météo-France

== Population ==
Inhabitants are known in French as Cotignacéens (masculine) and Cotignacéennes (feminine).

Historical population
| Year | Pop. | ±% p.a. |
|---|---|---|
| 1968 | 1,398 | — |
| 1975 | 1,636 | +2.27% |
| 1982 | 1,628 | −0.07% |
| 1990 | 1,792 | +1.21% |
| 1999 | 2,026 | +1.37% |
| 2007 | 2,163 | +0.82% |
| 2012 | 2,313 | +1.35% |
| 2017 | 2,163 | −1.33% |
| 2023 | 2,197 | +0.26% |
Source: INSEE

== See also ==
- Communes of the Var department
