= Forcalqueiret =

- Commune
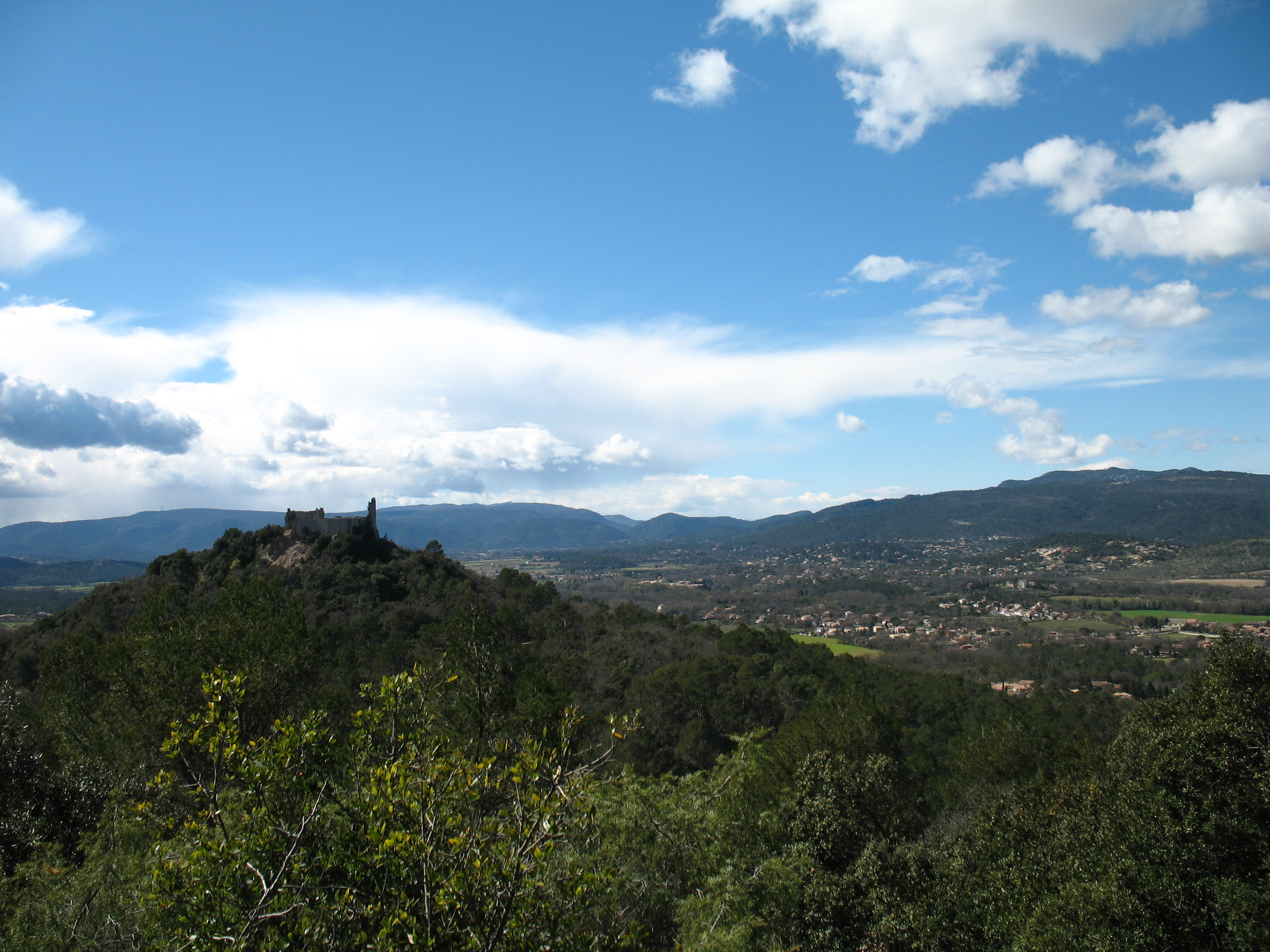
- A general view of Forcalqueiret from the west

- Coat of arms
- Location of Forcalqueiret
- Location within France Location within Provence-Alpes-Côte d'Azur
- Coordinates: 43°20′14″N 6°04′53″E
- Country: France
- Region: Provence-Alpes-Côte d'Azur
- Department: Var
- Arrondissement: Brignoles
- Canton: Garéoult
- Intercommunality: CA Provence Verte

Government
  - Mayor (2020–2026): Gilbert Bringant
- Area^{1}: 10.33 km^{2} (3.99 sq mi)
- Elevation: 296 m (971 ft)
- Highest elevation: 528 m (1,732 ft)
- Lowest elevation: 284 m (932 ft)
- Population (2023): 3,389
  - Density: 328.1/km^{2} (849.7/sq mi)
- Time zone: UTC+01:00 (CET)
  - Summer (DST): UTC+02:00 (CEST)
- INSEE/Postal code: 83059 /83136
- ^{1} French Land Register data, which excludes lakes, ponds, glaciers > 1 km^{2} (0.386 sq mi or 247 acres) and river estuaries.

Forcalqueiret (French pronunciation: [fɔʁkalkɛʁɛ]; Occitan: Forcauqueiret) is a commune in the Var department in the Provence-Alpes-Côte d'Azur region in southeastern France.

== Population ==
Historical population
| Year | Pop. | ±% p.a. |
|---|---|---|
| 1968 | 215 | — |
| 1975 | 315 | +5.61% |
| 1982 | 744 | +13.06% |
| 1990 | 1,313 | +7.36% |
| 1999 | 1,665 | +2.67% |
| 2007 | 2,083 | +2.84% |
| 2012 | 2,632 | +4.79% |
| 2017 | 2,990 | +2.58% |
| 2023 | 3,389 | +2.11% |
Source: INSEE

== See also ==
- Communes of the Var department
