= Garéoult =

- Commune
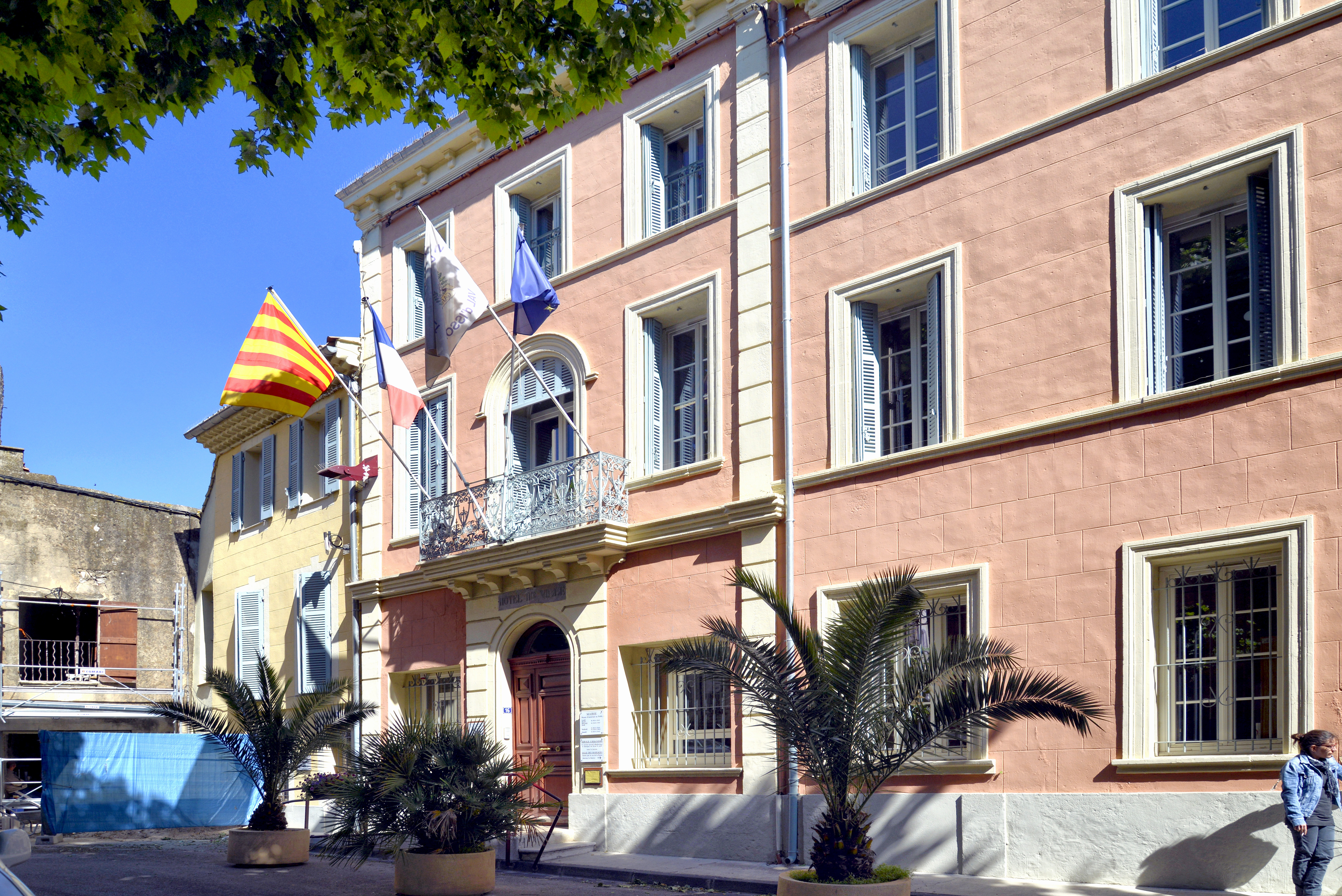
- Town hall

- Coat of arms
- Location of Garéoult
- Location within France Location within Provence-Alpes-Côte d'Azur
- Coordinates: 43°19′42″N 6°02′44″E
- Country: France
- Region: Provence-Alpes-Côte d'Azur
- Department: Var
- Arrondissement: Brignoles
- Canton: Garéoult
- Intercommunality: CA Provence Verte

Government
  - Mayor (2020–2026): Gérard Fabre
- Area^{1}: 15.75 km^{2} (6.08 sq mi)
- Elevation: 300 m (980 ft)
- Highest elevation: 659 m (2,162 ft)
- Lowest elevation: 295 m (968 ft)
- Population (2023): 5,835
  - Density: 370.5/km^{2} (959.5/sq mi)
- Time zone: UTC+01:00 (CET)
  - Summer (DST): UTC+02:00 (CEST)
- INSEE/Postal code: 83064 /83136
- ^{1} French Land Register data, which excludes lakes, ponds, glaciers > 1 km^{2} (0.386 sq mi or 247 acres) and river estuaries.

Garéoult (French pronunciation: [ɡaʁeu]; Provençal: Gareut) is a commune in the Var department in the Provence-Alpes-Côte d'Azur region in southeastern France.

== Population ==
Historical population
Year	Pop.	±% p.a.
1968	711	—
1975	1,051	+5.74%
1982	1,849	+8.40%
1990	3,432	+8.04%
1999	4,882	+3.99%
2007	5,514	+1.53%
2012	5,486	−0.10%
2017	5,330	−0.58%
2023	5,835	+1.52%
Source: INSEE

== See also ==
- Communes of the Var department
