= Camps-la-Source =

- Commune
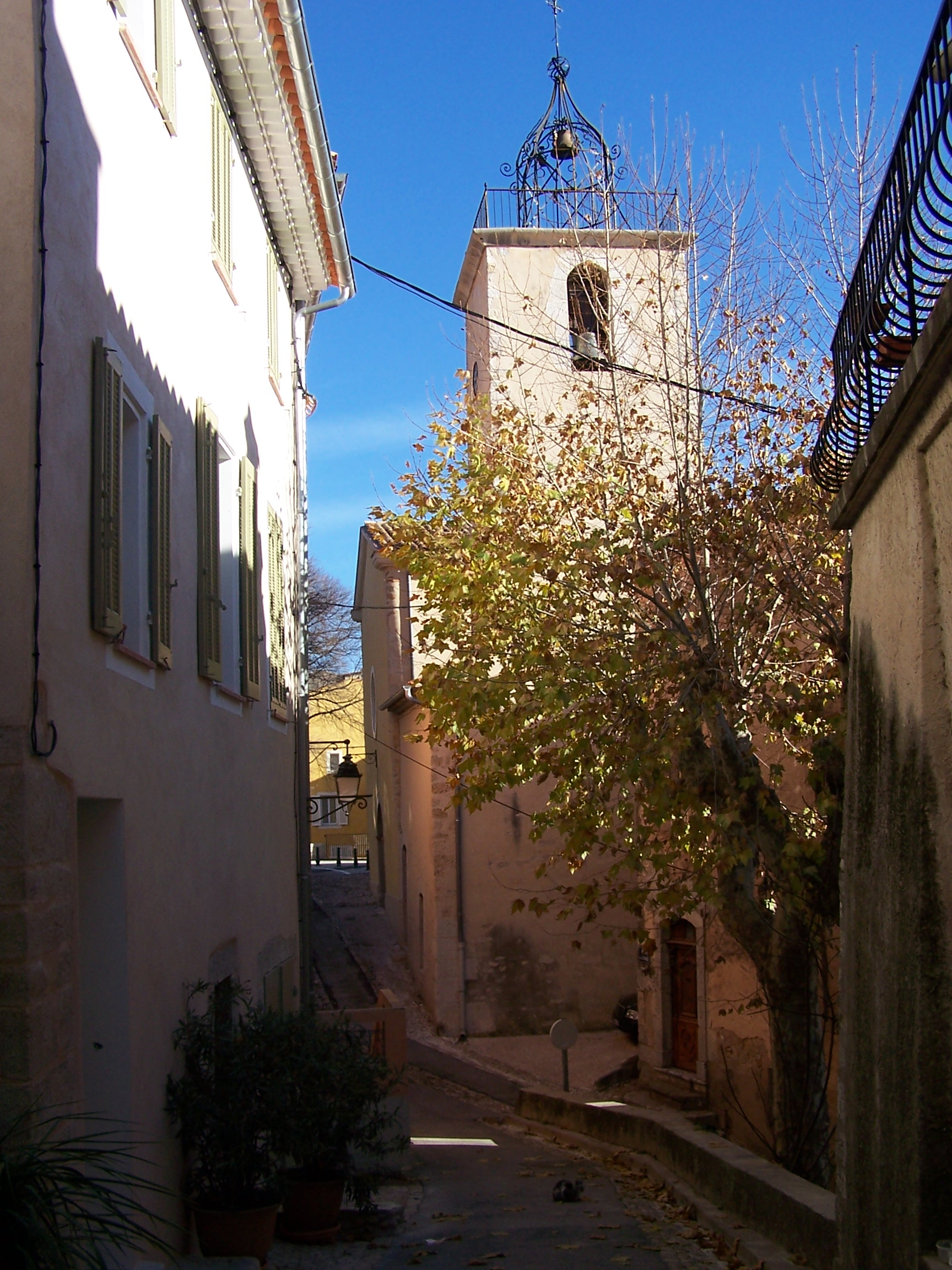
- A view within the village of Camps-la-Source

- Coat of arms
- Location of Camps-la-Source
- Location within France Location within Provence-Alpes-Côte d'Azur
- Coordinates: 43°23′11″N 6°05′40″E
- Country: France
- Region: Provence-Alpes-Côte d'Azur
- Department: Var
- Arrondissement: Brignoles
- Canton: Garéoult
- Intercommunality: CA Provence Verte

Government
  - Mayor (2020–2026): David Clercx
- Area^{1}: 22.47 km^{2} (8.68 sq mi)
- Highest elevation: 637 m (2,090 ft)
- Lowest elevation: 259 m (850 ft)
- Population (2023): 1,941
  - Density: 86.38/km^{2} (223.7/sq mi)
- Time zone: UTC+01:00 (CET)
  - Summer (DST): UTC+02:00 (CEST)
- INSEE/Postal code: 83030 /83170
- ^{1} French Land Register data, which excludes lakes, ponds, glaciers > 1 km^{2} (0.386 sq mi or 247 acres) and river estuaries.

Camps-la-Source (French pronunciation: [kɑ̃ps la suʁs]; Occitan: Camps) is a commune in the Var department in the Provence-Alpes-Côte d'Azur region in southeastern France.

== Twin towns — sister cities ==
Camps-la-Source is twinned with San Biagio della Cima, Italy (2005).

== See also ==
- Communes of the Var department
