= Château Miraval =

Chateau and vineyard in Southern France

- Location within France

General information
- Type: Château
- Architectural style: Normandy Revival
- Location: Correns, Var, Provence-Alpes-Côte d'Azur, France
- Coordinates: 43°28′26″N 6°02′10″E
- Completed: 1841
- Owner: Perrin family, Brad Pitt

Château Miraval is a château and vineyard located in the village of Correns, just north of Brignoles, a village in the Var département in the south of France. The château hit headlines in late May 2008 when it was revealed that Brad Pitt and Angelina Jolie had leased it for three years with an option to buy, after surveying prospective properties by helicopter, with the intention of having the twins they expected born in France. Pitt and Jolie exercised the buy option and were married in the château's chapel in August 2014.

== History ==
Miraval estate is located on a site first inhabited in pre-Roman times. The château, in a modest vernacular style, has thirty-five rooms. It is surrounded by gardens with a moat, fountains, ancient aqueducts, a pond and a chapel, and by its vineyard, recently planted olive grove and by the surrounding garrigue and woodlands of evergreen and white oak, and stone pine, Aleppo pine and maritime pine. A series of winding stone terraces following the profiles of the slopes are planted with thirteen varieties of olives. The immense wine cellar of Miraval was built in 1850 by Joseph-Louis Lambot, the inventor of reinforced concrete, who owned the nearby domaine of La Celle.

A previous owner, the French jazz pianist Jacques Loussier, installed a recording studio (Studio Miraval) in 1977 at the château: Sting recorded there, as did the Cranberries, and Pink Floyd laid down tracks for The Wall album, released in 1979. (Note: Previously, wine from Château Miraval was released as Pink Floyd.) In the summer of 1984 Wham! recorded their album Make It Big in the studio. Its more recent American owner, Tom Bove from Indiana, who bought the domaine in 1993 and modernised its viticulture, which had been producing simple vin de pays, has added a spa, Jacuzzi, twin gyms and an indoor pool.

In 2011, Brad Pitt and Angelina Jolie bought the domaine, as well as the wine business in 50/50 partnership with winemaker Marc Perrin. In the aftermath of her divorce from Pitt, in October 2021, Angelina Jolie sold her shares to the wine group Tenute del Mondo. Tenute del Mondo is a subsidiary of Stoli Group, known principally for Stolichnaya Vodka. Stoli group, established in 2013, is responsible for production, management and distribution of the Luxembourg-based, global spirits group, SPI.

== Products ==
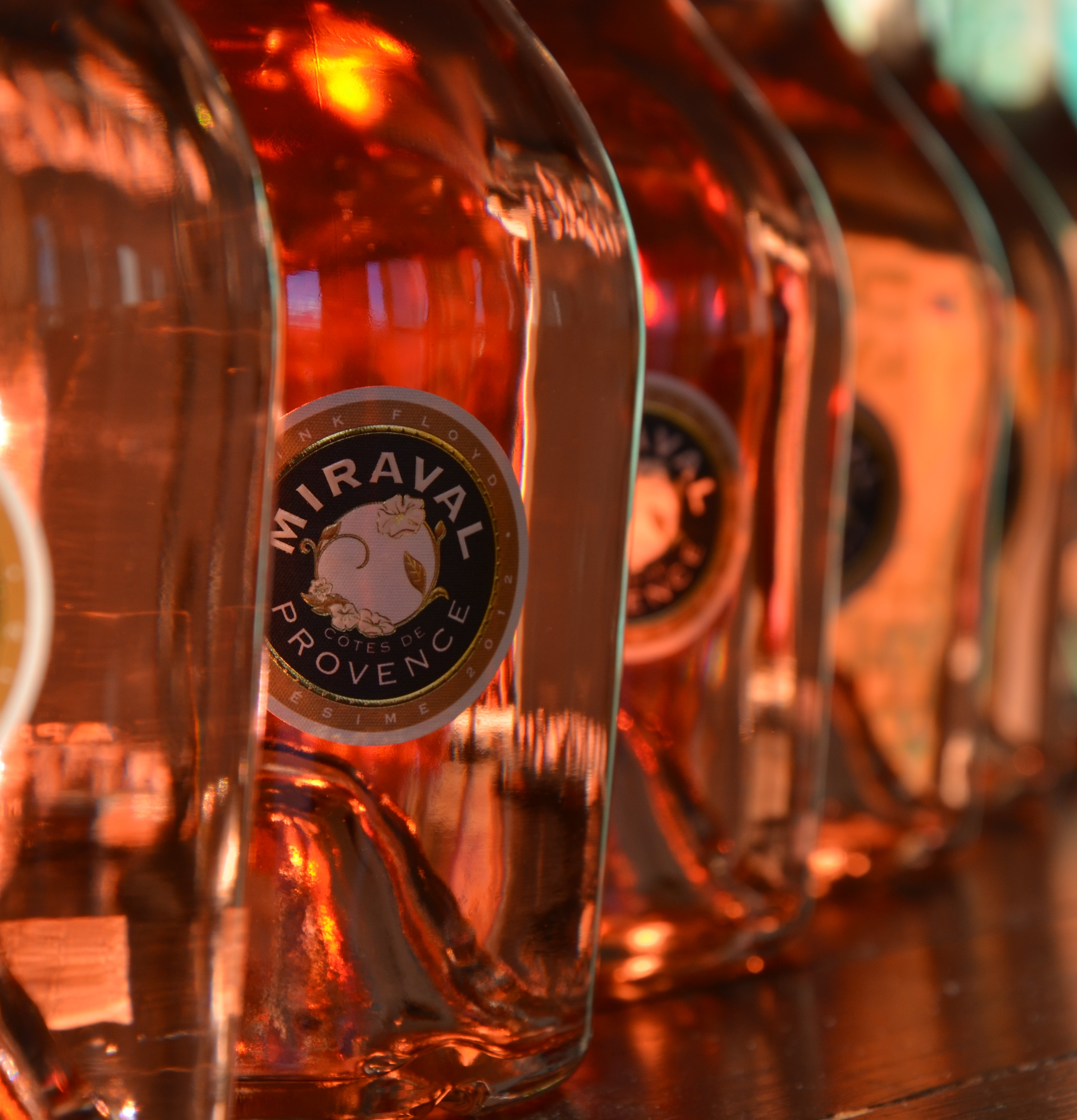
Miraval wine.

The château is known for its wines: white wines under the Coteaux Varois appellation and red, white, and rosé wine under the Côtes de Provence appellation. The Guide Hachette des Vins called it one of France's top 500 wine producers. The domaine consists of 400 hectares (990 acres) of which 30 hectares on the valley floor are devoted to organic vines (French: biologique). Correns village is the first 100% BIO.

The Côtes de Provence Rosé Miraval has won plaudits from Wine Spectator magazine.

In 2017, a new product was released, an organic extra virgin olive oil. L'Huile d'Olive Miraval is packaged in black stoneware bottles and contains blended extra virgin olive oil produced from olives grown on the Miraval estate and locally sourced Verdale, Pichouline, Tanche, Lucques, Aglandau, Cayon and Arboussane organic olives.

In January 2020, co-owner and winemaker Marc Perrin confirmed that Miraval was to release a Rosé Champagne (Fleur de Miraval) in collaboration with Champagne grower-producer Rodolphe Péters.

== See also ==
- Miraval Studios
