= Néoules =

- Commune
- Coat of arms
- Location of Néoules
- Location within France Location within Provence-Alpes-Côte d'Azur
- Coordinates: 43°18′43″N 6°00′48″E
- Country: France
- Region: Provence-Alpes-Côte d'Azur
- Department: Var
- Arrondissement: Brignoles
- Canton: Garéoult
- Intercommunality: CA Provence Verte

Government
  - Mayor (2020–2026): Christian Ryser
- Area^{1}: 25.08 km^{2} (9.68 sq mi)
- Elevation: 330 m (1,080 ft)
- Highest elevation: 700 m (2,300 ft)
- Lowest elevation: 305 m (1,001 ft)
- Population (2023): 2,976
  - Density: 118.7/km^{2} (307.3/sq mi)
- Time zone: UTC+01:00 (CET)
  - Summer (DST): UTC+02:00 (CEST)
- INSEE/Postal code: 83088 /83136
- Website: neoules.fr
- ^{1} French Land Register data, which excludes lakes, ponds, glaciers > 1 km^{2} (0.386 sq mi or 247 acres) and river estuaries.

Néoules (French pronunciation: [neul]; Occitan: Neolas) is a commune in the Var department in the Provence-Alpes-Côte d'Azur region in southeastern France.

== Population ==
Historical population
Year	Pop.	±% p.a.
1968	439	—
1975	372	−2.34%
1982	619	+7.55%
1990	1,110	+7.57%
1999	1,617	+4.27%
2007	2,419	+5.16%
2012	2,533	+0.93%
2017	2,712	+1.38%
2023	2,976	+1.56%
Source: INSEE

== See also ==
- Communes of the Var department
