= Montfort-sur-Argens =

Montfort-sur-Argens Montfòrt d'Argenç (Occitan)
- Commune
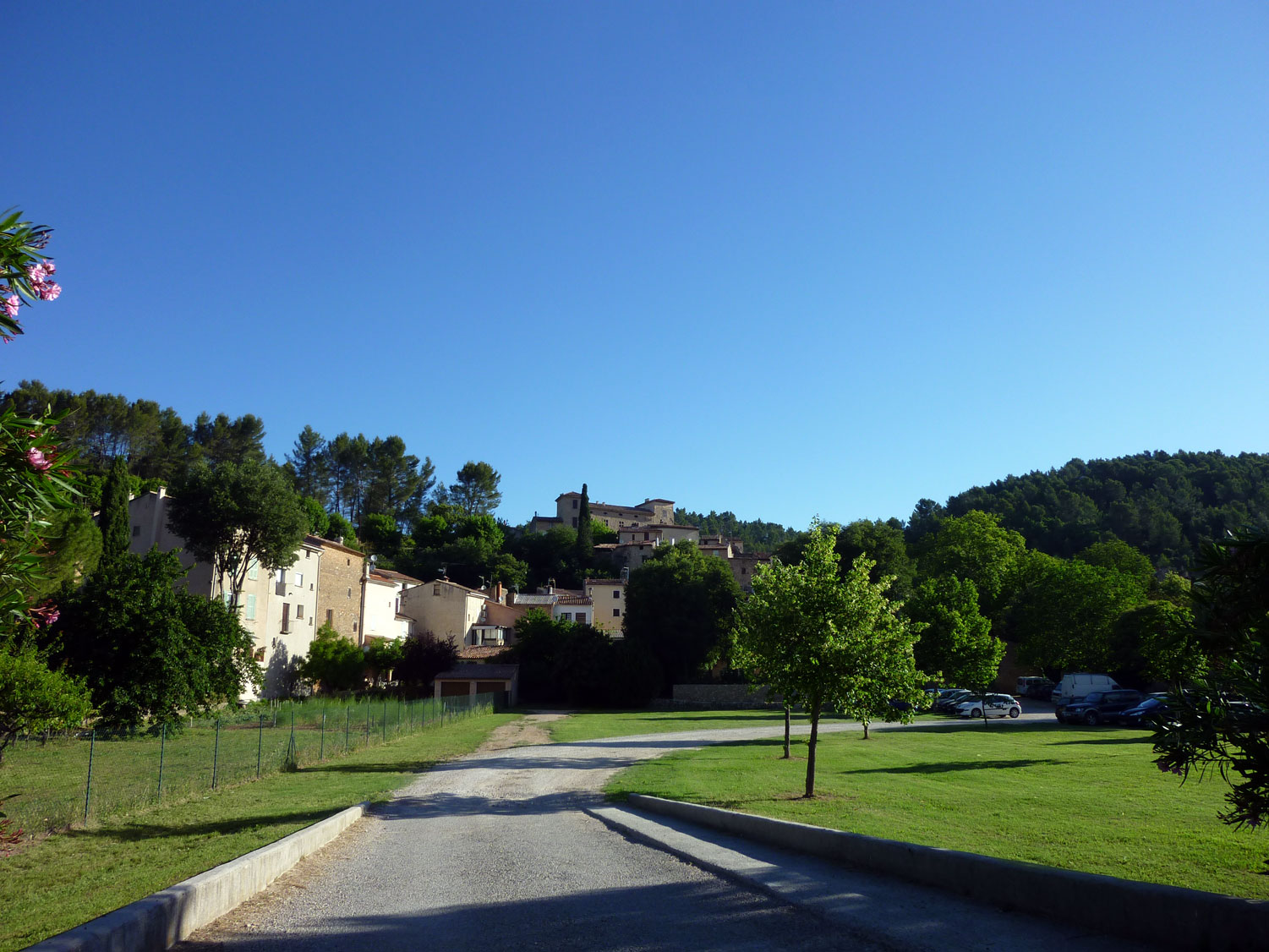
- The village seen from the church car park

- Coat of arms
- Location of Montfort-sur-Argens
- Location within France Location within Provence-Alpes-Côte d'Azur
- Coordinates: 43°28′30″N 6°07′21″E
- Country: France
- Region: Provence-Alpes-Côte d'Azur
- Department: Var
- Arrondissement: Brignoles
- Canton: Brignoles
- Intercommunality: CA Provence Verte

Government
  - Mayor (2026–32): Philippe Chuyen
- Area^{1}: 11.92 km^{2} (4.60 sq mi)
- Elevation: 110 m (360 ft)
- Highest elevation: 344 m (1,129 ft)
- Lowest elevation: 129 m (423 ft)
- Population (2023): 1,453
  - Density: 121.9/km^{2} (315.7/sq mi)
- Demonym: Montfortais
- Time zone: UTC+01:00 (CET)
  - Summer (DST): UTC+02:00 (CEST)
- INSEE/Postal code: 83083 /83570
- Website: www.montfort-sur-argens.fr
- ^{1} French Land Register data, which excludes lakes, ponds, glaciers > 1 km^{2} (0.386 sq mi or 247 acres) and river estuaries.

Montfort-sur-Argens (French pronunciation: [mɔ̃fɔʁ syʁ aʁʒɑ̃(s)]; lit. 'Montfort-on-Argens'; Occitan: Montfòrt d'Argenç) is a commune in the Var department in the Provence-Alpes-Côte d'Azur region in Southeastern France. Until 1904 it was known simply as Montfort (Occitan: Montfòrt).

== Climate ==
Montfort-sur-Argens has a hot-summer Mediterranean climate (Köppen climate classification Csa). The average annual temperature in Montfort-sur-Argens is 14.7 °C (58.5 °F). The average annual rainfall is 789.3 mm (31.07 in) with November as the wettest month. The temperatures are highest on average in July, at around 23.8 °C (74.8 °F), and lowest in January, at around 6.9 °C (44.4 °F). The highest temperature ever recorded in Montfort-sur-Argens was 42.5 °C (108.5 °F) on 28 June 2019; the coldest temperature ever recorded was −11.0 °C (12.2 °F) on 8 January 1985.

Climate data for Montfort-sur-Argens (1991−2020 normals, extremes 1980−present)
Month	Jan	Feb	Mar	Apr	May	Jun	Jul	Aug	Sep	Oct	Nov	Dec	Year
Record high °C (°F)	22.7 (72.9)	24.8 (76.6)	28.6 (83.5)	30.3 (86.5)	35.2 (95.4)	42.5 (108.5)	41.0 (105.8)	40.8 (105.4)	35.6 (96.1)	33.6 (92.5)	24.8 (76.6)	23.6 (74.5)	42.5 (108.5)
Mean daily maximum °C (°F)	12.5 (54.5)	13.9 (57.0)	17.5 (63.5)	20.3 (68.5)	24.6 (76.3)	29.0 (84.2)	32.1 (89.8)	32.0 (89.6)	26.8 (80.2)	21.7 (71.1)	16.0 (60.8)	12.7 (54.9)	21.6 (70.9)
Daily mean °C (°F)	6.9 (44.4)	7.5 (45.5)	10.5 (50.9)	13.2 (55.8)	17.3 (63.1)	21.2 (70.2)	23.8 (74.8)	23.7 (74.7)	19.3 (66.7)	15.3 (59.5)	10.6 (51.1)	7.4 (45.3)	14.7 (58.5)
Mean daily minimum °C (°F)	1.3 (34.3)	1.2 (34.2)	3.5 (38.3)	6.2 (43.2)	10.0 (50.0)	13.4 (56.1)	15.5 (59.9)	15.4 (59.7)	11.9 (53.4)	9.0 (48.2)	5.1 (41.2)	2.0 (35.6)	7.9 (46.2)
Record low °C (°F)	−11.0 (12.2)	−9.8 (14.4)	−10.6 (12.9)	−4.9 (23.2)	1.0 (33.8)	3.6 (38.5)	6.6 (43.9)	5.0 (41.0)	2.6 (36.7)	−4.0 (24.8)	−8.0 (17.6)	−9.3 (15.3)	−11.0 (12.2)
Average precipitation mm (inches)	65.3 (2.57)	45.8 (1.80)	43.2 (1.70)	68.8 (2.71)	63.6 (2.50)	51.2 (2.02)	25.4 (1.00)	31.0 (1.22)	85.6 (3.37)	114.4 (4.50)	122.7 (4.83)	72.3 (2.85)	789.3 (31.07)
Average precipitation days (≥ 1.0 mm)	5.8	5.4	5.2	6.9	6.5	4.3	2.7	3.3	5.3	7.1	8.2	6.2	66.9
Source: Météo-France

== See also ==
- Communes of the Var department
