= Méounes-lès-Montrieux =

- Commune
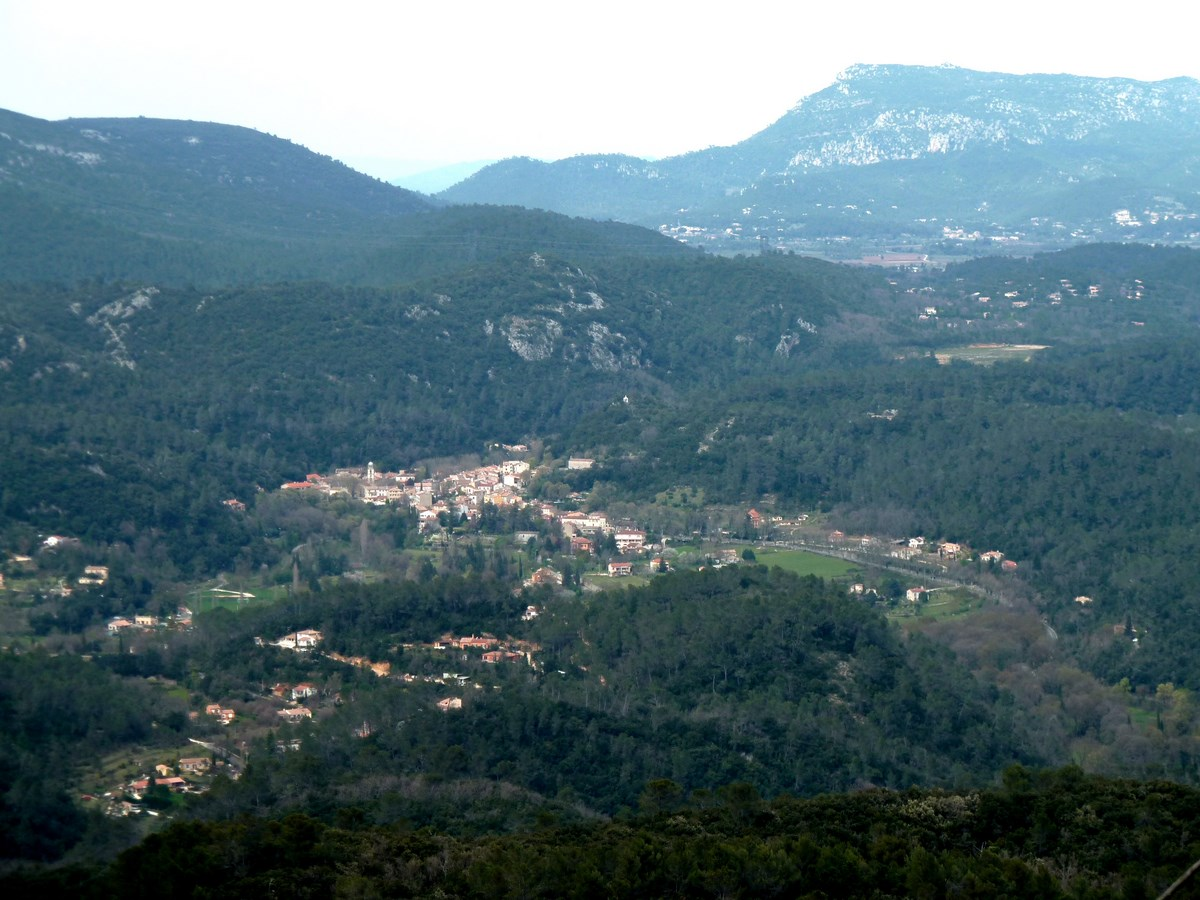
- A view of Méounes-lès-Montrieux from the nearby hillside

- Coat of arms
- Location of Méounes-lès-Montrieux
- Location within France Location within Provence-Alpes-Côte d'Azur
- Coordinates: 43°16′55″N 5°58′15″E
- Country: France
- Region: Provence-Alpes-Côte d'Azur
- Department: Var
- Arrondissement: Brignoles
- Canton: Garéoult
- Intercommunality: CA Provence Verte

Government
  - Mayor (2020–2026): Jean-Martin Guisiano
- Area^{1}: 40.92 km^{2} (15.80 sq mi)
- Elevation: 275 m (902 ft)
- Highest elevation: 784 m (2,572 ft)
- Lowest elevation: 178 m (584 ft)
- Population (2023): 2,277
  - Density: 55.65/km^{2} (144.1/sq mi)
- Time zone: UTC+01:00 (CET)
  - Summer (DST): UTC+02:00 (CEST)
- INSEE/Postal code: 83077 /83136
- ^{1} French Land Register data, which excludes lakes, ponds, glaciers > 1 km^{2} (0.386 sq mi or 247 acres) and river estuaries.

Méounes-lès-Montrieux (French pronunciation: [meun lɛ mɔ̃ʁijø]; Occitan: Meonas) is a commune in the Var department in the Provence-Alpes-Côte d'Azur region in southeastern France.

== Population ==
Historical population
Year	Pop.	±% p.a.
1968	585	—
1975	632	+1.11%
1982	928	+5.64%
1990	1,010	+1.06%
1999	1,246	+2.36%
2007	1,836	+4.96%
2012	2,051	+2.24%
2017	2,184	+1.26%
2023	2,277	+0.70%
Source: INSEE

== Places of interest ==
Charterhouse of Montrieux (from “mont rivis”, the mount of the stream), founded in 1137.

== See also ==
- Communes of the Var department
