= La Roquebrussanne =

- Commune
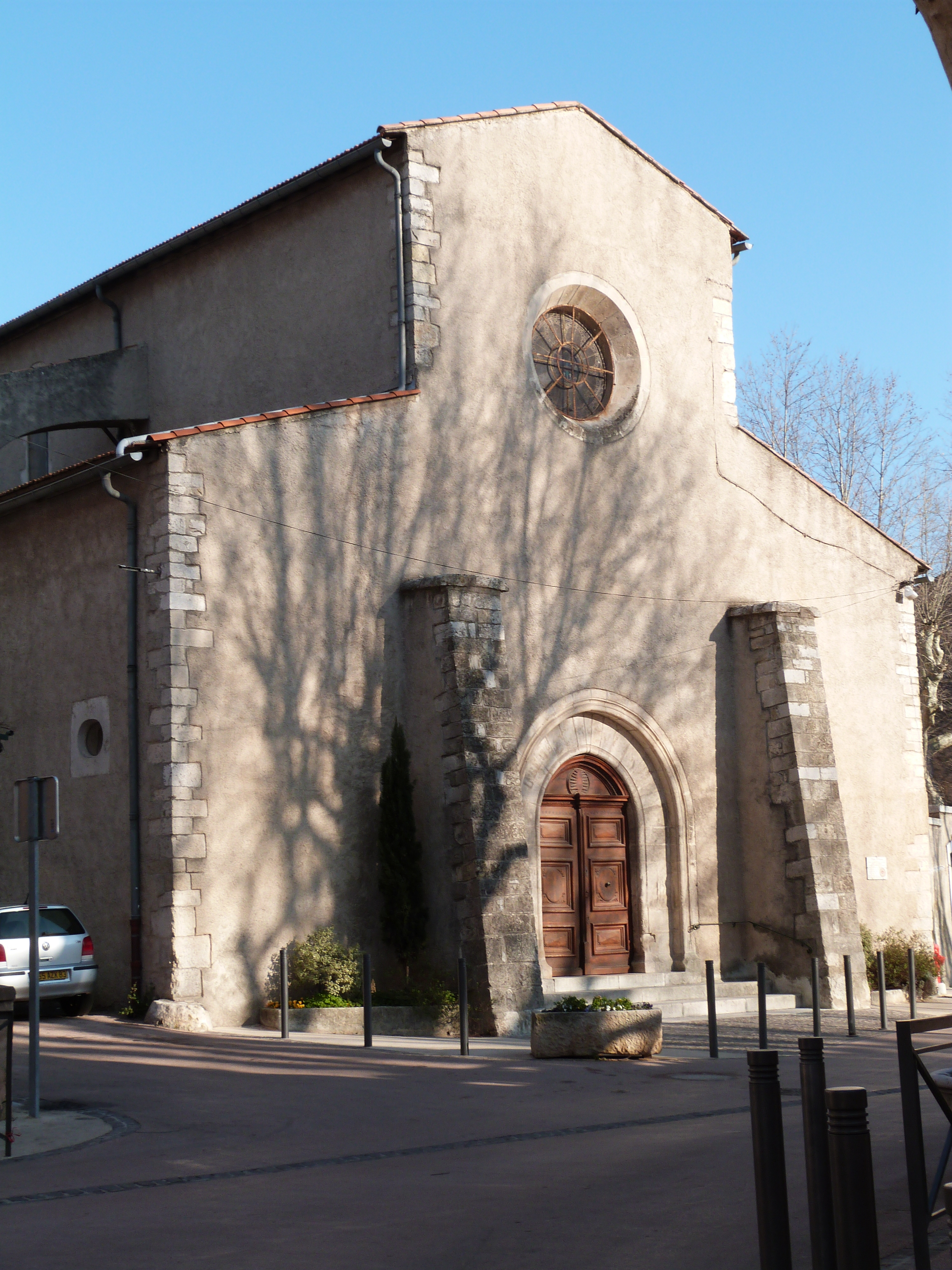
- The church of Saint-Sauveur, in La Roquebrussanne

- Coat of arms
- Location of La Roquebrussanne
- Location within France Location within Provence-Alpes-Côte d'Azur
- Coordinates: 43°20′28″N 5°58′37″E
- Country: France
- Region: Provence-Alpes-Côte d'Azur
- Department: Var
- Arrondissement: Brignoles
- Canton: Garéoult
- Intercommunality: CA Provence Verte

Government
  - Mayor (2020–2026): Michel Gros
- Area^{1}: 37.05 km^{2} (14.31 sq mi)
- Elevation: 376 m (1,234 ft)
- Highest elevation: 827 m (2,713 ft)
- Lowest elevation: 311 m (1,020 ft)
- Population (2023): 2,817
  - Density: 76.03/km^{2} (196.9/sq mi)
- Time zone: UTC+01:00 (CET)
  - Summer (DST): UTC+02:00 (CEST)
- INSEE/Postal code: 83108 /83136
- ^{1} French Land Register data, which excludes lakes, ponds, glaciers > 1 km^{2} (0.386 sq mi or 247 acres) and river estuaries.

La Roquebrussanne (French pronunciation: [la ʁɔkbʁysan]; Occitan: La Ròcabrussana) is a commune in the Var department in the Provence-Alpes-Côte d'Azur region in southeastern France. The French educator and writer Louis-François Jauffret (1770–1840) was born in the village.

== Population ==
Historical population
Year	Pop.	±% p.a.
1968	710	—
1975	662	−1.00%
1982	809	+2.91%
1990	1,235	+5.43%
1999	1,672	+3.42%
2007	2,149	+3.19%
2012	2,513	+3.18%
2017	2,455	−0.47%
2023	2,817	+2.32%
Source: INSEE

== See also ==
- Communes of the Var department
