= La Celle, Var =

La Celle
- Commune
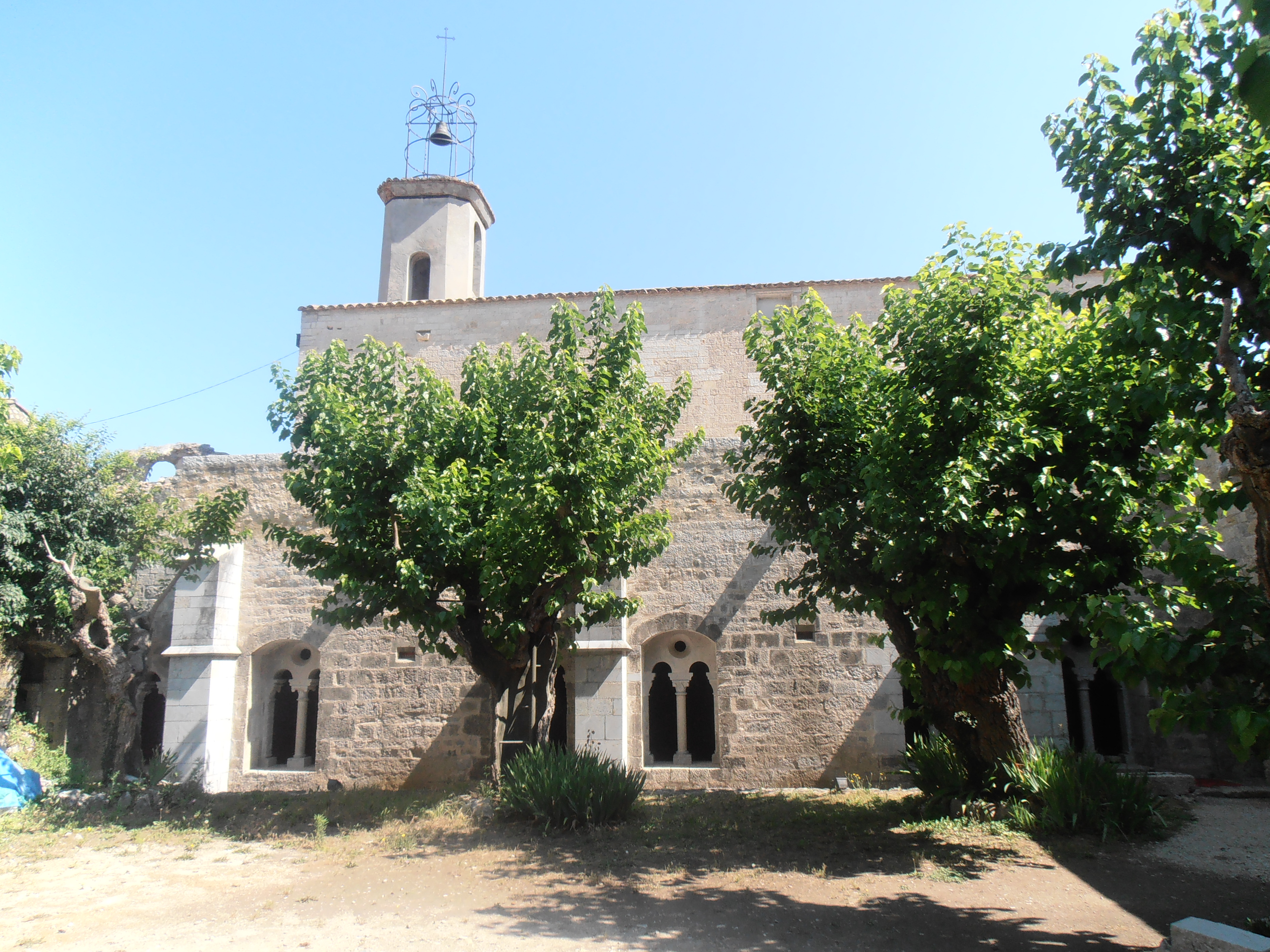
- The church of La Celle

- Coat of arms
- Location of La Celle
- Location within France Location within Provence-Alpes-Côte d'Azur
- Coordinates: 43°23′42″N 6°02′28″E
- Country: France
- Region: Provence-Alpes-Côte d'Azur
- Department: Var
- Arrondissement: Brignoles
- Canton: Brignoles
- Intercommunality: CA Provence Verte

Government
  - Mayor (2020–2026): Jacques Paul
- Area^{1}: 21 km^{2} (8.1 sq mi)
- Elevation: 227 m (745 ft)
- Highest elevation: 827 m (2,713 ft)
- Lowest elevation: 219 m (719 ft)
- Population (2023): 1,659
  - Density: 79/km^{2} (200/sq mi)
- Time zone: UTC+01:00 (CET)
  - Summer (DST): UTC+02:00 (CEST)
- INSEE/Postal code: 83037 /83170
- ^{1} French Land Register data, which excludes lakes, ponds, glaciers > 1 km^{2} (0.386 sq mi or 247 acres) and river estuaries.

La Celle (French pronunciation: [la sɛl]; Occitan: La Cèla) is a commune in the Var department in the Provence-Alpes-Côte d'Azur region in southeastern France.

== See also ==
- Communes of the Var department
