= Rougiers =

- Commune
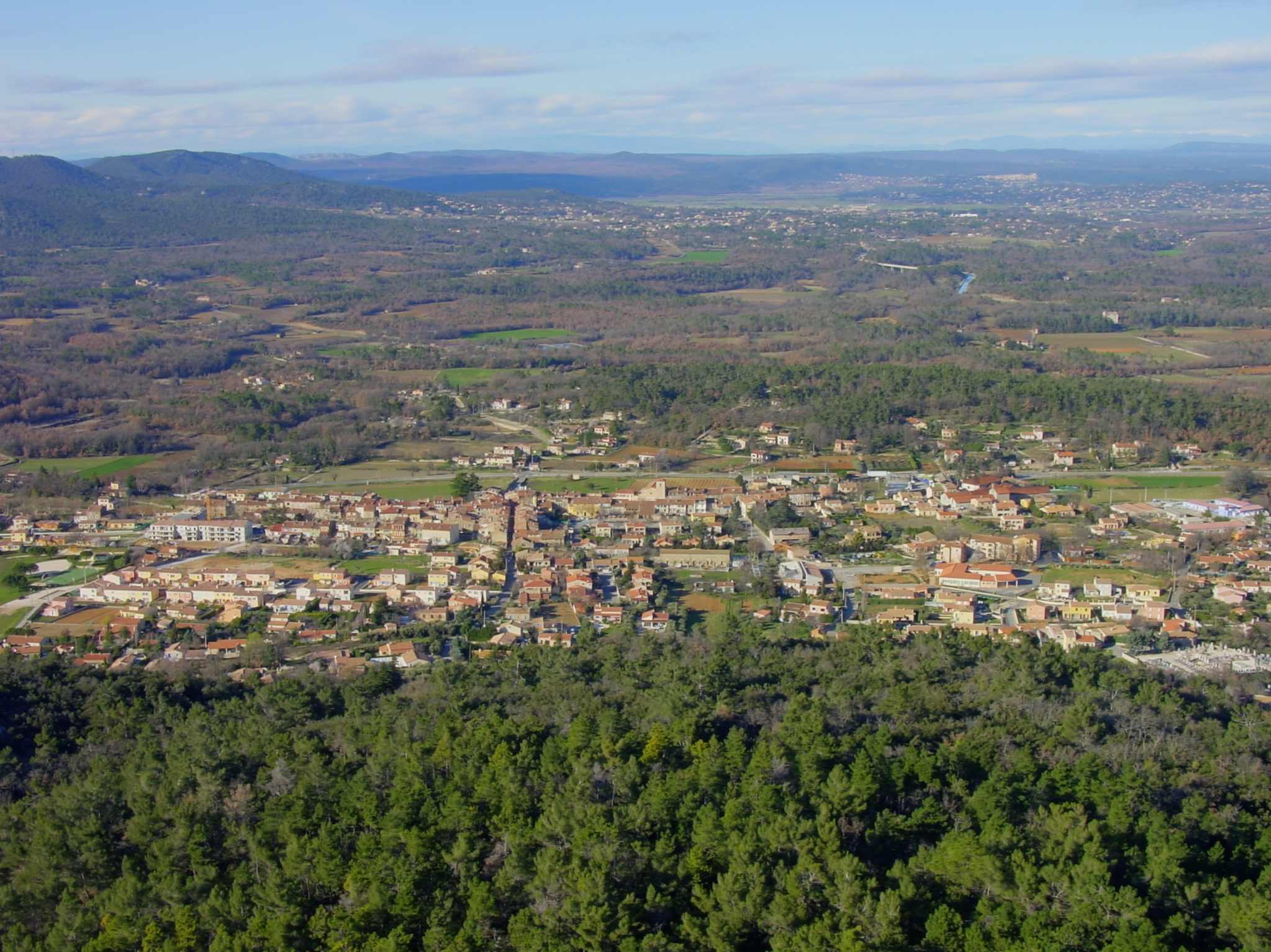
- The village seen from Castrum Saint Jean

- Coat of arms
- Location of Rougiers
- Location within France Location within Provence-Alpes-Côte d'Azur
- Coordinates: 43°23′32″N 5°51′03″E
- Country: France
- Region: Provence-Alpes-Côte d'Azur
- Department: Var
- Arrondissement: Brignoles
- Canton: Brignoles
- Intercommunality: CA Provence Verte

Government
  - Mayor (2020–2026): Patrice Tonarelli
- Area^{1}: 20.53 km^{2} (7.93 sq mi)
- Elevation: 320 m (1,050 ft)
- Highest elevation: 741 m (2,431 ft)
- Lowest elevation: 309 m (1,014 ft)
- Population (2023): 1,697
  - Density: 82.66/km^{2} (214.1/sq mi)
- Time zone: UTC+01:00 (CET)
  - Summer (DST): UTC+02:00 (CEST)
- INSEE/Postal code: 83110 /83170
- ^{1} French Land Register data, which excludes lakes, ponds, glaciers > 1 km^{2} (0.386 sq mi or 247 acres) and river estuaries.

Rougiers (French pronunciation: [ʁuʒje]; Occitan: Rotgiers) is a commune in the Var department in the Provence-Alpes-Côte d'Azur region in southeastern France.

It was the site of influential medieval excavations by the French archaeologist Gabrielle Démians d'Archimbaud.

== See also ==
- Communes of the Var department
