= Tourves =

- Commune
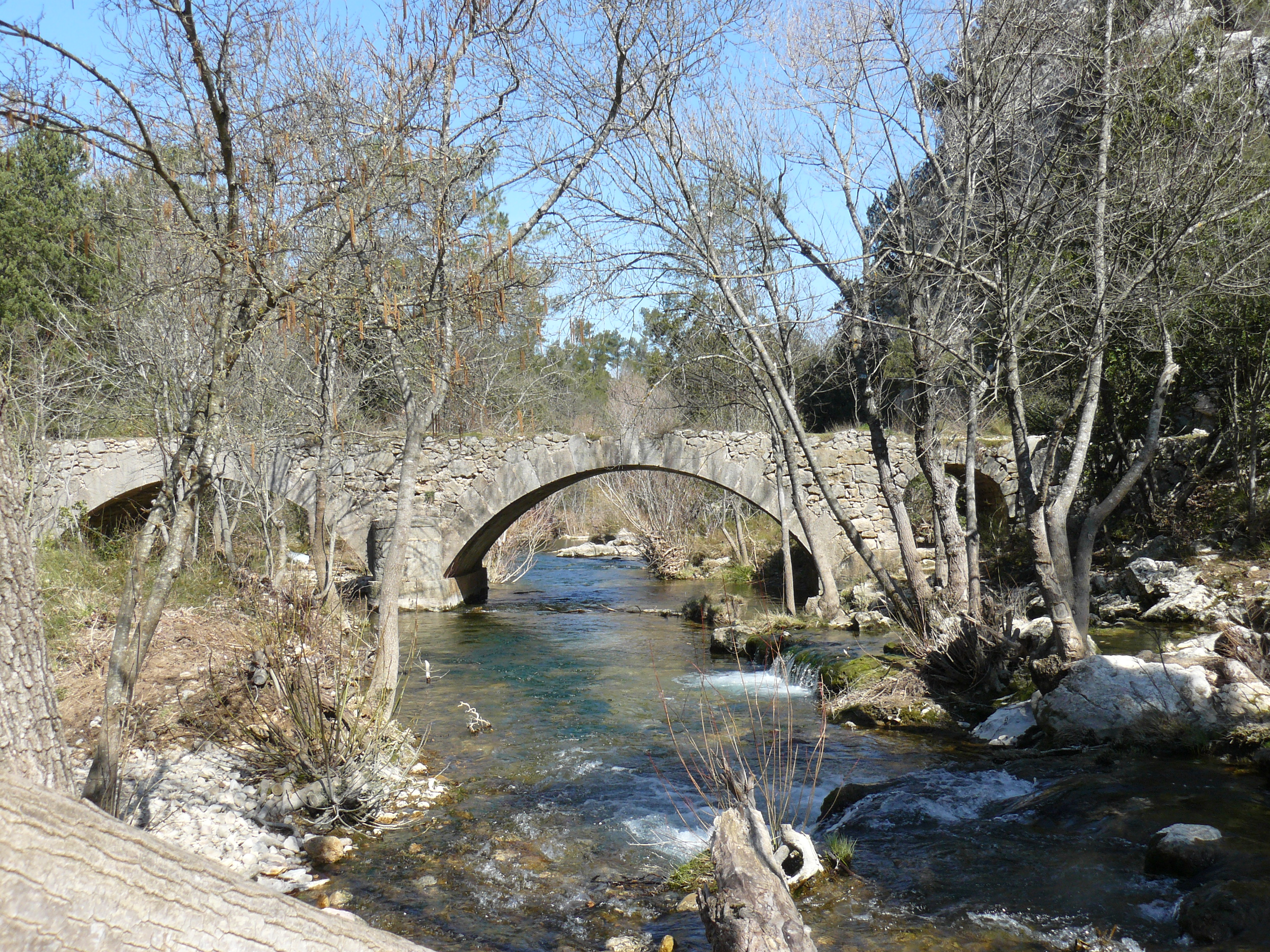
- The Roman bridge in Tourves

- Coat of arms
- Location of Tourves
- Location within France Location within Provence-Alpes-Côte d'Azur
- Coordinates: 43°24′32″N 5°55′29″E
- Country: France
- Region: Provence-Alpes-Côte d'Azur
- Department: Var
- Arrondissement: Brignoles
- Canton: Brignoles
- Intercommunality: CA Provence Verte

Government
  - Mayor (2020–2026): Jean-Michel Constans
- Area^{1}: 65.62 km^{2} (25.34 sq mi)
- Elevation: 296 m (971 ft)
- Highest elevation: 542 m (1,778 ft)
- Lowest elevation: 238 m (781 ft)
- Population (2023): 5,207
  - Density: 79.35/km^{2} (205.5/sq mi)
- Time zone: UTC+01:00 (CET)
  - Summer (DST): UTC+02:00 (CEST)
- INSEE/Postal code: 83140 /83170
- ^{1} French Land Register data, which excludes lakes, ponds, glaciers > 1 km^{2} (0.386 sq mi or 247 acres) and river estuaries.

Tourves (French pronunciation: [tuʁv]; Occitan: Torvas) is a commune in the Var department in the Provence-Alpes-Côte d'Azur region in southeastern France.

== Population ==
Historical population
Year	Pop.	±% p.a.
1968	1,648	—
1975	1,844	+1.62%
1982	2,137	+2.13%
1990	2,788	+3.38%
1999	3,428	+2.32%
2007	4,774	+4.23%
2012	4,963	+0.78%
2017	5,025	+0.25%
2023	5,207	+0.59%
Source: INSEE

== Twin towns — sister cities ==
Tourves is twinned with:

- Perinaldo, Italy (1993)

== See also ==
- Communes of the Var department
