= Cantons of the Var department =

The following is a list of the 23 cantons of the Var department, in France, following the French canton reorganisation which came into effect in March 2015:

- Brignoles
- La Crau
- Draguignan
- Flayosc
- Fréjus
- La Garde
- Garéoult
- Hyères
- Le Luc
- Ollioules
- Roquebrune-sur-Argens
- Saint-Cyr-sur-Mer
- Sainte-Maxime
- Saint-Maximin-la-Sainte-Baume
- Saint-Raphaël
- La Seyne-sur-Mer-1
- La Seyne-sur-Mer-2
- Solliès-Pont
- Toulon-1
- Toulon-2
- Toulon-3
- Toulon-4
- Vidauban
