= Departmental Council of Var =

Departmental legislature in France

Departmental Council of Var Conseil départemental du Var
- Logo of the Council
- Established: 4 March 1790

Leadership
- President: Jean-Louis Masson, LR since 26 October 2022

Elections
- First election: 3 July 1848
- Last election: 1 July 2021

Meeting place
- Toulon

Website
- www.var.fr/home

The Departmental Council of Var (French: Conseil départemental du Var) is the deliberative assembly of the French department of Var. The departmental council, currently chaired by Jean-Louis Masson of The Republicans and composed of 46 departmental councillors, elected in 23 cantons, sits in Toulon.

== History ==
The Var departmental council was founded on March 4, 1790, following the creation of the French departments by decree of December 22, 1789 taken by the Constituent Assembly to replace the provinces of France. In 1985, Maurice Arreckx, deputy mayor of Toulon, was elected president of the General Council of Var, thus ending the presidency of the socialist Édouard Soldani (nearly 30 years).

== Composition ==
Political map of the cantons of Var (2021)

Composition (by party)
Party	Acronym	Seats
Majority (44 seats)
The Republicans	LR	28
Miscellaneous right	DVD	14
Miscellaneous centre	DVC	2
Opposition (2 seats)
National Rally	RN	2

=== Vice-Presidents ===
Order	Name	Party	Canton of election
1st	Jean Louis Masson	LR	La Garde
2nd	Nathalie Bicais	LR	La Seyne-sur-Mer-2
3rd	Louis Reynier	LR	Flayosc
4th	Laetitia Quilici	LR	Ollioules
5th	Didier Brémond	DVD	Brignoles
6th	Andree Samat	LR	Saint-Cyr-sur-Mer
7th	Yannick Chenevard	LR	Toulon-4
8th	Manon Fortias	LR	Toulon-3
9th	Thierry Albertini	LR	Toulon-3
10th	Patricia Arnould	DVD	La Crau
11th	Bruno Aycard	LR	Solliès-Pont
12th	Christine Niccoletti	DVC	Draguignan
13th	Dominique Lain	DVD	Le Luc
