= List of senators of Var =

Location of Var in France

The following is a list of people who have represented the department of Var in the Senate of France.

== Third Republic ==
Senators for Var under the French Third Republic were:

- Charles Brun (1876–1889)
- Jean-Baptiste Ferrouillat (1876–1891)
- Augustin Daumas (1889–1891)
- Edmond Magnier (1891–1895)
- Eugène Angles (1891–1897)
- Étienne Bayol (1896–1900)
- Victor Méric (1898–1909)
- Louis Sigallas (1900–1909)
- Georges Clemenceau (1902–1920)
- Victor Reymonenq (1909–1919)
- Louis Martin, (1909–1936)
- Gustave Fourment (1920–1940)
- René Renoult (1920–1940)
- Henry Senes (1936–1940)

== Fourth Republic ==
Senators for Var under the French Fourth Republic were:

- Édouard Soldani (1946–1959)
- Toussaint Merle, (1946–1948)
- Albert Lamarque (1948–1958)
- Gabriel Escudier, (1958)

== Fifth Republic ==
Senators for Var under the French Fifth Republic:

== Sénateurs actuels ==
Period	Name	Group or party	Notes
1959–1977	Clément Balestra	Socialiste	
1959–1972	Édouard Le Bellegou	Socialiste	Died in office 5 December 1972
1959–1986	Édouard Soldani	Socialiste	
1972–1977	Auguste Amic	Socialiste	Replaced Edouard Le Bellegou on 6 December 1972
1977–1978	Pierre Gaudin	Socialiste	Died in office 2 January 1978
1977–1978	Jean-Jacques Perron	Socialiste	Died in office 5 October 1978
1978–1986	Maurice Janetti	Socialiste	Replaced Pierre Gaudin on 3 January 1978; Elected deputy, left Senate on 2 April 1986
1978–1981	Guy Durbec	Socialiste	Replaced Jean-Jacques Perron on 6 October 1978; Elected deputy, left Senate on 21 June 1981
1981–1986	Geneviève Le Bellegou-Béguin	Socialiste	Replaced Guy Durbec on 27 September 1981
1986–1995	Maurice Arreckx	Républicains et Indépendants	
1986–2004	René-Georges Laurin	Union pour un Mouvement Populaire	
1986–2014	François Trucy	Union pour un Mouvement Populaire	
1995–2002	Hubert Falco	Les Républicains	Joined cabinet 17 July 2002
2002–2004	André Geoffroy	Union pour un Mouvement Populaire	Replaced Hubert Falco on 18 July 2002
2004–2017	Christiane Hummel	Les Républicains	Resigned 22 September 2017
2004–2008	Hubert Falco	Les Républicains	Joined cabinet 18 April 2008
2008–2010	Élie Brun	Union pour un Mouvement Populaire	Replaced Hubert Falco 19 April 2008
2010–2017	Hubert Falco	Les Républicains	Returned to senate 14 December 2010; Resigned 21 September 2017
2014–2017	David Rachline	none	Resigned 30 September 2017
From 2014	Pierre-Yves Collombat	Socialist Party (PS)	
From 2017	Georges Ginesta	The Republicans) (LR)	Replaced Hubert Falco on 22 September 2017
From 2017	Claudine Kauffmann	National Front (FN)	Replaced David Rachline on 1 October 2017
From 2017	Christine Lanfranchi-Dorgal	The Republicans (LR)	Replaced Christiane Hummel on 23 September 2017

== Sources ==
- Liste des anciens sénateurs de la IIIème République par circonscription (in French), Sénat de France
- Liste des anciens sénateurs de la IVème République par circonscription (in French), Sénat de France
- Liste des anciens sénateurs de la Vème République par circonscription (in French), Sénat de France
- Liste par département - Var (in French), Sénat de France
