= Var's 5th constituency =

Constituency of the National Assembly of France

5th constituency of Var
- inline Constituency of the National Assembly of France

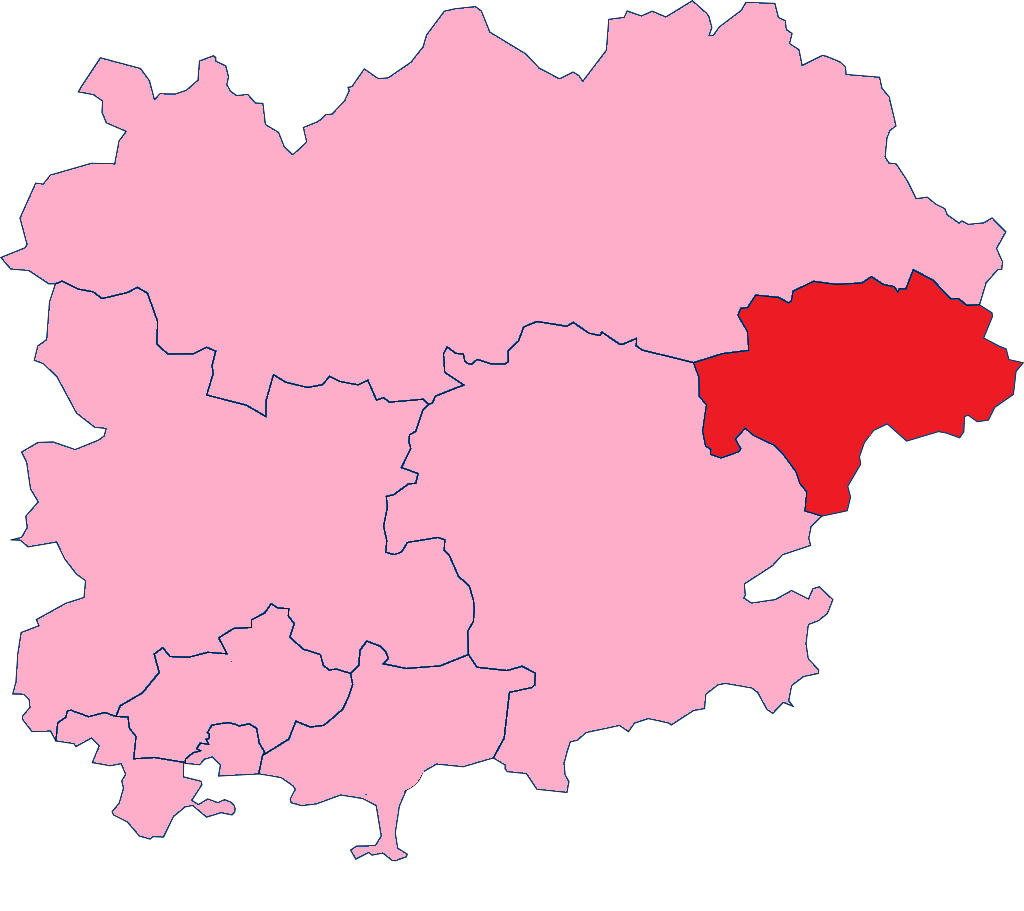
- Var's 5th Constituency shown within the Var
- Deputy: Julie Lechanteux; RN
- Department: Var
- Cantons: Fréjus, Le Muy, Saint-Raphaël
- Registered voters: 96,236

The 5th constituency of the Var (French: Cinquième circonscription du Var) is a French legislative constituency in the Var département. Like the other 576 French constituencies, it elects one MP using the two-round system, with a run-off if no candidate receives over 50% of the vote in the first round.

== Description ==
The 4th constituency of the Var lies in the east of the department around the historic town of Fréjus and the neighbouring town of Saint-Raphaël.

The constituency has traditionally supported centre right candidates, however in the 2017 election the mainstream conservative The Republicans candidate came third in the first round behind both the Emmanuel Macron backed MoDems and the far right National Front.

== Assembly Members ==
Election	Member	Party
1988	François Léotard	UDF
1993	François Léotard	UDF
1997	François Léotard	UDF
2002	Georges Ginesta	UMP
2007	Georges Ginesta	UMP
2012	Georges Ginesta	UMP
2017	Philippe Michel-Kleisbauer	MoDem
2022	Julie Lechanteux	RN

== Election results ==
=== 2024 ===
Legislative Election 2024: Var's 5th constituency
Party	Candidate	Votes	%	±%
LR	Danièle Lombard	5,304	7.92	+1.53
MoDem (Ensemble)	Philippe Michel-Kleisbauer	14,890	22.23	−5.05
LO	Rémi Kranzer	342	0.51	n/a
ÉAC	Hélène Charlotte de Busschère	2,058	3.07	+0.07
LFI (NFP)	Aurelien Lacour	8,450	12.62	+0.53
REC	Vincent Thiery	1,429	2.13	−8.62
RN	Julie Lechanteux	34,496	51.51	15.41
Turnout		66,969	98.04	+52.67
Registered electors		102,351		
RN hold				

=== 2022 ===
Legislative Election 2022: Var's 5th constituency
Party	Candidate	Votes	%	±%
RN	Julie Lechanteux	16,350	36.10	+10.55
MoDem (Ensemble)	Philippe Michel-Kleisbauer	12,355	27.28	-1.30
LFI (NUPÉS)	Robert Caraguel	5,477	12.09	+1.18
REC	Baptiste Laroche	4,868	10.75	N/A
LR (UDC)	Jean-Marc Maurin	2,894	6.39	−13.04
DVE	Charles Malot	1,359	3.00	N/A
Others	N/A	1,991	4.40	N/A
Turnout		45,294	45.37	−0.13
2nd round result
RN	Julie Lechanteux	24,342	55.98	+9.22
MoDem (Ensemble)	Philippe Michel-Kleisbauer	19,142	44.02	−9.22
Turnout		43,484	44.89	+5.73
RN gain from MoDem				

=== 2017 ===
Legislative Election 2017: Var's 5th constituency
Party	Candidate	Votes	%	±%
MoDem	Philippe Michel-Kleisbauer	12,513	28.58	
FN	Gilles Longo	11,188	25.55	
LR	Guillaume Decard	8,509	19.43	
LFI	Catherine Aubry	2,736	6.25	
DVD	Jonathan Dery	1,758	4.01	
DIV	Luc Laine	1,405	3.21	
DVG	Jean-Pierre Meynet	1,227	2.80	
EELV	Jacky Giral	880	2.01	
Others	N/A	3,573		
Turnout		43,789	45.50	
2nd round result
MoDem	Philippe Michel-Kleisbauer	20,061	53.24	
FN	Gilles Longo	17,622	46.76	
Turnout		37,683	39.16	
MoDem gain from LR				

=== 2012 ===
Legislative Election 2012: Var's 5th constituency
Party	Candidate	Votes	%	±%
UMP	Georges Ginesta	21,209	40.87	
FN	David Rachline	13,261	25.56	
PS	Martine Bouvard	10,938	21.08	
MoDem	Philippe Michel	3,362	6.48	
FG	Marie-Dominique Fievre	1,494	2.88	
Others	N/A	1,624		
Turnout		51,888	57.00	
2nd round result
UMP	Georges Ginesta	24,955	59.64	
FN	David Rachline	16,888	40.36	
Turnout		41,843	45.97	
UMP hold				

=== 2007 ===
Legislative Election 2007: Var's 5th constituency
Party	Candidate	Votes	%	±%
UMP	Georges Ginesta	35,906	57.17	
PS	Elsa Di Meo	10,391	16.55	
MoDem	Philippe Michel	5,228	8.32	
FN	Sylvain Ferrua	4,955	7.89	
Others	N/A	6,323		
Turnout		63,710	58.87	
UMP hold				

=== 2002 ===
Legislative Election 2002: Var's 5th constituency
Party	Candidate	Votes	%	±%
UMP	Georges Ginesta	26,694	46.90	
FN	Evelyne Pierron	12,891	22.65	
LV	Philippe Jan	9,294	16.33	
PCF	Bernard Barbagelata	1,721	3.02	
CPNT	Marie-Helene Ruiz	1,236	2.17	
Others	N/A	5,086		
Turnout		58,187	61.12	
2nd round result
UMP	Georges Ginesta	32,442	70.58	
FN	Evelyne Pierron	13,520	29.42	
Turnout		51,305	53.90	
UMP hold				

=== 1997 ===
Legislative Election 1997: Var's 5th constituency
Party	Candidate	Votes	%	±%
UDF	François Léotard	18,533	35.21	
FN	Jean-Pierre Risgalla	14,095	26.78	
PS	Monique Prot	10,313	19.59	
PCF	Bernard Barbagelata	3,183	6.05	
GE	Bruno Spetz	2,742	5.21	
DVD	Philippe Martinez de Campos	2,168	4.12	
Others	N/A	1,599		
Turnout		54,702	63.92	
2nd round result
UDF	François Léotard	30,200	62.71	
FN	Jean-Pierre Risgalla	17,956	37.29	
Turnout		56,066	65.51	
UDF hold				
