= Julie Lechanteux =

French politician (born 1977)

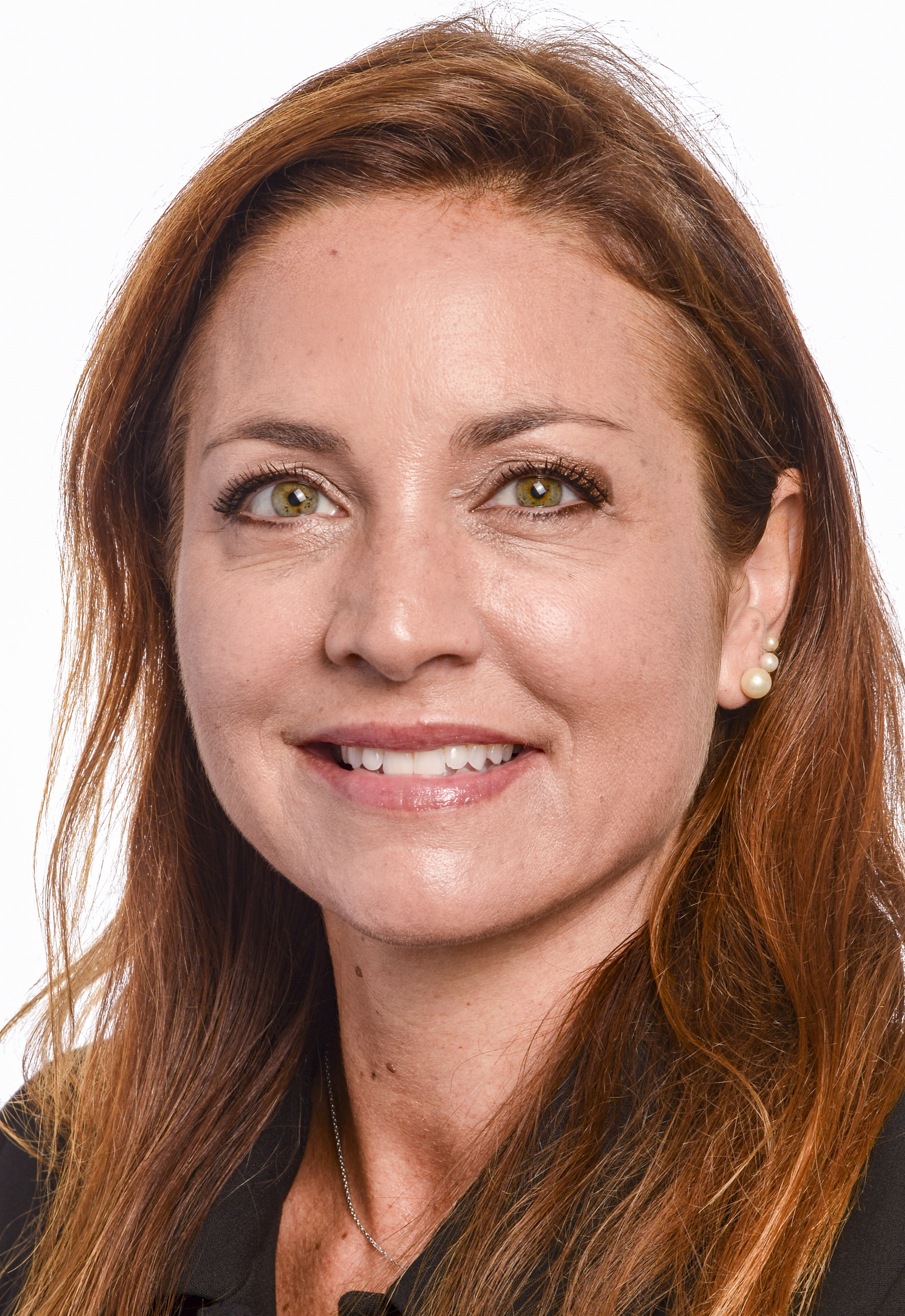

Member of the National Assembly for Var's 5th constituency
- Incumbent
- Assumed office 22 June 2022
- Preceded by: Philippe Michel-Kleisbauer

Member of the European Parliament
- In office 2 July 2019 – 28 July 2022
- Constituency: France

Personal details
- Born: 22 December 1977 (age 48) Annecy, France
- Party: National Rally (2013–present)

Julie Lechanteux (French pronunciation: [ʒyli ləʃɑ̃tø]; born 22 December 1977) is a French politician who has represented the 5th constituency of the Var department in the National Assembly since 2022. A member of the National Rally (RN), she previously served as a Member of the European Parliament (MEP) from 2019 until 2022.

== Biography ==
Julie Lechanteux was born on 22 December 1977 in Annecy. She is the daughter of a hairdresser and a perfumery saleswoman; she moved with her family to Saint-Raphaël at age 8. She joined the National Rally, then called the National Front, in 2013.

On 5 April 2014, she became Deputy Mayor of Fréjus under Mayor David Rachline following the 2014 municipal election, a position she retained until 2 July 2019, when she became an MEP. Lechanteux also held a seat in the Departmental Council of Var from 2 April 2015 to 1 July 2021 for the canton of Fréjus following the 2015 departmental election.

In the 2022 legislative election, she was elected to the National Assembly in the 5th constituency of Var, which includes Fréjus on the Mediterranean coast. She resigned as an MEP on 28 July 2022; she was succeeded by Patricia Chagnon the day after.
