= Cascade de Sillans =

Waterfall in Provence-Alpes-Côte d'Azur, France

Coordinates: 43.5642°N 6.1844°E

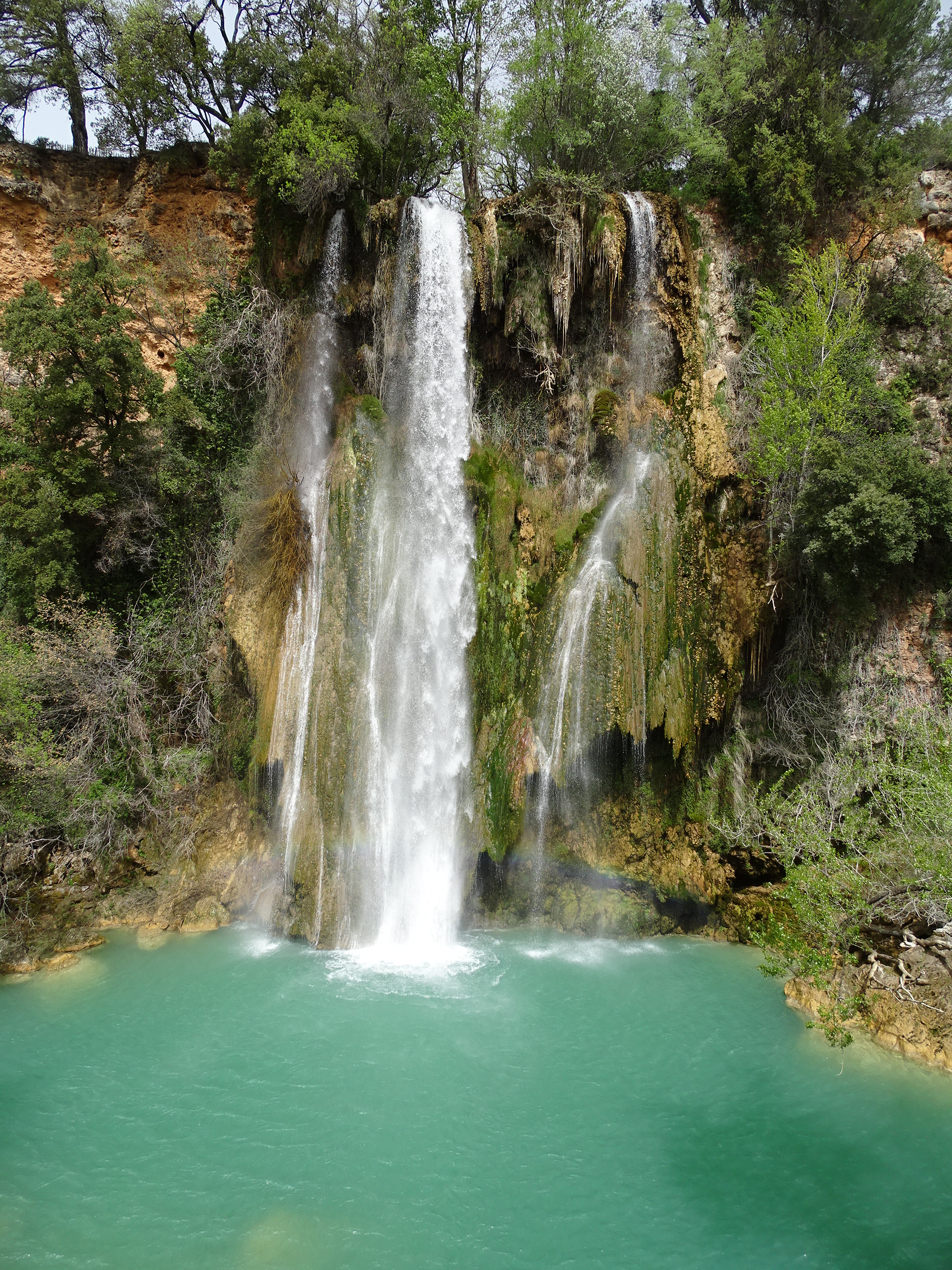
View of the Cascade de Sillans

The Cascade de Sillans (English: Waterfall of Sillans) is a waterfall in Sillans-la-Cascade, Var, Provence-Alpes-Côte d'Azur, France. Located to the southeast of the town centre, the river Bresque plunges down over 44 metres (48 yards) creating a scenic waterfall. It is mentioned as one of the most beautiful waterfalls in France and is one of the major tourist natural attractions in the Var department; the grounds are property of the Departmental Council of Var.
