= La Crau =

- Commune
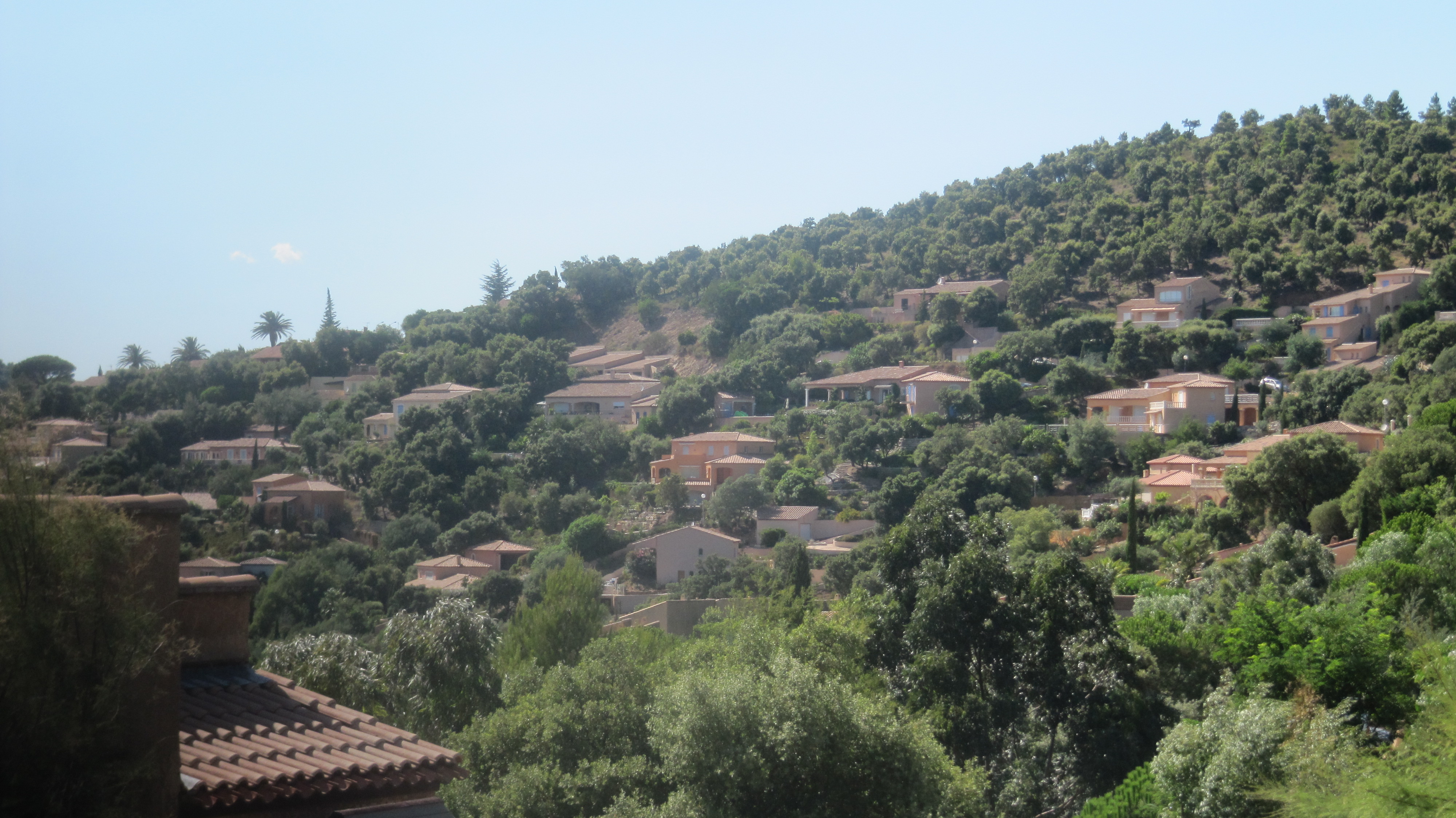
- A general view of the village

- Coat of arms
- Location of La Crau
- Location within France Location within Provence-Alpes-Côte d'Azur
- Coordinates: 43°09′02″N 6°04′29″E
- Country: France
- Region: Provence-Alpes-Côte d'Azur
- Department: Var
- Arrondissement: Toulon
- Canton: La Crau
- Intercommunality: Métropole Toulon Provence Méditerranée

Government
  - Mayor (2020–2026): Christian Simon
- Area^{1}: 37.87 km^{2} (14.62 sq mi)
- Elevation: 36 m (118 ft)
- Highest elevation: 270 m (890 ft)
- Lowest elevation: 15 m (49 ft)
- Population (2023): 19,556
  - Density: 516.4/km^{2} (1,337/sq mi)
- Time zone: UTC+01:00 (CET)
  - Summer (DST): UTC+02:00 (CEST)
- INSEE/Postal code: 83047 /83260
- ^{1} French Land Register data, which excludes lakes, ponds, glaciers > 1 km^{2} (0.386 sq mi or 247 acres) and river estuaries.

La Crau (French pronunciation: [la kʁo]; Occitan: La Crau d'Ieras) is a commune in the Var department in the Provence-Alpes-Côte d'Azur region in southeastern France.

== Population ==
Historical population
Year	Pop.	±% p.a.
1968	5,308	—
1975	5,772	+1.20%
1982	8,877	+6.34%
1990	11,257	+3.01%
1999	14,509	+2.86%
2007	16,152	+1.35%
2012	16,592	+0.54%
2017	18,288	+1.97%
2023	19,556	+1.12%
Source: INSEE

== Twin towns ==
La Crau is twinned with:

- Villeneuve, Vaud, Switzerland, since 1987
- Rosà, Italy, since 2006
- (Germany) Schallstadt, since 2018

== See also ==
- Communes of the Var department
