= Le Revest-les-Eaux =

- Commune
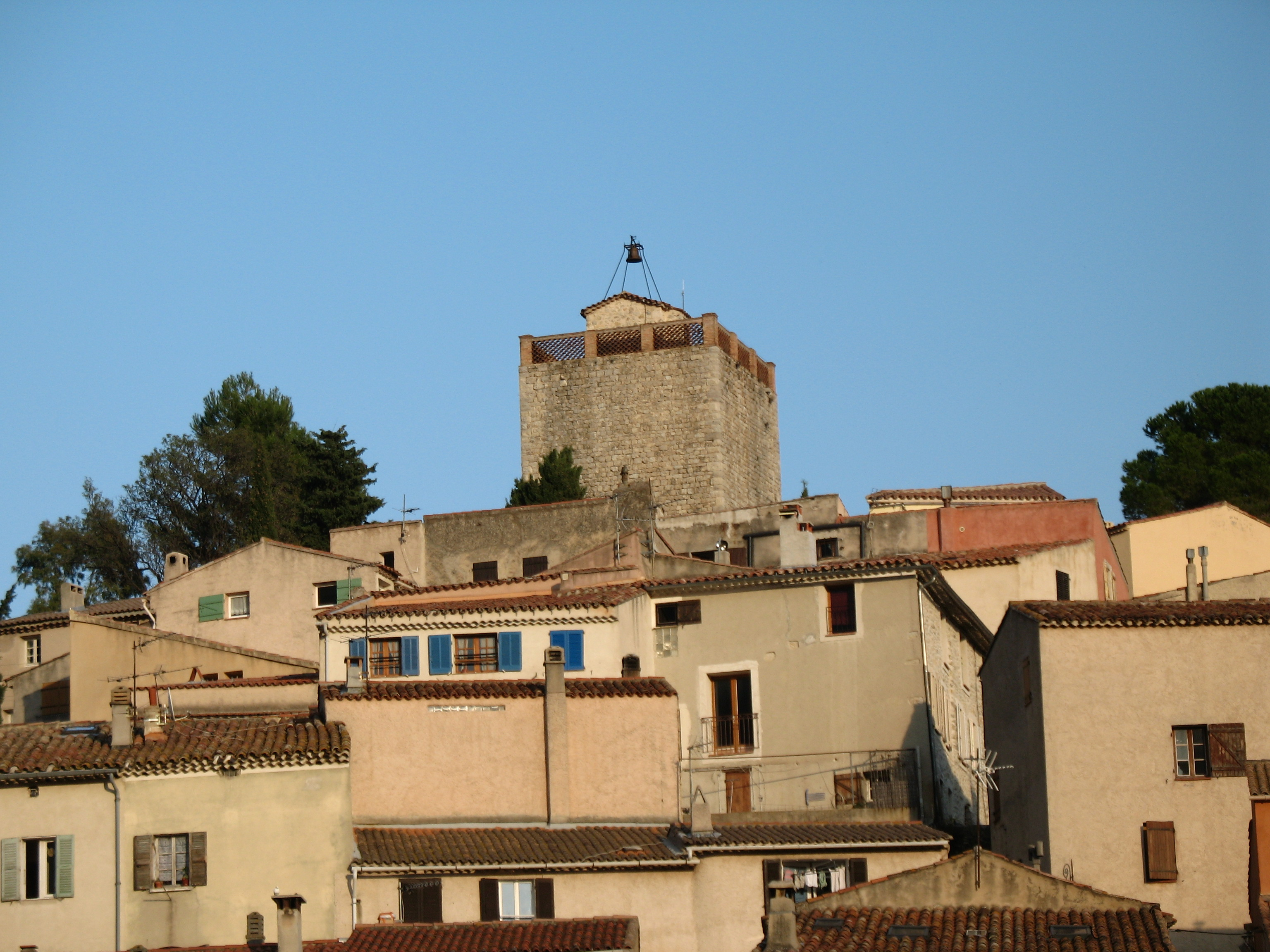
- The village tower of Le Revest-les-Eaux

- Coat of arms
- Location of Le Revest-les-Eaux
- Location within France Location within Provence-Alpes-Côte d'Azur
- Coordinates: 43°10′38″N 5°55′38″E
- Country: France
- Region: Provence-Alpes-Côte d'Azur
- Department: Var
- Arrondissement: Toulon
- Canton: Toulon-3
- Intercommunality: Métropole Toulon Provence Méditerranée

Government
  - Mayor (2020–2026): Ange Musso
- Area^{1}: 24.07 km^{2} (9.29 sq mi)
- Elevation: 190 m (620 ft)
- Highest elevation: 804 m (2,638 ft)
- Lowest elevation: 50 m (160 ft)
- Population (2023): 4,074
  - Density: 169.3/km^{2} (438.4/sq mi)
- Time zone: UTC+01:00 (CET)
  - Summer (DST): UTC+02:00 (CEST)
- INSEE/Postal code: 83103 /83760
- ^{1} French Land Register data, which excludes lakes, ponds, glaciers > 1 km^{2} (0.386 sq mi or 247 acres) and river estuaries.

Le Revest-les-Eaux (French pronunciation: [lə ʁəvɛst le.z‿o]; Occitan: Lo Revèst leis Aigas) is a commune in the Var department in the Provence-Alpes-Côte d'Azur region in southeastern France.

== Population ==
Historical population
Year	Pop.	±% p.a.
1968	1,659	—
1975	1,688	+0.25%
1982	2,055	+2.85%
1990	2,704	+3.49%
1999	3,441	+2.71%
2007	3,697	+0.90%
2012	3,616	−0.44%
2017	3,865	+1.34%
2023	4,074	+0.88%
Source: INSEE

== See also ==
- Communes of the Var department
