= Saint-Mandrier-sur-Mer =

Saint-Mandrier-sur-Mer Sant Mandrier de Mar (Occitan)
- Commune
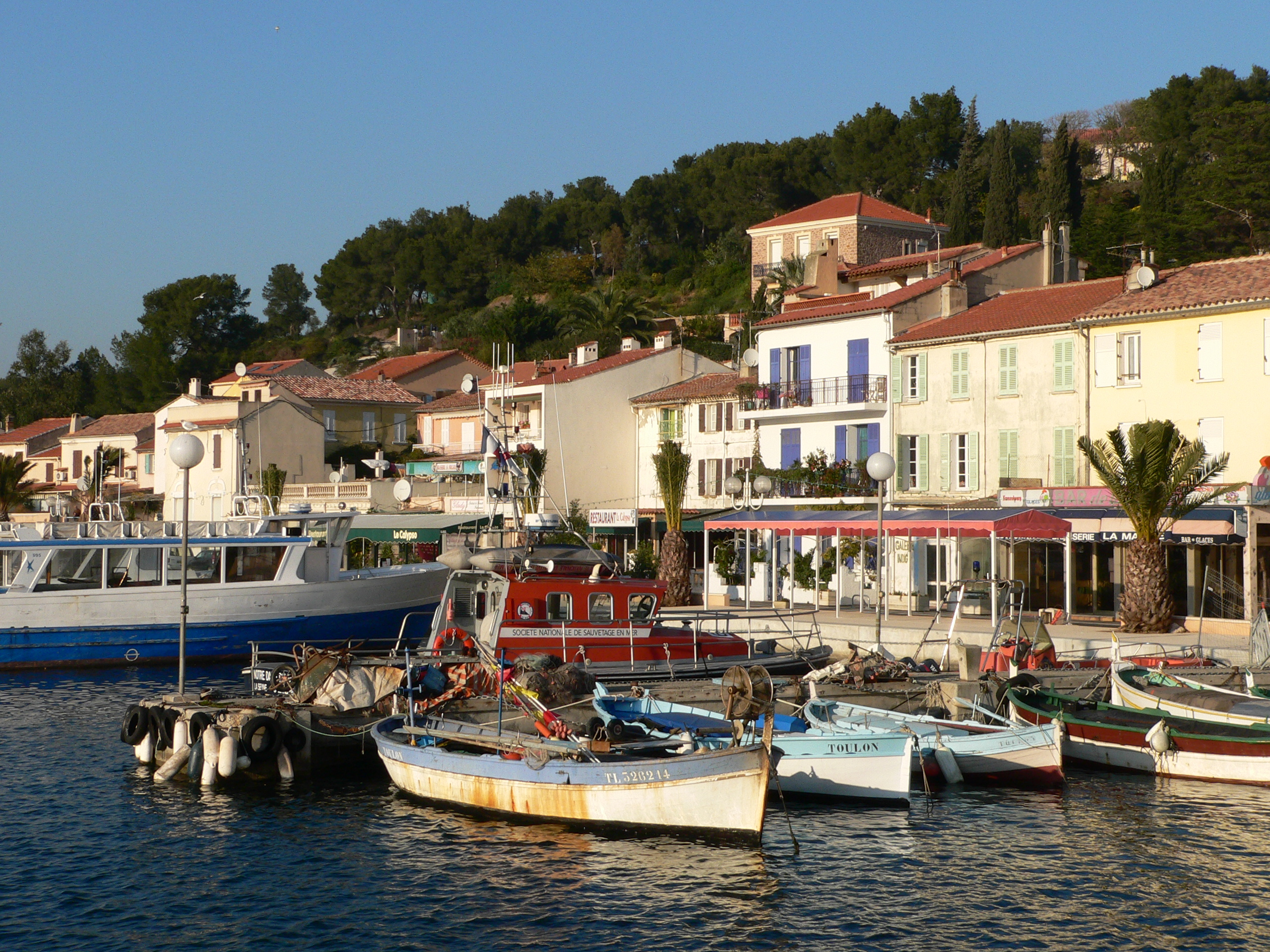
- A view of the harbour with the SNSM rescue boat and fishermen's boats

- Coat of arms
- Location of Saint-Mandrier-sur-Mer
- Location within France Location within Provence-Alpes-Côte d'Azur
- Coordinates: 43°05′00″N 5°56′00″E
- Country: France
- Region: Provence-Alpes-Côte d'Azur
- Department: Var
- Arrondissement: Toulon
- Canton: La Seyne-sur-Mer-2
- Intercommunality: Métropole Toulon Provence Méditerranée

Government
  - Mayor (2020–2026): Gilles Vincent (LR)
- Area^{1}: 5.12 km^{2} (1.98 sq mi)
- Highest elevation: 124 m (407 ft)
- Lowest elevation: 0 m (0 ft)
- Population (2023): 6,000
  - Density: 1,200/km^{2} (3,000/sq mi)
- Time zone: UTC+01:00 (CET)
  - Summer (DST): UTC+02:00 (CEST)
- INSEE/Postal code: 83153 /83430
- ^{1} French Land Register data, which excludes lakes, ponds, glaciers > 1 km^{2} (0.386 sq mi or 247 acres) and river estuaries.

Saint-Mandrier-sur-Mer (French pronunciation: [sɛ̃ mɑ̃dʁije syʁ mɛʁ], lit. "Saint-Mandrier on Sea"; Occitan: Sant Mandrier de Mar), commonly referred to simply as Saint-Mandrier (former official name), is a commune in the southeastern French department of Var, Provence-Alpes-Côte d'Azur region. Across the harbour from the military port of Toulon, first naval base in Europe by size and homeport of the aircraft carrier Charles de Gaulle, flagship of the French Navy, Saint-Mandrier-sur-Mer is home to a fishing port of its own, tucked into a small inlet.

== History ==
Situated on the Isle de Sépet until a causeway was constructed between 1630 and 1657, what is now the town shows evidence of long habitation. A Phoenician tower once stood on the island, while the area was cleared for farming in the 6th century. The Phoenician tower was converted to a Christian chapel in 566 and the church of Saint-Honorat was built in 1020.

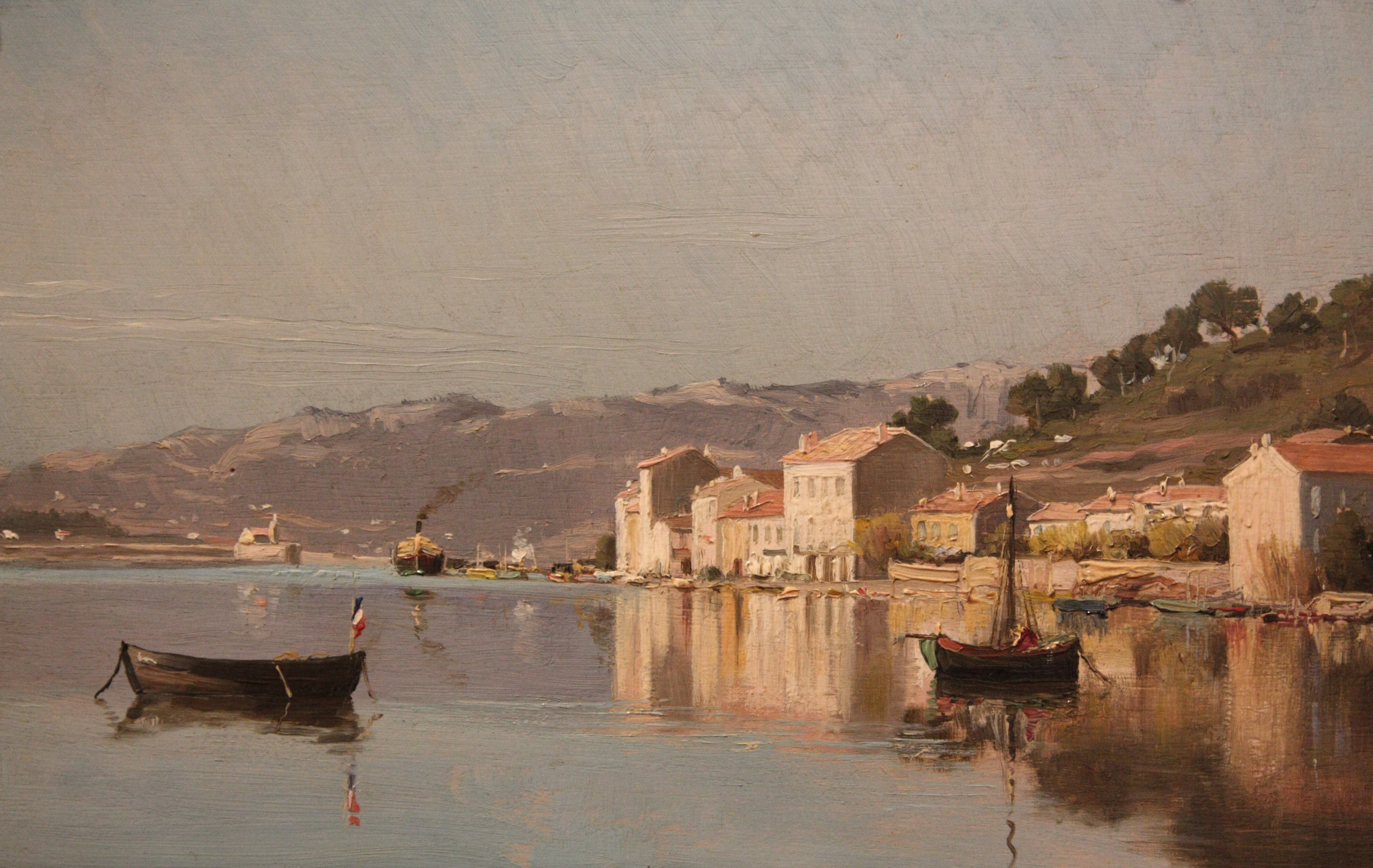
Saint-Mandrier-sur-Mer as painted by Gustave Fayet in 1890

The causeway to the mainland (the Isthme des Sablettes) not only led to the creation of an independent town, but the use of the area as a battery station for the heavily fortified port of Toulon. Fishing and naval work dominated the town, with the construction of the "Infirmerie Royale Saint-Louis" naval hospital, becoming the "Hôpital Maritime Saint-Mandrier" in 1818. In the 19th century, Saint-Mandrier-sur-Mer also was home to sailmaking. Naval aviation and the Fleet Mechanics and Pilots School (École des Mécaniciens et Chauffeurs de la flotte, GEM) were located in the town in the 1930s.

In World War II, Saint-Mandrier-sur-Mer was fortified with two turrets, each mounting a pair of 340mm naval guns taken the French battleship Provence. This fortress controlled the approaches to Toulon; the range and power of these guns was such that a considerable Allied naval force was required to destroy them. Part of the fleet and the first to engage the battery was the Free French battleship Lorraine, sister ship to the Provence and mounting the same type of gun. The Allies, who termed the battery 'Big Willie', dedicated a battleship or heavy cruiser to shelling it every day; eventually USS Nevada silenced the guns on 23 August 1944, although the fortress would not be taken until 28th.

In 1948, the World War I cemetery in Saint-Mandrier-sur-Mer was made a national necropolis. In 1961, it received the remains of an additional 975 Italian soldiers killed in World War II while fighting for the Allies. The cemetery also features the necropolis of Admiral Louis-René Levassor de Latouche Tréville, who served as commander of the naval forces in the Mediterranean under Napoleon.

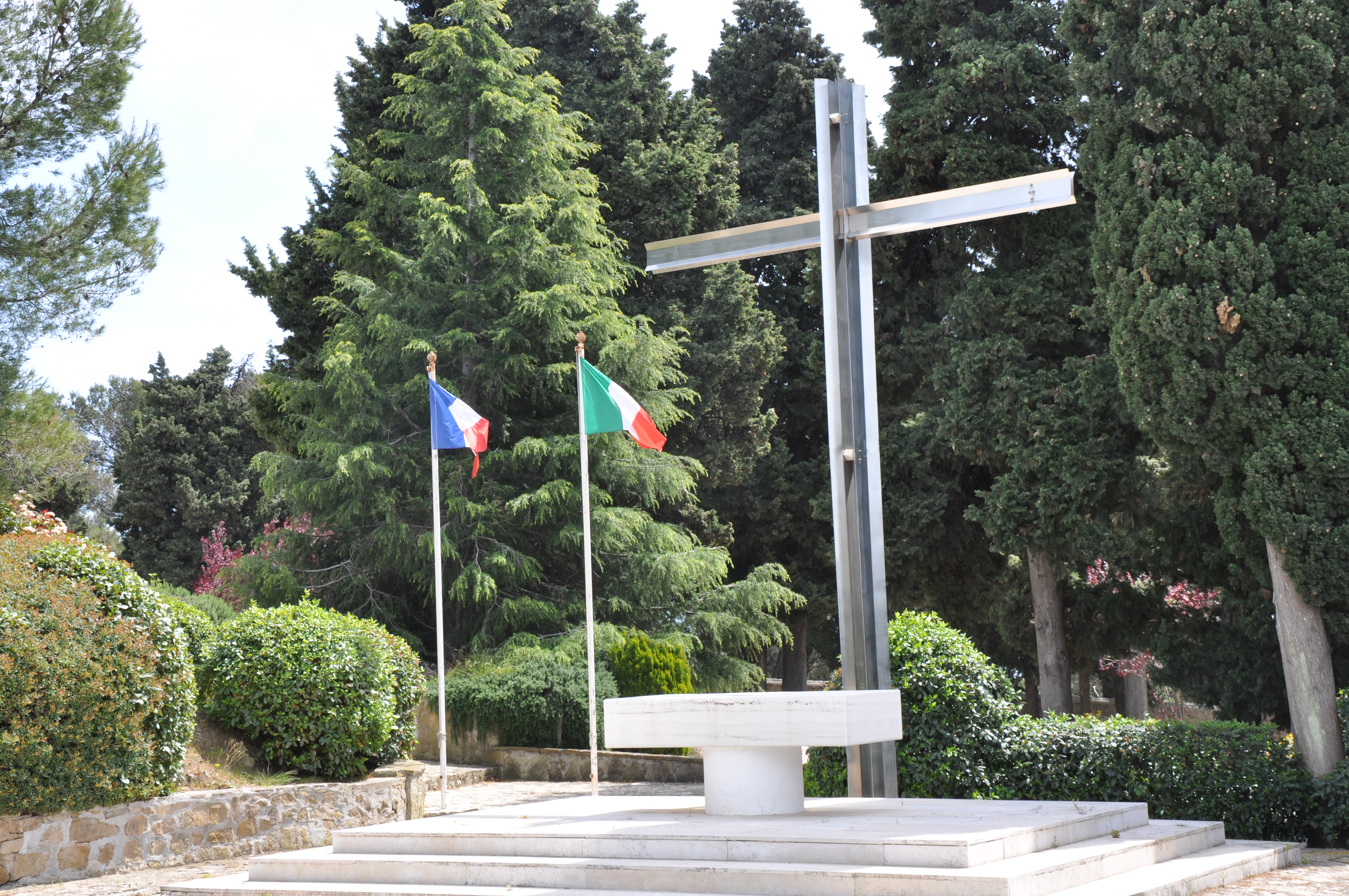
French and Italian flags at the war cemetery

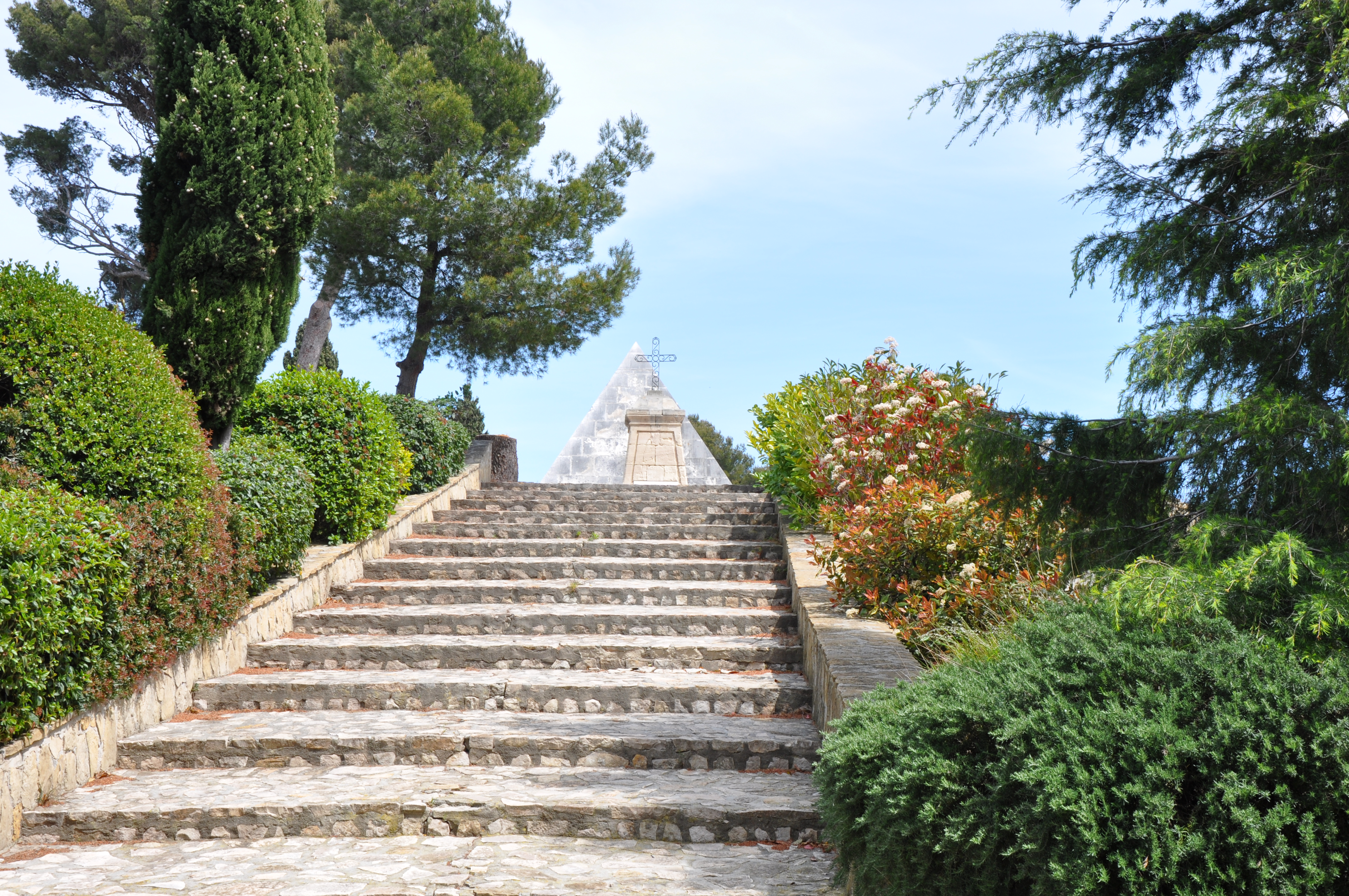
Stairs to the Latouche Tréville necropolis

On 11 April 1950, Saint-Mandrier was made an independent commune from La Seyne-sur-Mer. Louis Clément of the Socialist Party (PS) served as its first mayor for over 20 years. On 16 April 1951, it was officially renamed Saint-Mandrier-sur-Mer.

== Geography ==
=== Climate ===
Saint-Mandrier-sur-Mer has a hot-summer Mediterranean climate (Köppen climate classification Csa). The average annual temperature in Saint-Mandrier-sur-Mer is 15.9 °C (60.6 °F). The average annual rainfall is 647.0 mm (25.47 in) with October as the wettest month. The temperatures are highest on average in August, at around 24.2 °C (75.6 °F), and lowest in January, at around 9.2 °C (48.6 °F). The highest temperature ever recorded in Saint-Mandrier-sur-Mer was 39.3 °C (102.7 °F) on 7 July 1982; the coldest temperature ever recorded was −9.5 °C (14.9 °F) on 9 January 1985.

Climate data for Saint-Mandrier-sur-Mer (Cape Cepet, altitude 115m, 1991–2020 normals, extremes 1968–2020)
Month	Jan	Feb	Mar	Apr	May	Jun	Jul	Aug	Sep	Oct	Nov	Dec	Year
Record high °C (°F)	19.9 (67.8)	20.2 (68.4)	25.4 (77.7)	27.0 (80.6)	30.7 (87.3)	36.7 (98.1)	39.3 (102.7)	35.5 (95.9)	33.6 (92.5)	28.8 (83.8)	22.7 (72.9)	19.5 (67.1)	39.3 (102.7)
Mean daily maximum °C (°F)	11.8 (53.2)	12.2 (54.0)	14.9 (58.8)	17.3 (63.1)	21.2 (70.2)	25.3 (77.5)	28.0 (82.4)	28.3 (82.9)	24.3 (75.7)	20.0 (68.0)	15.3 (59.5)	12.6 (54.7)	19.3 (66.7)
Daily mean °C (°F)	9.2 (48.6)	9.2 (48.6)	11.5 (52.7)	13.8 (56.8)	17.4 (63.3)	21.3 (70.3)	23.9 (75.0)	24.2 (75.6)	20.6 (69.1)	17.0 (62.6)	12.6 (54.7)	10.1 (50.2)	15.9 (60.6)
Mean daily minimum °C (°F)	6.6 (43.9)	6.1 (43.0)	8.1 (46.6)	10.2 (50.4)	13.7 (56.7)	17.3 (63.1)	19.7 (67.5)	20.0 (68.0)	16.8 (62.2)	13.9 (57.0)	10.0 (50.0)	7.6 (45.7)	12.5 (54.5)
Record low °C (°F)	−9.5 (14.9)	−9.0 (15.8)	−5.8 (21.6)	0.4 (32.7)	5.0 (41.0)	9.0 (48.2)	13.0 (55.4)	11.4 (52.5)	7.6 (45.7)	3.0 (37.4)	−0.2 (31.6)	−1.8 (28.8)	−9.5 (14.9)
Average precipitation mm (inches)	71.9 (2.83)	50.0 (1.97)	42.0 (1.65)	55.4 (2.18)	37.6 (1.48)	27.0 (1.06)	6.5 (0.26)	12.1 (0.48)	70.3 (2.77)	107.7 (4.24)	99.0 (3.90)	67.5 (2.66)	647.0 (25.47)
Average precipitation days (≥ 1.0 mm)	6.0	5.4	4.8	5.7	4.0	2.7	1.1	1.6	4.7	6.8	8.0	6.2	56.8
Source: Météo-France

== Demographics ==
Historical population
Year	Pop.	±% p.a.
1954	4,327	—
1962	2,321	−7.49%
1968	3,018	+4.47%
1975	4,272	+5.09%
1982	4,946	+2.11%
1990	5,175	+0.57%
1999	5,232	+0.12%
2007	6,303	+2.36%
2012	5,751	−1.82%
2017	5,862	+0.38%
2023	6,000	+0.39%
Source: EHESS and INSEE (1968-2023)

Its inhabitants are called Mandréens (masculine) and Mandréennes (feminine) in French.

== Economy ==
Once home to a French Naval Air station, its location near the homeport of the French Navy at Toulon has meant that the military has played a huge economic role in the life of the town. Increasingly, Saint-Mandrier-sur-Mer is focused on the tourist industry.

Sights in Saint-Mandrier-sur-Mer
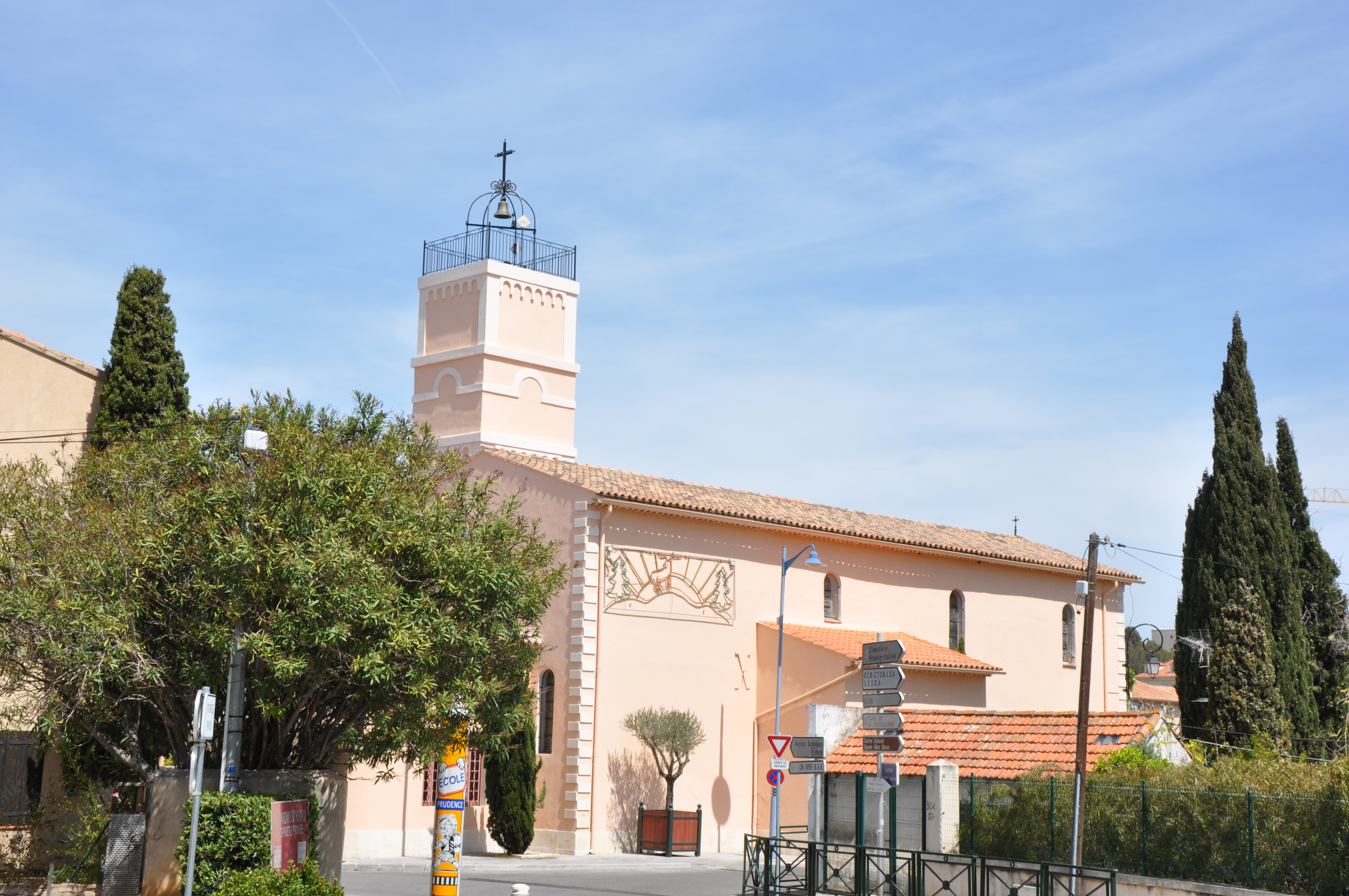
Église Saint-Mandrier

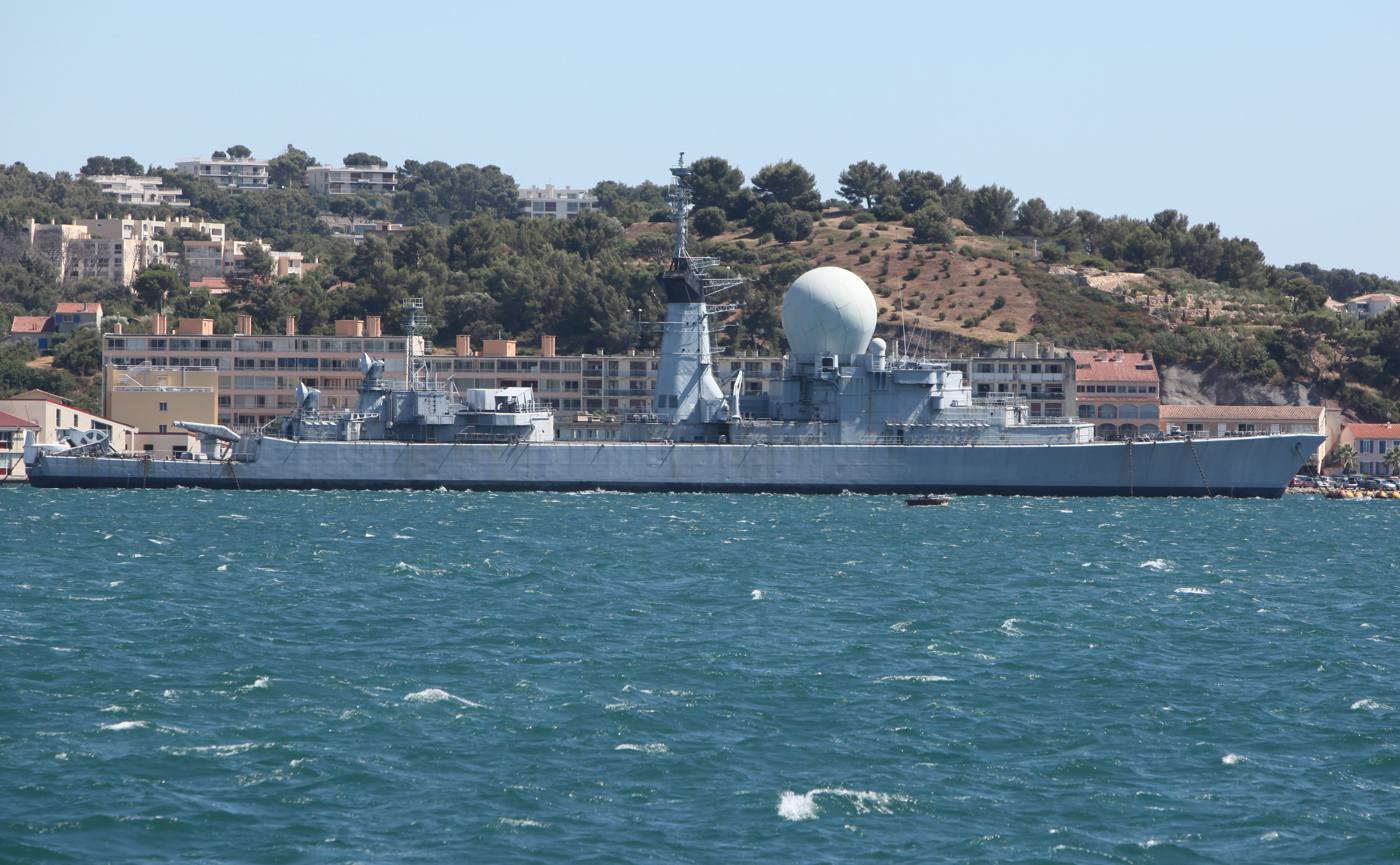
The frigate Suffren in Saint-Mandrier-sur-Mer, retired from active service, used as a wave-breaker (2011)

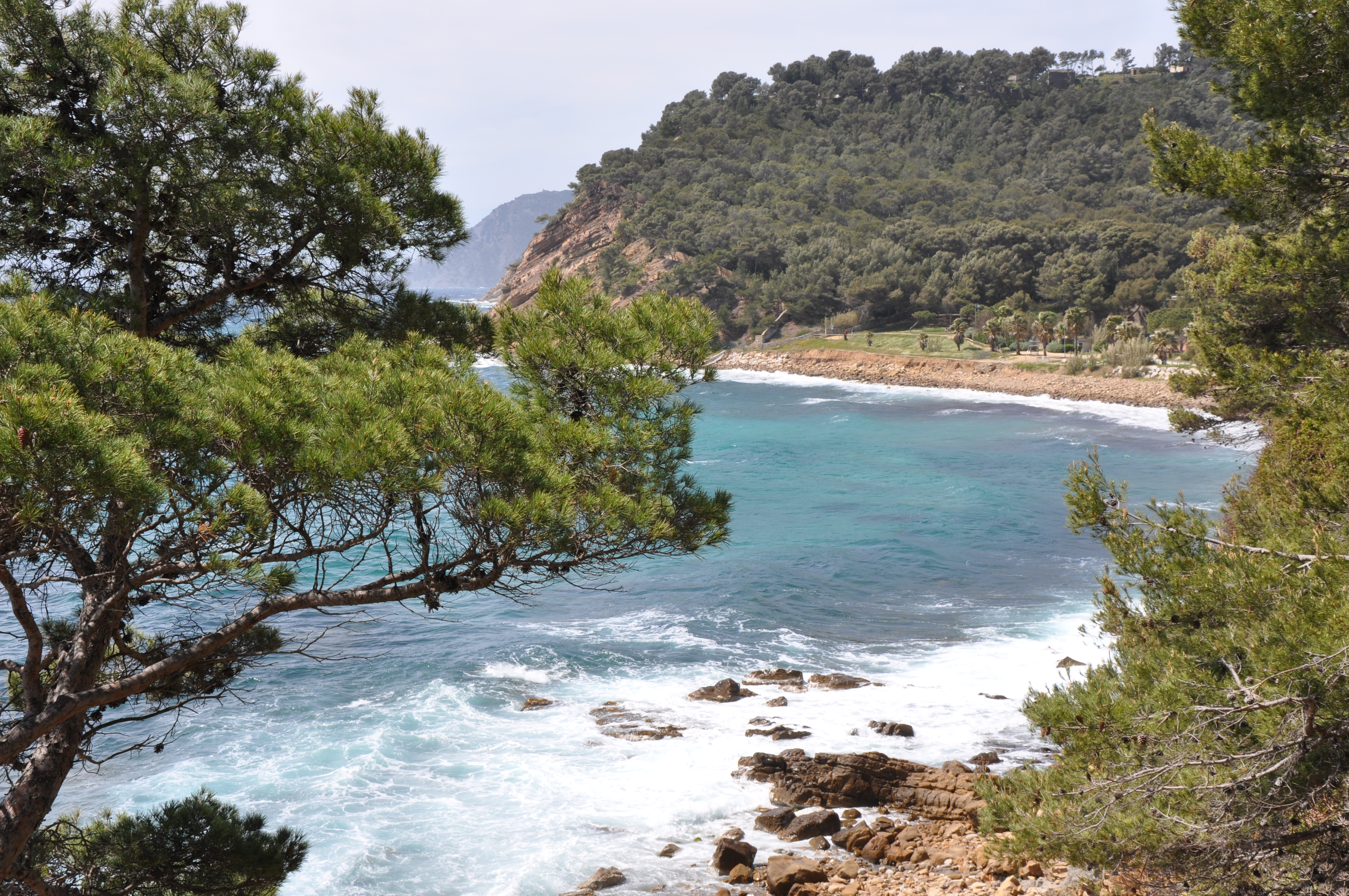
Coastline in Saint-Mandrier-sur-Mer

== See also ==
- Communes of the Var department
