= Françoise Dumont =

French politician (born 1965)

Senator for Var
- Incumbent
- Assumed office 1 October 2020

Personal details
- Born: 9 April 1965 (age 61)
- Party: LR (2015–present); SL (2017–present); LFA
- Other political affiliations: UMP (2008–2015)

Françoise Dumont (French pronunciation: [fʁɑ̃swaz dymɔ̃]; born 9 April 1965) is a French politician who has served as a Senator for Var since 2020. From 2017 to 2020, she served as First Vice President of the Departmental Council of Var, having represented the canton of Saint-Raphaël since 2004.

From 2008 to 2020, Dumont was also a municipal councillor of Saint-Raphaël. In the 2017 legislative election, she was a candidate in Var's 4th constituency, placing third in the first round.
