= Arrondissements of the Var department =

Administrative divisions of Var, France

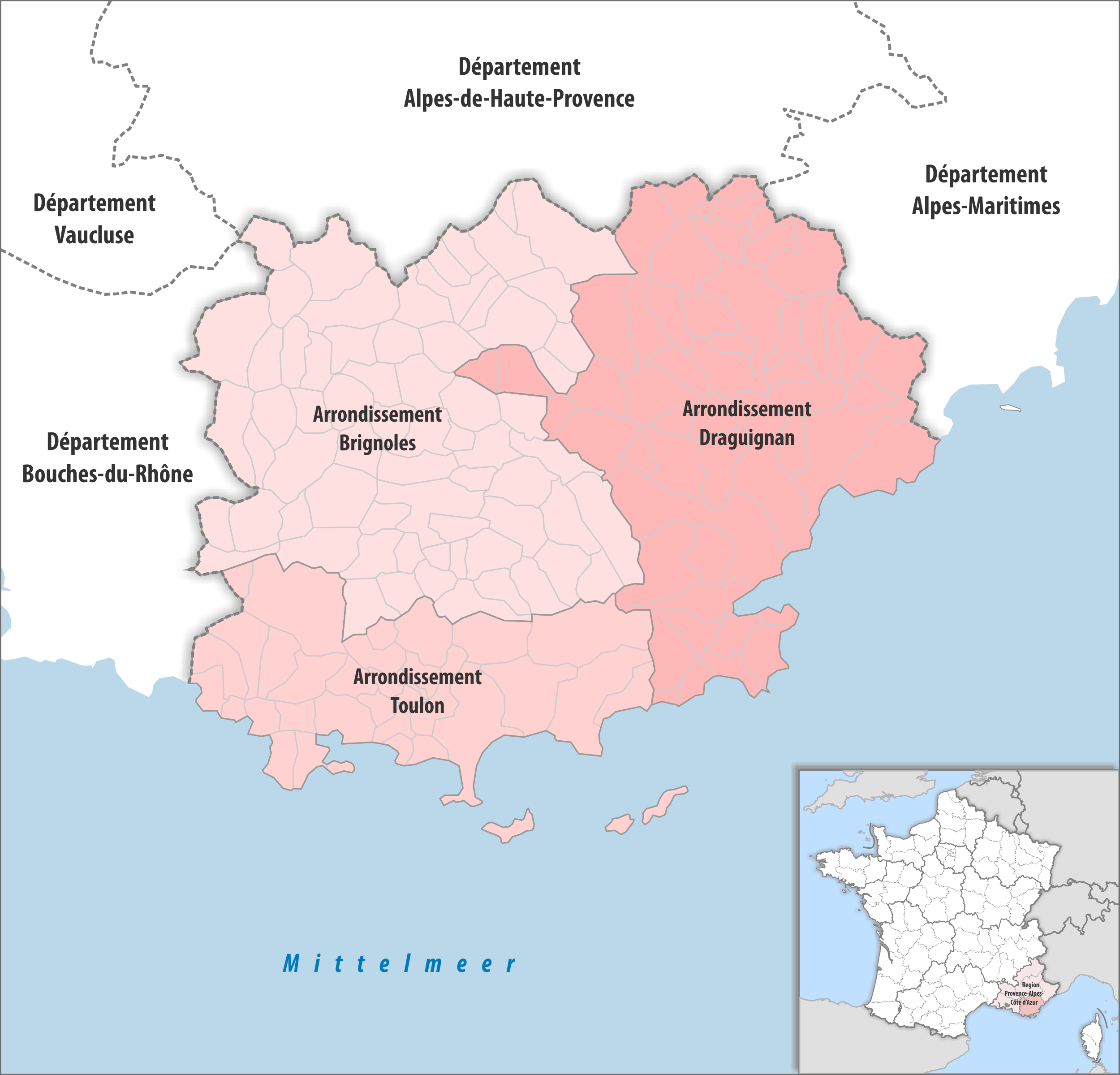
Map of arrondissements of the Var department.

The 3 arrondissements of the Var department are:

1. Arrondissement of Brignoles, (subprefecture: Brignoles) with 67 communes. The population of the arrondissement was 188,423 in 2021.
2. Arrondissement of Draguignan, (subprefecture: Draguignan) with 54 communes. The population of the arrondissement was 316,136 in 2021.
3. Arrondissement of Toulon, (prefecture of the Var department: Toulon) with 32 communes. The population of the arrondissement was 590,778 in 2021.

== History ==
In 1800 the arrondissements of Draguignan, Brignoles, Grasse and Toulon were established. The arrondissement of Grasse was passed to the new department of Alpes-Maritimes in 1860. The arrondissement of Brignoles was disbanded in 1926, and restored in 1974. Toulon replaced Draguignan as prefecture in 1974.

The borders of the arrondissements of Var were modified in January 2017:

- two communes from the arrondissement of Brignoles to the arrondissement of Draguignan
- six communes from the arrondissement of Draguignan to the arrondissement of Brignoles
- two communes from the arrondissement of Toulon to the arrondissement of Brignoles
