= François Trucy =

French politician (1931–2025)

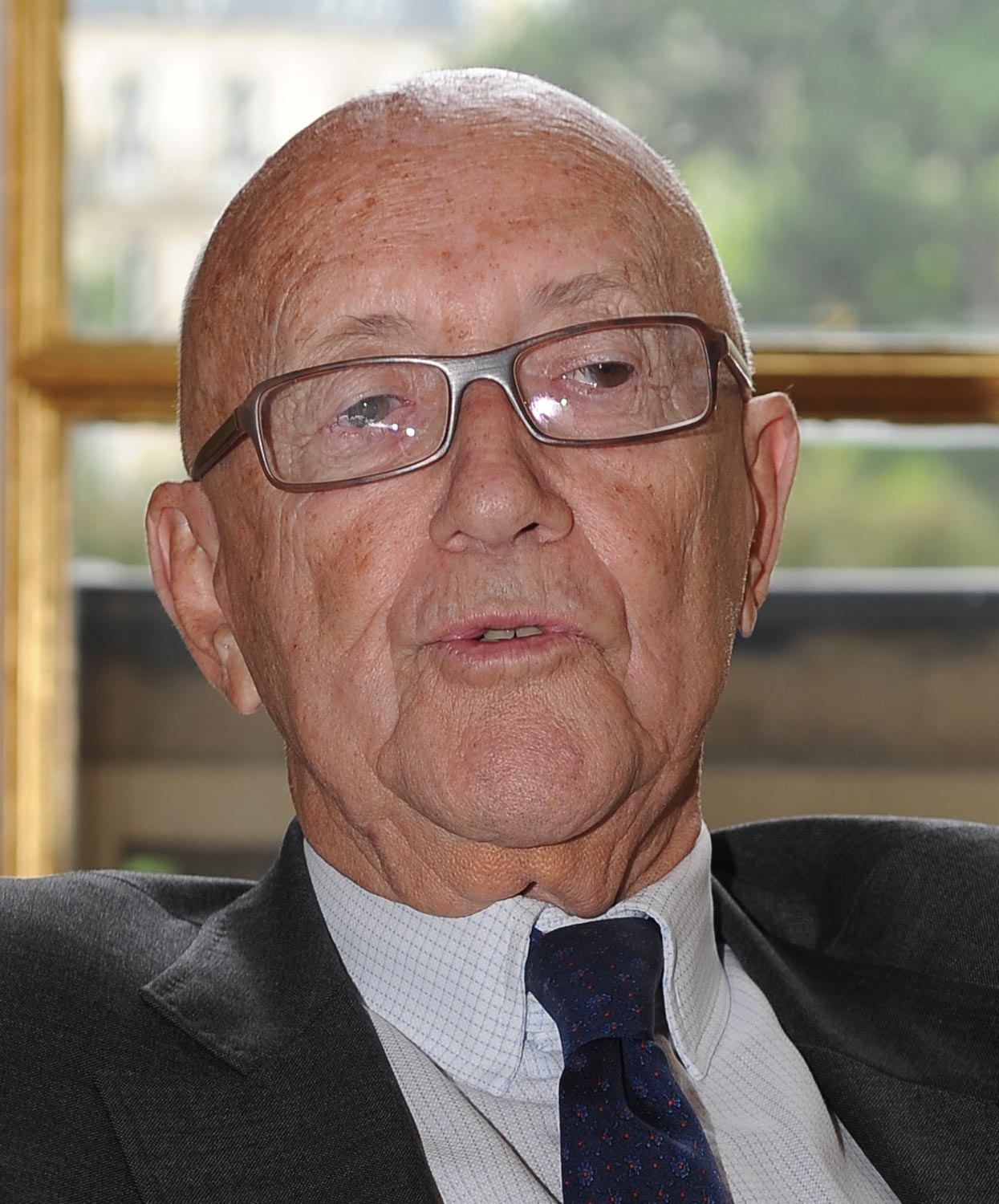

Mayor of Toulon
- In office 3 October 1985 – 18 June 1995
- Preceded by: Maurice Arreckx
- Succeeded by: Jean-Marie Le Chevallier

Member of the French Senate for Var
- In office 1 October 1986 – 30 September 2014
- Preceded by: Maurice Janetti
- Succeeded by: David Rachline

Personal details
- Born: 9 June 1931 Toulon, France
- Died: 25 March 2025 (aged 93) Toulon, France
- Party: UDF; RPR; UMP
- Profession: Biologist

François Trucy (French: [fʁɑ̃swa tʁysi]; 9 June 1931 – 25 March 2025) was a French politician who was a member of the Senate, representing the Var department. He was a member of the Union for a Popular Movement.

Trucy died in Toulon on 25 March 2025, at the age of 93.

== Sources ==
- Page on the Senate website
