= Canton of La Seyne-sur-Mer-2 =

Coordinates: 43.08°N 5.89°E

The canton of La Seyne-sur-Mer-2 is an administrative division of the Var department, southeastern France. It was created at the French canton reorganisation which came into effect in March 2015. Its seat is in La Seyne-sur-Mer.

It consists of the following communes:

1. Saint-Mandrier-sur-Mer
2. La Seyne-sur-Mer (partly)
3. Six-Fours-les-Plages
