= Maurice Arreckx =

French politician (1917–2001)

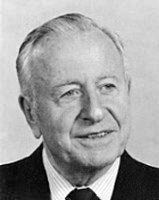

Mayor of Toulon
- In office 1959–1985
- Preceded by: Édouard Le Bellugou
- Succeeded by: François Trucy

Personal details
- Born: 13 December 1917 Saint-Junien, France
- Died: 21 March 2001 (aged 83) Toulon, France
- Party: UDF
- Children: 4

Maurice Arreckx (13 December 1917 - 21 March 2001) was a French politician. He served as the mayor of Toulon from 1959 to 1985. He served as a member of the National Assembly from 1978 to 1981, and again in 1986, before serving as a member of the French Senate from 1986 to 1995.

== Early life ==
Maurice Arreckx was born on 13 December 1917. He received his Baccalauréat.

== Career ==
Arreckx owned a hosiery business in Toulon from 1935 to 1985. He served as the mayor of Toulon from 1959 to 1985. He also wrote two books about the town. He was president of the general council of Var department from 1985 to 1994. He also wrote a book about it.

Arreckx served as a member of the National Assembly from 1978 to 1981, and again in 1986, before serving as a member of the French Senate from 1986 to 1995. He voted in favour of the establishment of the Revenu minimum d'insertion in 1988. Five years later, in 1993, he voted in favour of the continuation of welfare expenditure and state pensions.

Arreckx was jailed from August 1994 to May 1995 for involvement in the murder of politician Yann Piat. In 1997, he was found guilty of accepting bribes of 2 million Francs from a water company for the construction of the Maison des technologies de Toulon. During the trial, it was revealed that Arreckx owned a Swiss bank account named Charlot with 7 million Francs. He was fined 1 million Francs and sentenced to two years in jail. His four children were also convicted, but not jailed. Arreckx was released after one year, in 1998, for health reasons. He wrote a book about his criminal convictions a year later.

He was a Knight of the Legion of Honour, an Officer of the National Order of Merit, and a Knight of the Ordre des Palmes Académiques.

== Personal life ==
Arreckx was married and had four adopted children: Marie-Claire, Marie-Geneviève, Jean-François, and Michel Arreckx.

== Death ==
He died of cancer on 21 March 2001.

== Bibliography ==
- Vivre sa ville (1982).
- Toulon, ma passion (1985).
- Un combat pour le Var : l'histoire du conseil général 1790-1990 (1990).
- Ça suffit ! (1999).
