= Georges Ginesta =

French politician

Georges Ginesta (born 8 July 1942 in Saint-Raphaël, Var) is a former member of the National Assembly of France. He represented the Var department, as a member of the Union for a Popular Movement.

== Biography ==
Jordi (“Georges”) Ginesta graduated as an engineer from École Spéciale des Travaux Publics in 1968.

He was elected deputy on June 16, 2002, for the 12th legislature (2002-2007), in the fifth district of Var. He is a member of the UMP group. He was also mayor of Saint-Raphaël, Var (1995-2017) and president of the Var Estérel Méditerranée urban community (2013-2017). He was re-elected as a member of parliament on June 10, 2007, in the first round with 57.17% of the vote.

On December 11, 2008, he became the new president of the UMP Federation of Var for a three-year term after being elected by his party's departmental committee in an election in which he was the only candidate. He thus succeeded Hubert Falco.

He supports François Fillon candidacy for the presidency of the UMP at the 2012 fall convention.

In Les Frères invisibles, Ghislaine Ottenheimer and Renaud Lecadre point out that Georges Ginesta never made a secret of his involvement in French Freemasonry.

He supported François Fillon in the 2016 French primary election for the center-right. He became senator for the Var department in September 2017, following the resignation of Hubert Falco, who preferred to retain his position as mayor of Toulon.
