= Philippe Michel-Kleisbauer =

French politician

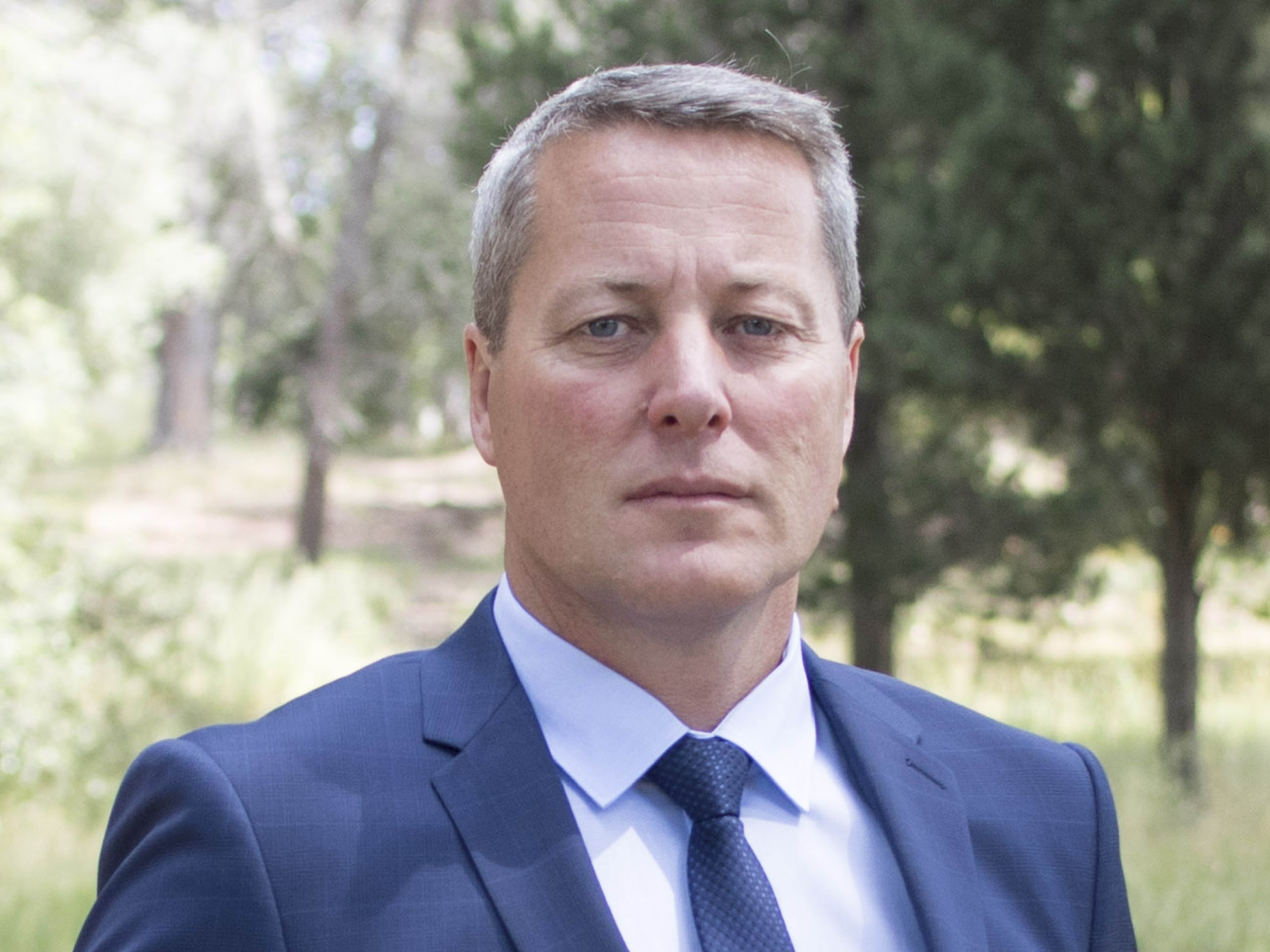
Philippe Michel-Kleisbauer (2017).

Philippe Michel-Kleisbauer is a French politician representing the Democratic Movement. He was elected to the French National Assembly on 18 June 2017, representing the department of Var.
