= Canton of Toulon-3 =

Coordinates: 43.13°N 5.94°E

The canton of Toulon-3 is an administrative division of the Var department, southeastern France. Its borders were modified at the French canton reorganisation which came into effect in March 2015. Its seat is in Toulon.

It consists of the following communes:

1. Le Revest-les-Eaux
2. Toulon (partly)
3. La Valette-du-Var
