= Var (department) =

Department in Provence-Alpes-Côte d'Azur, France

- Department of France
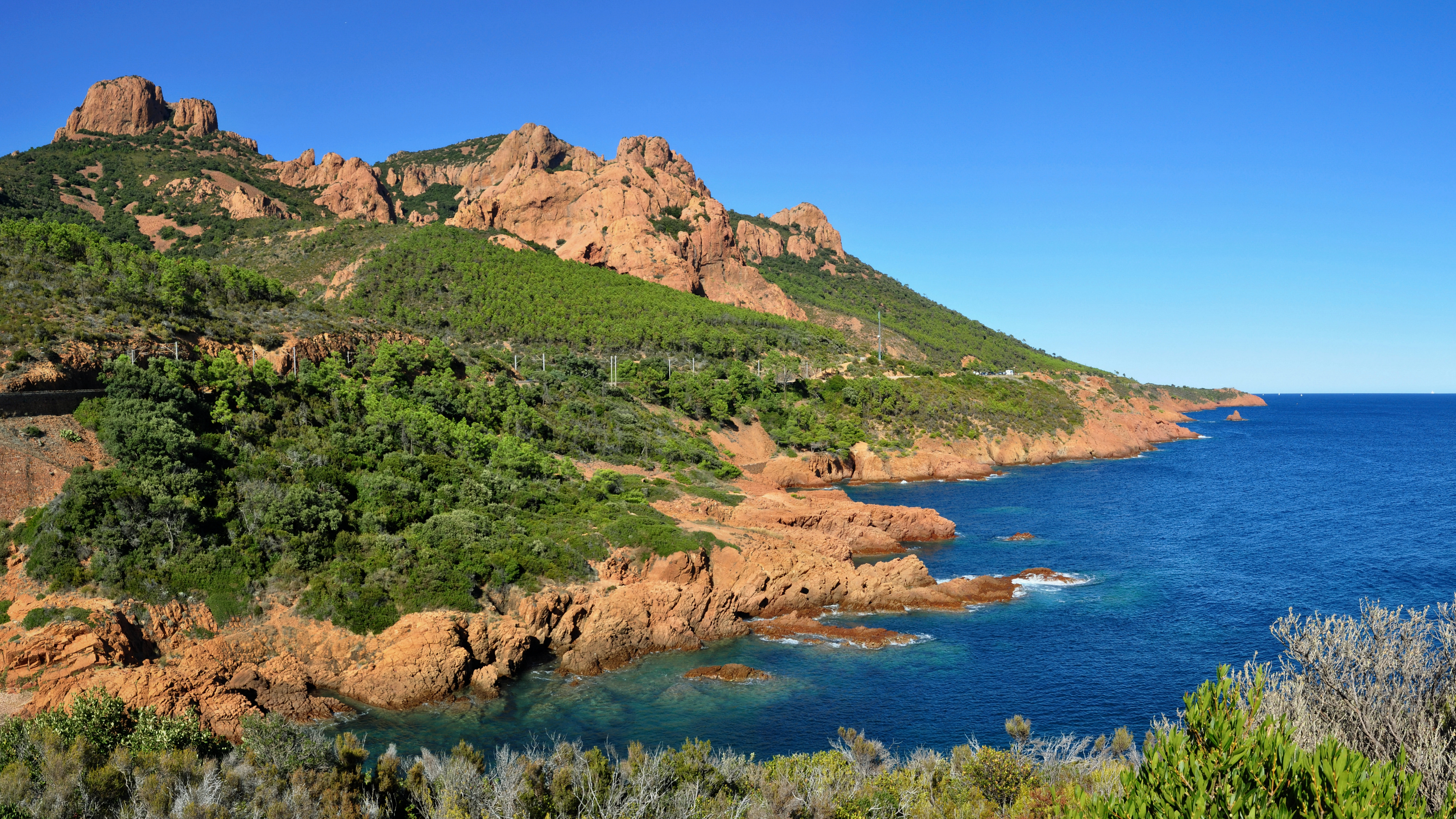
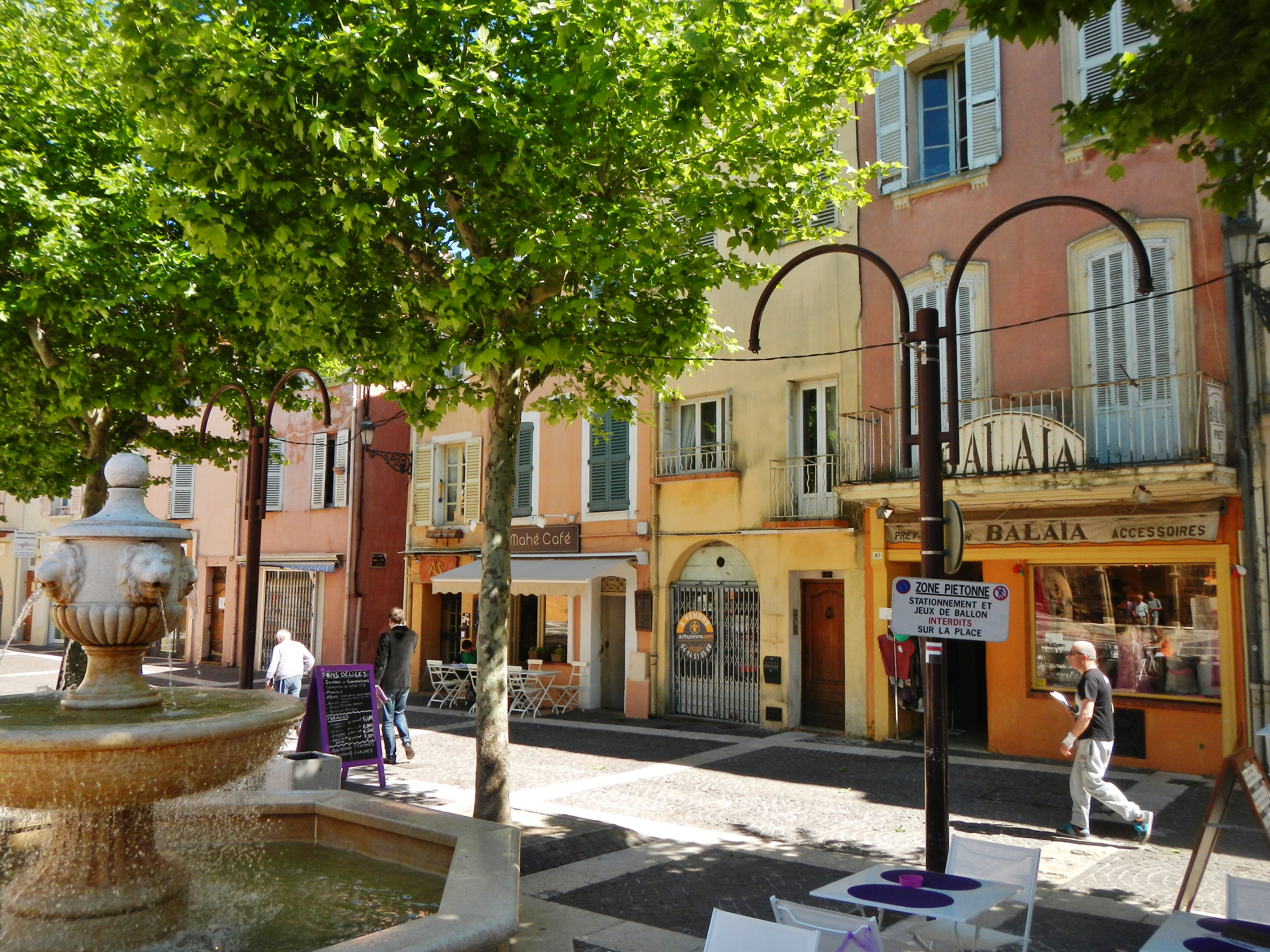
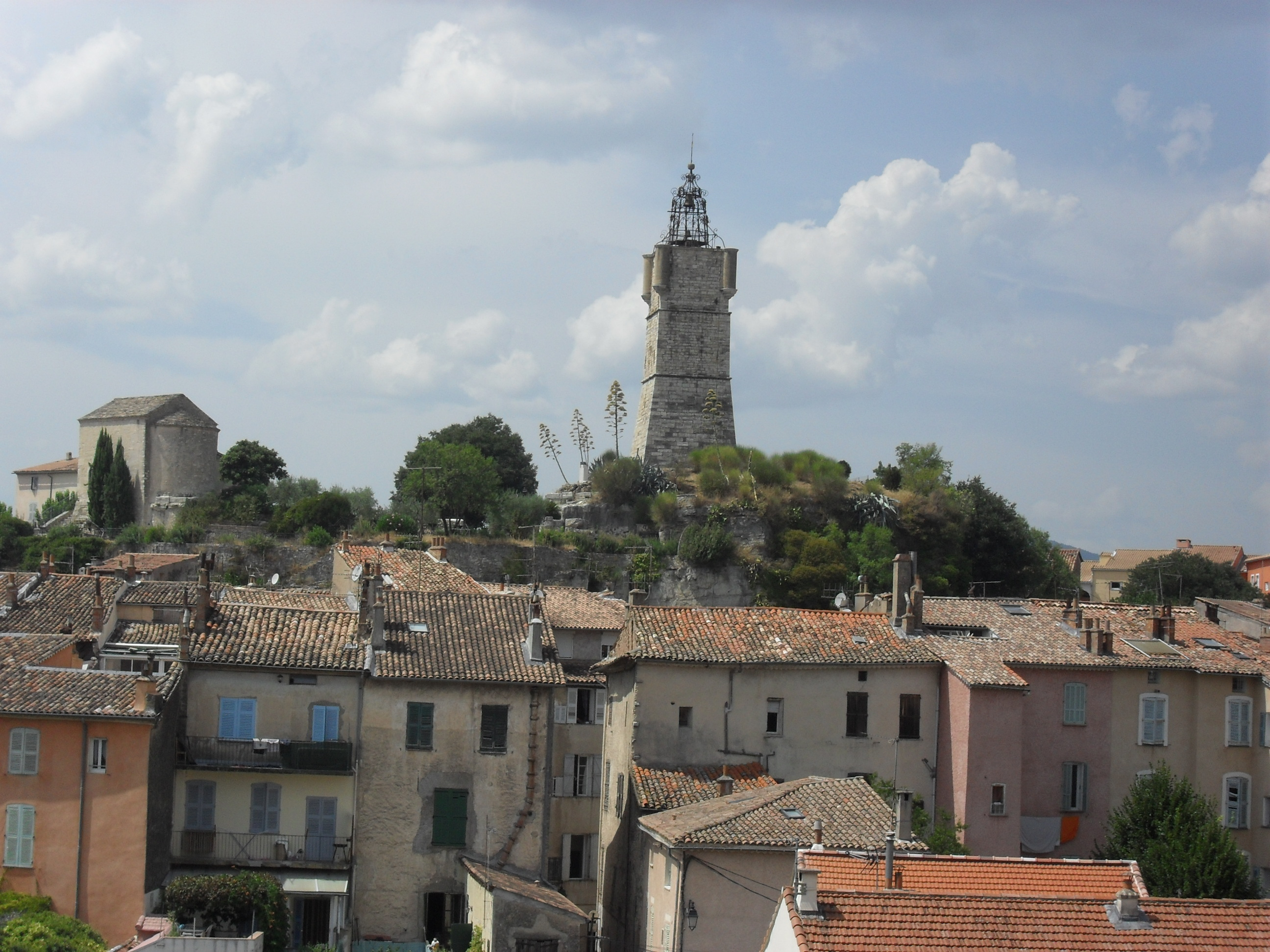
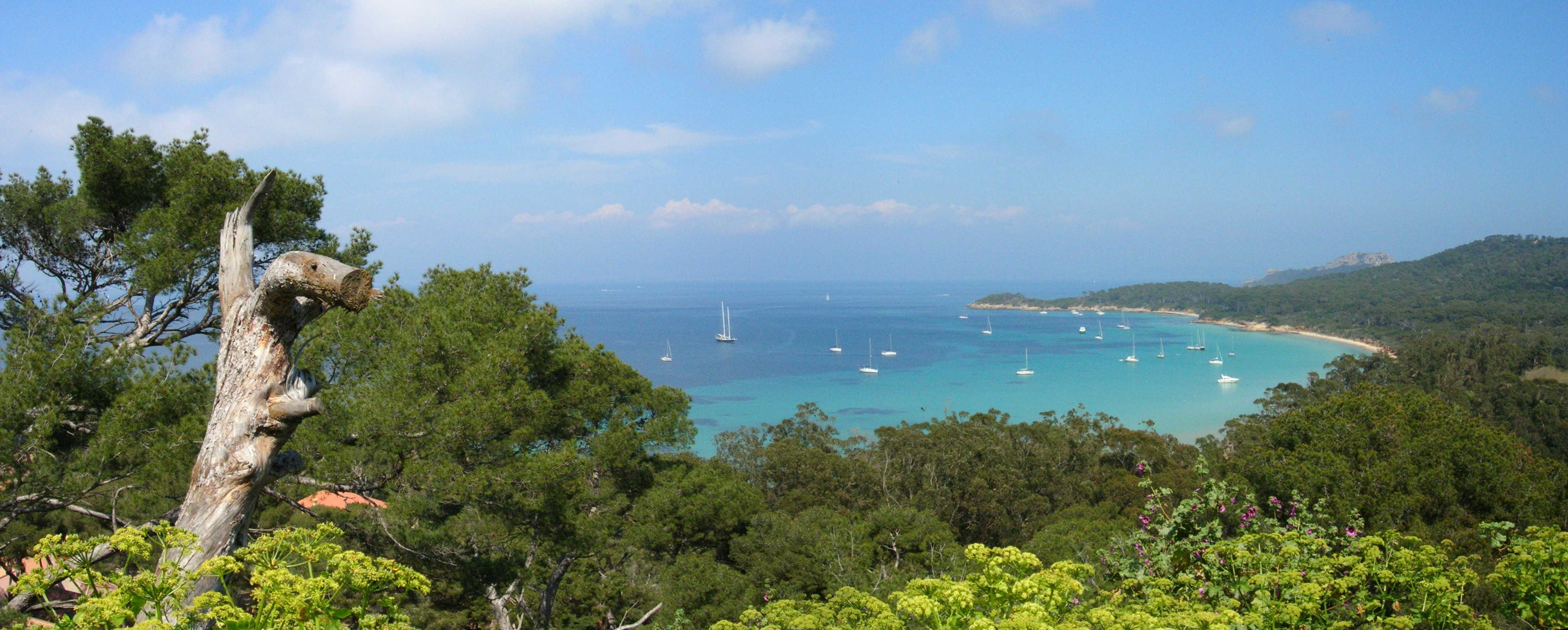
- From top down, left to right: Massif de l'Esterel, Fréjus, Draguignan and Porquerolles

- Coat of arms

- Location of Var in France
- Coordinates: 43°30′N 06°20′E
- Country: France
- Region: Provence-Alpes-Côte d'Azur
- Prefecture: Toulon
- Subprefectures: Brignoles; Draguignan

Government
  - President of the Departmental Council: Jean-Louis Masson (LR)

Area^{1}
  - Total: 5,973 km^{2} (2,306 sq mi)

Population (2023)
  - Total: 1,119,307
  - Rank: 22nd
  - Density: 187.4/km^{2} (485.3/sq mi)
- Time zone: UTC+1 (CET)
  - Summer (DST): UTC+2 (CEST)
- Department number: 83
- Arrondissements: 3
- Cantons: 43
- Communes: 153
- ^1 French Land Register data, which exclude estuaries and lakes, ponds and glaciers larger than 1 km^{2}

Var (French: [vaʁ]; Occitan: [ˈbaɾ]) is a department in the Provence-Alpes-Côte d'Azur region in southeastern France. It is bordered on the east by the Alpes-Maritimes department; to the west by Bouches-du-Rhône; to the north of the river Verdon by the Alpes-de-Haute-Provence department; and to the south by the Mediterranean Sea. It had a population of 1,119,307 in 2023.

The Var department takes its name from the river Var, which flowed along its eastern boundary, until the boundary was moved in 1860 and the department is no longer associated with the river. It is part of the French Riviera, a major tourist area of the country.

Toulon is Var's largest city and administrative capital, known as the prefecture. Other important towns in Var include Fréjus, Saint-Raphaël, Draguignan, Brignoles, Hyères and La Seyne-sur-Mer. Var is known for the harbour of Toulon, the main port of the French Navy, for its seaside resorts, the most famous of which is Saint-Tropez, for some fine examples of Romanesque and other medieval architecture, such as Le Thoronet Abbey and the Fréjus Cathedral, for its wines, particularly the wines of Bandol, as well as for its motorsport race track Circuit Paul Ricard, located in Le Castellet.

== History ==
=== Early years ===
The department of Var was one of the 83 original departments created at the time of the French Revolution, on 4 March 1790, from a portion of the former royal province of Provence.

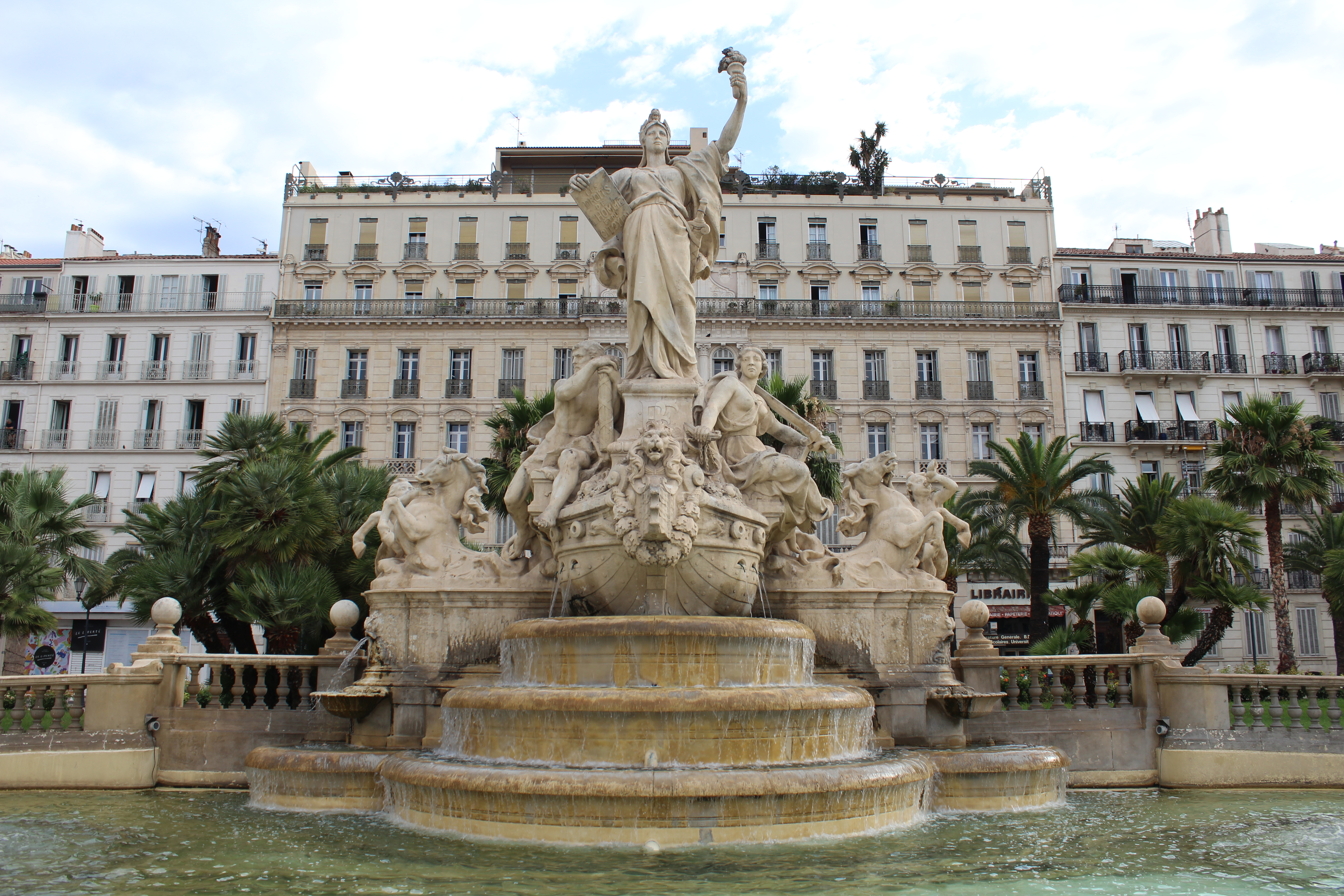
Toulon, the historical capital city of Var, was returned that title in 1974.

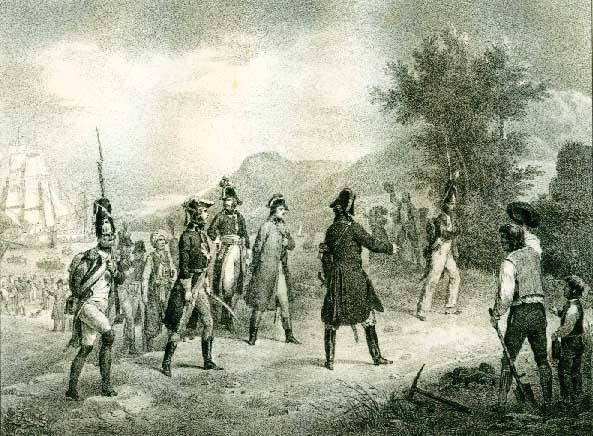
Napoleon arriving in Fréjus, 1799

Its capital was originally Toulon, but this was moved to Grasse in 1793 to punish the Toulonnais for yielding the town to the British in 1793. Subsequently, the capital was moved to Brignoles in 1795, then to Draguignan in 1797. It was not returned to Toulon until 1974.

=== 19th century ===
In 1815, following the defeat of Napoleon at Waterloo the department was occupied by Austrian troops until November 1818. In 1854 the first railroad reached Toulon.

With the creation of the new department of Alpes-Maritimes in 1860 and following the annexation by France of Nice, the eastern part of the department, corresponding to the arrondissement of Grasse, was moved to the new department. This move also shifted the river Var, which had given the department its name, to the new department.

In 1884 a cholera epidemic struck Toulon. The leader of the fight against the epidemic was Georges Clemenceau, a doctor and a member of the National Assembly for the Seine department. He was later elected a member of the Chamber of Deputies for the Var department from 1888 to 1893 and Senator from 1902 to 1920, during which time he also served as Prime Minister of France.

=== Recent times ===
The First World War (1914–1918) stimulated growth in shipyards and military industries in the region, but weakened the agricultural and food industries. In 1942 the German Army moved from Occupied France into the zone libre, which included the Var department. The French Fleet was sabotaged in Toulon Harbour to keep it from falling into German hands. The Maquis Vallier, a group of maquis resistance fighters, was active. On 15 August 1944 American and Free French forces land at Saint-Tropez, Sainte-Maxime and Saint-Raphaël. The Free French fleet arrived at Toulon on 13 September.

In the 1960s about 100,000 French citizens were repatriated from Algeria following the Algerian War of Independence and settled in the Var department. In 2014, Fréjus Mayor David Rachline became the first Senator from Var elected under the National Front (later National Rally) banner; alongside Stéphane Ravier from neighbouring Bouches-du-Rhône, the two became the first National Front members of the Senate under the Fifth Republic.

== Geography ==
The Var department has a surface area of 6,032 km^{2}. It has 420 km of coastline, including the offshore islands. 56% of its surface area is covered with forest. Its geological formations are divided into two regions: one composed of limestone to the northwest of a line between Toulon and Draguignan and of crystalline rock (quartz) to the southeast.

The department is in the foothills of the French Alps and largely mountainous. Major mountains include:

- The Massif des Maures (771 m) and Massif de l'Esterel, along the coast, (618 m) are made of quartz rock.
- The Sainte-Baume mountain ridge (1,147 m), in the west.
- Mountain of Lachens (1,715 m), in the northwest of the department, and the highest point in the Var.

The plateau of Canjuers (French: Plan de Canjuers) in the northeast of Var gradually rises from 500 to 1,000 metres. In the south and west there are several plateaus, such as the plateau of Siou Blanc to the north of Toulon, which rise from 400 to 700 metres in altitude.

- The Canyon du Verdon, the gorges of the Verdon River, is a popular place for hikers, kayakers, and nature lovers.
- The Îles d'Hyères (also known as Porquerolles) is a group of three islands off Hyères. The islands are named Porquerolles, Port-Cros, and Île du Levant. Together, they make up an area of 26 km^{2}. They can be reached by boat from either Hyères or Toulon.

== Climate ==
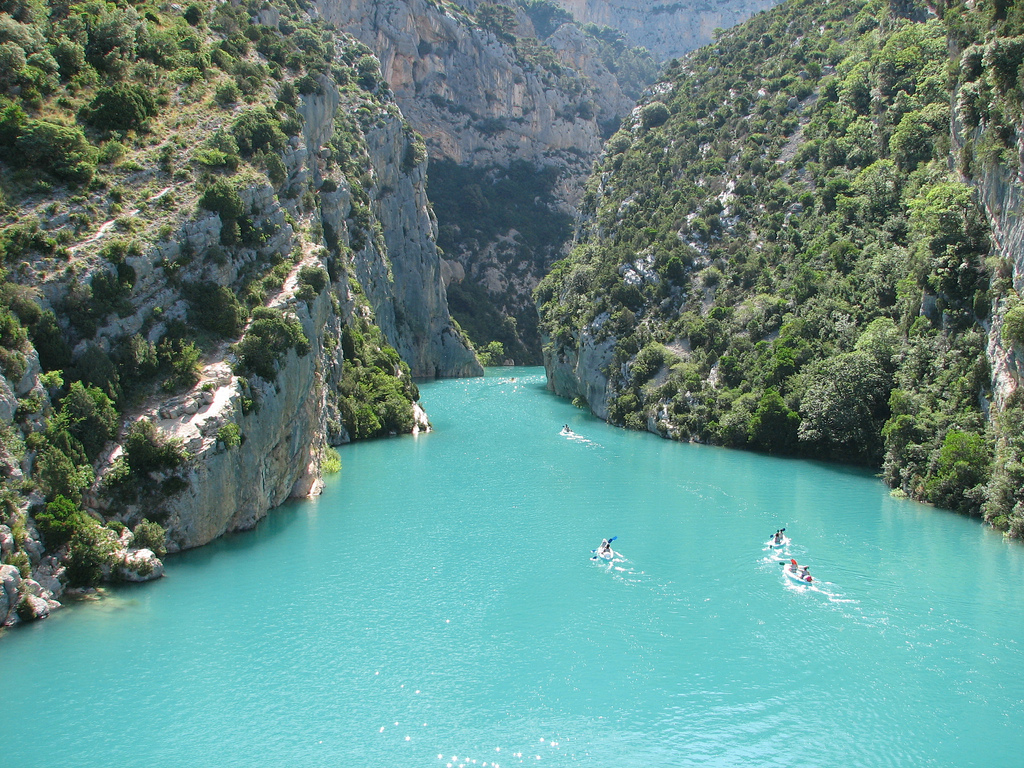
Verdon Gorge

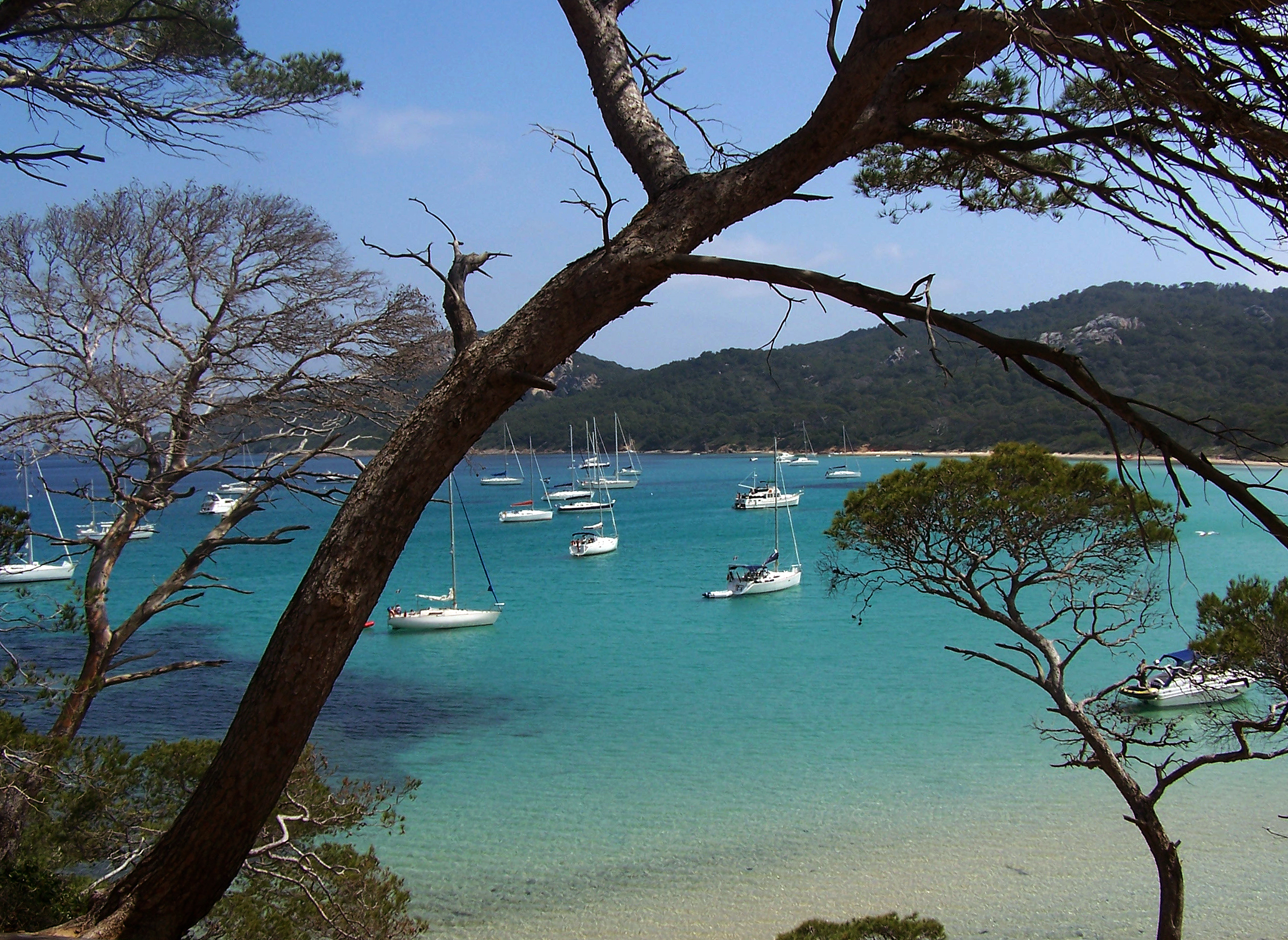
Îles d'Hyères

The department of Var has a Mediterranean climate, slightly warmer, drier and sunnier than Nice and the Alpes-Maritimes, but is also less sheltered from the wind. Toulon has an average of 2899.3 hours of sunshine each year. The average maximum daily temperature in August is 29.1 °C, and the average daily minimum temperature in January is 5.8 °C. The average annual rainfall is 665 mm. Winds exceeding 16 m/s (57.6 km/h) blow an average of 116 days per year in Toulon, compared with 77 days per year at Fréjus further east.

== Demographics ==
Population development since 1801:

Historical population

Year	Pop.	±% p.a.
1801	271,703	—
1821	305,096	+0.58%
1831	321,686	+0.53%
1841	328,010	+0.19%
1851	357,967	+0.88%
1861	315,526	−1.25%
1872	293,757	−0.65%
1881	288,577	−0.20%
1891	288,336	−0.01%
1901	326,384	+1.25%
1911	330,755	+0.13%
1921	322,945	−0.24%
1931	377,104	+1.56%

Year	Pop.	±% p.a.
1936	398,662	+1.12%
1946	370,688	−0.72%
1954	413,012	+1.36%
1962	469,557	+1.62%
1968	555,926	+2.85%
1975	626,093	+1.71%
1982	708,331	+1.78%
1990	815,449	+1.78%
1999	898,441	+1.08%
2007	995,934	+1.30%
2012	1,021,669	+0.51%
2017	1,058,740	+0.72%
2023	1,119,307	+0.93%

Figures before 1861 refer to the old department of Var. Sources:

=== Principal towns ===
In 2022, the population of Var was 1.1 million, of whom 50% live in the agglomeration (urban unit) of Toulon, the prefecture and most populous commune. As of 2023, there are nine communes with more than 20,000 inhabitants:

Commune	Population (2023)
Toulon†	179,116
La Seyne-sur-Mer†	63,732
Fréjus	59,719
Hyères†	55,858
Draguignan	40,826
Saint-Raphaël	37,113
Six-Fours-les-Plages†	37,109
La Garde†	26,476
La Valette-du-Var†	23,719
† part of the Toulon agglomeration

== Politics ==
In the 2017 French presidential election, Marine Le Pen of the National Front won a majority of the vote in Var in the first round, with François Fillon of The Republicans placing second. Emmanuel Macron of En Marche! won a majority in the second round.

In the 2022 French presidential election, Le Pen of the National Rally (formerly National Front) won a majority in Var in both rounds.

=== Departmental Council of Var ===
The Departmental Council of Var comprises 46 seats. In the 2021 departmental election, 26 seats were won by The Republicans (LR), 13 by miscellaneous right candidates, 3 by the Union of Democrats and Independents (UDI), 2 by the National Rally (RN) and 2 by miscellaneous centre candidates. Var currently has no left-wing departmental councillors.

Since 2022, La Garde Mayor Jean-Louis Masson (LR) has been President of the Departmental Council of Var. His governing majority comprises all councillors except the two elected under the National Rally banner, who form the opposition.

=== Representation in Paris ===
==== Members of the National Assembly ====
In the 2024 legislative election, Var elected the following representatives to the National Assembly:

Constituency	Member	Party
Var's 1st constituency	Yannick Chenevard	RE
Var's 2nd constituency	Laure Lavalette	RN
Var's 3rd constituency	Stéphane Rambaud	RN
Var's 4th constituency	Philippe Lottiaux	RN
Var's 5th constituency	Julie Lechanteux	RN
Var's 6th constituency	Frank Giletti	RN
Var's 7th constituency	Frédéric Boccaletti	RN
Var's 8th constituency	Philippe Schrek	RN

==== Members of the Senate ====
In the 2020 Senate election, Jean Bacci, Michel Bonnus, Françoise Dumont and André Guiol were elected from Var. All sit with the Senate Republicans group, except Guiol who sits with the European Democratic and Social Rally group.

== Economy ==
The principal industry of Var is tourism, thanks largely to the big summer influx of tourists to the South of France and the Mediterranean coast in particular, but also inland to the Verdon River Canyon and hilltop villages and vineyards.

=== Tourism ===
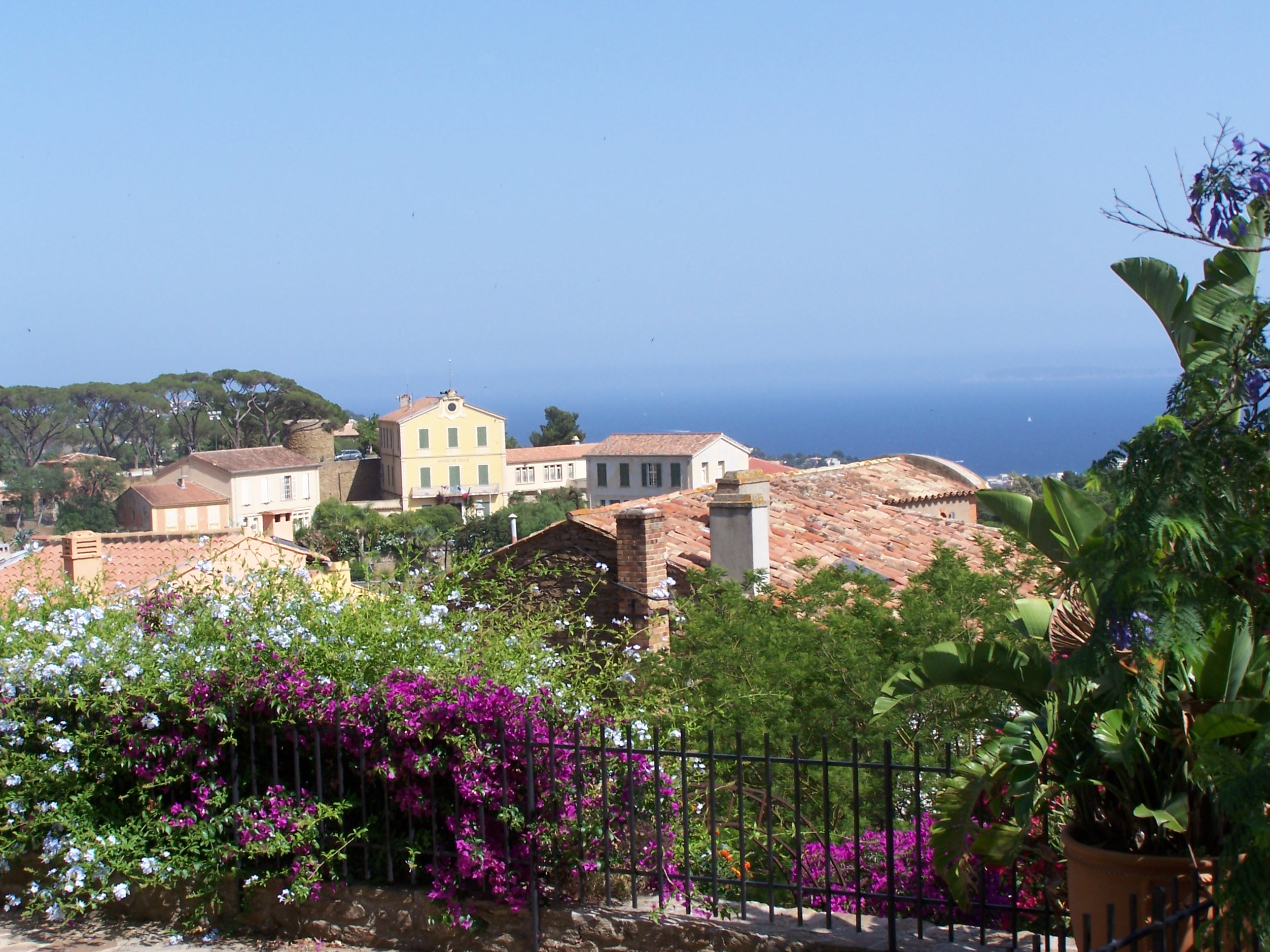
Bormes-les-Mimosas

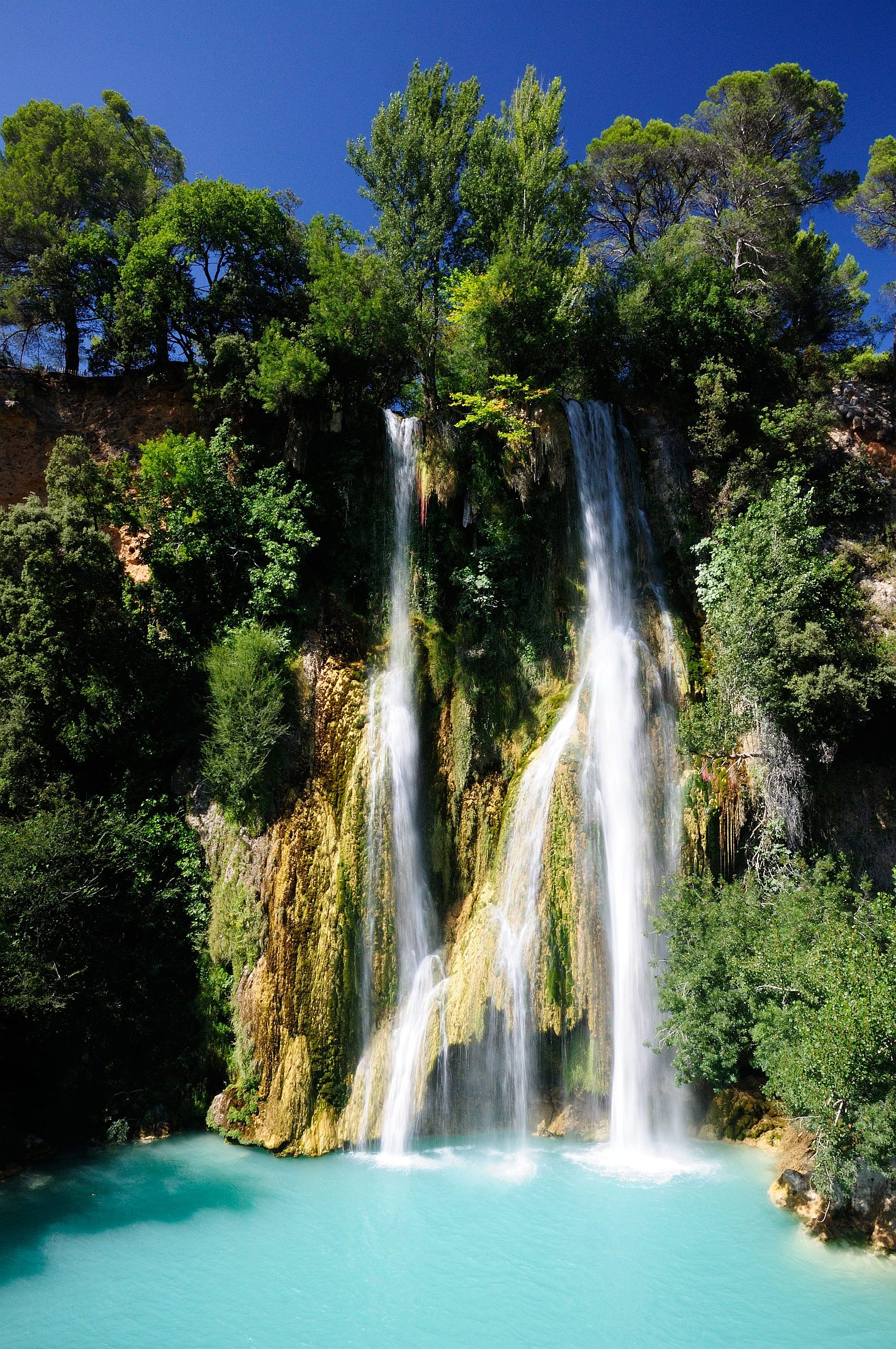
Cascade de Sillans

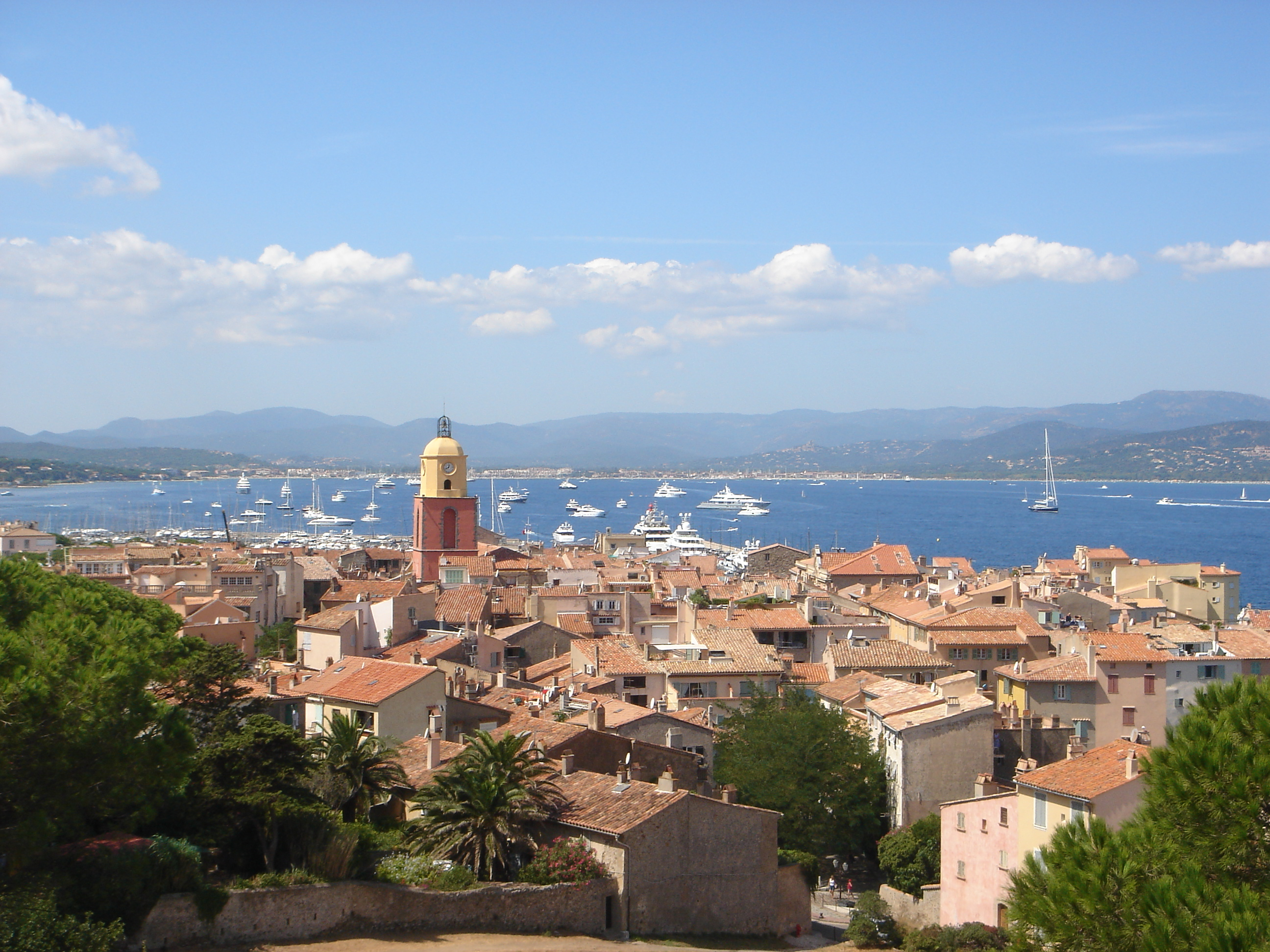
Saint-Tropez

Popular tourist attractions in Var include:

- The port and beaches of Saint-Tropez;
- The seaside village of Sainte-Maxime, with waterfront promenade, shops and restaurants, and a ferry service to Saint-Tropez;
- The beach of Cavalaire-sur-Mer, the longest sand beach on the coast;
- Boat tours of the Rade, or harbour, of Toulon, the main anchorage of the French Navy;
- Wind-surfing offshore of the peninsula of Giens;
- Le Thoronet Abbey, one of the best-preserved medieval Cistercian monasteries in France;
- The Baptistery of Fréjus Cathedral, the oldest Christian structure in Provence;
- The hilltop village of Bormes-les-Mimosas;
- The Îles d'Hyères, including the underwater natural park around the Île de Port-Cros;
- Hiking in the Massif de l'Esterel;
- The hilltop villages of Gassin, Ramatuelle, Montauroux, Fayence, Callian, Seillans, Tourrettes, Saint-Paul-en-Forêt, Mons and Tanneron in the Fayence region;
- The Verdon Gorge, Lake of Sainte-Croix and hilltop villages of the upper Var;
- The hilltop villages, wine caves and vineyards near Bandol
- The 12 beaches of Le Lavandou.

=== Industry ===
The construction industry employs 28,000 workers in the Var of which 4,000 work alone and 4,500 companies employ the remaining 24,000 salaried workers. Industry generates an annual turnover of €2.5 billion. Of this, €500 million is derived from public works.

=== Agriculture ===
800 km^{2} or 13% of the total area is dedicated to agriculture, on which 40,000 people (14% of the Var working population) depend for their livelihoods. The department also has 10 km^{2} of horticultural land (of which 4 km^{2} are covered). Var is France's largest grower of cut flowers, producing some 500 million stems a year. Livestock farming is mainly sheep (50,000) and goats (4,200). Vines and viticultural related activities account for 345 km^{2} of farmland. The 450 domaines or coopératives and the 4 AOCs (appellation d'origine contrôlée) produce 150 million litres of wine a year. Var leads the world in the production of rosé wine.

Other important agricultural products include olives (cultivated on 42 km^{2} of land—a quarter of all French olive groves—and processed in 40 mills), figs (the Var produces 80% of France's figs), and honey (800 tonnes per year). There are also 9 km^{2} of market gardens.

Agricultural turnover in Var is €610 million per year, of which 45% is sales of wines and 42% of horticultural products.

In 2008 the Var department received approximately €15 million in farm subsidies under the EU Common Agriculture Policy, an average of about €6,000 per recipient farm. This compares with an average across France as a whole of over €18,000 per farm.

==== Viticulture ====
- AOC Coteaux varois en Provence is a recent appellation d'origine contrôlée in Provence. The name Coteaux Varois was first used in 1945, and became an AOC in 1993. the name was changed to Couteaux Varois en Provence in 2005. The red wines principally use the grenache, cinsaut, mourvèdre and syrah grapes. White wines use the clairette, grenache blanc, rolle blanc, Sémillon Blanc, and Ugni Blanc. There are 22 km^{2} in this AOL. It produces 80% rosés, 17% red wines, and 3% white wines.
- Bandol AOC, is grown on the coast west of Toulon, mostly around the villages of La Cadière-d'Azur and Castellet. Wines of this appellation must have at least 50% Mourvèdre grapes, though most have considerably more. Other grapes used are Grenache, Cinsault Syrah and Carignan.

== See also ==
- Arrondissements of the Var department
- Cantons of the Var department
- Communes of the Var department
- List of senators of Var
