= Judith Beheading Holofernes (Finson or Caravaggio) =

17th-century painting

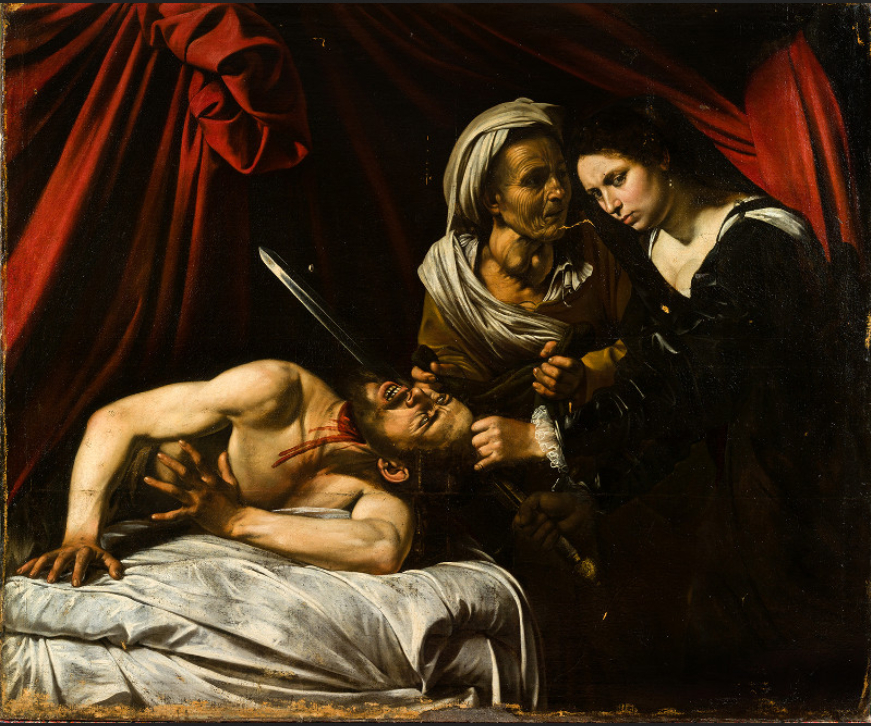
Judith beheading Holofernes

Judith Beheading Holofernes is an early 17th century painting now in a private collection. It is thought to be an earlier version of Caravaggio's work on the same subject or an earlier version of Louis Finson's copy of that work.

== Background ==
When Caravaggio left Naples on 14 June 1607, he left two paintings - the Madonna of the Rosary and Judith beheading Holofernes - in the studio in Naples that was shared by Louis Finson and his partner, the Flemish painter Abraham Vinck. Vinck likely took the two paintings with him when he moved to Amsterdam around 1609. Later Finson also moved to Amsterdam. The two paintings are mentioned again, this time in the will and testament dated 19 September 1617 prepared by Finson in Amsterdam, where he died. In his will Finson left all his interest in the two Caravaggio paintings that he and Vinck had owned in common since Naples to Vinck. Finson died not long after making his will and the paintings became the property of Vinck.

Vinck in turn died in 1619 in Amsterdam and under his will his entire estate was left to his widow. His wife died two years later and a large portion of the estate, including a number of paintings, was sold through auctions held in Amsterdam. The Caravaggios were not among the paintings sold at the auctions. The heirs sold the Madonna of the Rosary after 1619 for 1800 florins to a committee of Flemish painters and 'amateurs' led by Peter Paul Rubens for the Saint Paul's Church of the Dominican friars in Antwerp. The painting arrived around 1623 in Antwerp and was given pride of place on the chief altar of the church. In 1786, Emperor Joseph II of Austria, after ordering the closing of all 'useless' monastic orders in the Southern Netherlands, claimed the painting of Caravaggio for his art collection. It can now be admired in the Kunsthistorisches Museum in Vienna. Caravaggio's work, which was a pious gift of Antwerp's leading artists and an expression of their deep religious devotion had thus become the object of looting by the Austrian rulers.

There has been no confirmed news about the second Caravaggio representing Judith beheading Holofernes co-owned by Vinck and Finson since its mention in the will of Finson dated 1617. It is known that the son-in-law of Vinck who was the executor of the estate tried to sell the more expensive paintings in the estate outside of the auctions. It is recorded that he sent a Caravaggio taxed at 600 guilders to a buyer in Rome but it is not noted what the subject of the work was. A painting of Judith beheading Holofernes said to have been discovered in an attic in Toulouse in 2014 is believed by some scholars and experts to be the lost Caravaggio. It resembles a painting of lower quality in the collection of the Intesa Sanpaolo bank in Naples which has traditionally been regarded as a copy after an original, lost work of Caravaggio made by Finson. Other scholars see in the Toulouse Judith an original creation of Finson rather than a copy after a lost Caravaggio. The Toulouse Judith has even been described as Finson's masterpiece. The work in the collection of the Intesa Sanpaolo bank is regarded by them as a copy by Finson or possibly his friend and pupil Faber after Finson's original creation. The Toulouse Judith was slated to be auctioned in June 2019 but was snapped up by hedge fund manager J. Tomilson Hill through a private sale at an undisclosed amount shortly before the auction was planned to go ahead.
