= Rosa Gilissen-Vanmarcke =

German sculptor (born 1944)

Rosa Gilissen-Vanmarcke (born March 7, 1944) is a Flemish sculptor.

Born in Menen, Gilissen-Vanmarcke trained as a ceramicist, sculptor and fashion designer at the Kortrijk Academy of Fine Arts from 1961 to 1963. She completed her studies at the Technical University in Kortrijk in 1964 with a diploma in Textile Engineer. From 1994, she studied at the Studio for Art Education at the University of Bonn. In 2000, Gilissen-Vanmarcke received a teaching assignment for experimental sculpture at the Studio for Art Education at the University of Bonn. In 2005, she received a teaching assignment for sculpture at the Studio for Art Education at the University of Bonn.

Gilissen-Vanmarcke lived in Breunfeld, municipality of Nümbrecht until 2009. In 2009, the artist and her husband moved their residence to Belgentier in the south of France, where she also has her studio.

== Works ==
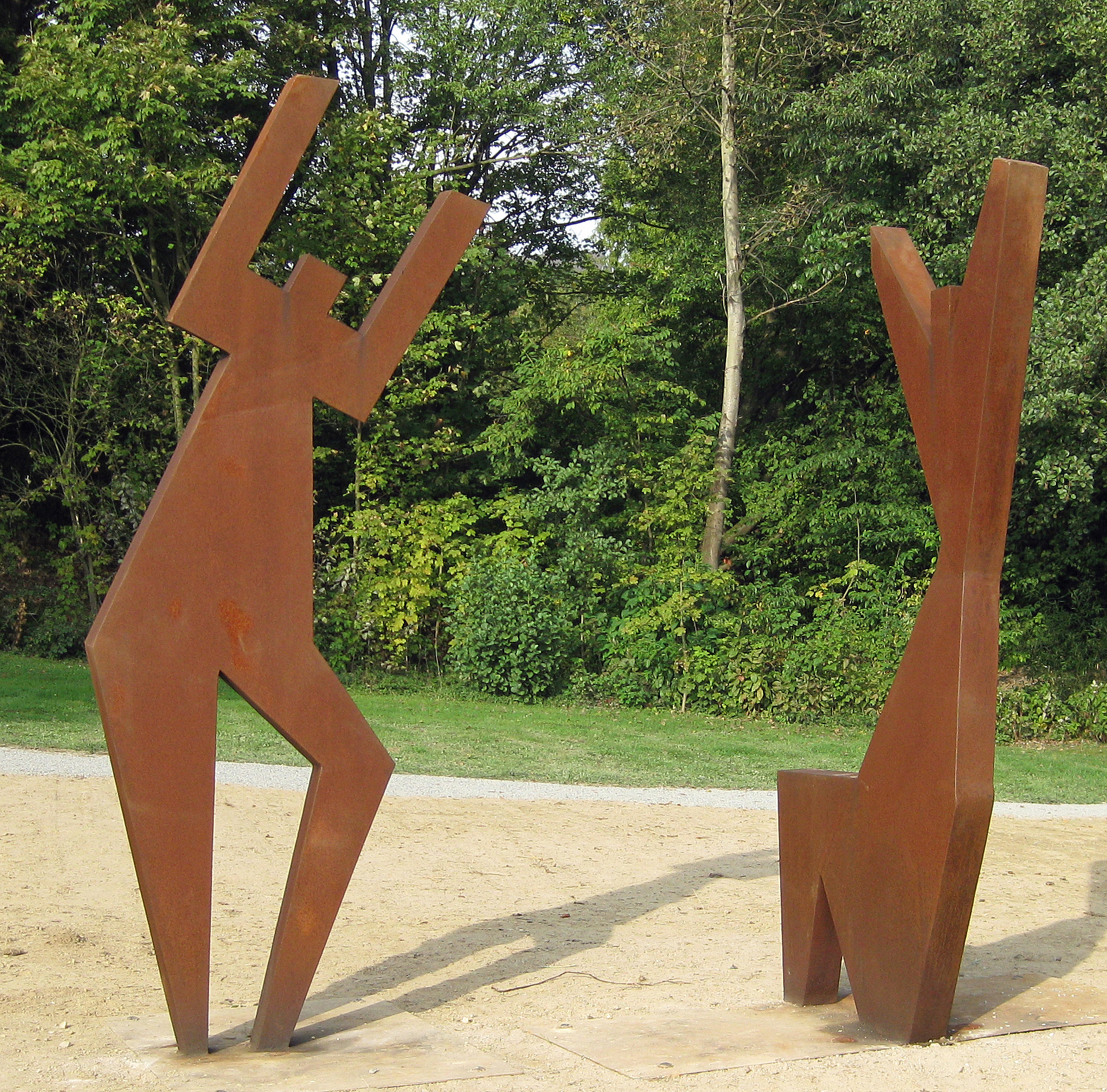
Skulptur Joy, erected 2005 in Nümbrecht

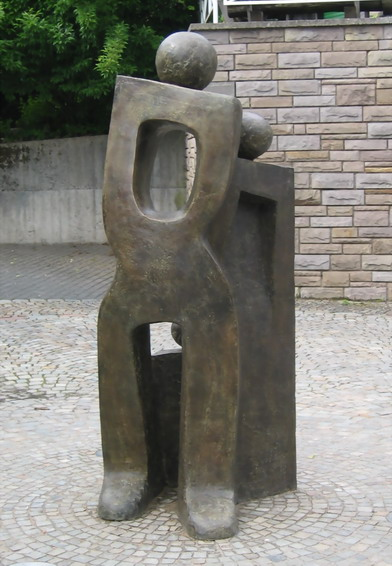
Sculpture A Dream, erected 2005 in Nümbrecht

- Bronze sculpture Encounter at Raiffeisenplatz in Much, inaugurated in 2000
- Ceramic sculpture Bart & Elfi at the entrance to Belgentier, inaugurated in 2002
- Sculpture Fallen Torso, acquired in 2004 by Kunstsammlung Oberberg, Gummersbach
- Bronze sculpture Traum, inaugurated on 4. June 2005 in the Alte Poststraße in Nümbrecht
- Metal sculpture Freude, 2001, inaugurated on 29. July 2009 in the Kurpark in Nümbrecht by the Kunstverein Nümbrecht
- Bronze sculpture Vue de loin, inaugurated in 2015 in Chateau Solliès-Pont
- Reinforced concrete sculpture Couple, inaugurated in 2016 on the Square Eugène et Walda VIES Justes parmi les Nations in Solliès-Pont
- Raku sculpture La petite belle, inaugurated 2016 in Belgentier
- Reinforced concrete sculpture Pereisc, inaugurated 2017 at Chateau Pereisc, Belgentier

== Exhibitions (selection) ==
- 1966, Apollo artist group Kring, Leuven
- 1966, Folklore Gallery, Paris
- 1967, Cultural Center, Brussels
- 1968, Exhibition of 68 Art, Leuven
- 1971, Golden Needle, Leiden
- 1978, Bühnenhaus, Gummersbach
- 1979, Art Fair, Much
- 1982, Gallery of Arts Bernice, Steyl
- 1990, Art Gallery, Frankfurt
- 1994, Galerie Sichel, Esch
- 1997, Galerie Langheinz, Darmstadt
- 1997, Rathaus und Kirche Saint - Martin, Much
- 1998, Haus der Kunst, Nümbrecht
- 1998, Galerie am Brunnen, Bergisch Gladbach
- 2004, Orangery of Schloss Homburg
- 2010 Adieu Nümbrecht, Haus der Kunst Nümbrecht
- 2015, Galerie Pier 3, Sassnitz
