= Judith Beheading Holofernes (Finson, Naples) =

1607 painting by Louis Finson

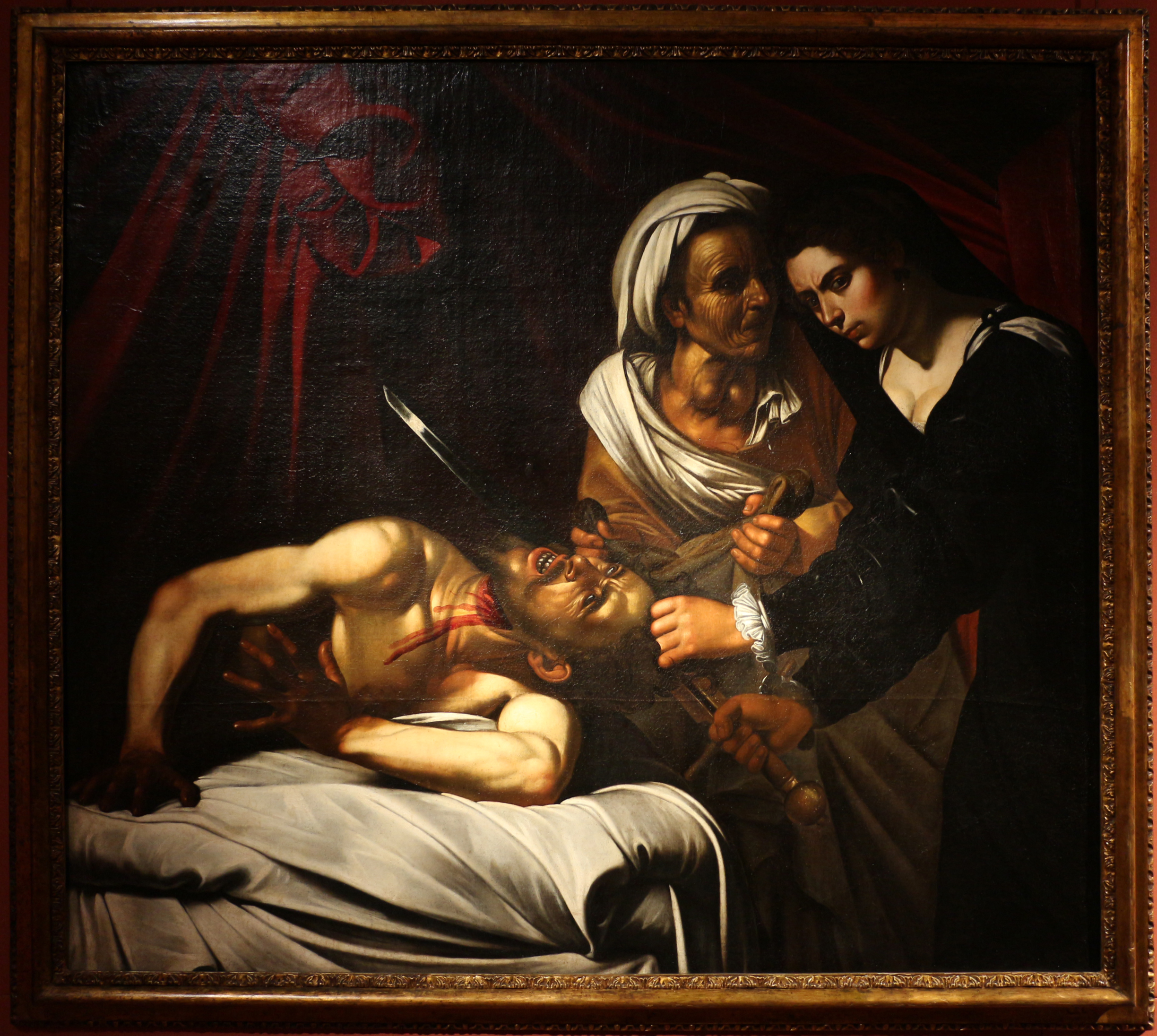

Judith Beheading Holofernes is a 1607 oil on canvas painting by Louis Finson, now owned by the Banco di Napoli and hanging in the Palazzo Zevallos Stigliano in Naples.

Finson stayed in Naples from 1604 to 1612. and there became a Caravaggist before Caravaggio's departure from the city in 1607. Finson then stayed in Provence on the way back to the Netherlands (1613–1615). The work is a copy of Caravaggio's work on the same subject, one of several of Finson's works on that subject. A work rediscovered in Toulouse in 2014 is thought to either be an earlier version of that work by Caravaggio or an earlier version of Finson's work now in Naples.
