= Joseph Gaultier de la Vallette =

French astronomer (1564–1647)

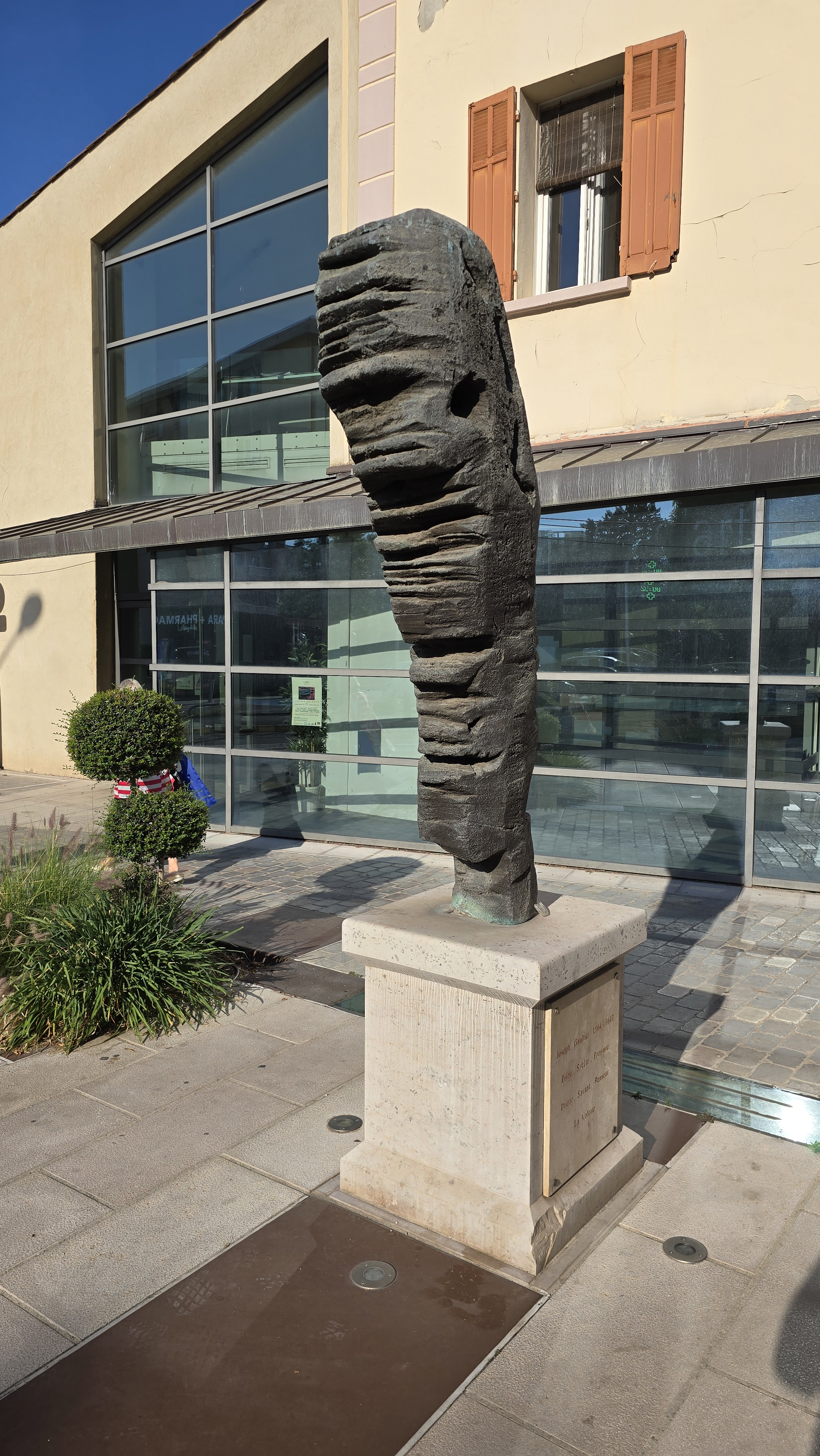

Joseph Gaultier de la Vallette (24 November 1564, in Rians – 1 December 1647, in Aix-en-Provence) was a 17th-century French astronomer. He was a contemporary and friend of Galileo and Peiresc. With Peiresc he observed the moons of Jupiter in November 1610 and earlier that year he had been the second person after Peires to see the Orion Nebula.

== Bibliography ==
- Mario Biagioli, Galileo's Instruments of Credit, 2006
- Mario Biagioli, Replication or Monopoly? : The Economies of Invention and Discovery in Galileo's Observations of 1610
- Jürgen Renn, Galileo in context, 2002

== Sources ==
- (in French) Pierre Humbert, "Joseph Gaultier de la Vallette, astronome provencal (1564-1647)." Revue d'histoire des sciences et de leurs applications I (1948) 316.
