= Nicolas-Claude Fabri de Peiresc =

French astronomer (1580–1637)

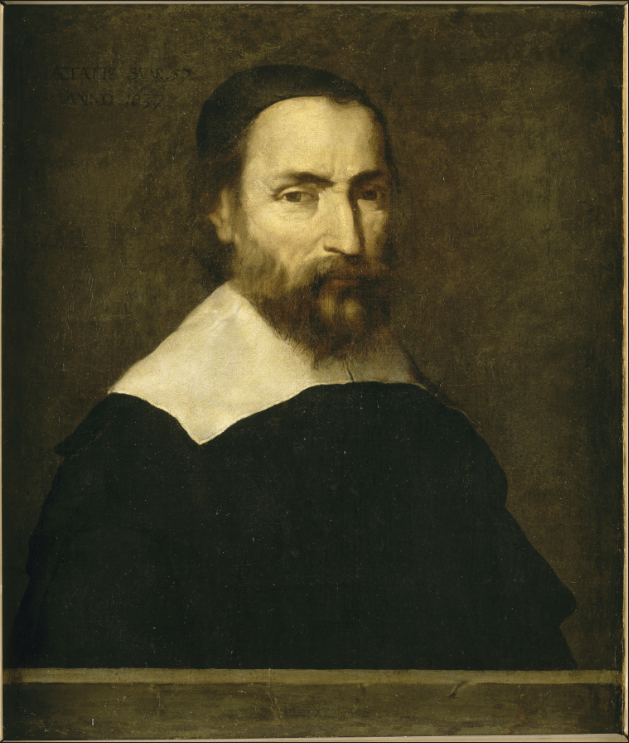
Nicolas-Claude Fabri de Peiresc by Louis Finson

Nicolas-Claude Fabri de Peiresc (1 December 1580 – 24 June 1637), often known simply as Peiresc (French: [pɛʁɛsk]), or by the Latin form of his name, Peirescius, was a French astronomer, antiquary and savant, who maintained a wide correspondence with scientists, and was a successful organizer of scientific inquiry.

His research included a determination of the difference in longitude of various locations in Europe, around the Mediterranean, and in North Africa.

He is notably known for having been Galileo’s lawyer, a close friend of Rubens, an art advisor to Marie de' Medici, a pioneer of Egyptology, and for undertaking the first map of the Moon based on telescopic observations. Marc Fumaroli described him as the prince of the Republic of Letters.

== Early life ==
Peiresc's father was a higher magistrate and city surgeon in Provence from a wealthy noble family, who with his wife fled their home town of Aix-en-Provence to avoid the plague raging there, settling in Belgentier in Var. Peiresc was born in Belgentier and educated in Aix-en-Provence and Avignon, as well as at the Jesuit college at Tournon. At Toulon, he first became interested in astronomy. Studying law and becoming interested in archaeology, he travelled to Italy, Switzerland and France in 1599, and finally finished his legal studies in 1604 at the University of Montpellier. It was also in 1604 that he assumed the name Peiresc after a domain in Alpes-de-Haute-Provence (now spelled Peyresq) which he had inherited from his father, although he himself never visited it.

After receiving his degree, he travelled to Paris (in 1605–1606, with his patron Guillaume du Vair, president of the Parlement of Provence), London and Flanders before returning to Aix in 1607 to take over his uncle's position as conseiller in the Parlement of Provence under du Vair. He held this post until 1615.

== Intellectual and collector ==
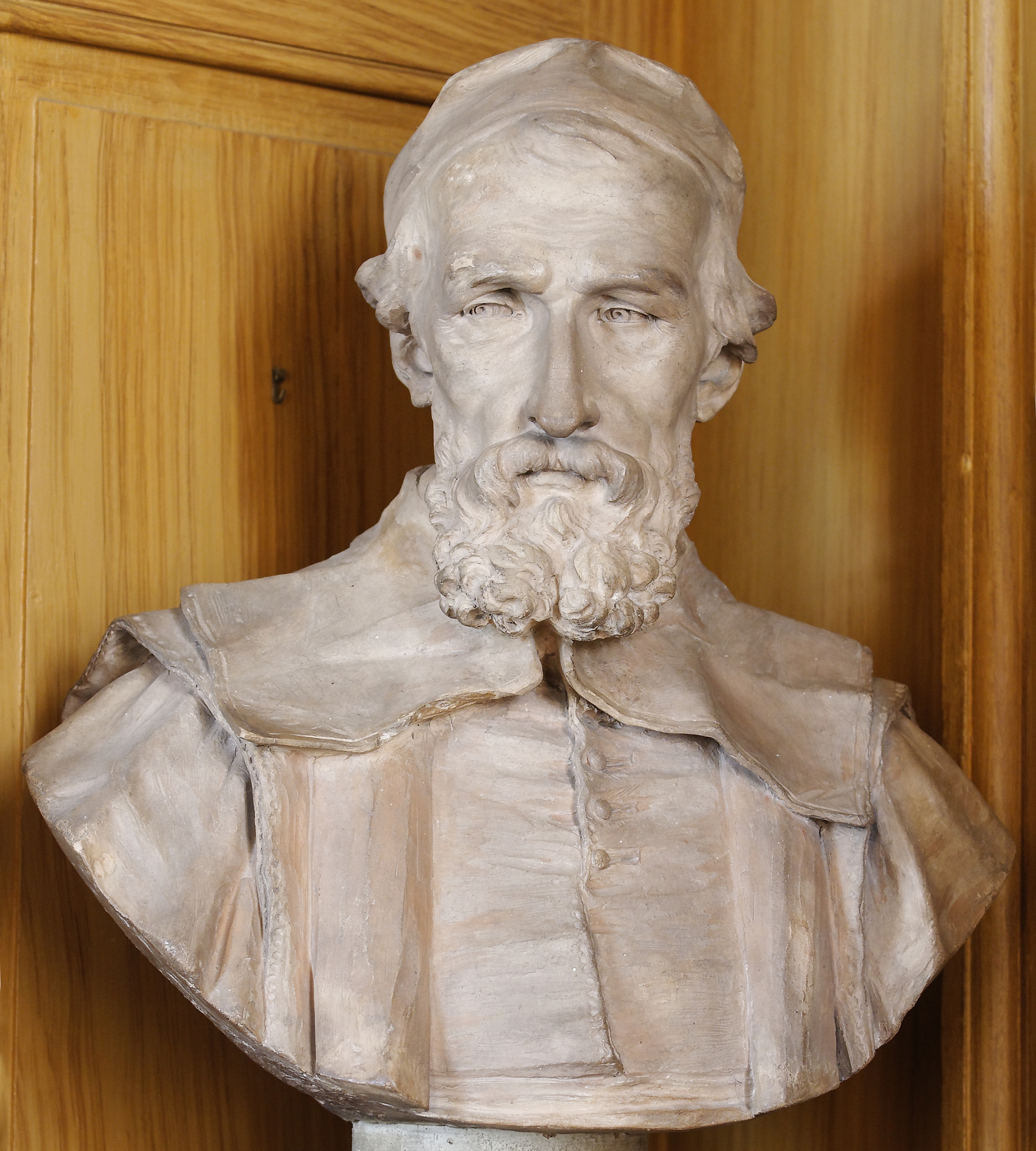
Terracotta bust of Peiresc by Jean-Jacques Caffieri in the Bibliothèque Mazarine

From 1615 until 1622, Peiresc again visited Paris with du Vair. He then returned to Provence to serve as senator of the sovereign court. He became a patron of science and art, studied fossils, and supported the astronomer Pierre Gassendi from 1634 to 1637. Virginio Cesarini proposed him for membership of the Accademia dei Lincei in 1621, but it is not certain whether he joined.

Peiresc's position as a great intellectual at the time of the Scientific Revolution has led to his being called a "Prince of the Republic of Letters". He was also a noted politician in his home region, and a tireless letter-writer (10,000 of his letters survive, and he was in constant correspondence with François de Malherbe, Hugo Grotius, the brothers Dupuy, Alphonse-Louis du Plessis de Richelieu, and with his great friend Rubens. His correspondence to Malherbe throws light on the personality of Malherbe's troubled son Marc-Antoine Malherbe.

Peiresc became one of the first admirers and supporters of Caravaggio in France. He first discovered Caravaggio's works in the Contarelli chapel in Rome in 1600 when he was only 20 years old. In his hometown, he gathered around him a sort of 'caravaggesque workshop of Southern France' with artists including Flemish artist Louis Finson, Martin Hermann Faber, Trophime Bigot and other painters. He promoted the Caravaggesque style by arranging commissions for these artists. He was instrumental in obtaining a number of commissions for Finson, including for history paintings and portraits. Finson also painted a portrait of de Peyresc. Peiresc was an avid art collector and relied on Finson's contacts in Italy to acquire two works of Caravaggio from the Pasqualini family of Rome.

Peiresc's house in Aix-en-Provence was a veritable museum, and held a mix of antique sculptures, modern paintings, medals, books and gardens with exotic plants. He acquired the Byzantine Barberini ivory (it is not known how or from whom) and offered it to Francesco Barberini: the work is now in the Louvre. He had the Codex Luxemburgensis, the surviving Carolingian copy of the Chronography of 354 in his possession for many years; after his death it disappeared. He owned over 18,000 coins and medals, and was also an archaeologist, amateur artist, historian (he demonstrated that Julius Caesar's invasion of Britain set out not from Calais but from St Omer), Egyptologist, botanist, zoologist (studying chameleons, crocodiles, the elephant and the alzaron, a sort of Nubian gazelle with a bull-like head, now disappeared), physiologist, geographer (put on the project of linking Aix to Marseilles), and ecologist.

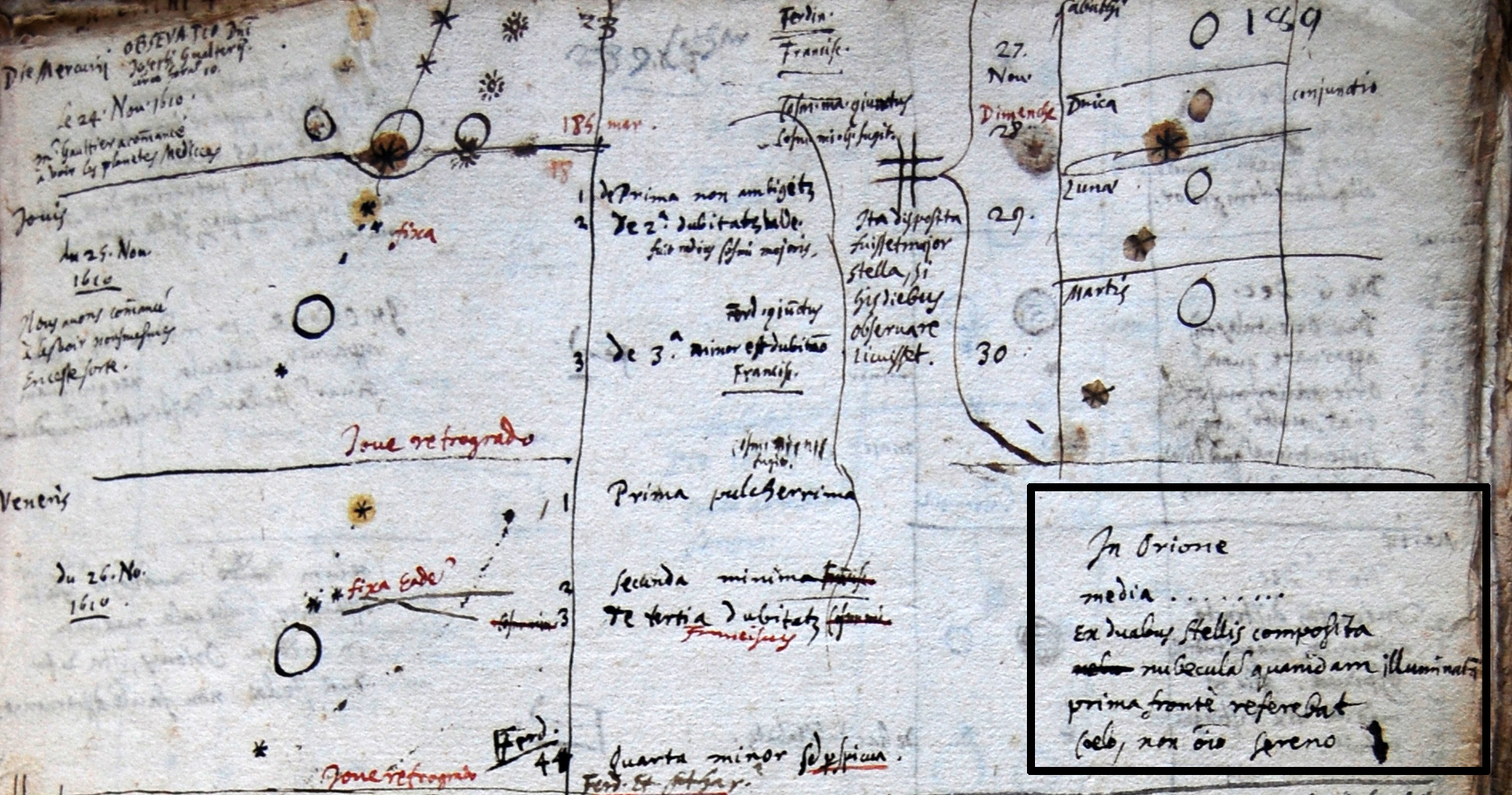
Detail of Peiresc's notes recording his first observation of the Orion Nebula on 26 November 1610

== Astronomer ==
Peiresc was also an astronomer. In 1610 du Vair purchased a telescope, which Peiresc and Joseph Gaultier used for observing the skies, including Jupiter's moons; his courtly suggestion that individual names from the Medici family be applied to these "Medicean stars" was not taken up. Peiresc also made detailed observations of the Orion Nebula in 1610; Gaultier became the second person to see it in the telescope. To determine longitude with greater precision, he coordinated the observation of the lunar eclipses of 28 August 1635 right across the Mediterranean; this allowed him to work out that the Mediterranean sea was in fact 1,000 km shorter than had previously been thought. Peiresc also wrote letters to Galileo, Pierre Gassendi and Tommaso Campanella, two of whom he defended when they were arrested by the Inquisition.

== Final years ==
Peiresc wrote an "abridged history of Provence", but died before editing it: it was only published (edited by Jacques Ferrier and Michel Feuillas) in 1982. With Gassendi's support, notably financially, he and the engraver Claude Mellan began to produce a map of the Moon's surface, but again Peiresc died before completing it.

Peiresc died on 24 June 1637 in Aix-en-Provence.

== Legacy ==
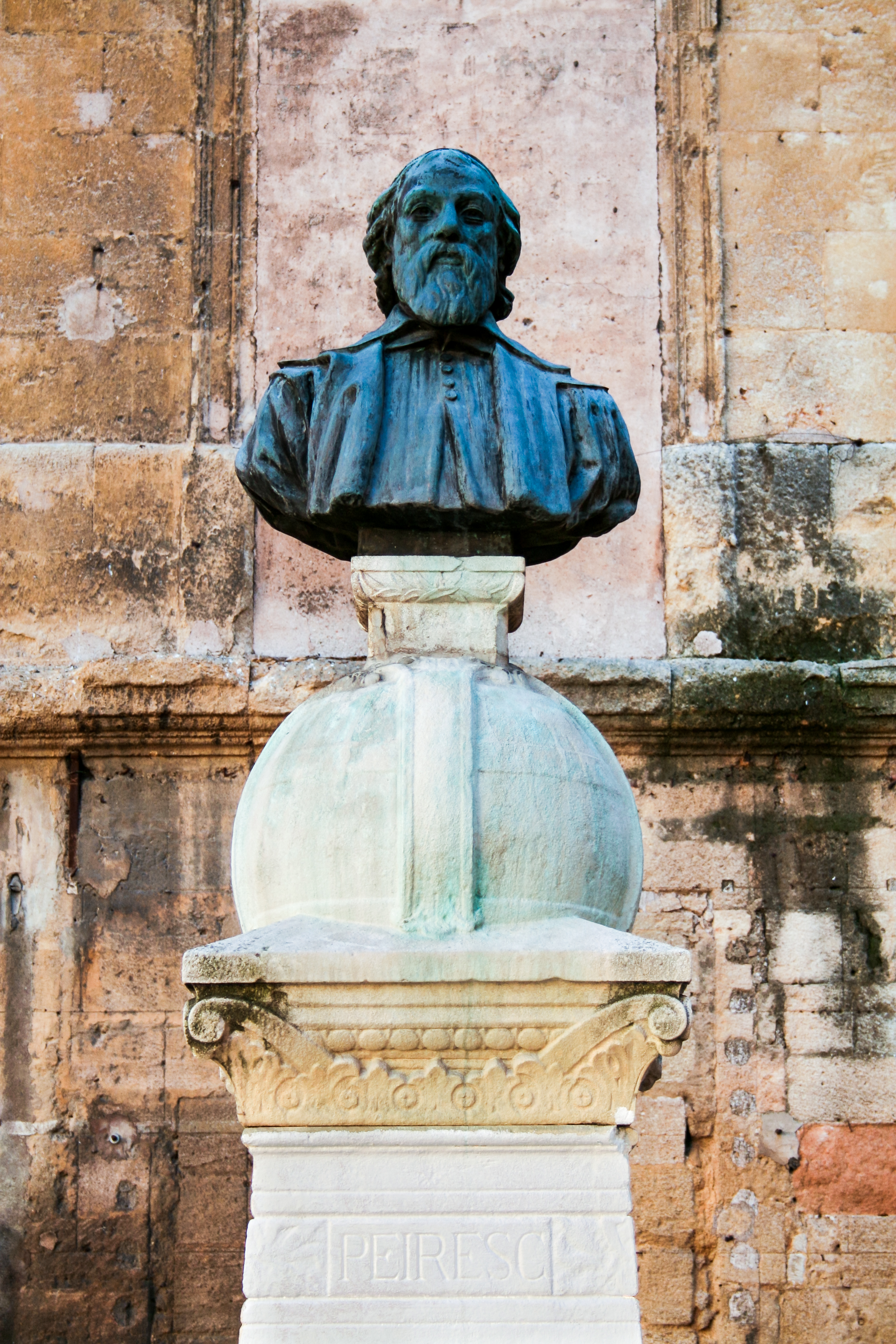
Bust of Peiresc in Aix-en-Provence

A bronze bust of Peiresc stands on the square of the university in Aix-en-Provence, facing the cathedral of Saint Sauveur. His home near the palais de Justice was demolished to build the present Palais, and has completely disappeared.

The village museum in Peyresq near Digne-les-Bains is wholly given over to his work.

Peiresc was honored in 1935 by the naming of the lunar crater Peirescius (46.5S, 67.6E, 61 km diameter); and in 1993 by the naming of the asteroid 19226 Peiresc.

== Works ==
Peiresc's works include:

- Histoire abrégée de Provence
- Lettres à Malherbe (1606–1628)
- Traitez des droits et des libertés de l'Eglise gallicane (1639)
- Vita Peireskii (1641)
- Mémoires
- Bulletin Rubens
- Notes inédites de Peiresc sur quelques points d'histoire naturelle
- Correspondance de Peiresc et Aleandro (1616-1618)

== See also ==
- List of Roman Catholic scientist-clerics

== Bibliography ==
- Bigourdan, G. (1916). "La decouverte de la nebuleuse d'Orion (N.G.C. 1976) par Peiresc". Comptes Rendus. 162: 489–490.
- Gassendi, Pierre (1657). The Mirrour Of True Nobility & Gentility, being the life of N.C. Fabricius, Lord of Peiresk. London.
- Jones, Kenneth Glyn (1991). Messier's Nebulae and Star Clusters (2nd ed.). Cambridge: Cambridge University Press. p. 337. ISBN 0521370795.
- Miller, Peter N. (2000). Peiresc's Europe: learning and virtue in the seventeenth century. New Haven: Yale University Press. ISBN 0-300-08252-5.
- Miller, Peter N. (2012). Peiresc's Orient: antiquarianism as cultural history in the seventeenth century. Farnham: Ashgate Publishing. ISBN 978-1-4094-3298-2.
- Miller, Peter N. (2015). Peiresc's Mediterranean World. Cambridge, Mass.: Harvard University Press. ISBN 9780674744066.
- Roux-Alpheran, François Ambroise Thomas (1846). Les Rues D'Aix, Ou Recherches Historiques Sur L'ancienne Capitale de la Provence. Vol. 1. Aix-en-Provence (France): Aubin. p. 558.
- Tolbert, Jane T. (1999). "Fabri De Peiresc's Quest for a Method to Calculate Terrestrial Longitude". The Historian. 61 (4): 801–820. doi:10.1111/j.1540-6563.1999.tb01046.x.
