= Thorame-Haute =

- Commune
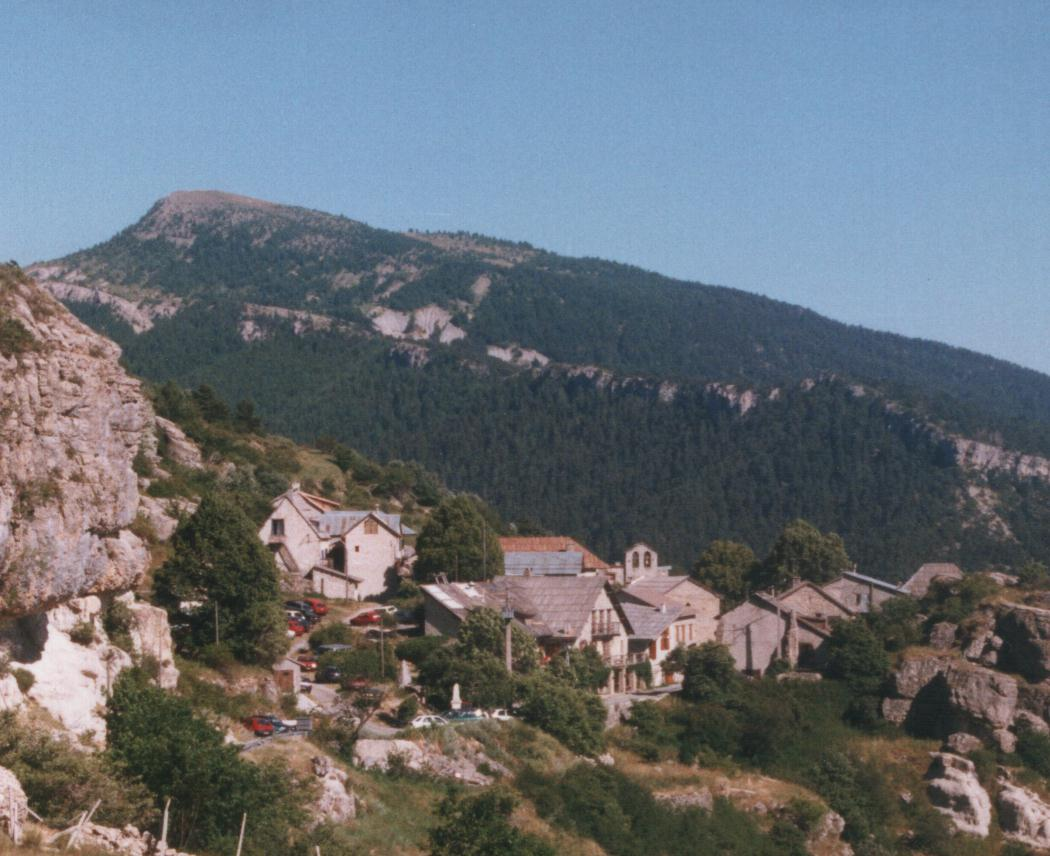
- Village of Peyresc

- Coat of arms
- Location of Thorame-Haute
- Location within France Location within Provence-Alpes-Côte d'Azur
- Coordinates: 44°05′52″N 6°33′22″E
- Country: France
- Region: Provence-Alpes-Côte d'Azur
- Department: Alpes-de-Haute-Provence
- Arrondissement: Castellane
- Canton: Castellane

Government
  - Mayor (2026–32): Thierry Otto-Bruc
- Area^{1}: 108.35 km^{2} (41.83 sq mi)
- Highest elevation: 2,682 m (8,799 ft)
- Lowest elevation: 971 m (3,186 ft)
- Population (2023): 247
  - Density: 2.28/km^{2} (5.90/sq mi)
- Time zone: UTC+01:00 (CET)
  - Summer (DST): UTC+02:00 (CEST)
- INSEE/Postal code: 04219 /04170
- ^{1} French Land Register data, which excludes lakes, ponds, glaciers > 1 km^{2} (0.386 sq mi or 247 acres) and river estuaries.

Thorame-Haute (French pronunciation: [tɔʁam ot]; Occitan: Torama Auta) is a commune in the Alpes-de-Haute-Provence department in southeastern France.

== Geography ==
Thorame-Haute is a village in the Alpes-de-Haute-Provence department, located at the foot of the Chamatte Massif at an altitude of approximately 1,150 metres (3,773 ft) in the valley of the Upper Verdon. The highest point in the commune is the summit of Grand Coyer, reaching 2,693 m (8,835 ft), while the lowest point lies in the Verdon valley. The commune is situated downstream within the Upper Verdon region. Thorame-Haute is surrounded by four notable peaks: Chamatte (2,081 m / 6,827 ft), Cheinet (1,850 m / 6,070 ft), Serpeigier (1,718 m / 5,636 ft), and Cordeil (2,114 m / 6,936 ft).

=== Hydrography ===
The village is situated on the right bank of the Verdon River. The Riou, a small river, flows through the village. To the east, the commune's boundaries reach the valley of the Vaïre. The Lac des Sagnes, an artificial reservoir, is also located within the commune.

=== Villages and localities ===
The commune comprises several villages, including Colle-Saint-Michel and Peyresq, which were independent communes until their merger in 1964 and subsequent attachment to Thorame-Haute in 1974. Peyresq is noted for its remarkable natural setting and restored mountain architecture, a project that began in the 1960s.

Another locality, Ondres, is no longer permanently inhabited and lacks basic infrastructure, including running water, electricity, telephone service, and paved roads. Although a power line was installed in 2014, most residents chose not to connect. However, the population of Ondres can exceed 100 inhabitants during the summer months.

The villages in the commune include Thorame (chief town), Ondres, Colle-Saint-Michel, Peyresq. Other localities include Branchaï, Thorame-Haute-Gare, La Rivière, La Royère, Plan-de-Lys, Fontanil, Font-Gaillarde, L'Iscle, Plan-de-Verdon.

Street names in Thorame-Haute correspond to those listed in the mid-19th century cadastral register, which primarily referred to local districts such as Saint-Pierre, Saint-Julien, Rastellone, Subret, and Peyran. The area known as Riou, located north of and above the historical center, developed during the 17th century to accommodate population growth. Named after the river that flows through it, Riou features organized streets and two fountains, forming a distinct “village within the village.”

=== Roads ===
The chief town lies at the intersection of several regional roads: the D955, which serves the Middle Verdon valley; the D908, connecting the Vaïre valley and the Upper Verdon; and the D2, which leads to Saint-André-les-Alpes via Thorame-Basse and the Issole valley.

Thorame-Haute also has the only railway station in the Upper Verdon. The station is part of the line connecting Digne-les-Bains to Nice. The route includes the longest tunnel on the line, linking the Verdon and Vaïre valleys.

== Population ==
Historical population
Year	Pop.	±% p.a.
1968	206	—
1975	191	−1.07%
1982	187	−0.30%
1990	206	+1.22%
1999	174	−1.86%
2007	222	+3.09%
2012	232	+0.89%
2017	240	+0.68%
2023	247	+0.48%
Source: INSEE

The inhabitants of Thorame-Haute are known as Thoramiens (masculine) and Thoramiennes (feminine) in French.

== Economy ==
Agriculture remains the primary economic activity in Thorame-Haute. Livestock farming is predominant, particularly sheep breeding, followed by cattle and pig farming. Crop cultivation is mainly focused on fodder, though cereals are also grown. The relatively high number of farms in the area, compared to the rest of the valley, is partly attributed to the quality and extent of the arable land surrounding the village.

The commune hosts an agricultural cooperative and a lavender distillation cooperative. The latter attracts some tourist interest, although lavender cultivation has significantly declined since the 1970s.

Tourism remains limited despite some development in the 1970s and 1980s, particularly with the establishment of a Scandinavian-style ski resort at Colle-Saint-Michel. Cultural and academic activities are more prominent, especially those held annually in the village of Peyresq, organised by various associations. A variety of events and activities are offered during the summer season.

== Trade ==
Despite the disappearance of several traditional trades in recent years, the commune still supports a number of local businesses, including hotels, restaurants, a bakery, a butcher-grocer, and a tobacconist. Several artisans also continue to operate in the area.

Thorame-Haute has a post office and a public school that includes both a primary class and a nursery school. The commune also hosts the only railway station in the Upper Verdon valley on the Nice–Digne-les-Bains line operated by the Chemins de fer de Provence (distinct from the French national railway company, SNCF). The station is located approximately 7 km (4.3 mi) downstream from the village in the Verdon valley.

The commune also has an office of the National Forests Office (Office national des forêts, ONF). Historically, Thorame-Haute served as the chief town of a canton formed around 1811, comprising the two Thorame communes. This status likely reflected the combined population of the villages, which at that time exceeded 1,500 inhabitants.

== History ==
=== Etymology ===
The name Thorame is believed to derive from the Latin Turris Amena, meaning "pleasant tower" or more broadly, "pleasant place." This likely reflects both the Roman administrative presence in the area and the site's favourable geographical features, including its east–west oriented valley, exposure to sunlight, and fertile land.

The Latin term turris did not solely refer to a tower in the modern sense, but more generally to a built-up or fortified place capable of serving various administrative or strategic functions. Over time, the name evolved into Toramena or Thoramena, and on several 17th-century maps, it appears as Thoramenes. The current form, Thorame, is considered a modern adaptation into French. There is also a feminine variant of the name.

=== Antiquity ===
The name Eturamina is often associated with the Roman period and is believed to refer to the territory that later became the two Thorame communes. During the Gallo-Roman era, the village held a notable position within the administrative hierarchy, reportedly having the status of a civitas, similar to other regional centres such as Glandevès (Entrevaux), Senensis (Senez), and Dinia (Digne-les-Bains).

Eturamina was among the earliest episcopal sees in Haute-Provence in the 4th century, before the bishopric was transferred to Senez. A Roman tegula (roof tile) engraved with Latin inscriptions was discovered during drainage works in the 19th century and is now preserved at the Musée des Antiquités Nationales in Saint-Germain-en-Laye.

The name of Bishop Sévérianus is associated with Eturamina; he is recorded in several church councils, indicating the religious importance of the site during Late Antiquity. It is highly probable that the location was chosen as part of an early Christian effort to evangelise the populations of the alpine valleys. This would also explain the subsequent transfer of the episcopal seat to Senez in the early 5th century.

=== Middle Ages ===
During the Middle Ages, several historical records reference monastic establishments in the area, particularly those associated with the Abbey of Saint-Victor in Marseille, which mention Thoramina as early as the 13th century. This period also saw the settlement of wealthy seigneurial families in the region.

It is believed that the division of the territory into two separate communes dates back to this time, distinguished by geographical qualifiers: Supériori (Upper) and Infériori (Lower). Thoramina Supériori eventually evolved into what is now known as Thorame-Haute.

The 13th century is also marked by the emergence of a local legend involving a celestial apparition (apparition céleste), which is said to be the origin of the Chapel of Notre-Dame-de-la-Fleur and its associated pilgrimage, which continues to this day.

The historical and architectural heritage of this period remains poorly understood, largely due to fragmented and compartmentalised sources. Records indicate the presence of fifteen noble families up until the French Revolution in 1789. The last recorded transfer of seigneurial rights was to Balthazar de Villeneuve by the Pazery family on 17 June 1711.

Notable seigneurial families included the Lords of Glandevez (14th century), followed by the families of Villeneuve, Gassendi, and Pazery.

=== Renaissance ===
In 1574, the village was attacked by Huguenot forces during the French Wars of Religion, leading to the destruction of Fort Saint-George. The Upper Verdon valley was significantly affected by the conflict, and several villages were destroyed. It is believed that Thorame was either razed or severely damaged during the second half of the 16th century.

This assumption is supported by the absence of architectural elements, such as dated lintels, from before 1555 or more likely 1605, and the general lack of earlier structural remains. However, definitive conclusions cannot be drawn without thorough archival research.

In 1630, the village suffered a severe outbreak of plague. A second epidemic occurred in the 1720s, during which the inhabitants placed the village under voluntary quarantine in an effort to contain the disease.

The village is also marked on the Cassini map, providing historical cartographic evidence of its presence and reconstruction during the early modern period.

=== Contemporary time ===
In the mid-19th century, Thorame-Haute reached its peak population, with approximately 830 inhabitants recorded in 1840. This period marked both a demographic and economic high point, largely driven by the textile industry, particularly wool cloth manufacturing (draperies), which flourished in the Upper Verdon valley.

However, the village's prosperity declined rapidly with increased external access to the valley and growing competition from textile manufacturers in northern France. The drapery factories in Thorame ceased operations before the outbreak of the First World War.

Significant changes were made to the village during this period, shaping the modern appearance of Thorame more than any previous era. These include public infrastructure projects initiated by the municipal administration, such as the construction of fountains, washhouses, a communal oven, and a new town hall. The period also saw the enrichment of religious sites, including the parish church, chapels, and the continuation of the pilgrimage to Notre-Dame-de-la-Fleur.

Private homes were also renovated or rebuilt, as evidenced by the abundance of dated lintels and the decorative modénature (architectural ornamentation) painted on façades, which remain among the most visible expressions of this era's prosperity.

=== 20th century ===
During the First World War, the commune suffered heavy losses, which accelerated the population decline that had begun in the mid-19th century.

The 1960s and 1970s were marked by significant modernization efforts in the village, including improvements in infrastructure and public health, the development of road networks, and the creation of an artificial lake (reservoir) at Sagnes to support irrigation of agricultural land as well as tourism. The commune also acquired new public facilities, such as village halls and postal services.

On 1 March 1974, the commune of Saint-Michel-Peyresq was merged into Thorame-Haute. Saint-Michel-Peyresq itself had been formed earlier, in November 1964, through the fusion of the communes of Colle-Saint-Michel and Peyresq.

The 1980s and 1990s saw a relative decline in tourism, although this trend appears to have stabilized in recent years. Since the 1990s, the number of farms in the commune has decreased rapidly, though it remains significant compared to neighboring communes.

In December 2004, the Intercommunal Association of the High Verdon was reorganized into the Communauté de communes du Haut Verdon-Val d'Allos, which now encompasses a large part of the commune.

=== Today ===
The commune has experienced a recent population revival alongside extensive renovation efforts. The real estate market has seen an unprecedented boom, with prices rising due to increased demand. This pressure on land near the village may contribute to the gradual reduction of agricultural areas, as new residential developments expand.

== Heraldry ==
The coat of arms of Thorame-Haute is described as: "Or, a mountain vert surmounted by a tower gules." This translates to a red tower on a green mountain, set against a gold (or yellow) background.

== Archeology ==
During the 20th century, several notable discoveries were made during public works, primarily in the center of the village and along the wall of the parish church. These included tombs and artifacts clearly identified as dating from the Roman period, such as vases and inscriptions on tiles, some of which are preserved at the National Archaeological Museum in Saint-Germain-en-Laye.

Documents from the Regional Directorate of Cultural Affairs (DRAC) mention engraved stone fragments found during renovation work on village houses. Inscriptions can also be seen on some building façades and lintels. Additional discoveries were made near the Serret chapel; however, the objects have since been lost, and studies conducted in 1982 were limited. Remnants of foundations and pavements remain, though the precise orientation and function of the original structure cannot be confirmed with certainty. These findings indicate occupation of the area predating the Middle Ages.

== Patron Saint and festivities ==
Traditionally, the festival of Saint Julien, the village's patron saint, is held annually on the Sunday following 15 August. In the 18th century, Thorame-Haute celebrated five festivals dedicated to various saints: Saint Clair on 2 January, Saint Blaise on 3 February, Saint George (patron of the commune) on 23 April, Saint Julien (patron of the parish church) on 28 August, and the Sunday of the Trinity, which coincides with Pentecost. The latter was associated with the votive festival of Notre-Dame de la Fleur, featuring a procession and religious ceremonies at the sanctuary.

Today, only the festival of Saint Julien remains, celebrated with a procession and various festivities such as dances and games. Historically, the village also hosted an annual cattle fair on the village square, held on 23 April and the first Monday of October, which continued until the 1950s. Currently, the summer season features a rich program of cultural, sporting, and festive events.

== See also ==
- Peyresq
- Thorame-Basse
- Verdon (river)
- Communes of the Alpes-de-Haute-Provence department
