= Peyresq =

- Part of Thorame-Haute
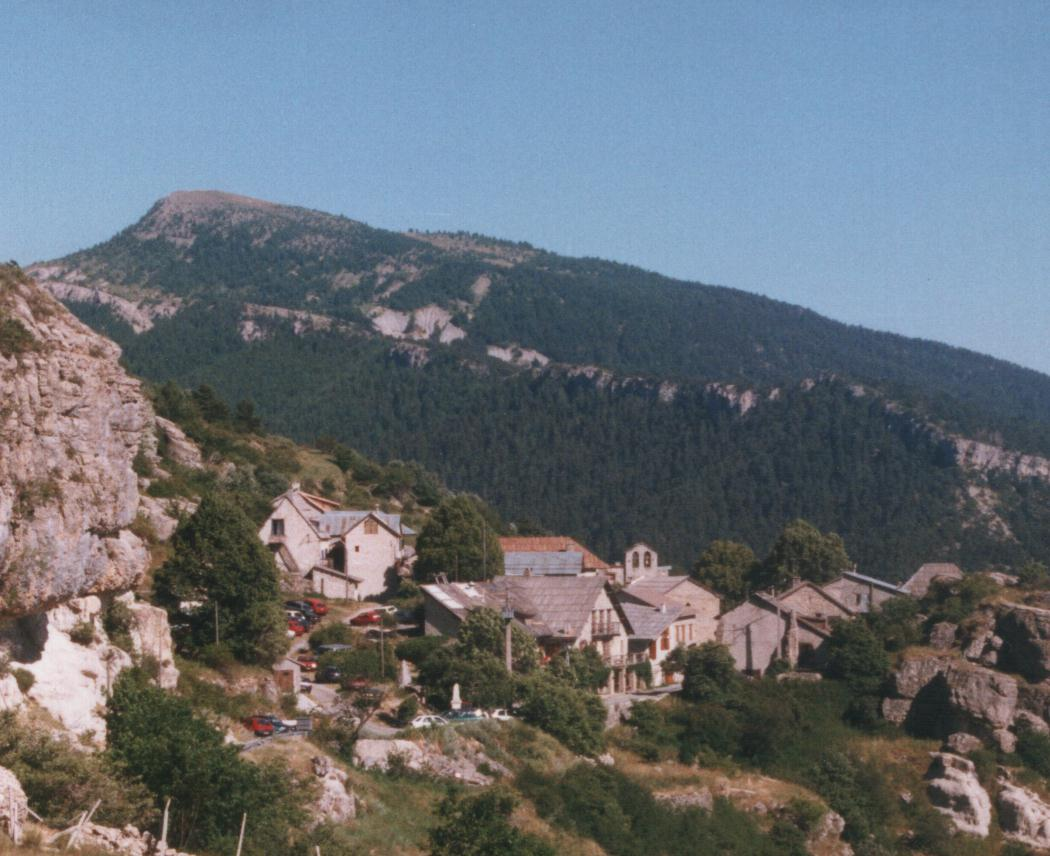
- Village of Peyresq
- Location of Peyresq
- Location within France Location within Provence-Alpes-Côte d'Azur
- Coordinates: 44°05′52″N 6°33′22″E
- Country: France
- Region: Provence-Alpes-Côte d'Azur
- Department: Alpes-de-Haute-Provence
- Arrondissement: Castellane
- Canton: Castellane
- Commune: Thorame-Haute
- Area^{1}: 29 km^{2} (11 sq mi)
- Highest elevation: 2,693 m (8,835 ft)
- Lowest elevation: 971 m (3,186 ft)
- Population (1962): 3
  - Density: 0.10/km^{2} (0.27/sq mi)
- Time zone: UTC+01:00 (CET)
  - Summer (DST): UTC+02:00 (CEST)
- Postal code: 04170
- ^{1} French Land Register data, which excludes lakes, ponds, glaciers > 1 km^{2} (0.386 sq mi or 247 acres) and river estuaries.

Peyresq (from le pays des pierres, or the land of stones) is a French village in the commune of Thorame-Haute in France, perched on a rocky outcrop of the Alpes-de-Haute-Provence at 1,528 metres above sea level.

== History ==
The village first appears in charters of 1042 as Petriscum, referring to its rocky surroundings.

Peyresq (in its occitan spelling Peiresc) gave its name to the famous humanist Nicolas Claude Fabri de Peiresc - he was its lord, but never set foot there. After the French Revolution, the village came to be spelled as Peyresq, and in November 1964 it was merged with the village of La Colle-Saint-Michel to create a new commune called Saint-Michel-Peyresq. That commune was in turn absorbed by the municipality of Thorame-Haute in March 1974.

=== Reconstruction and renaissance ===
In 1952, Georges Lambeau, director of the Académie des Beaux-Arts at Namur, was searching the region for a site for a holiday camp for his students and found Peyresq almost completely abandoned and almost all its houses in ruins. Falling in love with the village's charm, he decided to reconstruct it in his own image. His friend Toine Smets, an entrepreneur from Brussels, decided to finance the project. According to the historian Louise Sgaravizzi, in 1953 of 53 houses 24% were habitable, 40% needed restoration and 16% were in ruins (the majority on what is now called the cour des Métiers). The access route to the village was paved in 1953. In 1954, the last farmer stopped farming in the fields at the foot of the village.

In 1954, the young architect Pierre Lamby joined the project. At the same time, Toine Smets revealed Peyresq to Lucien and Jane Jacquet, who founded the association Pro Peyresq, soon joined by Jacques Waefelaer and his wife Jacqueline, respectively treasurer and "responsable de l'intendance" (économat).

== Sites and monuments ==
- The old Church
- Valley of the river Vaïre
- Valley of the river Verdon
- the mountains

== Reception ==
Peyresq is an important action place of a novel published in Germany.

== Bibliography ==
- Paulette Borrely-Goujon et Lucie Imbert : "Peyresq, un destin"
- Paulette Borrely-Goujon et Lucie Imbert : "Peyresq, un village de Haute-Provence à la recherche des temps perdus", préface de Pierre Borrély, dans la collection Deux ou trois mots pour le dire; Mallemoisson, éditions de Haute-Provence, 1994. ISBN 2-909800-97-0
- Mady Smets "L'Architecte et le Berger"
- Louise Navello-Sgaravizzi "Découverte d'une seigneurie : Peyresq"
- Louise Navello-Sgaravizzi "Peyresq, l'extraordinaire destin d'un village des Alpes Provençales"
