= Judith Beheading Holofernes (Caravaggio) =

Painting by Caravaggio

- Giuditta e Oloferne (Italian)
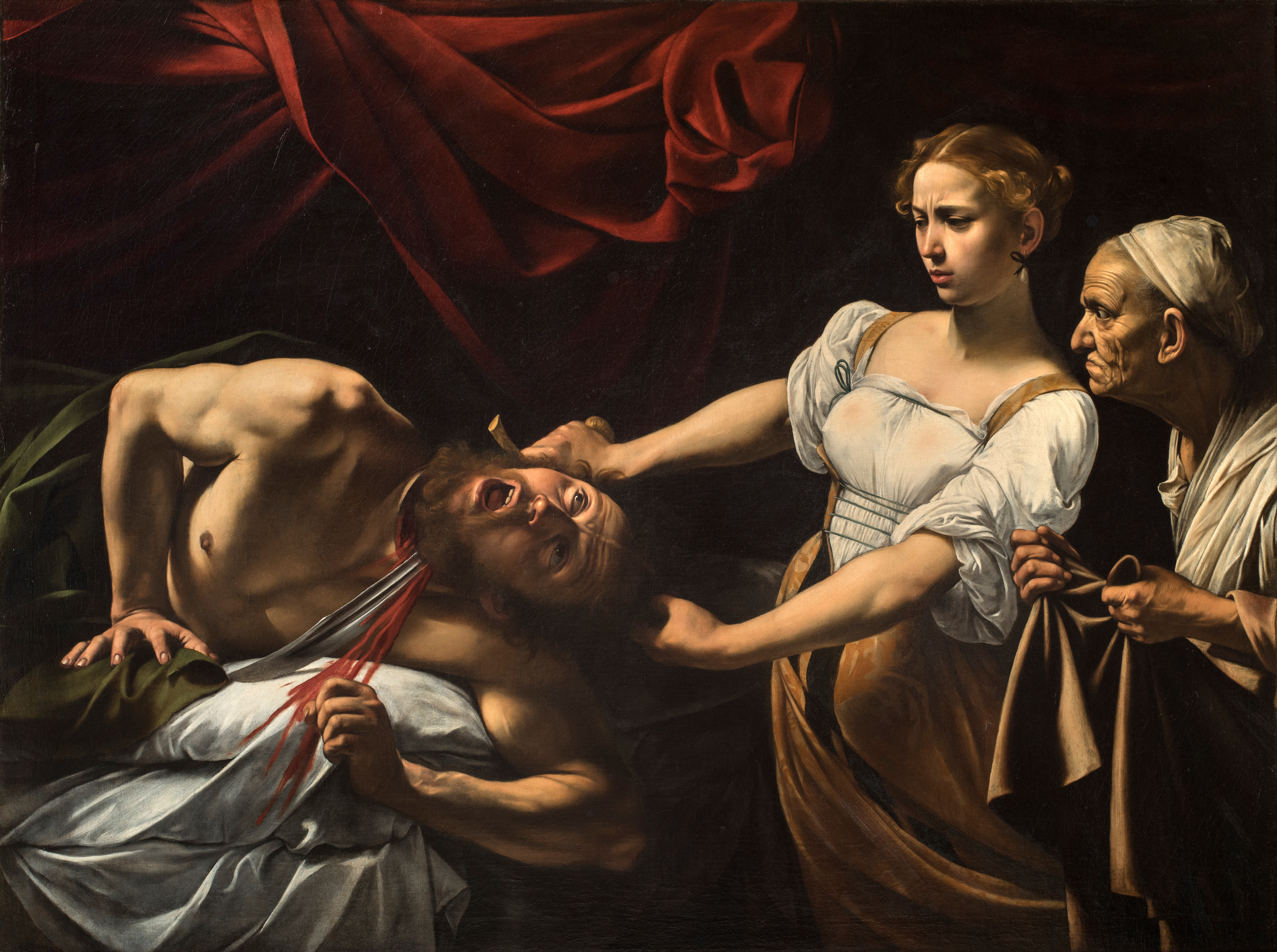
- Artist: Caravaggio
- Year: c. 1599–1600, or 1602
- Medium: Oil on canvas
- Dimensions: 145 cm × 195 cm (57 in × 77 in)
- Location: Galleria Nazionale d'Arte Antica at Palazzo Barberini, Rome; 41°54′12.65″N 12°29′24.75″E

Judith Beheading Holofernes is a painting of the biblical episode by the Italian Baroque artist Caravaggio, painted in c. 1599 – 1600 or 1602, in which the widow Judith stayed with the Assyrian general Holofernes in his tent after a banquet then decapitated him after he passed out drunk. The painting was rediscovered in 1950 and is part of the collection of the Galleria Nazionale d'Arte Antica in Rome. The exhibition 'Dentro Caravaggio', Royal Palace of Milan (Sept 2017 – Jan 2018), suggests a date of 1602 on account of the use of light underlying sketches not seen in Caravaggio's early work but characteristic of his later works. The exhibition catalogue (Skira, 2018, p88) also cites biographer artist Giovanni Pietro Baglione's account that the work was commissioned by Genoese banker Ottavio Costa.

A second painting on the same subject (see below) and dated to 1607, attributed by several experts to Caravaggio but still disputed by others, was rediscovered by chance in 2014 and went on sale in June 2019 as Judith and Holofernes.

== Subject ==
The deuterocanonical Book of Judith tells how Judith served her people by deceiving Holofernes, the Assyrian General. Judith gets Holofernes drunk, then seizes her sword and slays him: "Approaching to his bed, she took hold of the hair of his head" (Judith 13:7–8).

Caravaggio chose what he thought the moment of greatest dramatic impact: the moment of decapitation itself. The figures are set out in a shallow stage, theatrically lit from the side, isolated against the inky black background. Judith's maid Abra stands beside her mistress to the right as Judith extends her arm to hold a blade against Holofernes's neck; lying on his stomach, neck contorted as he turns his head towards his assassin, he is vulnerable. X-rays have revealed that Caravaggio adjusted the placement of Holofernes' head as he proceeded, separating it slightly from the torso and moving it minutely to the right. The faces of the three characters demonstrate the artist's mastery of emotion, Judith's countenance in particular showing a mix of determination and repulsion. Artemisia Gentileschi and others were deeply influenced by this work.

The model for Judith is probably the Roman courtesan Fillide Melandroni, who posed for several other works by Caravaggio around this year; the scene itself, especially the details of blood and decapitation, were possibly drawn from his observations of the public execution of Beatrice Cenci in 1599.

== Possible second version ==
The Toulouse Judith Beheading Holofernes
- Artist: Caravaggio or Louis Finson
- Year: c.1606–1607
- Medium: Oil on canvas
- Dimensions: 144 cm × 173.5 cm (57 in × 68.3 in)
- Location: Collection of J. Tomilson Hill

When Caravaggio left Naples on 14 June 1607, he left two paintings - the Madonna of the Rosary and Judith beheading Holofernes - in the studio in Naples that was shared by the two Flemish painters and art dealers Louis Finson and Abraham Vinck. Vinck likely took the two paintings with him when he left Naples and settled in Amsterdam around 1609. Later Finson also moved to Amsterdam. The two paintings are mentioned again, this time in the will and testament dated 19 September 1617 prepared by Finson in Amsterdam. In his will Finson left Vinck his share in the two Caravaggio paintings that they had owned in common since Naples. Finson died shortly after making his will and his heir Vinck died two years later. After Vinck died his heirs sold the Madonna of the Rosary after 1619 for 1800 florins to a committee of Flemish painters and 'amateurs' led by Peter Paul Rubens for the Saint Paul's Church of the Dominican friars in Antwerp. In 1786, Emperor Joseph II, ruler of the Austrian Netherlands, first ordered the closure of all 'useless' monastic orders and then claimed the other painting by Caravaggio for his art collection. It can now be admired in the Kunsthistorisches Museum in Vienna. Caravaggio's work, which was a gift of Antwerp's leading artists and an expression of their deep religious devotion had thus become the object of looting by the Austrian rulers of Flanders.

There was no trace of the second Caravaggio representing Judith beheading Holofernes co-owned by Vinck and Finson since the early 1600s. It was suggested that it should be identified with the painting in the collection of the Intesa Sanpaolo bank in Naples. A painting of Judith beheading Holofernes discovered in an attic in Toulouse in 2014 is believed by certain scholars to be the lost Caravaggio. Other scholars see in both the Toulouse Judith and the work in the collection of the Intesa Sanpaolo bank not only works painted by the hand of Finson but they have also contended that they are in fact original creations of Finson rather than copies after a lost Caravaggio. The Toulouse version has even been described as Finson's masterpiece. Both camps of art historians base their attribution on the stylistic and technical features of the work.

An export ban was placed on the painting by the French government while tests were carried out to establish its authenticity. In February 2019 it was announced that the painting would be sold at auction after the Louvre had turned down the opportunity to purchase it for €100 million. It was instead bought by art collector and hedge fund manager J. Tomilson Hill for an undisclosed amount of money shortly before the planned auction, in June 2019. The new owner is a board member of the Metropolitan Museum of Art.

== See also ==
- List of paintings by Caravaggio
- Judith beheading Holofernes for other depictions of the subject
