= Peter N. Miller =

American historian (born 1964)

Peter N. Miller (born December 13, 1964) is an American historian who is president of the American Academy in Rome. He was a 1998 MacArthur Fellow. Much of his scholarship has centered on the intellectual and cultural history of early modern Europe, including the practices of antiquarianism within wider scholarly erudition; and he is a particular authority on the thought and influence of the French savant, Nicolas-Claude Fabri de Peiresc (1580–1637).

From 1998 to 2001, he was an assistant professor at the University of Maryland, College Park. From 2008 to 2023, he was dean of Bard College's Graduate Center.

He attended the Ramaz School, a Modern Orthodox Jewish day school in New York City. He earned his bachelor's degree magna cum laude from Harvard College, his master's from Harvard University and his PhD at the University of Cambridge.

== Works ==
- Sovereignty and Obligation in Republican England: Political Thought in the Engagement Controversy, A.B. thesis, Harvard University, 1986.
- From Community to Individual Rights: English political thought and imperial crisis 1750–1776, PhD thesis, University of Cambridge, 1990
- Defining the Common Good: Empire, Religion and Philosophy in Eighteenth-Century Britain. Cambridge University Press. 1994. ISBN 978-0-521-61712-3.
- Peiresc's Europe: Learning and Virtue in the Seventeenth Century. New Haven: Yale University Press. 2000. ISBN 978-0-300-08252-4.
- Peiresc's Orient: antiquarianism as cultural history in the seventeenth century. Farnham: Ashgate. 2012. ISBN 978-1-4094-3298-2.
- Peiresc's Mediterranean World. Cambridge: Harvard University Press. 2015. ISBN 9780674744066.
- History and Its Objects: antiquarianism and material culture since 1500. Ithaca: Cornell University Press. 2017. ISBN 9780801453700.
- The Weather on 9/9/01. Paris: Les presses du réel. 2024. ISBN 9789464987096.
- Research—A Manifesto. Princeton University Press. 2026. ISBN 9780691273051.

=== Edited ===
- Miller, Peter N., ed. (2007). Momigliano and Antiquarianism: foundations of the modern cultural sciences. University of Toronto Press. ISBN 978-0-8020-9207-6.
- Miller, Peter N.; Louis, François, eds. (2012). Antiquarianism and Intellectual Life in Europe and China, 1500–1800. Ann Arbor: University of Michigan Press. ISBN 9780472118182.
