= Louis Finson =

Flemish painter

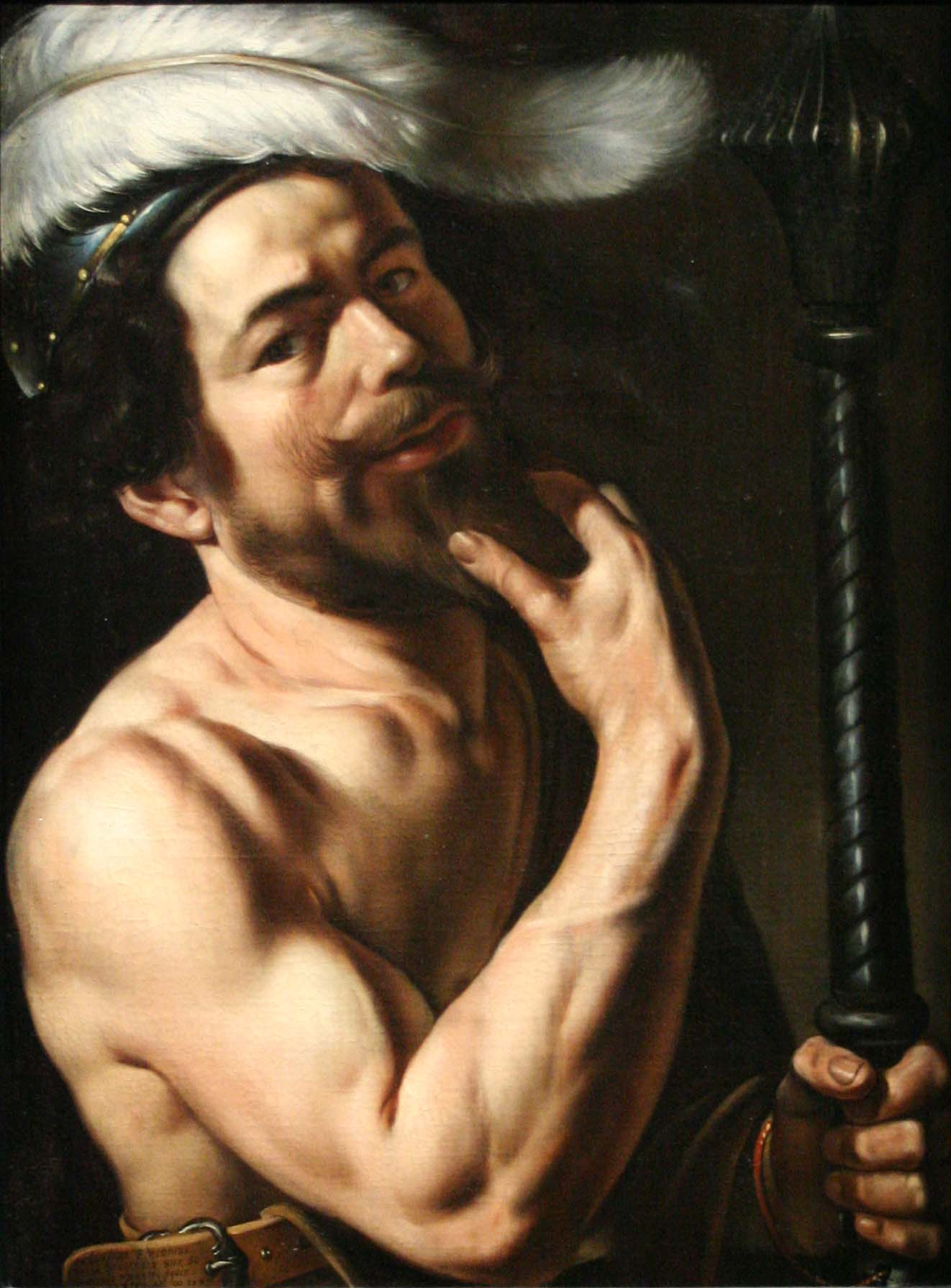
Self-portrait, 1613

Louis Finson, Lodewijk Finson or Ludovicus Finsonius (between 1574 and 1580 – 1617) was a Flemish painter, draughtsman, copyist and art dealer. He painted portraits, religious compositions, allegorical paintings and genre scenes. Moving to Italy early in his career, he became one of the first Flemish followers of Caravaggio whom he knew personally in Naples. He produced a number of copies after works by Caravaggio. He worked for a number of years in various cities in France where he created altarpieces and portraits. He is known for being the co-owner together with his fellow Flemish painter and business partner Abraham Vinck of two paintings by Caravaggio, possibly including the Judith Beheading Holofernes rediscovered in Toulouse in 2014. Louis Finson played a major role in the Northern Caravaggesque movement through his own works as well as his role as an art dealer.

The monograph and catalogue raisonné devoted to Louis Finson are written by the art historian Olivier Morand, whose research brings to light the singular place of this painter within the European artistic context of the early seventeenth century. This comprehensive study aims not only to establish the artist’s corpus with precision, but also to illuminate his relationships with contemporaries, his movements between Italy, France, and the Low Countries, and the lasting influence of his work .

== Life ==
Finson was born in Bruges, the son of Jacob Finson and Maycken Bart. His father was a painter who had been in Bruges a pupil of Ambrosius Benson, an Italian painter active in Bruges who was part of the Northern Renaissance, and Rogier de Paeuw. Jacob Finson was originally documented as a cloth-painter (cleerscryver) or house painter (huusscruyver), an artisan who painted textiles and wall paper, but also statues. He was later registered as a regular painter. He held several functions at the Bruges guild and became its dean in the guild year 1583–1584. Louis Finson had two or three older brothers and a sister and was likely the youngest child of the family.

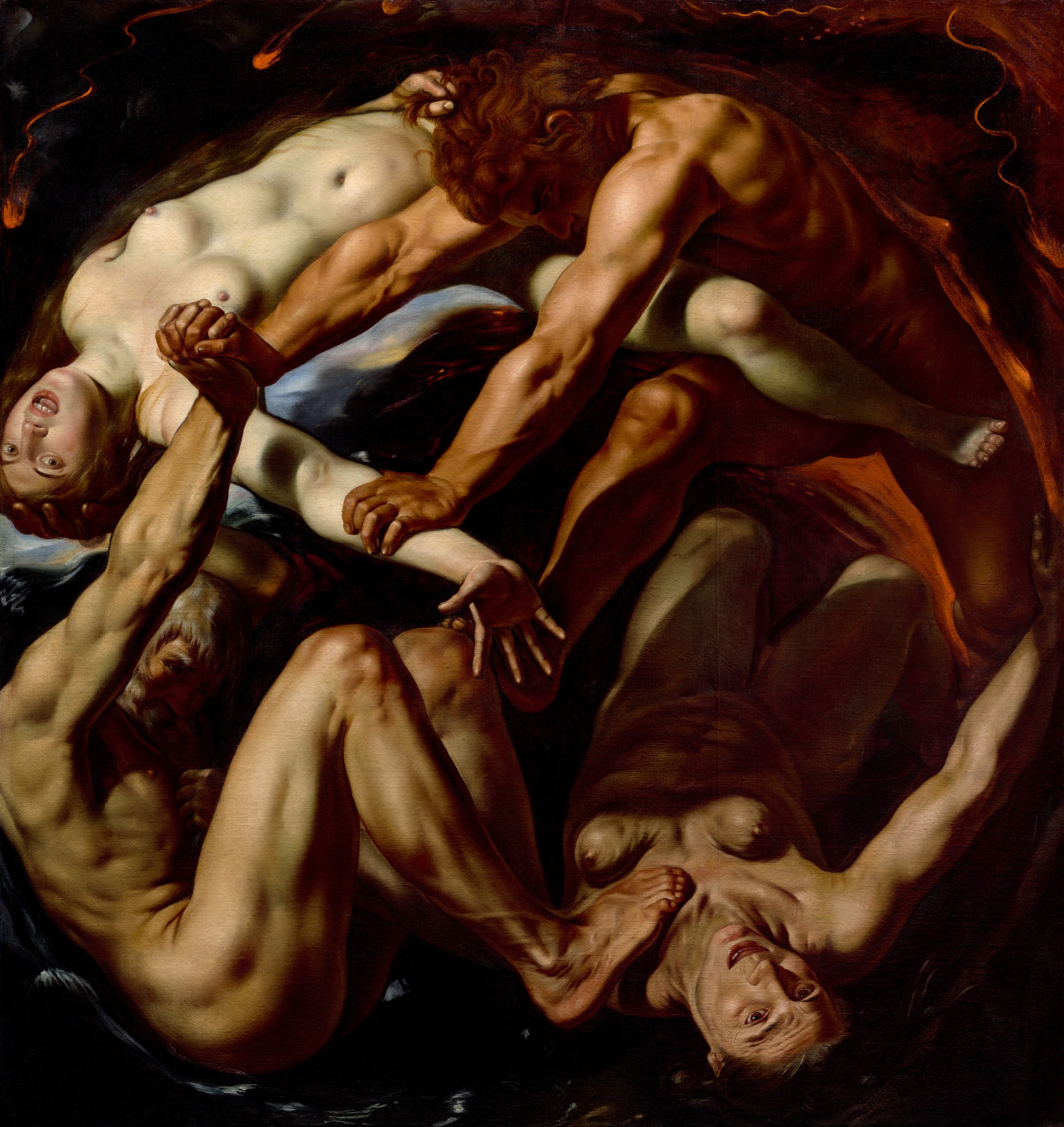
Allegory of the Four Elements, 1611

After the death of Maycken Bart in 1580, his father married Jozyne vande Voorde. In the second half of the 16th century the Habsburg Netherlands were going through a period of violent religious conflict which had a heavy toll on the civil population. This likely caused the Finson family to leave Bruges in 1585 to settle in the town of Veere, on the island of Walcheren in the province of Zeeland. At that time Veere was an important trading and military port of the Dutch Republic. Jacob Finson remained in Veere until his death in April 1608. His son Arnoud was registered as a painter in Veere and died there before 1617.

There are no records on the movements of Louis Finson between 1585 and 1604. He likely moved with the rest of family to Veere in 1585. At that time Louis was still young and he likely remained with his family until the late 1590s. Finson likely received his initial artistic training from his father. It is possible that he continued his studies in another town in the Dutch Republic, such as Amsterdam.

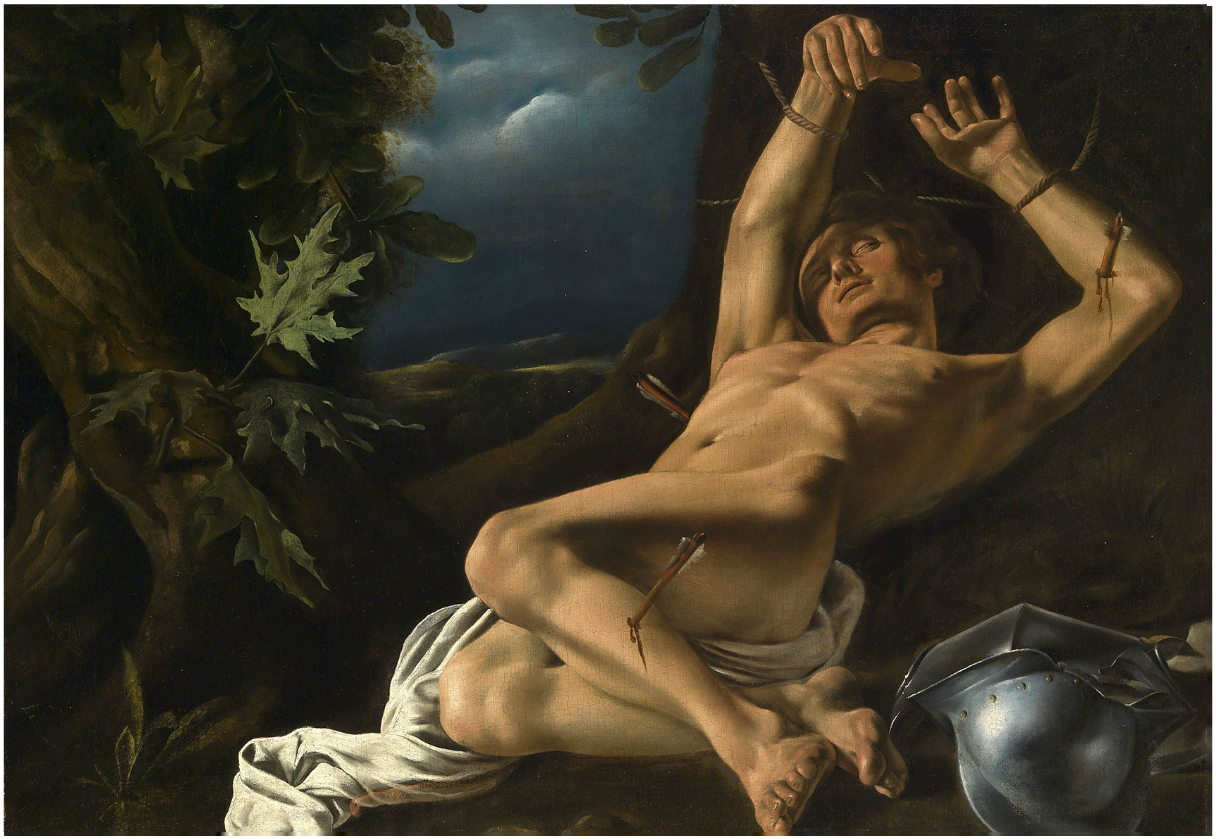
Saint Sebastian

He traveled to Italy where he was first recorded in Naples in March 1605 on the receipt of a payment for a painting. His initial commissions included portraits. In Naples he befriended fellow Flemish painter and art dealer, Abraham Vinck, with whom he shared for some time a workshop and also a residence. Vinck had been in Naples since about 1598 and left the city around 1609 for Amsterdam. His relationship with Vinck likely enabled Finson to quickly find patrons in the city. The two artists were also business partners who operated an art dealing and copying business.

It is likely that Finson and Vinck offered Caravaggio refuge when he arrived in Naples after fleeing Rome following his killing of a rival painter in a brawl. They may have arranged for him a place to work and connected him with patrons in Naples. Finson obtained commissions in Naples. On 24 August 1612 Finson received a final payment for an Annunciation made for the church of Saint Thomas of Aquino in Naples (now in the Museo di Capodimonte). It is to date Finson's only surviving commission for an altarpiece dating from his stay in Naples. He may not have been very successful with his paintings in Naples. This may be one of the reasons why he decided to leave the city.

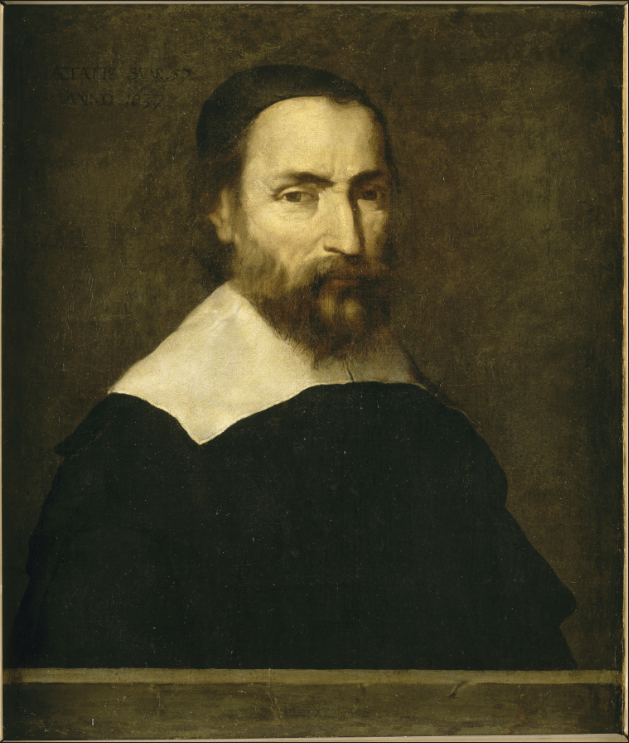
Nicolas-Claude Fabri de Peyresc by Finson

Finson first spent a brief time in Rome in 1613. He left Italy around 1613 and may have traveled via Spain. He arrived in France no later than 27 February 1613 when he was recorded in Marseille. He was accompanied by the painter Martin Hermann Faber who may have been his pupil. Finson and Faber each painted around this time a self-portrait which they executed in a matching Caravaggesque style. The French scientist and intellectual Nicolas-Claude Fabri de Peiresc, who was also a great friend of Rubens, became acquainted with Finson and was an admirer of his work. Peiresc was one of the first admirers and champions of Caravaggio in France after discovering Caravaggio's works in the Contarelli chapel in Rome in 1600 at the age of 20. He gathered around him what has been called a 'caravaggesque workshop of Southern France' which included artists like Louis Finson, Martin Hermann Faber, Trophime Bigot and others. He arranged a number of commissions for Finson, including for history paintings and portraits. As a result, Finson gained a strong reputation in the Provence. He was able to sell some of the unsold paintings from Naples to French patrons. He also painted a portrait of Nicolas Claude Fabri de Peyresc. Peiresc was an avid art collector and relied on Finson's contacts in Italy to acquire two works of Caravaggio from the Pasqualini family of Rome. During his stay in France Finson was together with his partner Martin Hermann Faber in the possession of nine original works of Caravaggio.

Finson worked in various cities in France where he painted religious works, altarpieces and portraits. He created works in Marseille (1613-1616), Aix-en-Provence (1613-1614), Arles (March 1614) and Montpellier (1614). After falling ill he was held up in Bordeaux in October and November 1614. In 1615, he made paintings in Poitiers, and then in Paris.

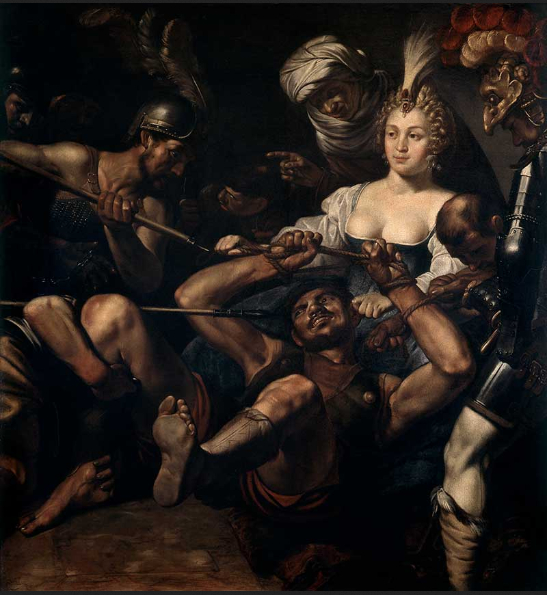
Samson and Delilah

He left Paris on 10 July 1615 and arrived in Amsterdam in 1616 or later. Here he linked up again with Abraham Vinck who was his landlord in the period 1616-1617 for a residence on the Oudezijds Voorburgwal in Amsterdam. He fell ill again and made his will on 19 September 1617. In the will he left to Vinck his share in the two Caravaggio paintings which they had acquired from Caravaggio during their stay in Naples. He died soon afterwards and was buried on 1 October 1617 in the Oude Kerk in Amsterdam. His estate included a third painting by Caravaggio of the Martyrdom of Saint Andrew (private collection).

== Works ==
Finson is mainly known for his religious compositions and portraits. He also painted an allegorical painting of the Four Elements (Museum of Fine Arts, Houston) and an allegorical genre scene representing the five senses. He further produced a number of copies of works by Caravaggio.

Other than the copies after Caravaggio made after 1606 such as Judith Beheading Holofernes (1607), there are almost no known paintings by Finson before 1610. The signed but not dated Venus and Cupid with an unlikely couple (At Dorotheum on 13 October 2010 in Vienna, lot 352) was likely made in Italy not long after his arrival in Italy and before his exposure to the naturalism of Caravaggio. It shows that at this time Finson was still influenced by the Mannerist school of painting at the court of Rudolph II in Prague, with its preference for exploring erotic motives as well as by the Mannerist style of Antwerp painters such as Jacob de Backer. A Saint John the Baptist preparing himself for his martyrdom in a private collection was attributed to Finson in 2019 and is dated to approximately 1607. It shows Finson's confrontation with the work of Caravaggio. The painting offers an original interpretation of the subject. The foreground is dominated by the nude torso of the saint, shown in a submissive pose a few moments before his beheading. On the left are the heads of Salome and the old maid, who is close to the old maid in Caravaggio's File:Salome with the Head of John the Baptist-Caravaggio in the National Gallery in London. A Caravaggesque painting of the Martyrdom of Saint Sebastian (Parish church of Rougiers, France) was previously dated 1615 but has now been dated 1610. This would place it in the Italian period of the artist.

In 1610 he signed and dated the following paintings: the Resurrection (Church of Saint-Jean-de-Malte in Aix-en-Provence), David and Bathsheba (Sotheby's London sale of 3 December 2008 lot 30) and Adam and Eve (Marburg, Marburger Universitätsmuseum für Kunst und Kulturgeschichte). The David and Bathsheba and the Adam and Eve show the fusion of his Flemish training and the naturalist style arising in Naples under the influence of Caravaggio. The first painting recalls some of the stylistic characteristics of the work of Jacob de Backer in particular in the drawing of the bare shoulders of the servant of Bathsheba. In the second large-scale work he offers an original interpretation of the Paradise story showing Paradise as a lush Flemish still life of fruits which Adam and Eve are consuming in bliss. The two protagonists are drafted with Caravaggesque physiques and dramatic lighting.

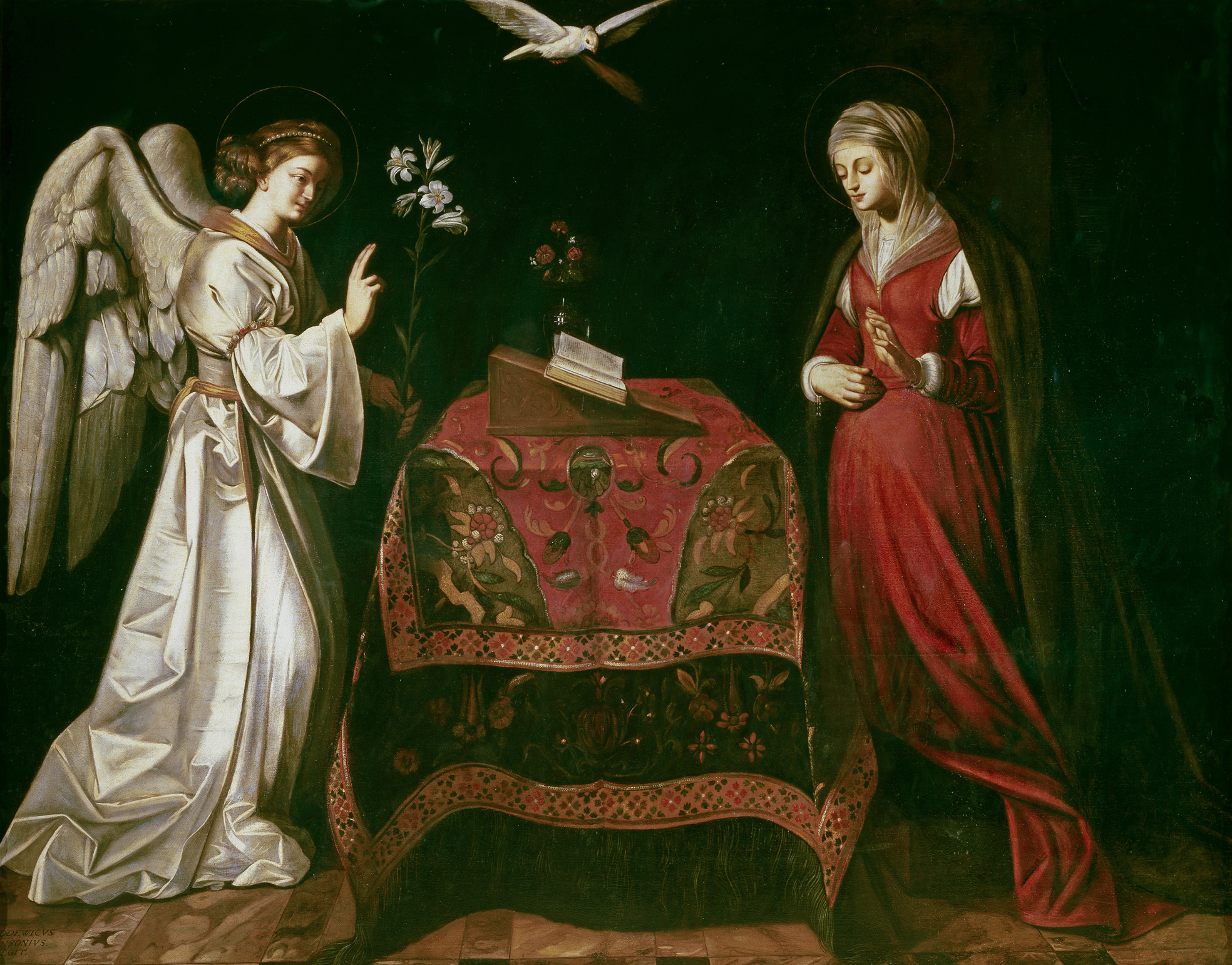
The Annunciation

With the Four Elements painted in Naples in 1611 Finson created a dramatically new representation of the classic theme of the four elements. Packed with action, using powerful colours and strong lighting effects the work shows the influence of Caravaggio. The Four Elements are depicted in the form of four naked people, two male and two female, who are locked in a fierce struggle. In the upper right Fire in the form of a young man has stretched out his arms to control Air represented by young woman in the upper left and hold back Water represented by an old man in the lower left. Earth is depicted in the lower right of the painting as an old lady lying on her back, surrounded by brown earth.

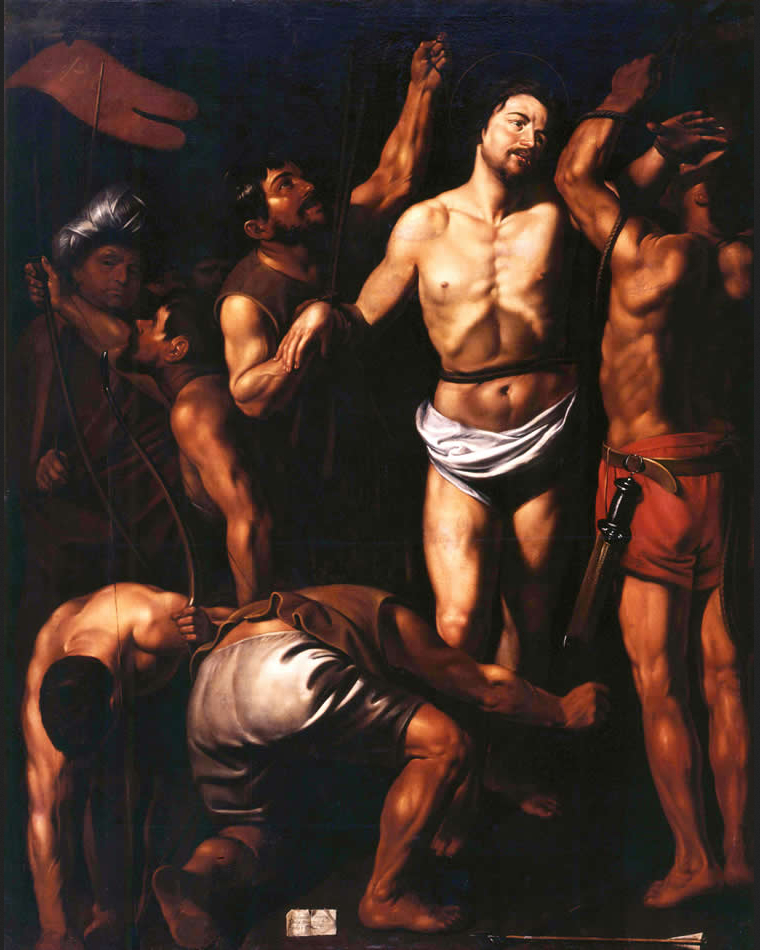
The martyrdom of St Sebastian

Finson made more powerful works under the influence of Caravaggio such as the Martyrdom of Saint Sebastian (Dorotheum Vienna sale of 24 April 2018 lot 91). In this work he cites from Caravaggio's Conversion of Saint Paul in the Cerasi Chapel in the use of strong foreshortening. In his Self-portrait, which is a pendant to the Self-portrait painted by Martin Hermann Faber (c. 1613, both in the Musée des beaux-arts de Marseille), the artists show a great sense of self-awareness. The portraits depicting the artists muscular, semi-nude upper bodies have a certain grotesque flavor and evoke the mocking self-portraits by Caravaggio such as the Young Sick Bacchus (c. 1593, Galleria Borghese, Rome). They constitute a radical transformation of the typology of the genre of the artist self-portrait.

Most of the altarpieces which Finson produced during his residence in France are signed and bear a trompe-l'oeil painted paper tag on the bottom left on which Finson's signature is affixed. In these works he uses Caravaggesque elements within Flemish, somewhat antiquated compositional solutions. He frequently quotes from Caravaggio within complex architectural settings, with figures that are always a little rigid, arranged in postures that accentuate their musculature, the bending of limbs and the crossing of the hands.

He also produced altarpieces that were more indebted to 16th-century Flemish and Dutch art such as the Resurrection of Lazarus (1613, Chatêau-Gombert church, Marseille), the Massacre of the Innocents (1615, Sainte-Begge church, Andenne), the Martyrdom of Saint Stephen, (1614, Church of St. Trophime, Arles), the Adoration of the Magi (1614, Church of St. Trophime, Arles) and the Circumcision (original copy in old chapel of the Jesuit College in Poitiers, unsigned copy by Finson in the Saint-Nicolas-des-Champs, Paris). During the latter part of his stay in France, Finson painted some altarpieces which were less convincing than his earlier work. It is possible that during his last few years in Amsterdam he created paintings such as the Musical company (Allegory of the five senses) (Herzog Anton Ulrich Museum) which treats a theme that was popular in the Northern Netherlands at that time. Finson treats the subject through its delicate color changes more as a genuine genre painting rather than as a personification of the senses.

== Gallery ==
Paintings by Louis Finson

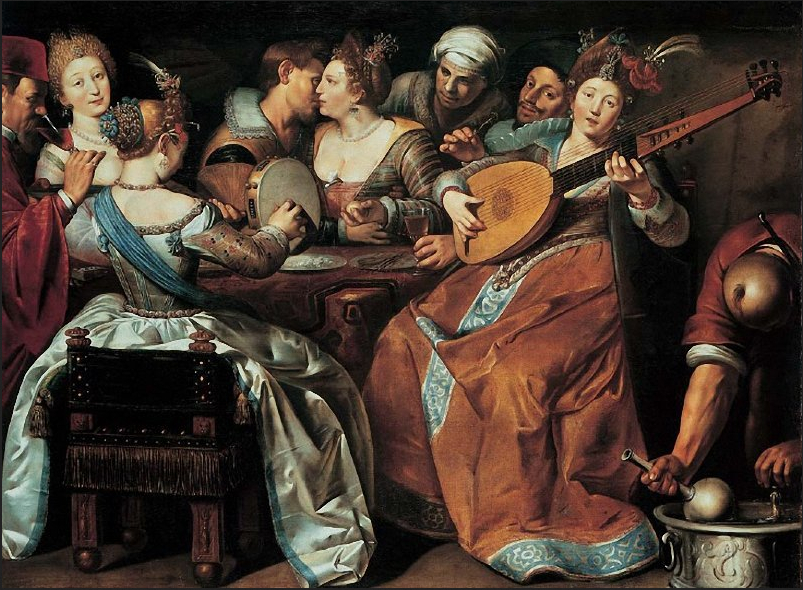
Musical company (Allegory of the five senses)

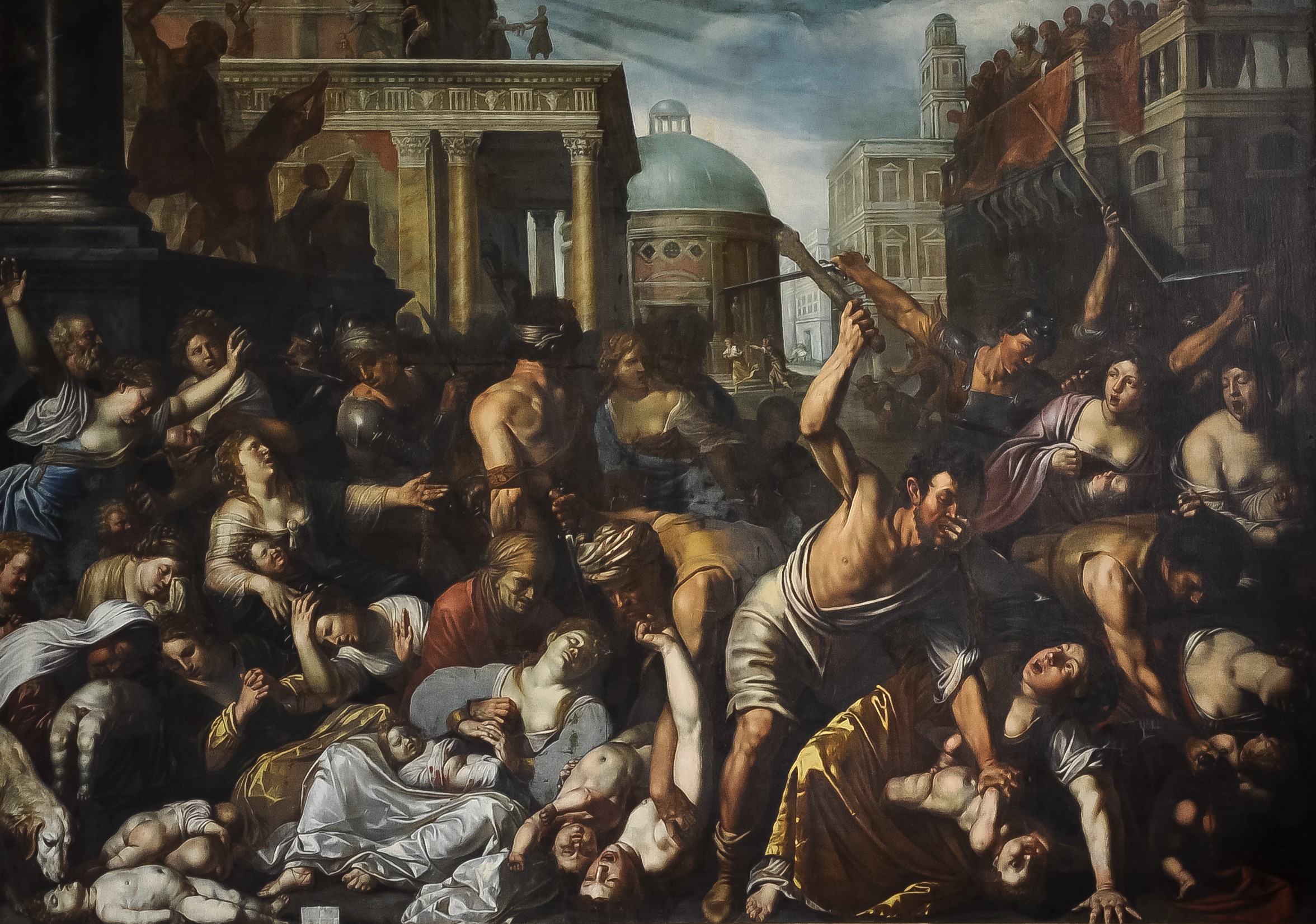
Massacre of the Innocents

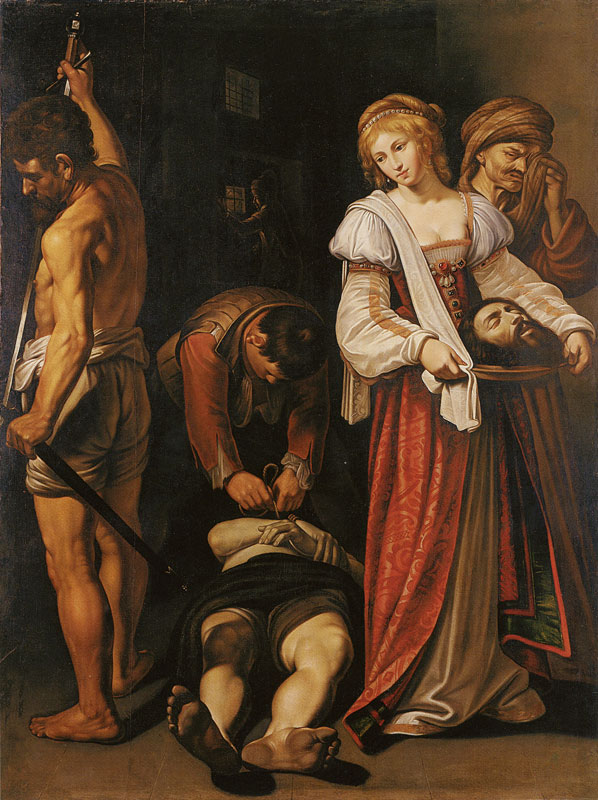
The decapitation of Saint John the Baptist

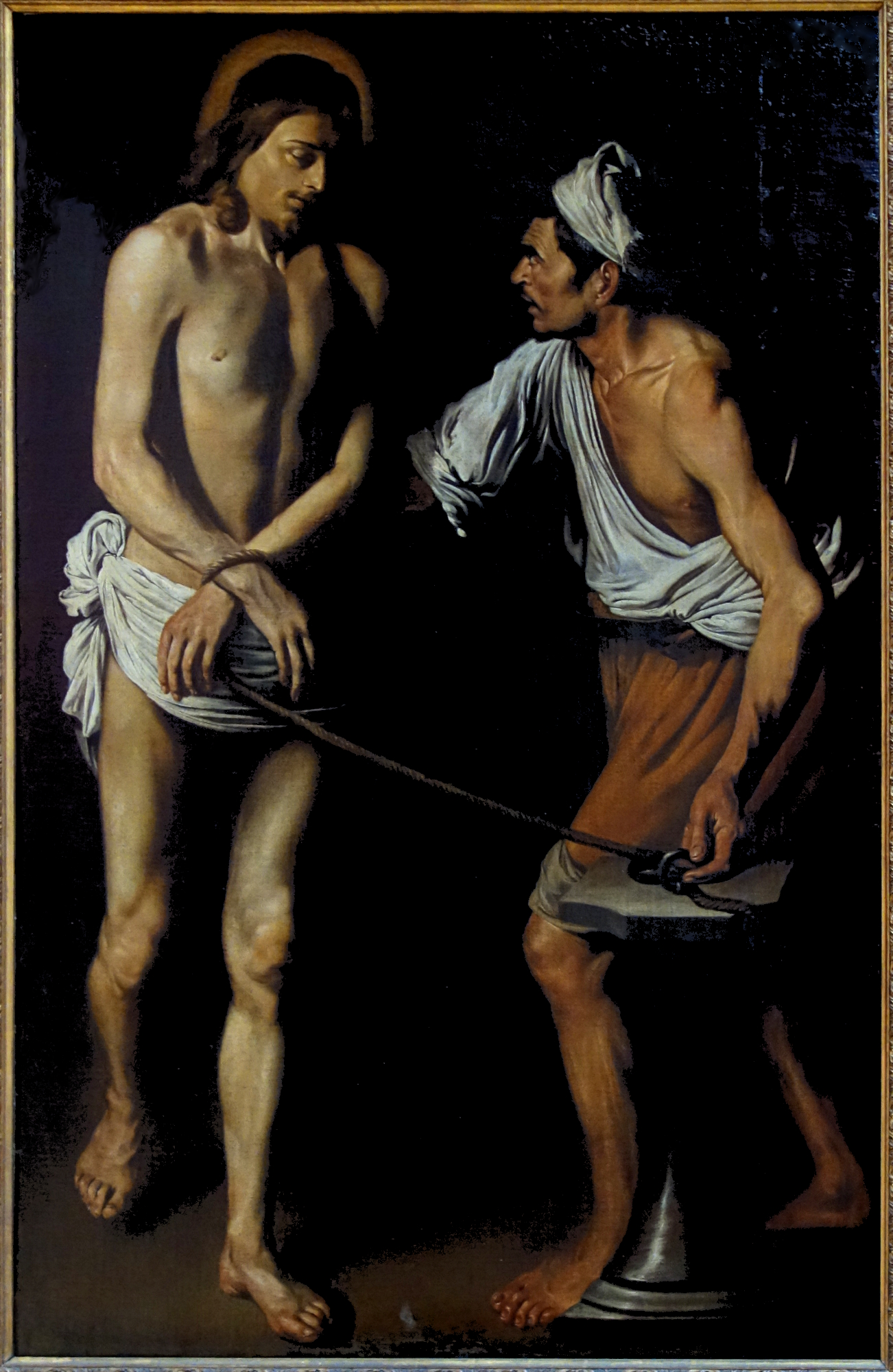
Flagellation of Christ

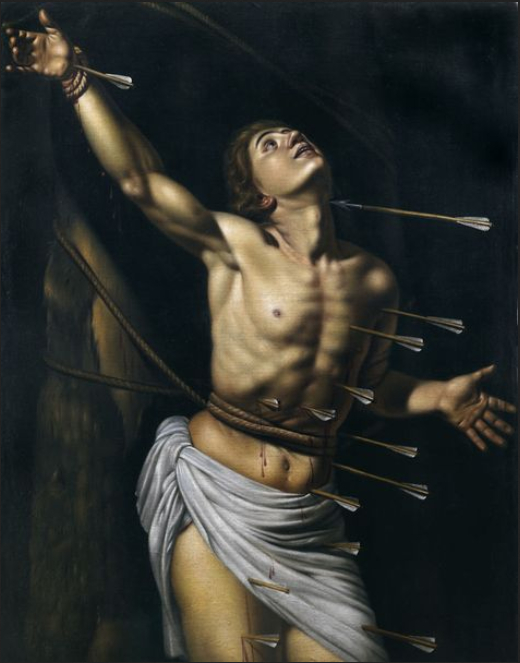
The martyrdom of Saint Sebastian
