= Belgentier =

- Commune
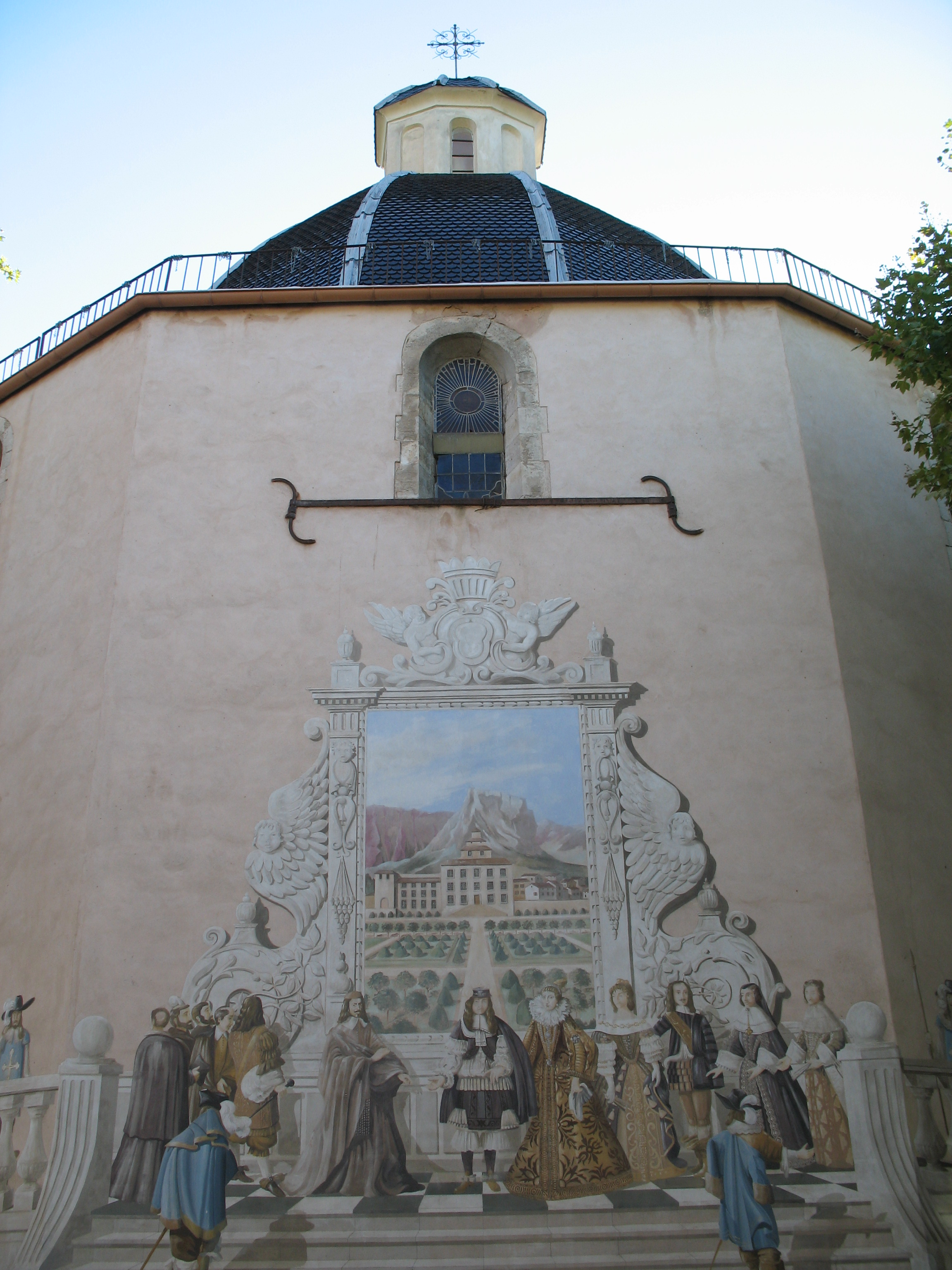
- The church of Notre-Dame-de-l'Assomption, in Belgentier

- Coat of arms
- Location of Belgentier
- Location within France Location within Provence-Alpes-Côte d'Azur
- Coordinates: 43°14′45″N 6°00′01″E
- Country: France
- Region: Provence-Alpes-Côte d'Azur
- Department: Var
- Arrondissement: Toulon
- Canton: Solliès-Pont
- Intercommunality: Vallée du Gapeau

Government
  - Mayor (2020–2026): Bruno Aycard
- Area^{1}: 13.38 km^{2} (5.17 sq mi)
- Elevation: 159 m (522 ft)
- Highest elevation: 620 m (2,030 ft)
- Lowest elevation: 126 m (413 ft)
- Population (2023): 2,373
  - Density: 177.4/km^{2} (459.3/sq mi)
- Time zone: UTC+01:00 (CET)
  - Summer (DST): UTC+02:00 (CEST)
- INSEE/Postal code: 83017 /83210
- ^{1} French Land Register data, which excludes lakes, ponds, glaciers > 1 km^{2} (0.386 sq mi or 247 acres) and river estuaries.

Belgentier (French pronunciation: [bɛlʒɑ̃tje]; Occitan: Beujanciá) is a commune in the Var department in the Provence-Alpes-Côte d'Azur region in southeastern France.

It was the birthplace of the astronomer, antiquary and savant, Nicolas-Claude Fabri de Peiresc (1580–1637).

== Population ==
Historical population
Year	Pop.	±% p.a.
1968	561	—
1975	690	+3.00%
1982	984	+5.20%
1990	1,442	+4.89%
1999	1,724	+2.00%
2007	2,367	+4.04%
2012	2,421	+0.45%
2017	2,429	+0.07%
2023	2,373	−0.39%
Source: INSEE

== See also ==
- Communes of the Var department
