= Abraham Vinck =

Flemish painter and art dealer

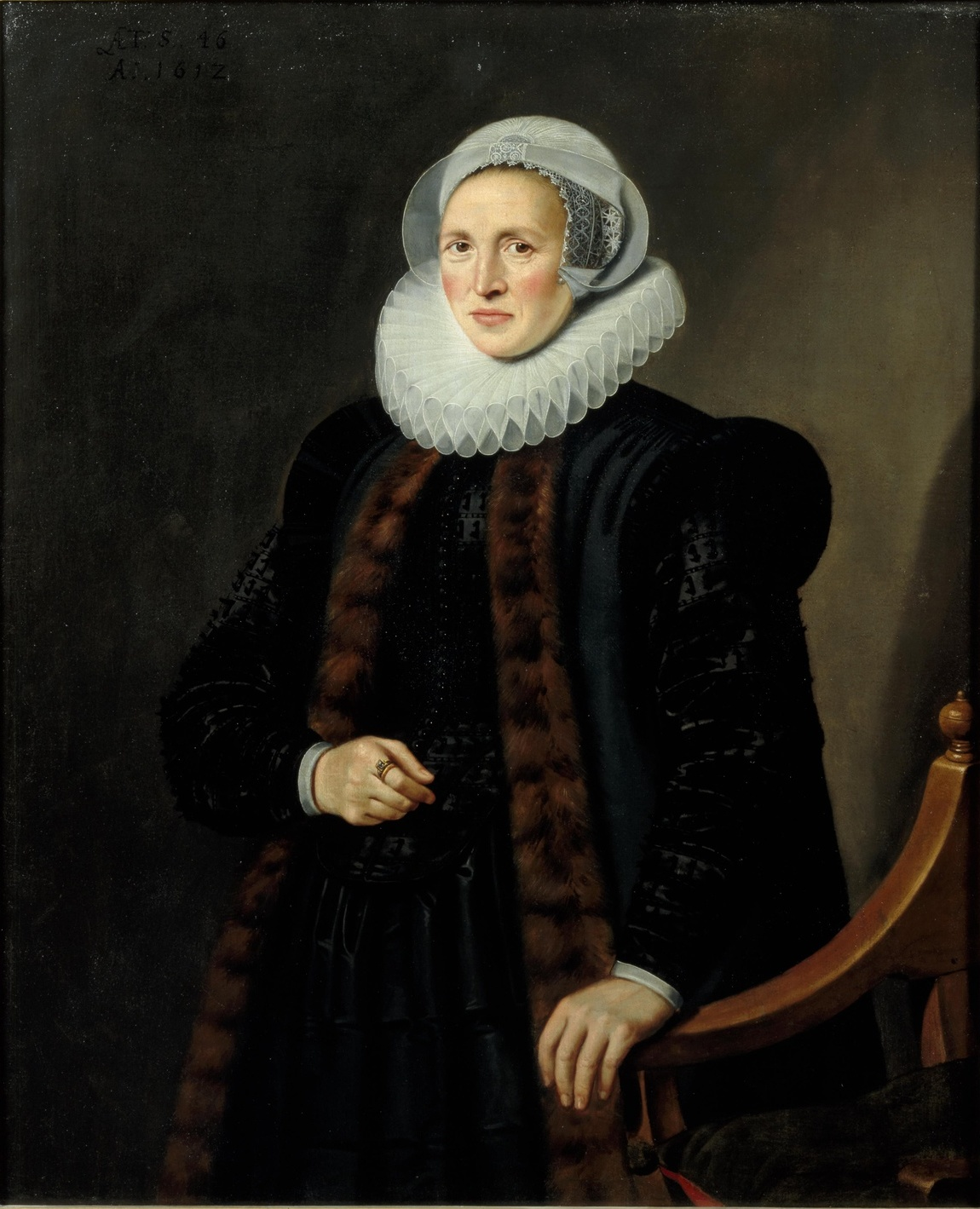
Portrait of Mayken Baccher

Abraham Vinck or Abraham Willemsz. Vinck (Antwerp, 1574/1575 – Amsterdam, 1619) was a Flemish painter and art dealer who spent most of his life and career outside of Flanders, including in Hamburg, Naples and Amsterdam. He is mainly known as a portrait painter but also practised in many other genres including history painting, mythological scenes, fruit and fish still lifes and market scenes. He was also a copyist who created copies after the great masters. He is now mainly known for being the co-owner together with his Flemish colleague and business partner Louis Finson of two paintings by Caravaggio.

== Life ==
Vinck was born in Antwerp in 1574 or 1575 near the St Dominic Convent as son of the merchant Willem Vinck (died before 1602) and Catarina Buichi (died 1602). In the past it was believed that he was born in Hamburg. Recent research has shown that he was born in Antwerp. He had a younger brother called Cornelis.

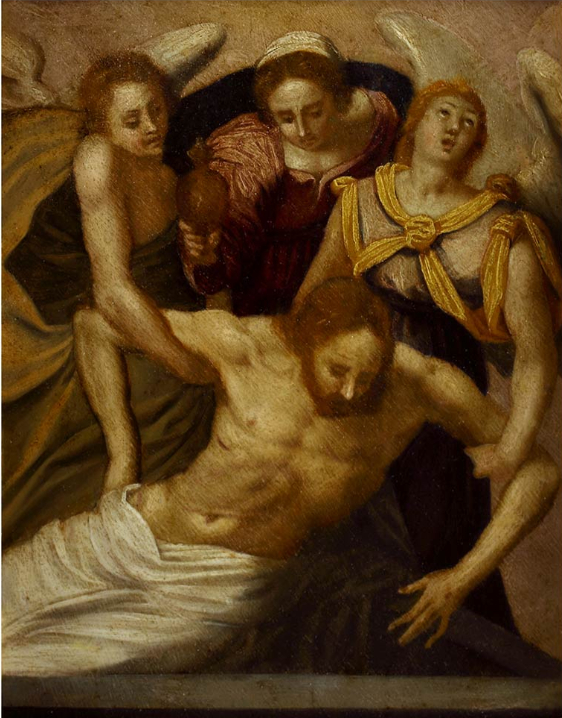
Christ lifted up by angels

It is not clear with whom or whether he studied art in Antwerp as he is not mentioned in the records of the Antwerp Guild of Saint Luke. He travelled in 1589 to Hamburg with his younger brother Cornelis. Here they soon met the prominent Dutch painter Jacob Isaacsz. van Swanenburg. He travelled to Naples around 1598. Jacob Isaacsz. van Swanenburg had already taken up residence in Naples around 1596. In Naples Abraham married Vittoria Obbekens Albartsdr (also referred to as Victoria Obbekens, Obekinck or Obis) on 29 January 1602. Although his wife was born in Maddaloni, Italy, her family name indicates that she was of Flemish descent. Her father was called Albert Obekinck. Witnesses at the wedding were Jacob Isaacsz. van Swanenburgh and Abraham's brother Cornelis. A daughter Margaritha (or Margriet) was born from this marriage in 1602 or 1603.

Archival records reveal that in Naples he received commissions from prominent patrons between 1600 and 1608. None of his works from his period of activity have been located. In a letter written to Antonio Ruffo dated 1673, the art dealer Giacomo de Castro mentions that Vinck was a famous portrait painter residing in Naples who was Flemish and a very close friend of Caravaggio ('amicissimo di Caravaggio'). Abraham Vinck was in Naples also a friend and business partner of Louis Finson, a Flemish painter and art dealer from Bruges. Together with Louis Finson he owned two works of Caravaggio: the Virgin of the Rosary (now in the Kunsthistorisches Museum, Vienna) and a painting of Judith beheading Holofernes which certain scholars believe to be the work that was discovered in the attic of a private home in Toulouse in 2014.

By 1609 Vinck had left Naples and was recorded in Amsterdam. His son Abraham was baptized on 30 May 1610 in the Oude Kerk in Amsterdam. This makes clear that despite his stay in Italy and marriage to an Italian bride, he was of the Calvinist faith. The witness at the baptism was Anna de Morimont, originally from Antwerp and wife of Charles Coorne, originally from Ghent.

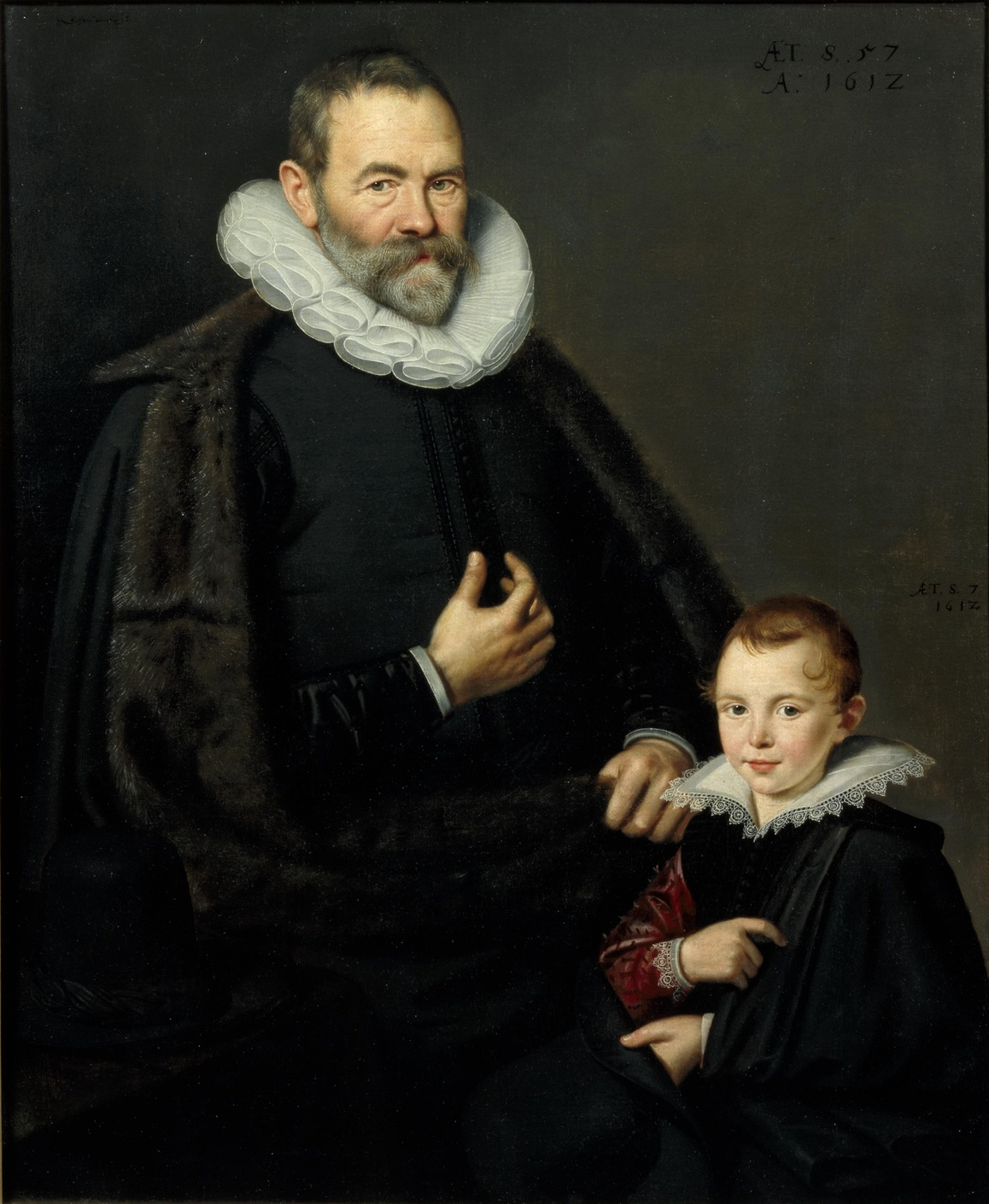
Portrait of Hans Martens and his son David

Art historian Marijke Osnabrugge believes that Abraham Vinck briefly returned to Naples in 1615 and again between 1617 and 1618. However, the Italian art historian Giuseppe Porzio has pointed out that another painter also named Abraham Vinck (or Vinx), who was somewhat younger, worked in Napels in the 1610s. This painter created an altarpiece for the Seminario Arcivescovile in Aversa which he signed.

On 4 September 1616, Vinck was a witness at the baptism of Thomas van Nieulandt, a son of the painter Adriaen van Nieulandt. He was the landlord of Louis Finson in 1616–1617 who rented from him a residence on the Oudezijds Voorburgwal in Amsterdam, which the artists may have shared. This shows that the artist had become wealthy. Another proof of his wealth is his later place of residence in Amsterdam. In 1619 he lived on the Fluweelenburgwal near the Varkenssluis, which was traditionally one of the elegant canals.

He died in Amsterdam where he was buried on 28 October 1619.

== Work ==
Vinck is mainly known as a portrait painter. From the description of his estate drawn up after his death it is clear that he practised in many other genres including history painting, mythological scenes, fruit and fish still lifes and market scenes. Only a few works are attributed to the artist. None of the works of his Naples period have been located. His known works are mainly portraits. A Christ lifted up by angels (At Bertolami Fine Arts Rome auction of 14 November 2018 lot 178) has been attributed to him. This small work is painted on copper.

He was also a copyist who created copies after the great masters. The Martyrdom of St. Andrew in the Musée des Beaux-Arts de Dijon, which is a copy after Caravaggio, is attributed by some art historians to Louis Finson and by others to Vinck, who is believed to have made the copy after Finson's copy after Caravaggio.

== The Caravaggios ==
Judith beheading Holofernes (Toulouse)

When Caravaggio left Naples on 14 June 1607, he left two paintings - the Madonna of the Rosary and Judith beheading Holofernes - in the studio in Naples that was shared by Louis Finson and his partner Abraham Vinck. Vinck likely took the two paintings with him when he left Naples for Amsterdam around 1609. Later Finson also moved to Amsterdam. The two paintings are mentioned again, this time in the will and testament dated 19 September 1617 prepared by Finson in Amsterdam. In his will Finson left Vinck his share in the two Caravaggio paintings that they had owned jointly since Naples. After Vinck died his heirs sold the Madonna of the Rosary after 1619 for 1800 florins to a committee of Flemish painters and "amateurs" led by Peter Paul Rubens for the Saint Paul's Church of the Dominican friars in Antwerp. In 1786, Emperor Joseph II of Austria first ordered the closure of all 'useless' monastic orders and then claimed the painting of Caravaggio for his art collection. It can now be admired in the Kunsthistorisches Museum in Vienna. Caravaggio's work, which was a gift of Antwerp's leading artists and an expression of their deep religious devotion had thus become the object of looting by the Austrian rulers of Flanders.

There was no trace of the second Caravaggio representing Judith beheading Holofernes co-owned by Vinck and Finson since the early 1600s. It was suggested that it should be identified with the painting in the collection of the Intesa Sanpaolo bank in Naples. A painting of Judith beheading Holofernes discovered in an attic in Toulouse in 2014 is believed by certain scholars to be the lost Caravaggio. Other scholars see in both the Toulouse Judith and the work in the collection of the Intesa Sanpaolo bank not only works painted by the hand of Finson but they have also contended that they are in fact original creations of Finson rather than copies after a lost Caravaggio. The Toulouse version has even been described as Finson's masterpiece. While the Toulouse Judith was slated to be auctioned in June 2019, it was snapped up by hedge fund manager J. Tomilson Hill through a private sale at an undisclosed amount shortly before the auction was planned to go ahead.
