= French Riviera =

Mediterranean coast in Southeastern France and Monaco

French Riviera Côte d'Azur (French) Còsta d'Azur (Occitan)
- Riviera
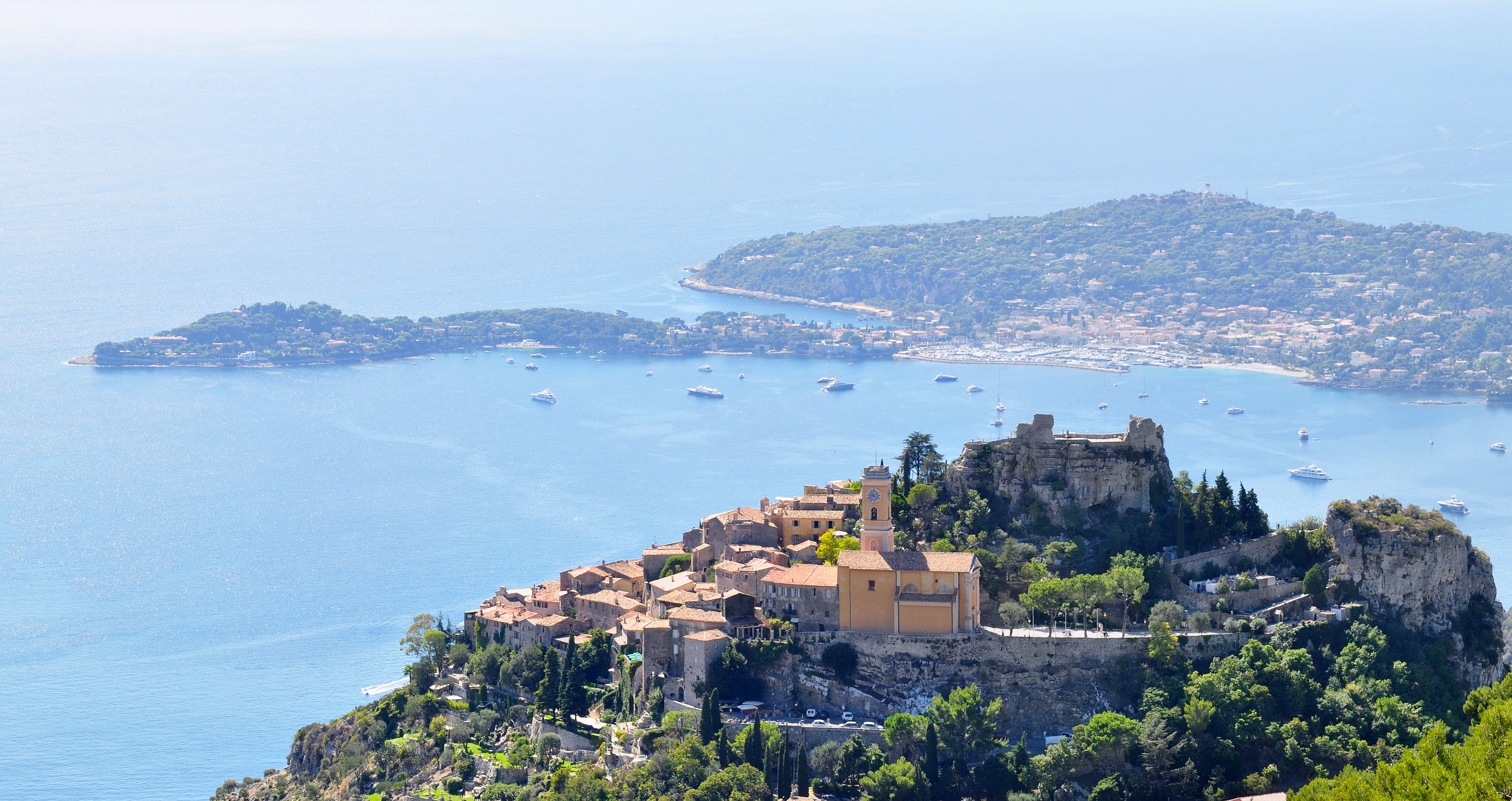
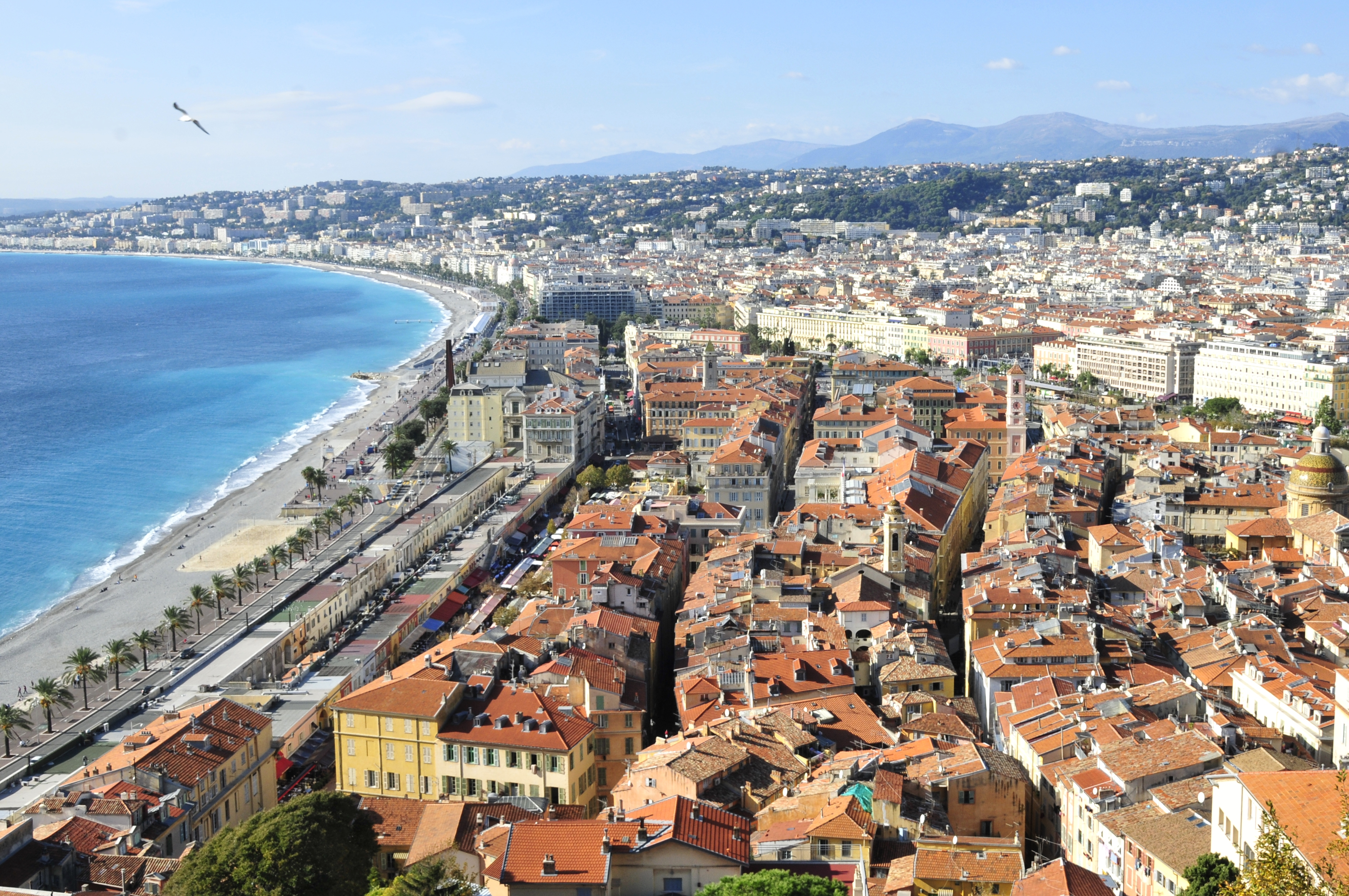
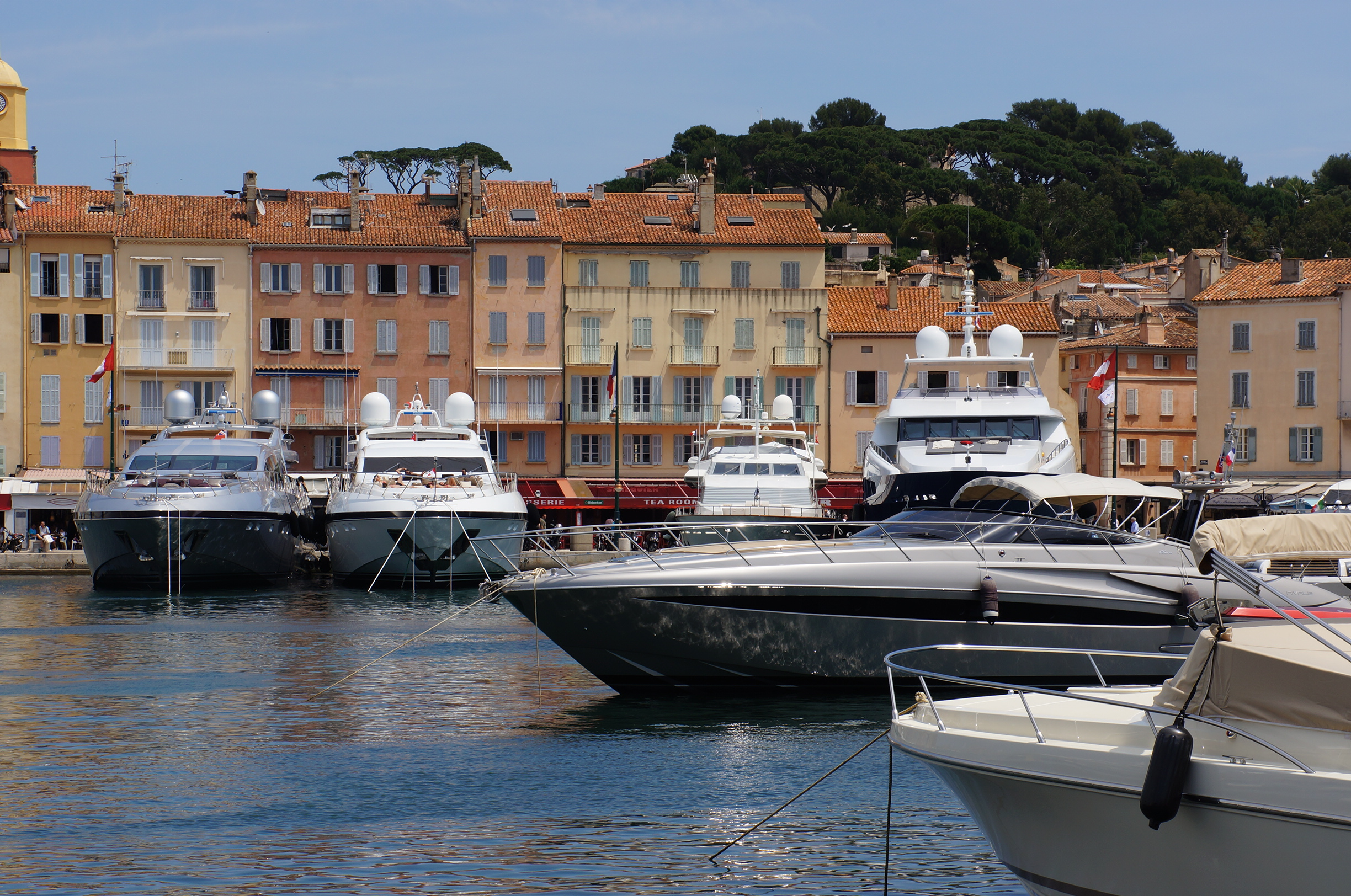
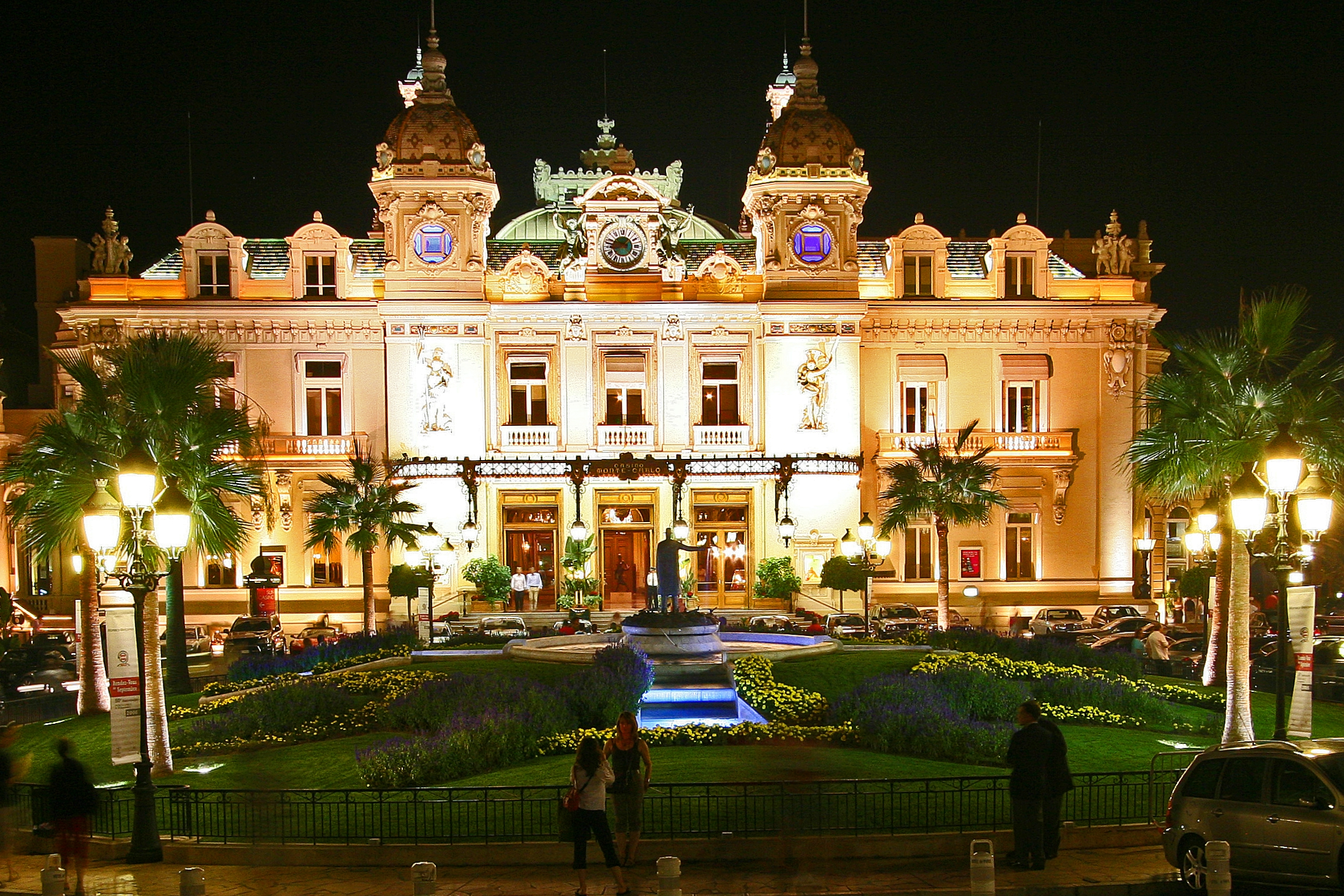
- Clockwise from top: a view of Èze with Saint-Jean-Cap-Ferrat; old town of Saint-Tropez; Monte Carlo Casino in the Principality of Monaco; and the city centre of Nice

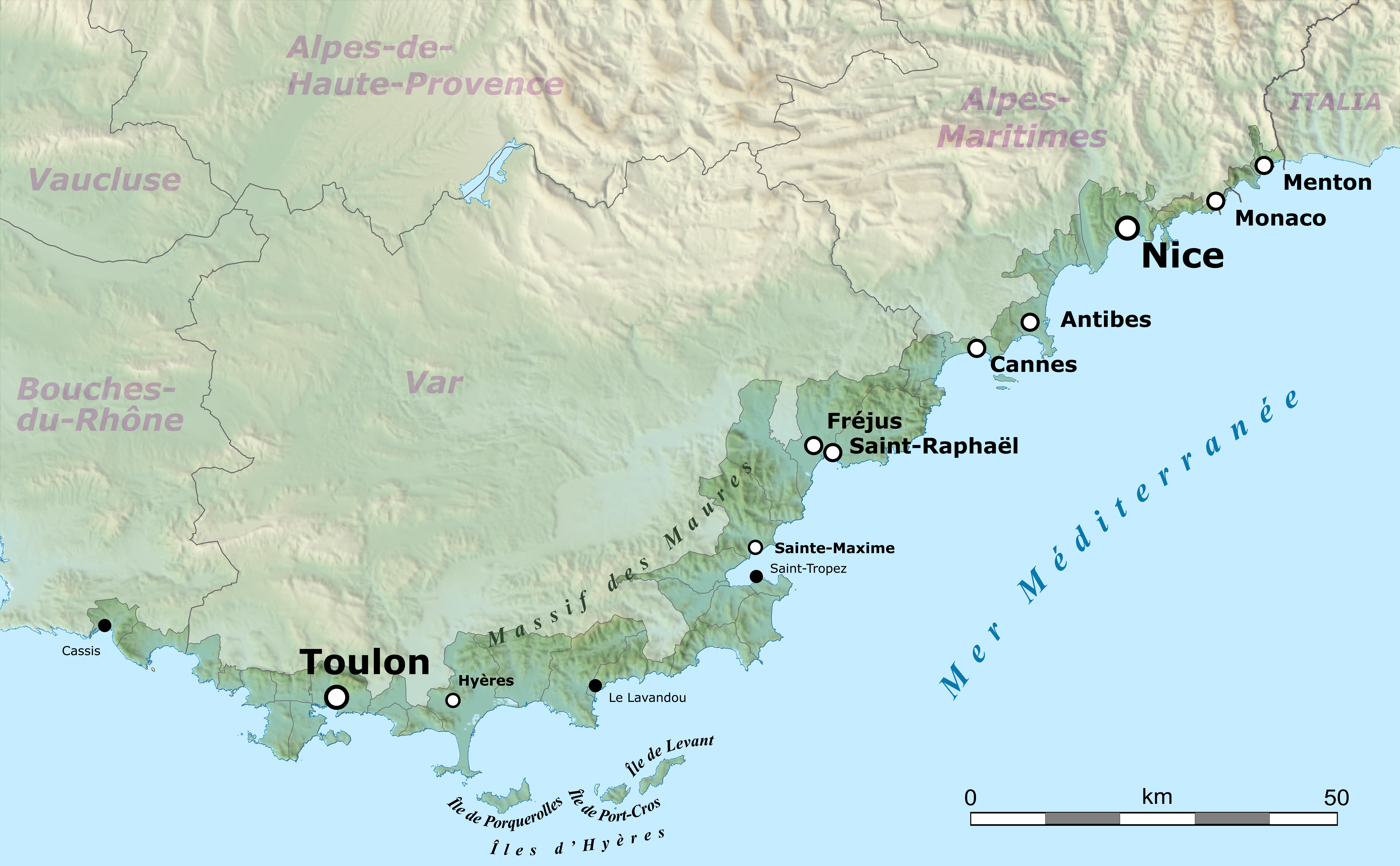
- Coordinates: 43°19′12″N 06°39′54″E
- Country: France; Monaco
- Website: cotedazurfrance.fr

Logo

The French Riviera or Côte d'Azur (French: [kot dazyʁ]; Provençal: Còsta d'Azur) is the Mediterranean coast at the southeast corner of France. The French Riviera extends from the coastal Alpes-Maritimes department, from the rock formation Massif de l'Esterel to Menton, at the Franco–Italian border. The coastline is in the Provence-Alpes-Côte d'Azur region of France. The Principality of Monaco is a semi-enclave within the region, circumscribed on three sides by France and the Mediterranean Sea. The French Riviera comprises the resorts of Cap-d'Ail, Beaulieu-sur-Mer, and Saint-Jean-Cap-Ferrat, Villefranche-sur-Mer and Antibes, Juan-les-Pins, Cannes, and Théoule-sur-Mer.

Riviera is an Italian word that originates from the ancient Ligurian territory of Italy, wedged between the Var and Magra rivers. Côte d'Azur is originally a nickname given by France to the County of Nice after its annexation in 1860, because the climate was similar to that of the north of Italy, even in winter, with "a sky as blue as its sea". When the Mistral (Northwest) and the Tramontane (North) winds are blowing in the Languedoc and Provence areas, the temperature of the Mediterranean can be very cool in summer. This phenomenon is observed very little or not at all on the coast between the French Riviera and the Italian Riviera.

This coastline was one of the first modern resort areas. It began as a winter health resort for the British upper class at the end of the 18th century. With the arrival of the railway in the mid-19th century, it became the playground and vacation spot of British, Russian, and other aristocrats, such as Queen Victoria, Tsar Alexander II and King Edward VII, when he was Prince of Wales. In the summer, it also played home to many members of the Rothschild family. In the first half of the 20th century, it was frequented by artists and writers, including Pablo Picasso, Henri Matisse, Francis Bacon, Edith Wharton, Somerset Maugham and Aldous Huxley, as well as wealthy Americans and Europeans. After World War II, it became a popular tourist destination and convention site. Many celebrities, such as Elton John and Brigitte Bardot, have homes in the region.

Officially, the French Riviera is home to 163 nationalities with 83,962 foreign residents, although estimates of the number of non-French nationals living in the area are often much higher. Its largest city is Nice, which has a population of 340,017 as of 2017. The city is the centre of a métropole—Nice-Côte d'Azur—bringing together 49 communes and more than 540,000 inhabitants and 943,000 in the urban area. Nice is home to Nice Côte d'Azur Airport, France's third-busiest airport (after Charles de Gaulle Airport and Orly Airport), which is on an area of partially reclaimed coastal land at the western end of the Promenade des Anglais. A second airport at Mandelieu was once the region's commercial airport, but is now mainly used by private and business aircraft.

The A8 autoroute runs through the region, as does the old main road generally known as the Route nationale 7 (officially now DN7 in Var and D6007 in Alpes-Maritimes). High-speed trains serve the coastal region and inland to Grasse, with the TGV Sud-Est service reaching Nice-Ville station in five and a half hours from Paris. The French Riviera has a total population of more than two million. It is home to a high tech and science park (French: technopole) at Sophia-Antipolis (north of Antibes) and a research and technology centre at the University of Nice Sophia Antipolis. The region has 35,000 students, of whom 25 percent are working toward a doctorate. The French Riviera is a major yachting and cruising area with several marinas along its coast. According to the Côte d'Azur Economic Development Agency, each year the Riviera hosts 50 percent of the world's superyacht fleet, with 90 percent of all superyachts visiting the region's coast at least once in their lifetime. As a tourist centre, the French Riviera benefits from 310 to 330 days of sunshine per year, 115 kilometres (71 miles) of coastline and beaches, 18 golf courses, 14 ski resorts and 3,000 restaurants.

== Etymology ==
=== Origin of term ===
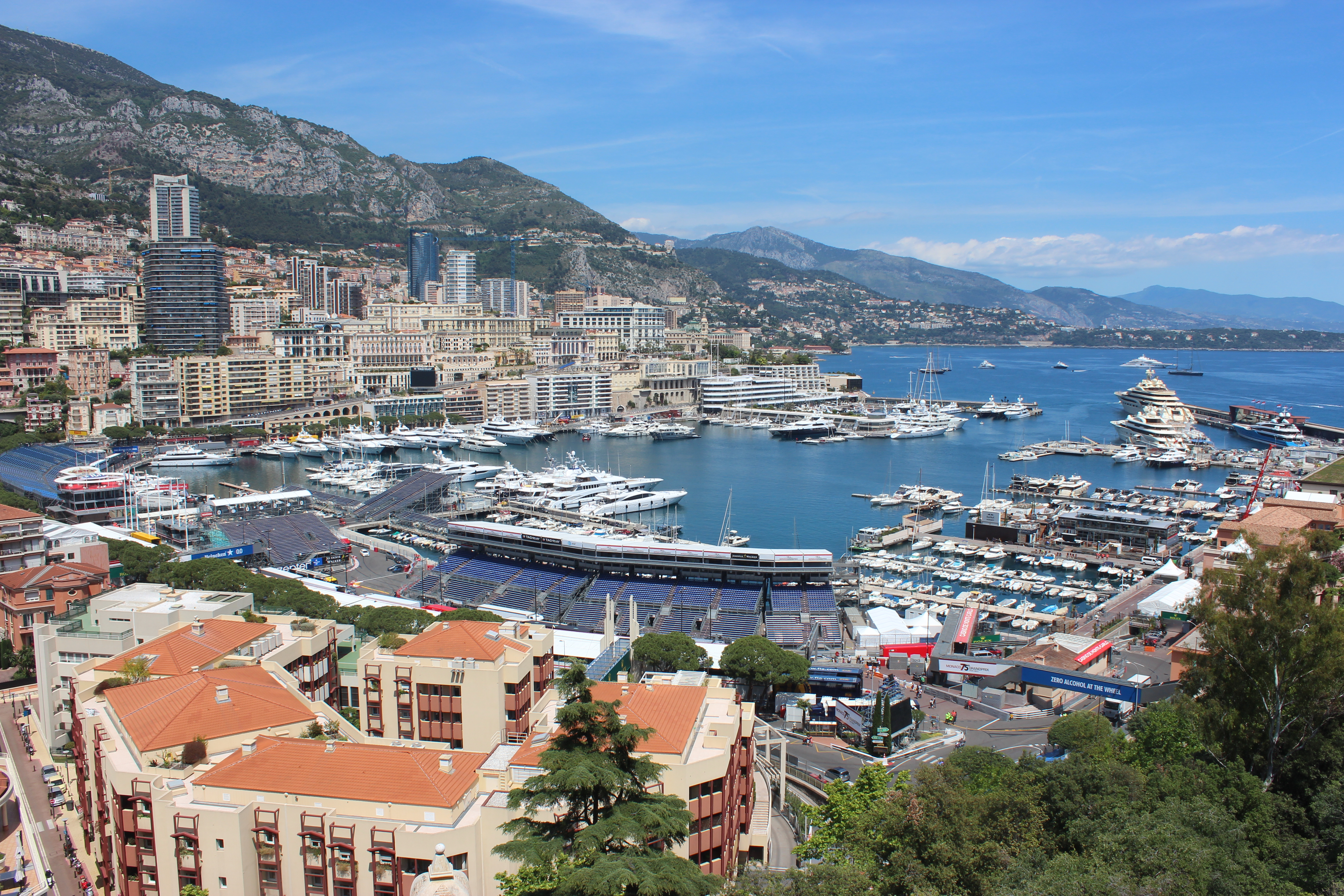
View of Port Hercules, Monaco

The term French Riviera comes by analogy with the term Italian Riviera, which extends east of the French Riviera (from Ventimiglia to La Spezia). As early as the 19th century, the British referred to the region as the Riviera or the French Riviera, usually referring to the eastern part of the coast, between Monaco and the Italian border. Riviera is an Italian noun which means "coastline".

The name Côte d'Azur was given to the coast by the writer Stéphen Liégeard in his book, La Côte d’azur, published in December 1887. Liégeard was born in Dijon, in the French department of Côte-d'Or, and adapted that name by substituting the azure colour of the Mediterranean for the gold of Côte-d'Or.

In Occitan (Niçard and Provençal) and French, the only usual names are Còsta d'Azur in Occitan and Côte d'Azur in French. A term like "French Riviera" (Ribiera Francesa in Occitan, Riviera Française in French) would only be used in literal translation, or adaptations of it. For instance, in French, "Riviera Française" is found in the online Larousse encyclopedia to refer to the holidays of a group of English workers (moreover, in Occitan, the word ribiera "coastline" mostly works as a common name, whereas in French, the old-fashioned term Rivière de Gênes was used to refer to the Italian Riviera whose center is Genoa).

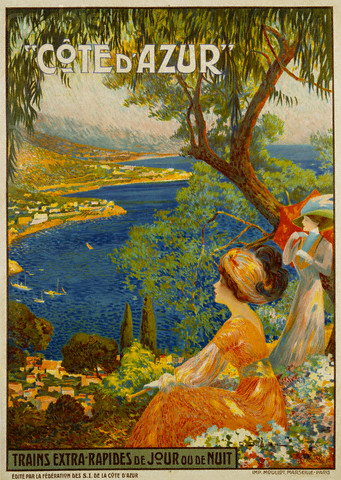
Poster by David Dellepiane (1866–1932)

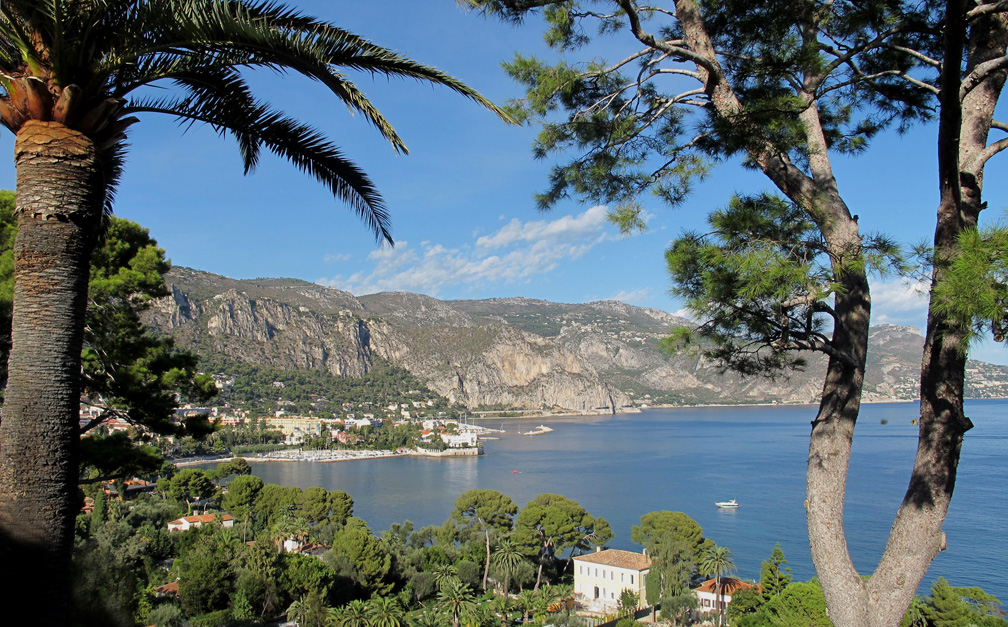
The French riviera between Beaulieu-sur-Mer and Cap-d'Ail, as seen from Saint-Jean-Cap-Ferrat

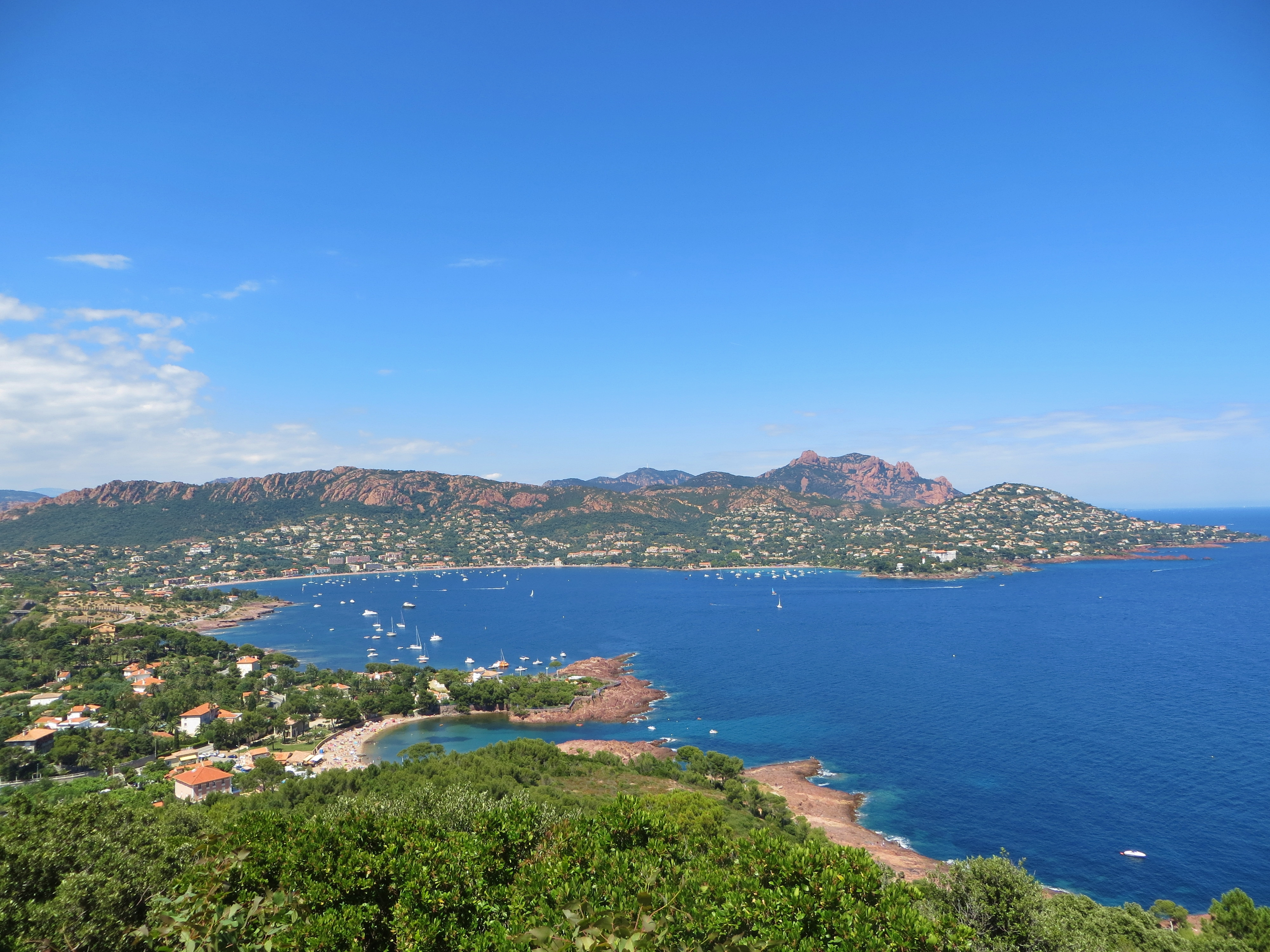
Agay, a seaside resort in Saint-Raphaël

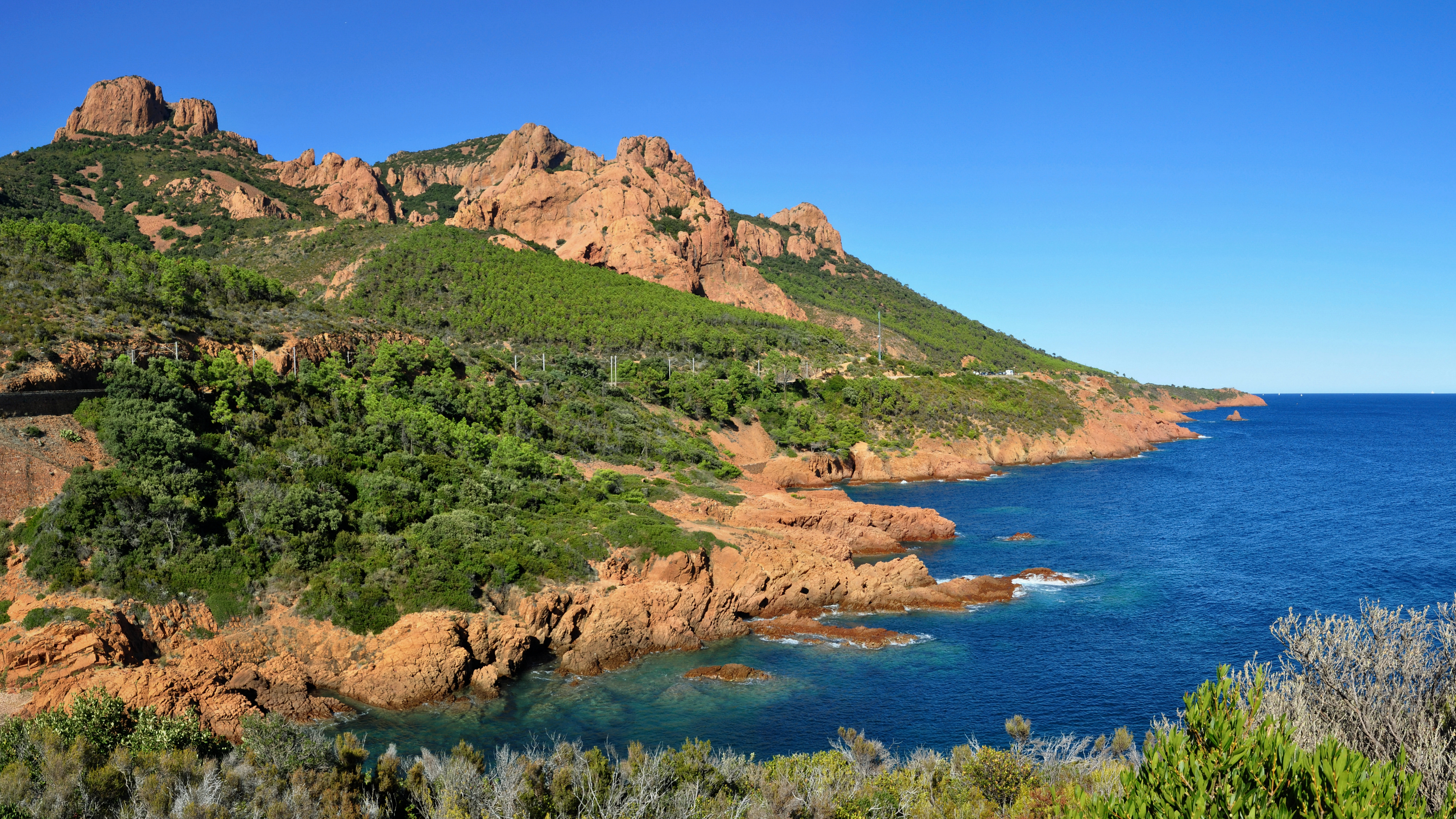
Cap-Roux and the Corniche d'Or in the calanque of Anthéor, Massif de l'Esterel

=== Disputes over the extent of the Riviera and the Côte d'Azur ===
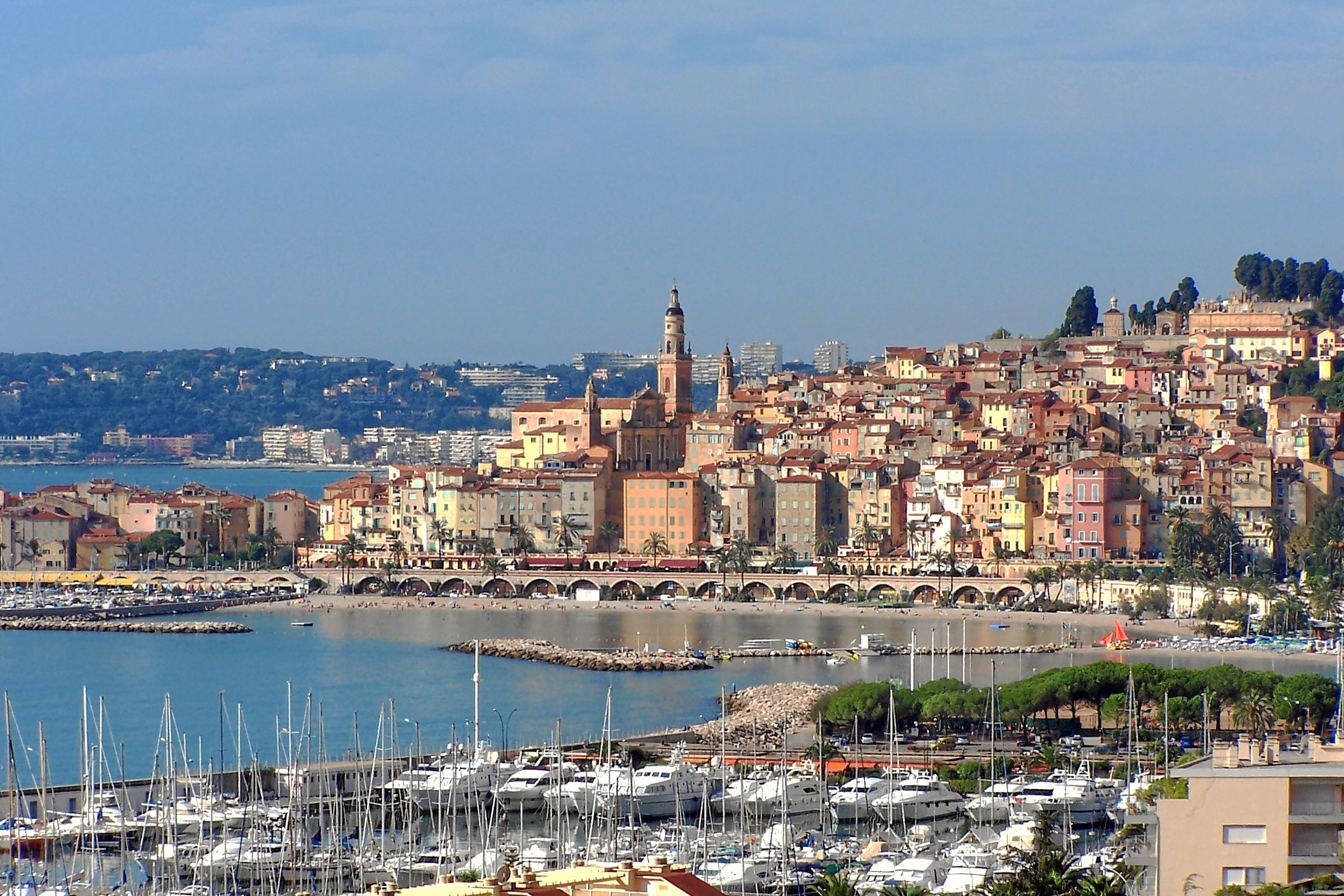
The Old Town district of Menton, which is the last town on the Côte d'Azur before the Italian border

Côte d'Azur and the French Riviera have no official boundaries. Some sources put the western boundary at Saint-Tropez. Others include Saint Tropez, Hyères or Toulon in the Var (departement), or as far as Cassis in the Bouches-du-Rhône departement. In her 1955 novel, The Talented Mr. Ripley, Patricia Highsmith describes the Riviera as including all of the coast between Toulon and the Italian border.

== History ==
=== From prehistory to the Bronze Age ===
The region of the French Riviera has been inhabited since prehistoric times. Primitive tools dating to between 1,000,000 and 1,050,000 years ago were discovered in the Grotte du Vallonnet, near Roquebrune-Cap-Martin, with stones and bones of animals, including bovines, rhinoceros, and bison. At Terra Amata (380,000 to 230,000 years ago), near the Nice Port, a fireplace was discovered that is one of the oldest found in Europe.

Stone dolmens, monuments from the Bronze Age, can be found near Draguignan, while the Valley of Marvels (Vallée des Merveilles) near Mount Bégo, at 2,000 m (6,600 ft) elevation, is presumed to have been an outdoor religious sanctuary, having over 40,000 drawings of people and animals, dated to about 2000 BC.

=== Greek influence ===
Beginning in the 7th century BC, Greek sailors from Phocaea in Asia Minor began to visit and then build emporia along the Côte d'Azur. Emporia were started at Olbia (Hyères); Antipolis (Antibes) and Nikaia (Nice). These settlements, which traded with the inhabitants of the interior, became rivals of the Etruscans and Phoenicians, who also visited the Côte d'Azur.

=== Roman colonization ===
In 8 BC, the Emperor Augustus built an imposing trophy monument at La Turbie (the Trophy of the Alps or Trophy of Augustus) to mark the pacification of the region.

Roman towns, monuments and amphitheatres were built along the Côte d'Azur and many still survive, such as the amphitheatre and baths at Cimiez, above Nice, and the amphitheatre, Roman walls and other remains at Fréjus.

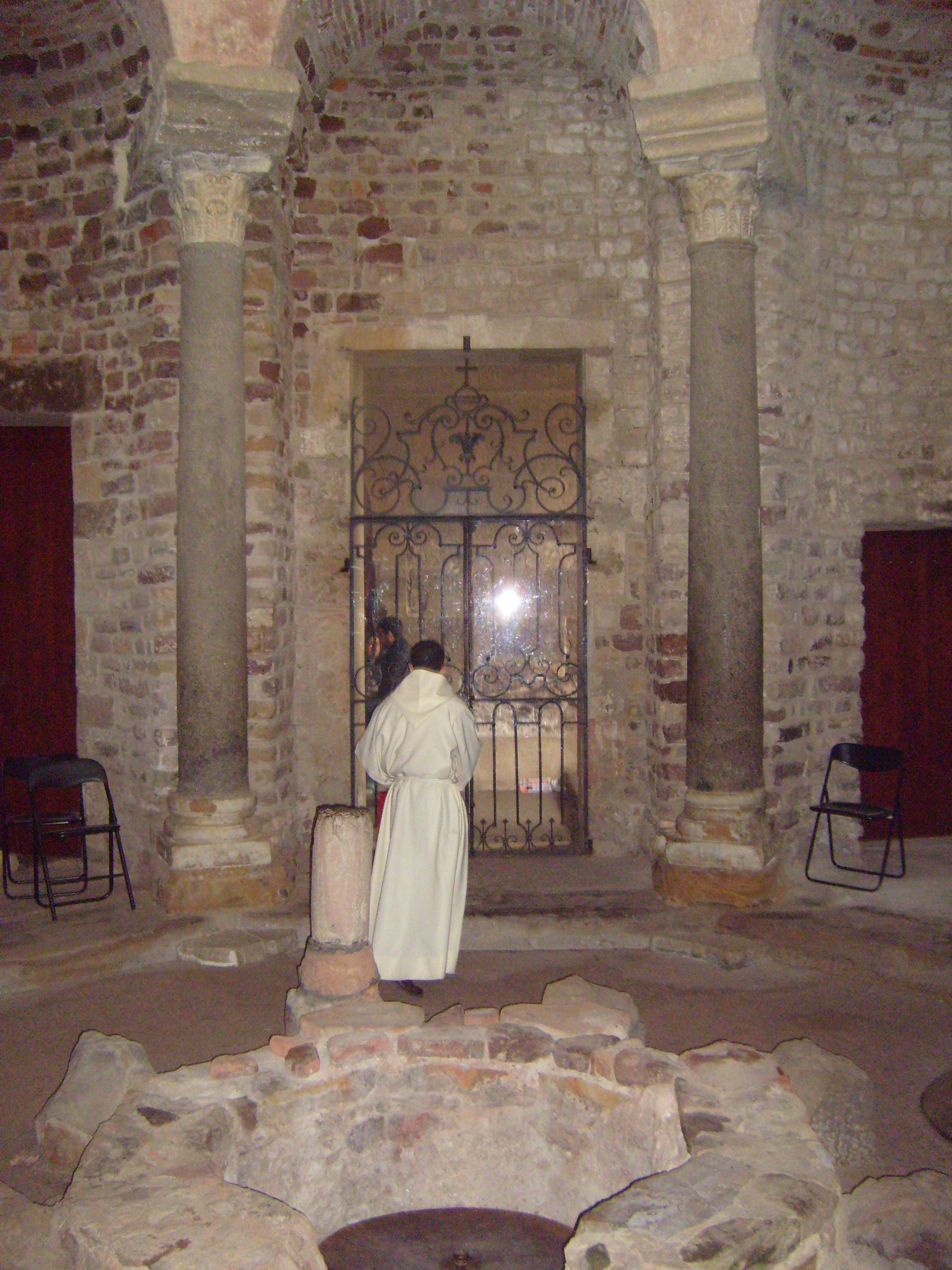
The 5th-century baptistery of Fréjus Cathedral, which is still in use

=== Barbarians and Christians ===
Roman Provence reached the height of its power and prosperity during the 2nd and 3rd centuries AD. In the mid-3rd century, Germanic peoples began to invade the region, and Roman power weakened.

In the same period, Christianity started to become a powerful force in the region. The first cathedrals were built in the 4th century, and bishoprics were established: in Fréjus at the end of the 4th century, Cimiez and Vence in 439, and Antibes in 442. The oldest Christian structure still in existence on the Côte d'Azur is the baptistery of Fréjus Cathedral, built at the end of the 5th century, which also saw the founding of the first monastery in the region, Lerins Monastery on an island off the coast at Cannes.

The fall of the Western Roman Empire in the first half of the 5th century was followed by invasions of Provence by the Visigoths, the Burgundians and the Ostrogoths. There was then a long period of wars and dynastic quarrels, which in turn led to further invasions by the Saracens and the Normans in the 9th century.

=== The Counts of Provence and the House of Grimaldi ===
Some peace was restored to the coast by the establishment in 879 of a new kingdom of Provence, ruled first by the Bosonids dynasty (879–1112), then by the Catalans (1112–1246), and finally by the Angevins (1246–1382, elder branch, 1382–1483 (younger branch).

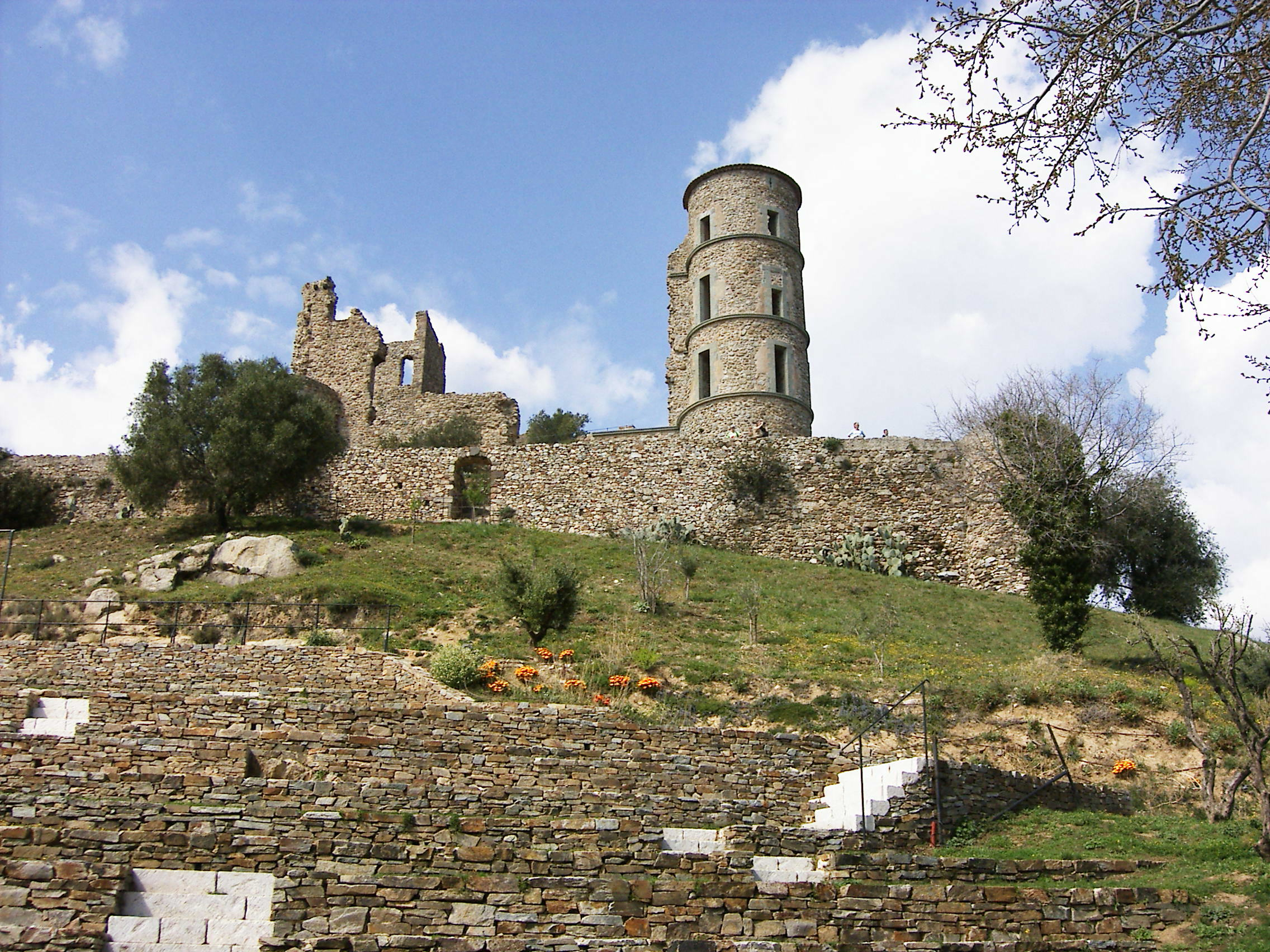
The ruins of the Grimaldi castle at Grimaud, near Saint-Tropez

In the 13th century, another powerful political force appeared, the House of Grimaldi. Descended from a Genoese nobleman expelled from Genoa by his rivals in 1271, members of the different branches of the Grimaldis took power in Monaco, Antibes and Nice, and built castles at Grimaud, Cagnes-sur-Mer and Antibes. Albert II, the current Prince of Monaco, is a descendant of the Grimaldis.

In 1388, the city of Nice and its surrounding territory, from the mouth of the Var to the Italian border, were separated from Provence and came under the protection of the House of Savoy. The territory was called the Comté de Nice after 1526, and thereafter its language, history and culture were separate from those of Provence until 1860, when it was re-attached to France under Napoleon III.

Provence retained its formal independence until 1480, when the last Comte de Provence, René I of Naples, died and left the Comté to his nephew, Charles du Maine, who in turn left it to Louis XI of France. In 1486, Provence formally became part of France.

=== Popularity with the British upper class in 18th and 19th centuries ===
Until the end of the 18th century, the area later known as the Côte d'Azur was a remote and impoverished region, known mostly for fishing, olive groves and the production of flowers for perfume (manufactured in Grasse).

A new phase began when the coast became a fashionable health resort for the British upper class in the late 18th century. The first British traveller to describe its benefits was the novelist Tobias Smollett, who visited Nice in 1763 when it was still an Italian city within the Kingdom of Sardinia. Smollett brought Nice and its warm winter climate to the attention of the British aristocracy with Travels through France and Italy, written in 1765. At about the same time, a Scottish doctor, John Brown, became famous for prescribing what he called climato-therapy, a change in climate, to cure a variety of diseases including tuberculosis, known then as consumption. The French historian Paul Gonnet wrote that, as a result, Nice was filled with "a colony of pale and listless English women and listless sons of nobility near death".

In 1834, a British nobleman and politician named Henry Peter Brougham, First Baron Brougham and Vaux, who had played an important part in the abolition of the slave trade, travelled with his unwell daughter to the south of France, intending to go to Italy. A cholera epidemic in Italy forced him to stop at Cannes, where he enjoyed the climate and scenery so much that he bought land and built a villa. He began to spend his winters there and, owing to his fame, others followed: Cannes soon had a small British enclave.

Robert Louis Stevenson was a later British visitor who came for his health. In 1882 he rented a villa called La Solitude at Hyères, where he wrote much of A Child's Garden of Verses.

=== Railway, gambling and royalty ===
In 1864, six years after Nice became part of France following the Second Italian War of Independence the first railway was completed, making Nice and the Riviera accessible to visitors from all over Europe. One hundred thousand visitors arrived in 1865. By 1874, residents of foreign enclaves in Nice, most of whom were British, numbered 25,000.

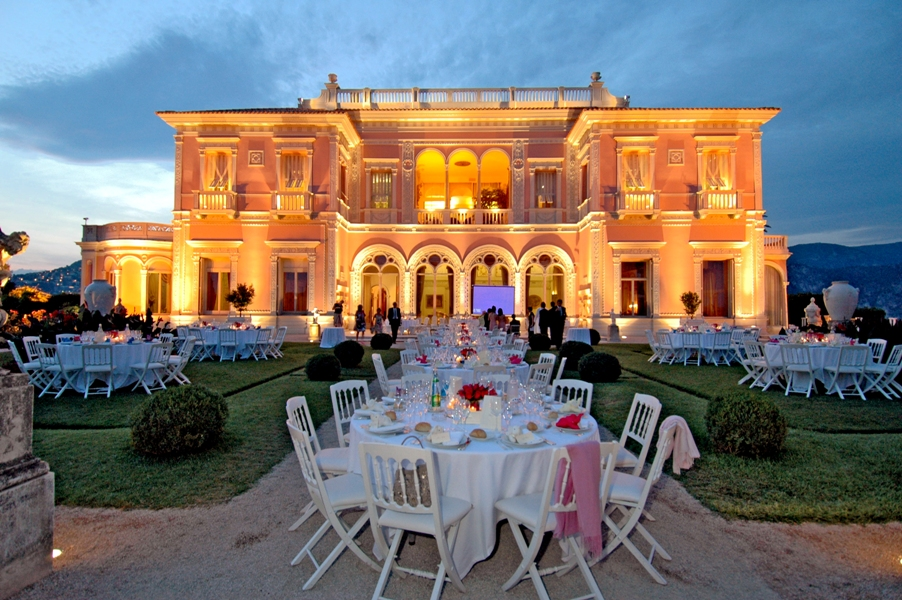
The Villa Ephrussi in Cap-Saint-Jean-Ferrat was built in 1905–1912 by Beatrice de Rothschild, of the Rothschild family.

In the mid-19th century, British and French entrepreneurs began to see the potential of promoting tourism along the Côte d'Azur. At the time, gambling was illegal in France and Italy. In 1856, the Prince of Monaco, Charles III, began constructing a casino in Monaco, which was called a health spa to avoid criticism by the church. The casino was a failure, but in 1863 the Prince signed an agreement with François Blanc, a French businessman already operating a successful casino at Baden-Baden (southwestern Germany), to build a resort and new casino. Blanc arranged for steamships and carriages to take visitors from Nice to Monaco, and built hotels, gardens and a casino in a place called Spélugues. At the suggestion of his mother, Princess Caroline, Charles III renamed the place Monte Carlo after himself. When the railway reached Monte Carlo in 1870, many thousands of visitors began to arrive and the population of the principality of Monaco doubled.

The French Riviera soon became a popular destination for European royalty. Just days after the railway reached Nice in 1864, Tsar Alexander II of Russia visited on a private train, followed soon afterwards by Napoleon III and then Leopold II, the King of the Belgians.

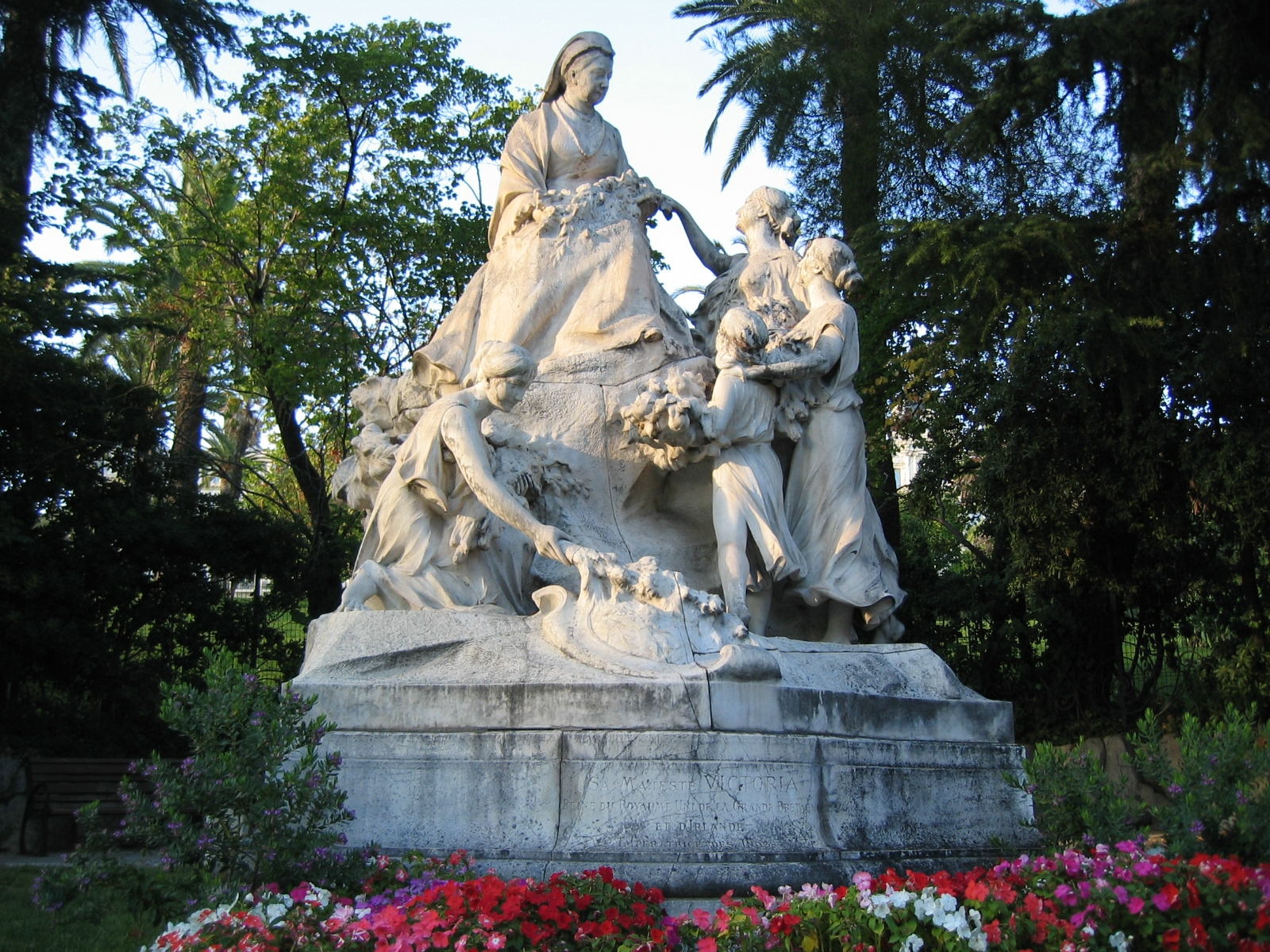
Monument to Queen Victoria in Cimiez, in the hills above Nice, where she was a regular winter visitor

Queen Victoria was a frequent visitor. In 1882 she stayed in Menton, and in 1891 spent several weeks at the Grand Hotel at Grasse. In 1892 she stayed at the Hotel Cost-belle in Hyères. In successive years from 1895 to 1899 she stayed in Cimiez in the hills above Nice. First, in 1895 and 1896, she patronised the Grand Hôtel, while in later years she and her staff took over the entire west wing of the Excelsior Hôtel Régina, which had been designed with her needs specifically in mind (part of which later became the home and studio of the renowned artist Henri Matisse). She travelled with an entourage of between sixty and a hundred, including chef, ladies in waiting, dentist, Indian servants, her own bed and her own food.

The Prince of Wales was a regular visitor to Cannes, starting in 1872. He frequented the Club Nautique, a private club on the Croisette, the fashionable seafront boulevard of Cannes. He visited there each spring for a two-month period, observing yacht races from shore while the royal yacht, Britannia, was sailed by professional crewmen. After he became King in 1901, he never again visited the French Riviera.

By the end of the 19th century the Côte d'Azur began to attract artistic painters, who appreciated the climate, the bright colors and clear light. Among them were Auguste Renoir, who settled in Cagnes-sur-Mer and in Mougins, Henri Matisse and Pablo Picasso.

=== Inter-war period, American visitors and decline of the aristocracy ===
The First World War brought down many of the royal houses of Europe and altered the nature and the calendar of the French Riviera. Following the war, greater numbers of Americans began arriving, with business moguls and celebrities eventually outnumbering aristocrats. The 'High Society' scene moved from a winter season to a summer season.

Americans began coming to the south of France in the 19th century. Henry James set part of his novel The Ambassadors on the Riviera. James Gordon Bennett Jr., the son and heir of the founder of the New York Herald, had a villa in Beaulieu. Industrialist John Pierpont Morgan gambled at Monte Carlo and bought 18th-century paintings by Fragonard in Grasse – shipping them to the Metropolitan Museum in New York.

A feature of the French Riviera in the inter-war years was the Train Bleu, an all first-class sleeper train which brought wealthy passengers down from Calais. It made its first trip in 1922, and carried Winston Churchill, Somerset Maugham, and the future King Edward VIII over the years.

While Europe was still recovering from the war and the American dollar was strong, American writers and artists started arriving on the Côte d'Azur. Edith Wharton wrote The Age of Innocence (1920) at a villa near Hyères, winning the Pulitzer Prize for the novel (the first woman to do so). Dancer Isadora Duncan frequented Cannes and Nice, but died in 1927 when her scarf caught in a wheel of the Amilcar motor car in which she was a passenger and strangled her. The writer F. Scott Fitzgerald first visited with his wife Zelda in 1924, stopping at Hyères, Cannes and Monte Carlo – eventually staying at Saint-Raphaël, where he wrote much of The Great Gatsby and began Tender Is the Night.

While Americans were largely responsible for making summer the high season, a French fashion designer, Coco Chanel, made sunbathing fashionable. She acquired a striking tan during the summer of 1923, and tans then became the fashion in Paris.

During the abdication crisis of the British Monarchy in 1936, Wallis Simpson, the intended bride of King Edward VIII, was staying at the Villa Lou Viei in Cannes, talking with the King by telephone each day. After his abdication, the Duke of Windsor (as he became) and his new wife stayed at the Villa La Croë on the Cap d'Antibes.

The English playwright and novelist Somerset Maugham also became a resident in 1926, buying the Villa La Mauresque toward the tip of Cap Ferrat, near Nice.

=== Second World War ===
When Germany invaded France in June 1940, the remaining British colony was evacuated to Gibraltar and eventually to Britain. American Jewish groups helped some of the Jewish artists living in the south of France, such as Marc Chagall, to escape to the United States. In August 1942, 600 Jews from Nice were rounded up by French police and sent to Drancy, and eventually to death camps. In all about 5,000 French Jews from Nice perished during the war.

Following D-Day in Normandy, Operation Dragoon (initially Operation Anvil), the code name for the Allied invasion of Southern France, commenced on 15 August 1944, when American parachute troops landed near Fréjus, and a fleet landed 60,000 troops of the American Seventh Army and French First Army between Cavalaire and Agay, east of Saint-Raphaël. German resistance was not as fanatical as Hitler and the High Command had ordered, and crumbled in days.

Saint-Tropez was badly damaged by German mines at the time of the liberation. The novelist Colette organized an effort to assure the town was rebuilt in its original style.

When the war ended, artists Marc Chagall and Pablo Picasso returned to live and work.

=== Post-war period and late 20th century ===
The Cannes Film Festival was launched in September 1946, marking the return of French cinema to world screens. The Festival Palace was built in 1949 on the site of the old Cercle Nautique, where the Prince of Wales had met his mistresses in the late 19th century. The release of the French film Et Dieu… créa la femme (And God Created Woman) in November 1956 was a major event for the Riviera, making an international star of Brigitte Bardot, and making an international tourist destination of Saint-Tropez, particularly for the new class of wealthy international travellers called the jet set.

The marriage of American film actress Grace Kelly to Prince Rainier of Monaco on 18 April 1956, attracted world attention once again. It was viewed on television by 30 million people.

During the 1960s, the Mayor of Nice, Jacques Médecin, decided to reduce the dependence of the Riviera on ordinary tourism, and to make it a destination for international congresses and conventions. He built the Palais des Congrès at the Acropolis in Nice, and founded a Chagall Museum and a Matisse Museum at Cimiez.

At the end of August 1997, Princess Diana and Dodi Fayed spent their last days together on his father's yacht off Pampelonne Beach near Saint-Tropez, shortly before they died in the Alma Tunnel in Paris.

== Geography ==
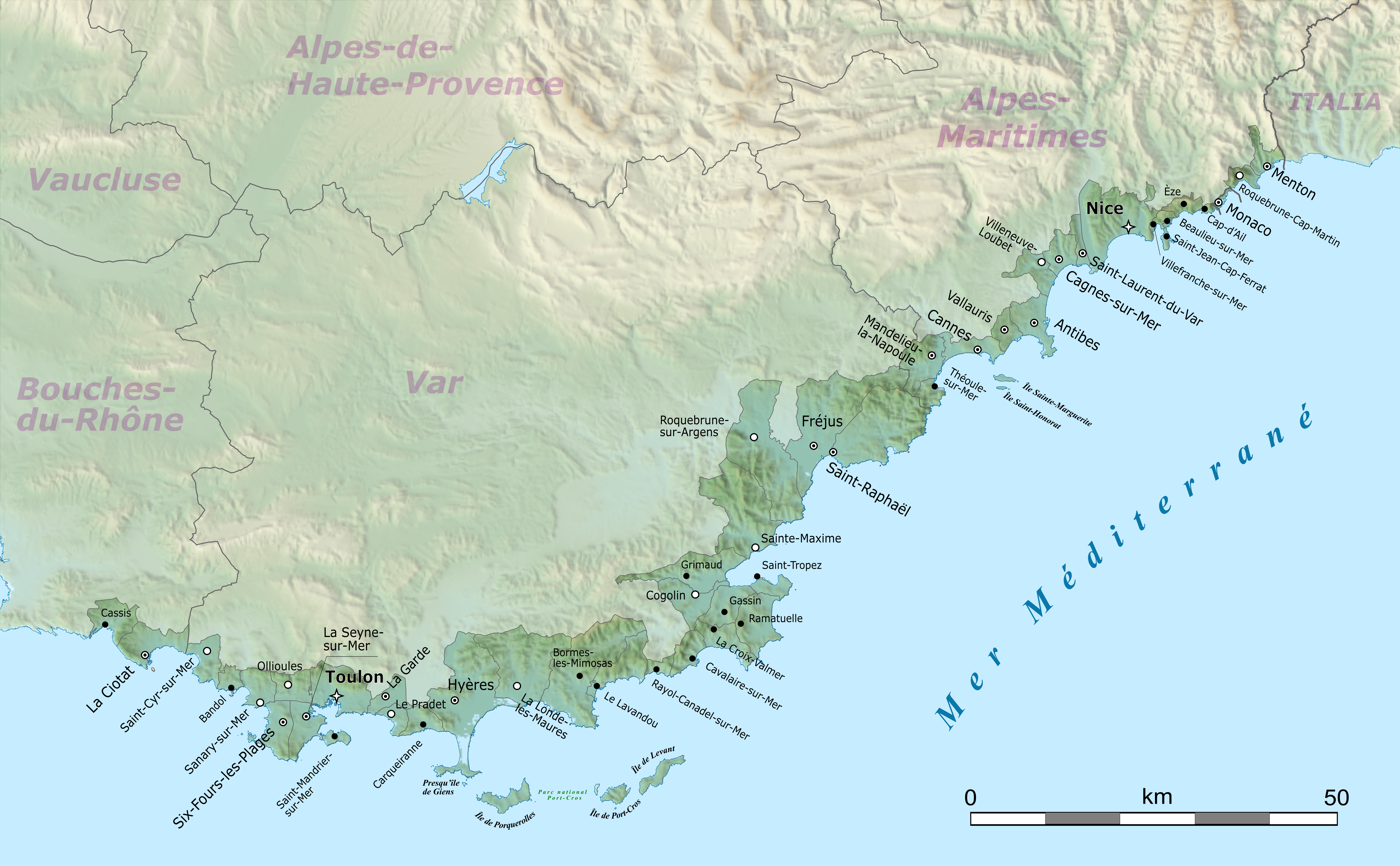
The 46 coastal municipalities

Cap Ferrat; Plage la Paloma, a beach on the Côte d'Azur

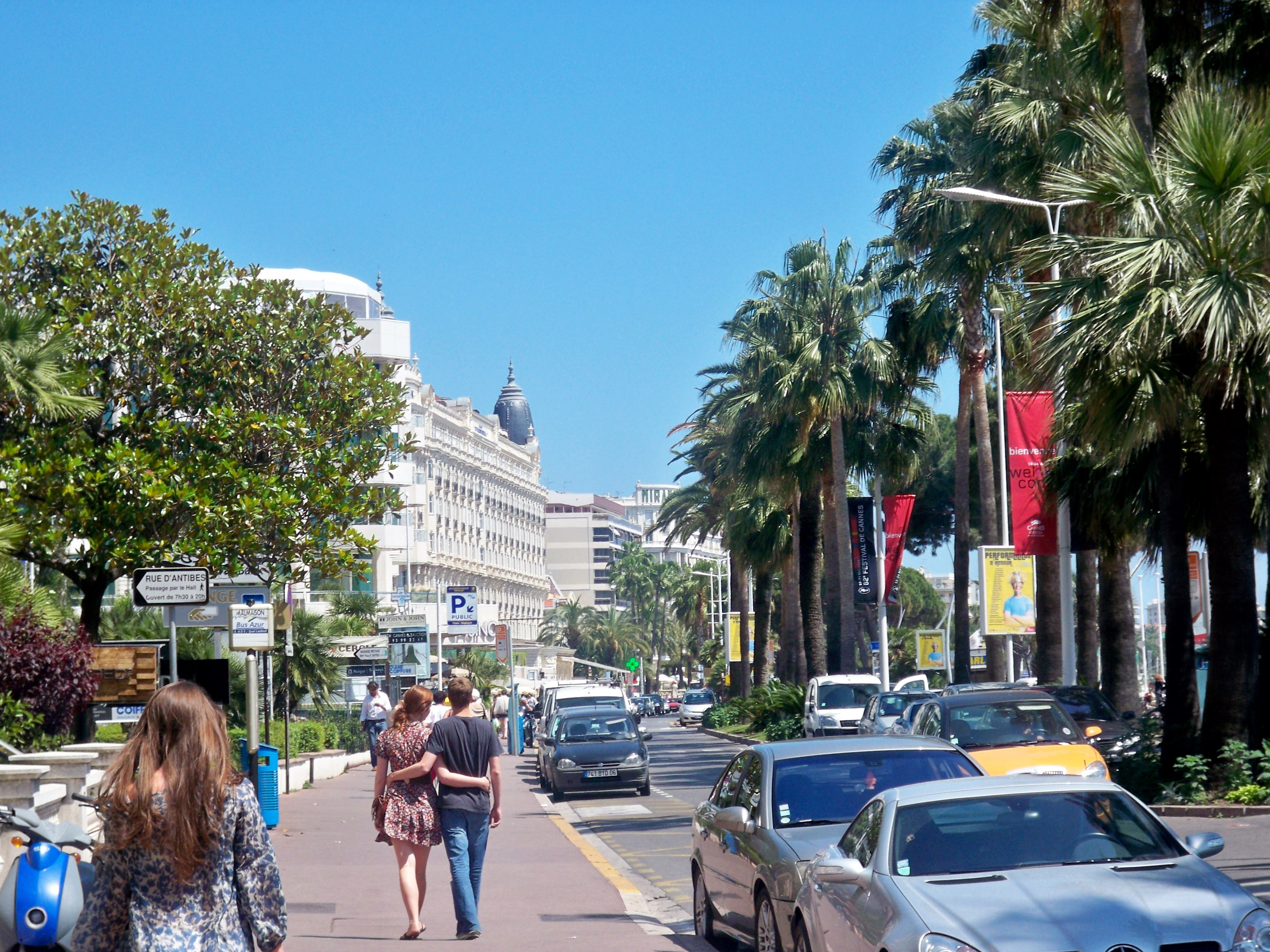
Boulevard de la Croisette along the waterfront in Cannes

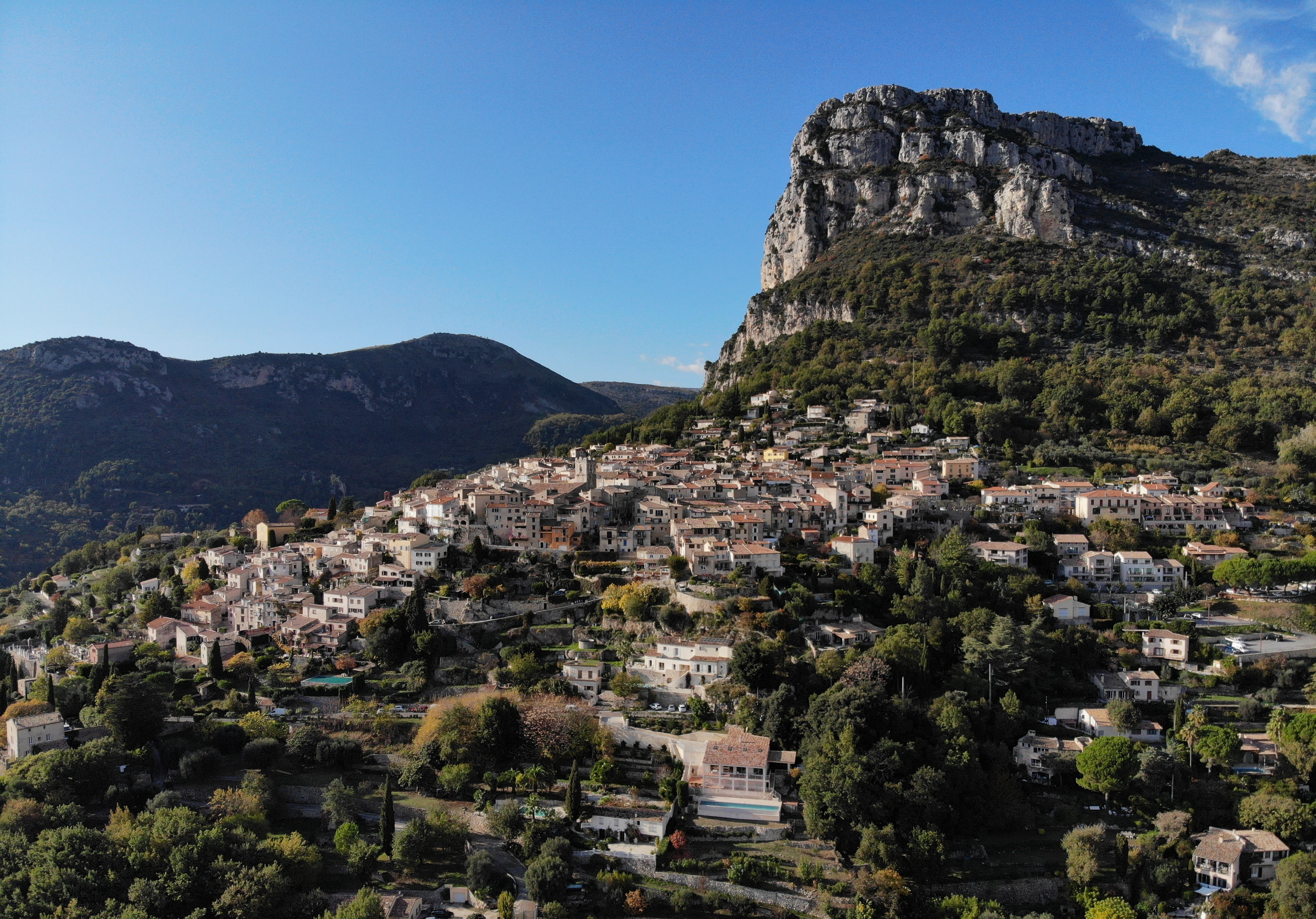
Saint-Jeannet, Alpes-Maritimes

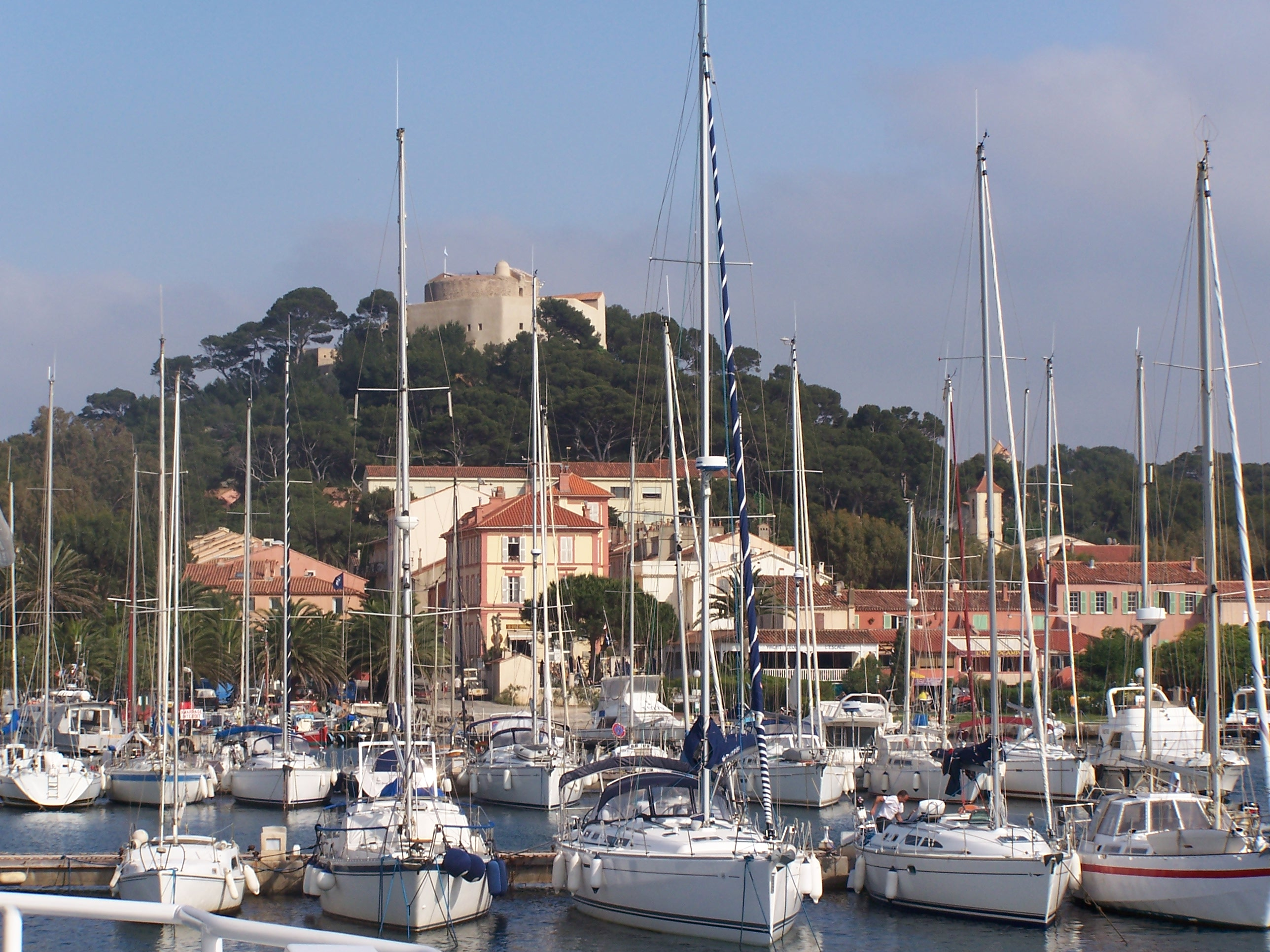
Port of Porquerolles, an island in Var

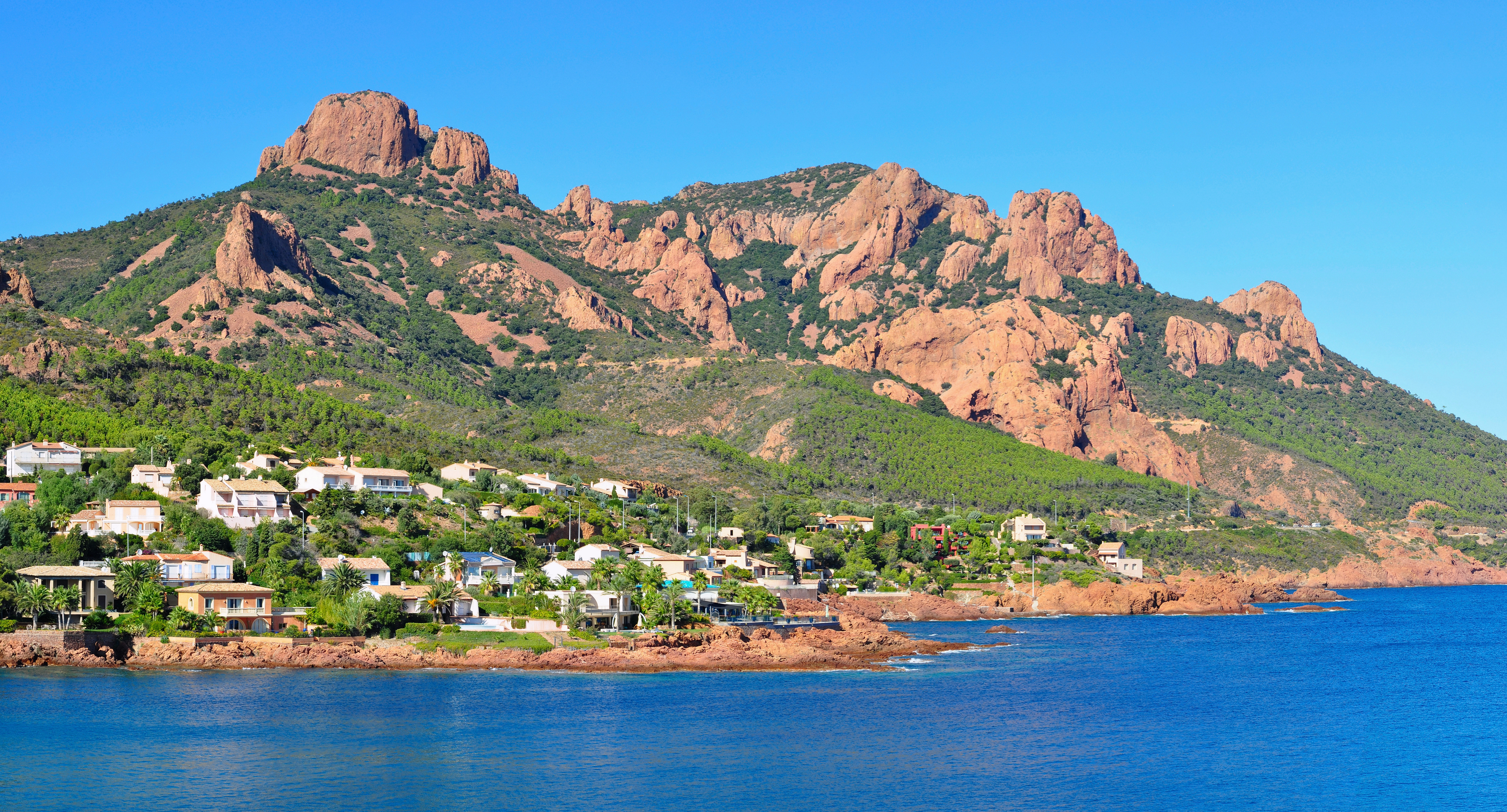
Saint-Raphaël

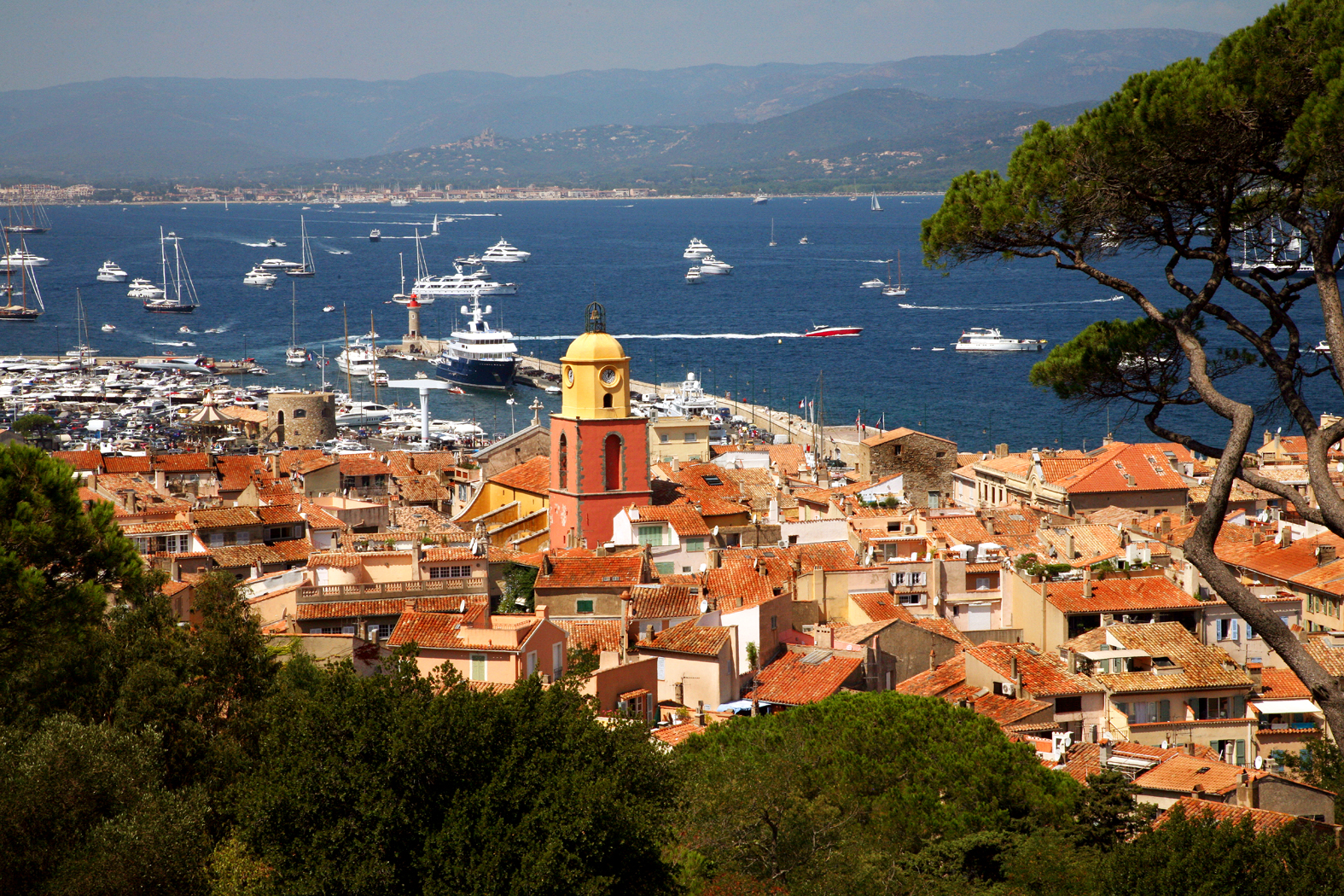
Saint-Tropez

=== Coastal municipalities ===
The 46 coastal municipalities from west to east
Municipality	Inhabitants (1 January 2018)	Département
Cassis	7,027	Bouches-du-Rhône
La Ciotat	35,281	Bouches-du-Rhône
Saint-Cyr-sur-Mer	11,580	Var
Bandol	8,404	Var
Sanary-sur-Mer	16,696	Var
Six-Fours-les-Plages	33,665	Var
Saint-Mandrier-sur-Mer	5,979	Var
La Seyne-sur-Mer	62,888	Var
Ollioules	13,771	Var
Toulon	176,198	Var
La Garde	25,380	Var
Le Pradet	10,265	Var
Carqueiranne	9,555	Var
Hyères	55,069	Var
La Londe-les-Maures	10,389	Var
Bormes-les-Mimosas	8,223	Var
Le Lavandou	5,981	Var
Rayol-Canadel-sur-Mer	689	Var
Cavalaire-sur-Mer	7,499	Var
La Croix-Valmer	3,778	Var
Ramatuelle	2,079	Var
Saint-Tropez	4,103	Var
Gassin	2,586	Var
Cogolin	11,556	Var
Grimaud	4,553	Var
Fréjus	53,786	Var
Sainte-Maxime	14,240	Var
Roquebrune-sur-Argens	14,626	Var
Saint-Raphaël	35,633	Var
Théoule-sur-Mer	1,350	Alpes-Maritimes
Mandelieu-la-Napoule	21,836	Alpes-Maritimes
Cannes	73,965	Alpes-Maritimes
Vallauris	27,072	Alpes-Maritimes
Antibes	72,915	Alpes-Maritimes
Villeneuve-Loubet	15,780	Alpes-Maritimes
Cagnes-sur-Mer	51,411	Alpes-Maritimes
Saint-Laurent-du-Var	28,511	Alpes-Maritimes
Nice	341,032	Alpes-Maritimes
Saint-Jean-Cap-Ferrat	1,533	Alpes-Maritimes
Beaulieu-sur-Mer	3,731	Alpes-Maritimes
Villefranche-sur-Mer	5,064	Alpes-Maritimes
Èze	2,225	Alpes-Maritimes
Cap-d’Ail	4,529	Alpes-Maritimes
Monaco	38,100	—
Roquebrune-Cap-Martin	12,824	Alpes-Maritimes
Menton	30,231	Alpes-Maritimes
Total (46)	1,383,588	—

=== Places ===
Places on the Côte d'Azur (following the broadest definition), following the coast from south-west to north-east, include:

- Cassis
- La Ciotat
- Bandol
- Sanary-sur-Mer
- Six-Fours-les-Plages
- La Seyne-sur-Mer
- Toulon
- Hyères and the Îles d'Hyères (Porquerolles, Port-Cros and Île du Levant)
- Le Lavandou
- Cavalaire-sur-Mer
- Saint-Tropez
- Inland – Draguignan
- Inland – Grimaud, with Port-Grimaud on the coast
- Sainte-Maxime
- Roquebrune-sur-Argens
- Fréjus and Saint-Raphaël
- Inland – Fayence
- Les Adrets-de-l'Estérel
- Tanneron
- Théoule-sur-Mer
- Mandelieu-la-Napoule
- Inland – Grasse
- Inland – Mougins
- the Îles de Lérins – Île Sainte-Marguerite and Île Saint-Honorat
- Cannes
- Inland – Vallauris
- Inland – Valbonne
- Inland – Sophia-Antipolis
- Golfe-Juan
- Juan-les-Pins
- Antibes
- Inland – Biot
- Villeneuve-Loubet
- Cagnes-sur-Mer
- Inland – Vence
- Inland – Saint-Paul-de-Vence
- Inland – Saint-Jeannet
- Saint-Laurent-du-Var
- Inland – Belvédère
- Nice
- Villefranche-sur-Mer
- Saint-Jean-Cap-Ferrat
- Beaulieu-sur-Mer
- Èze
- Cap d'Ail
- Monaco (including Monte-Carlo)
- Beausoleil
- Roquebrune-Cap-Martin
- Menton

=== Tourism ===
Some data related to tourism on the Riviera in 2006:

- More than 14 million tourists
- 52% of customers from abroad
- 65 million nights stayed
- Tourists spending €5 billion
- 75,000 jobs; tourism is 18% of total employment in the Alpes-Maritimes.
- 500,000 tourists in the High Country
- 500,000 delegates
- 3 million admissions to museums and monuments
- More than 45% of tourists come by air

=== Climate ===
The French Riviera is mostly subtropical, featuring a Mediterranean climate, with sunny, hot, dry summers and mild winters. Winter temperatures are moderated by the Mediterranean; days of frost are rare. The average daily low temperature in Nice in January is 5.4 °C (41.7 °F); the January average daily low temperature in Toulon is 6.2 °C (43.2 °F). The average high temperature in August in Nice is 28.6 °C (83.5 °F); in Toulon the average daily high temperature is 29.7 °C (85.5 °F)

The Côte d'Azur receives more rainfall annually than Paris (803.3 mm (31.63 in) annually in Nice and 684.8 mm (26.96 in) in Toulon compared with 649.8 mm (25.58 in) in Paris), but the rainy days are much less frequent and the Riviera is considerably sunnier; 111 rainy days a year in Paris compared with 61 days in Toulon and 63 in Nice. Rain is generally more common in the Autumn and Winter months while the summers are drier. Toulon has 2,793 hours of sunshine a year, Nice has 2,668 hours.

Micro-climates exist in these coastal regions, and there can be great differences in the weather between various locations. Strong winds such as the mistral, a cold dry wind from the northwest or from the east, are another characteristic, particularly in the winter. Nice, in particular is surrounded by mountains to the North, protecting it from the Mistral winds making it feel milder on sunny days.

The Sirocco is a southerly wind, coming from the African continent and often felt on the Mediterranean coast of Europe. It is a hot and humid wind, occasionally carrying sand from the Sahara which is then deposited in coastal areas across Southern Europe.

The French Riviera is one of the mildest locations in the world for its latitude, owing to the Gulf Stream which moderates the temperatures in Western Europe, particularly in winter and the warming effect of the Mediterranean Sea. Because of this, the region boasts a long growing season and supports the growth of exotic flora such as Citrus Fruits and Palm Trees. Snow is very uncommon in the winters and the long, hot and sunny summers have long been a draw for tourists since the days of British Aristocracy.

Climate data for Nice (1981–2010 averages)
Month	Jan	Feb	Mar	Apr	May	Jun	Jul	Aug	Sep	Oct	Nov	Dec	Year
Record high °C (°F)	22.5 (72.5)	25.8 (78.4)	26.1 (79.0)	26.0 (78.8)	30.3 (86.5)	36.8 (98.2)	36.3 (97.3)	37.7 (99.9)	33.9 (93.0)	29.9 (85.8)	25.4 (77.7)	22.0 (71.6)	37.7 (99.9)
Mean daily maximum °C (°F)	13.1 (55.6)	13.4 (56.1)	15.2 (59.4)	17 (63)	20.7 (69.3)	24.3 (75.7)	27.3 (81.1)	27.7 (81.9)	24.6 (76.3)	21.0 (69.8)	16.6 (61.9)	13.8 (56.8)	19.6 (67.2)
Mean daily minimum °C (°F)	5.3 (41.5)	5.9 (42.6)	7.9 (46.2)	10.2 (50.4)	14.1 (57.4)	17.5 (63.5)	20.3 (68.5)	20.5 (68.9)	17.3 (63.1)	13.7 (56.7)	9.2 (48.6)	6.3 (43.3)	12.4 (54.2)
Record low °C (°F)	−7.2 (19.0)	−5.8 (21.6)	−5.0 (23.0)	2.9 (37.2)	3.7 (38.7)	8.1 (46.6)	11.7 (53.1)	11.4 (52.5)	7.6 (45.7)	4.2 (39.6)	0.1 (32.2)	−2.7 (27.1)	−7.2 (19.0)
Average precipitation mm (inches)	69.0 (2.72)	44.7 (1.76)	38.7 (1.52)	69.3 (2.73)	44.6 (1.76)	34.3 (1.35)	12.1 (0.48)	17.8 (0.70)	73.1 (2.88)	132.8 (5.23)	103.9 (4.09)	92.7 (3.65)	733 (28.87)
Average precipitation days	6	5	5	7	5	4	2	2	5	7	7	6	61
Mean monthly sunshine hours	158	171	217	224	267	306	348	316	242	187	149	139	2,724
Percentage possible sunshine	54	58	59	56	58	66	74	73	65	55	51	50	60

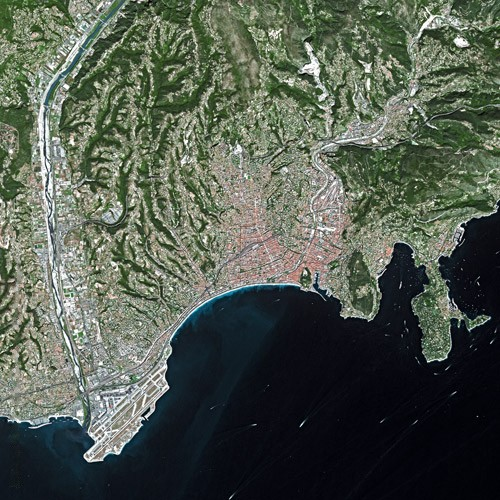
Nice seen from Spot Satellite

==== Nice and Alpes-Maritimes ====
Nice and the Alpes-Maritimes département are sheltered by the Alps. The winds are usually gentle, from the sea to the land, though sometimes the mistral blows strongly from the northwest, or, turned by the mountains, from the east. In 1956 a mistral from the northwest reached 180 kilometres per hour (110 mph) at Nice Airport. Sometimes, in summer, the sirocco brings high temperatures and reddish desert sand from the Sahara (see Winds of Provence).

Rain can be torrential, particularly in the autumn, when storms and rain are caused by the difference between the colder air inland and the warm Mediterranean water temperature (20–24 °C [68–75 °F]). The rainiest months are September (75.6 millimetres [2.98 in] average rainfall); October (143.9 millimetres [5.67 in]); November (94.3 millimetres [3.71 in]) and December (87.8 millimetres [3.46 in]).

Snow on the coast is rare, falling on average once every ten years. 1956 was exceptional, when 20 cm (7.9 in) blanketed the coast. In January 1985 the coast between Cannes and Menton received 30 to 40 cm (12 to 16 in). In the mountains, snow is present from November to May.

==== Var ====
The département of Var (which includes Saint-Tropez and Hyères) has a climate slightly warmer, drier and sunnier than Nice and Alpes-Maritimes, but is less sheltered from the wind.

The mistral, which brings cold and dry air down from the upper Alpine regions via the Rhône valley and extends with diminishing intensity along the Côte d'Azur, blows frequently during the winter. Strong winds blow for about 75 days a year in Fréjus.

== Events and festivals ==
Several major events take place:

- Monaco and southeast France: Rallye Automobile Monte-Carlo, January
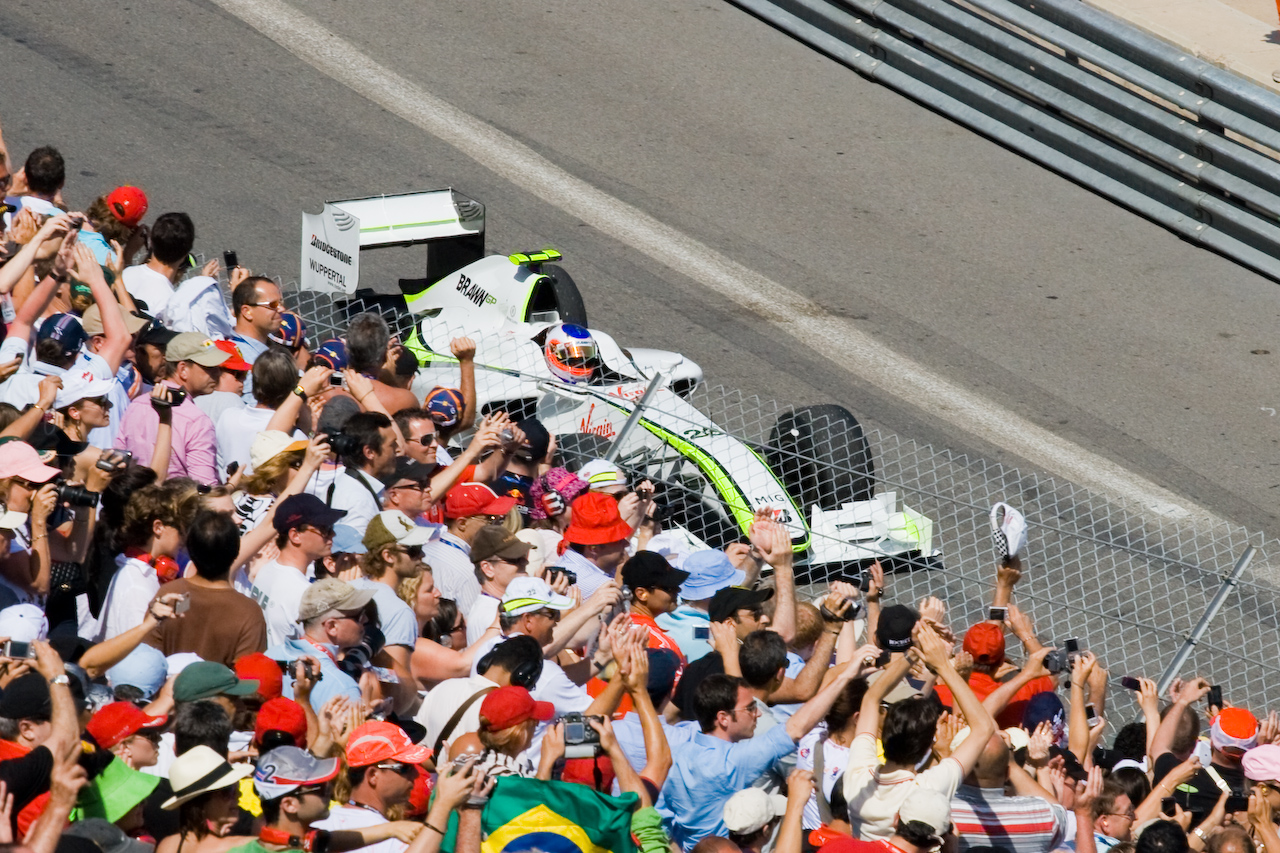
  Monaco Grand Prix race
- Monaco: International Circus Festival of Monte-Carlo, January / February
- Mandelieu-la-Napoule: La Fête du Mimosa, February
- Nice: Carnival, February
- Menton: Lemon Festival, February
- Tourrettes-sur-Loup: Violet Festival, March
- Monaco: Monte-Carlo Masters, April–May
- Monaco: Formula One Grand Prix race, May
- Grasse; Rose Festival, May
- Cannes: Cannes Film Festival and Cannes Film Market, May
- Nice: Jazz Festival, July
- Juan-les-Pins: Jazz à Juan, late July.
- Grasse: Jasmine Festival, August
- Toulon: Toulon Tournament, Tall Ships' Race
- IRONMAN 70.3 Races, May

== Painters ==
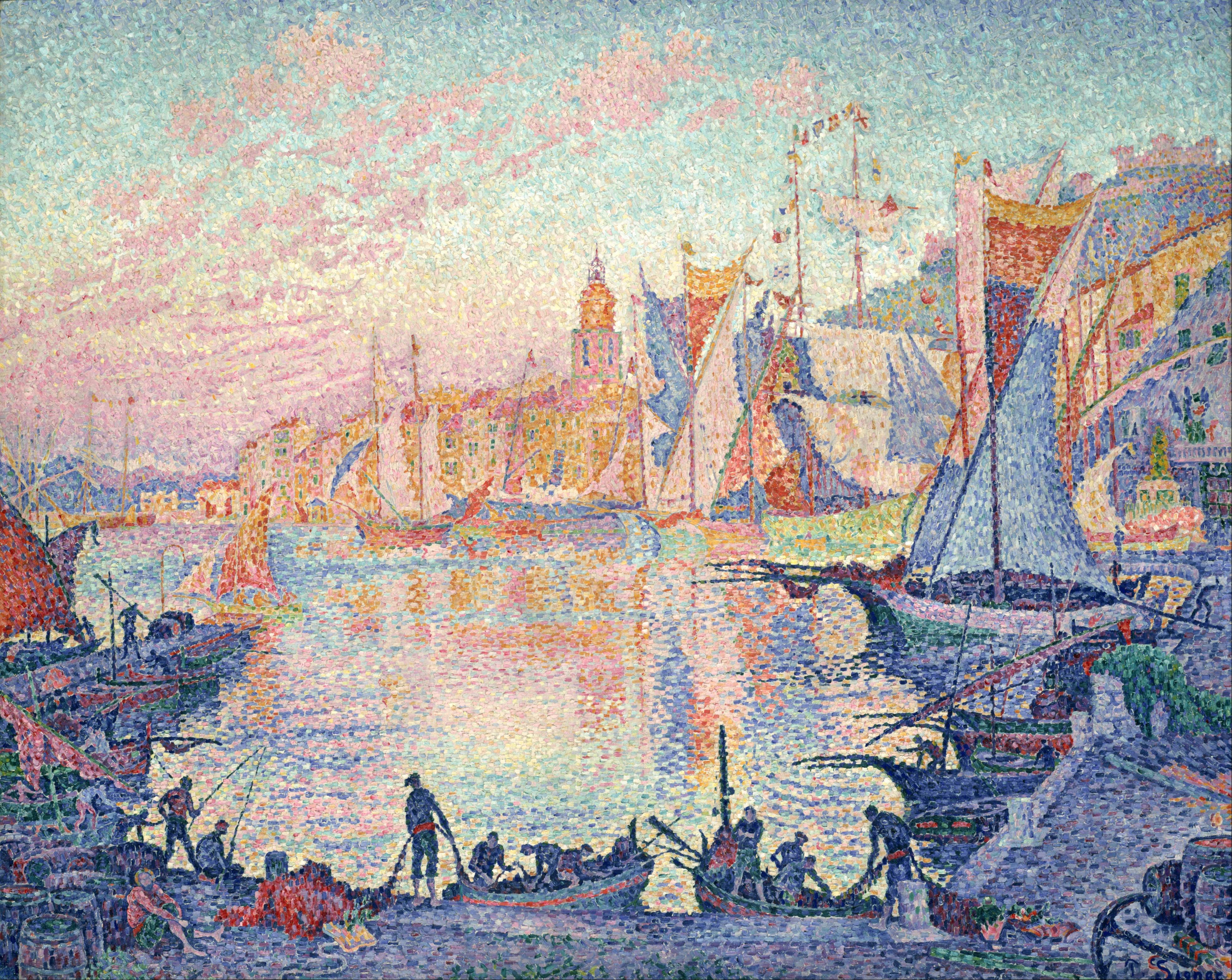
Paul Signac, The Port of Saint-Tropez, oil on canvas, 1901

The climate and vivid colors of the Mediterranean attracted many famous artists during the 19th and 20th centuries. They included:

- Pierre Bonnard (1867–1947); retired to and died at Le Cannet.
- Roger Broders (1883–1953); Parisian travel poster illustrator.
- Marc Chagall (1887–1985); lived in Saint-Paul-de-Vence between 1948 and 1985.
- Henri-Edmond Cross (1856–1910); discovered the Côte d'Azur in 1883, and painted at Monaco and Hyères.
- Maurice Denis (1870–1943); painted at St. Tropez and Bandol.
- Raoul Dufy (1877–1953); whose wife was from Nice, painted in the region, including in Nice.
- Albert Marquet (1873–1947); painted at St. Tropez.
- Henri Matisse (1869–1954); first visited St. Tropez in 1904. In 1917 he settled in Nice, first at the Hôtel Beau Rivage, then at the Hôtel de la Méditerranée, then at la Villa des Alliés in Cimiez. In 1921 he lived in an apartment in Nice, next to the flower market and overlooking the sea, where he lived until 1938. He then moved to the Hôtel Régina in the hills of Cimiez, above Nice. During World War II he lived in Vence, then returned to Cimiez, where he died and is buried.
- Claude Monet (1840–1927); visited Menton, Bordighera, Juan-les-Pins, Monte Carlo, Nice, Cannes, Beaulieu and Villefranche, and painted a number of seascapes of Cap Martin, near Menton, and at Cap d'Antibes.
- Edvard Munch (1863–1944); visited and painted in Nice and Monte Carlo (where he developed a passion for gambling), and rented a villa at Saint-Jean-Cap-Ferrat in 1891.
- Pablo Picasso (1881–1973); spent each summer from 1919 to 1939 on the Côte d'Azur, and moved there permanently in 1946, first at Vallauris, then at Mougins, where he spent his last years.
- Auguste Renoir (1841–1919); visited Beaulieu, Grasse, Saint-Raphaël and Cannes, before finally settling in Cagnes-sur-Mer in 1907, where he bought a farm in the hills and built a new house and workshop on the grounds. He continued to paint there until his death in 1919. His house is now a museum.
- Paul Signac (1863–1935); visited St. Tropez in 1892, and bought a villa, La Hune, at the foot of citadel in 1897. It was at his villa that his friend, Henri Matisse, painted his famous Luxe, Calme et Volupté in 1904. Signac made numerous paintings along the coast.
- Yves Klein (1928–1962); a native of Nice, considered an important figure in post-war European art.
- Sacha Sosno (1937–2013); French painter and sculptor who lived and worked in Nice.

== Writers ==
Many writers have also been inspired by the area, including Death on the Riviera by John Bude, The Garden of Eden by Ernest Hemingway, Imogen by Jilly Cooper, and Swimming Home by Deborah Levy.

== See also ==
- Gardens of Provence-Alpes-Côte d'Azur
- Southern France
- Portuguese Riviera
- Italian Riviera
- Turkish Riviera
- Riviera

== Bibliography ==
=== History ===
- Henry de Lumley, La Grand Histoire des premiers hommes européens, Odile Jacob, Paris, 2010 (ISBN 978 2 7381 2386 2).
- Aldo Bastié, Histoire de la Provence, Éditions Ouest-France, 2001.
- Mary Blume, Côte d'Azur: Inventing the French Riviera, Thames and Hudson, London, 1992.
- Patrick Howarth, When the Riviera was Ours, Routledge & Kegan Paul, London, 1977.
- Jim Ring, Riviera, the Rise and Fall of the Côte d'Azur, John Murray Publishers, London, 1988.
- Edouard Baratier (editor), Histoire de la Provence, Editions Privat, Toulouse, 1969 (ISBN 2 7089 1649 1).

=== Painters ===
- La Méditerranée de Courbet à Matisse, catalog of the exhibit at the Grand Palais, Paris from September 2000 to January 2001. Published by the Réunion des musées nationaux, 2000.
