= Tommy Recco =

French serial killer (1934–2025)

- Born: Joseph-Thomas Recco; 10 May 1934; Propriano, Corsica, France
- Died: 20 November 2025 (aged 91); Marseille, France
- Other name: Geronimo
- Status: Deceased
- Conviction: Murder (seven counts)
- Penalty: Life imprisonment

Details
- Victims: 7–10
- Span of crimes: 1959–1980
- Country: France
- States: Corse, Languedoc-Roussillon, Provence-Alpes-Côte d'Azur
- Date apprehended: 30 November 1960 (first time); 19 January 1980 (final time)

Joseph-Thomas Recco (10 May 1934 – 20 November 2025), nicknamed "Geronimo", was a French serial killer.

In 1959, Recco was suspected of involvement in the disappearance of three German tourists, but the case was dismissed. In 1960, Recco murdered his godfather and was sentenced in 1962 to life imprisonment. Released in 1977, he killed three cashiers in Béziers in December 1979 and three other people, including an 11-year-old, in Carqueiranne in January 1980. He was sentenced in 1983 to life imprisonment without parole for these two triple murders. An inmate since 1980, Recco was one of the oldest detainees in France.

== Biography ==
=== Early life ===
Joseph-Thomas Recco was born on 10 May 1934 into a family of fishermen who ran a fishmonger's shop in Propriano. He was one of eleven children, "seven of whom met tragic fates: one died in infancy, two in accidents, two were shot dead, and two others were sentenced to long prison terms for murder."

In 1947, at the age of 13, Tommy "set nets with his father to supply the family fish shop". In the mid-1950s, Tommy Recco did his military service in the French Navy before returning to Corsica where he resumed his career as a fisherman. He married and had a son in 1956, whom he barely knew.

Joseph-Thomas preferred to be called Tomi or Tommy, an Anglicised name to better appeal to foreign tourists who agreed to go lobster fishing with him.

== Crimes ==
=== Disappearance of three German tourists ===
In 1959, three young German tourists disappeared near the coast of Propriano. After launching an investigation, the police learned that the three girls had been guided by one of the Recco children before disappearing. Suspicion fell on Tommy, aged 25, who was the last person to see them alive. Taken into custody, Tommy Recco admitted to having shown the young tourists around, but denied being responsible for their disappearance. He was released because there was no evidence to prove that he was responsible for the triple disappearance, nor to confirm that the three missing women were dead. It is also unknown whether Antoine Recco, aged 30, may have helped his brother commit the crimes: he came under suspicion in 1982 after committing a similar double murder the previous year. The disappearance of the three German tourists was ultimately dismissed.

=== First confirmed murder ===
In 1960 in Propriano, Corsica, Tommy Recco and his younger brother Pierre were fishing with dynamite. Suddenly, they were spotted by a marine guard, Casabianca, who happened to be Recco's godfather. For fear of being caught poaching and fired, Tommy Recco panicked, rushed to the beach and shot his rifle at his godfather; and to make sure he was dead, he beat him several times with the butt of his rifle, taking a big stone and violently hit his head with the latter. Once back at the boat, Recco refused to explain himself to his younger brother who saw blood on his hands and on the rifle. Propriano police went to the beach after discovering the body. They found green debris near the corpse, suggesting it came from the butt of a rifle. This green debris could come from a rifle belonging to fishermen or poachers, according to the police. Then a rumour spread that Recco had something to do with the murder. The police decided to interrogate him and realized he was the godson of the victim. Recco denied any involvement in the murder. Recco's family, led by his mother (already bereaved by the death of one of his brothers in a car accident and an infant's death), believed strongly in his innocence.

But on 30 November, Pierre, Recco's brother, denounced the latter to the police by stating he heard the cries of the godfather on the day of the murder. Recco was questioned again and denied involvement, but after several hours confessed to being the perpetrator of the murder. He said he did not want to pay a fine because of the dynamite fishing practice and he totally snapped. He rushed to the beach to kill the sea guard.

Following his confession, Recco retracted it. His trial took place on 8 December 1962. Sentenced to death but pardoned by Charles de Gaulle, his sentence was commuted to life imprisonment.

During his incarceration, Recco learned that many dramas had affected his family: one of his brothers, Toussaint, was killed in 1973 by his brother-in-law who had a dispute with him. Pierre, his younger brother, was killed in 1976 by two hooded men while anchoring his boat. One of his sisters, Francine, the wife of Toussaint's murderer, fell down the stairs and died a few months later.

Released on parole in November 1977, Recco moved to Marseille to start a new life and began working in a shop that sold diving suits.

=== Triple murder of Mammouth cashiers and triple murder in Carqueiranne ===
On 22 December 1979, a massacre occurred at the Mammouth shop in Béziers, where three cashiers under the age of 30 were executed in the counting room of the store: Renée Chamayou, 28, Josette Alcaraz, 27, and Sylvette Maurel, 27. In addition, 700,000 francs were stolen. The investigation proved difficult for police, as nobody had seen or heard anything. The police found that the victims had all been shot in the back of the neck and assumed that the killer(s) responsible were not afraid to act. The Béziers police brigade was unable to identify the perpetrator, and the investigation was halted.

On 18 January 1980 in Carqueiranne in the Var department, Sandrine Le Goff, an 11-year-old girl, heard her father, Gilles, arguing with another man. She decided to call her mother at work (a children's home) but the mother had already left. The little girl then spoke to the director of the home, who immediately warned the girl's closest neighbours. Jacques Coutrix, 52, a neighbour of the girl, went to see what was going on. Worried about her husband not returning, Mme Coutrix went to the girl's house where she discovered the body of her husband and the girl on the floor. She warned the gendarmes and once there they discovered, in the basement of the house, the father's corpse. The gendarmes gathered a preponderant clue: the girl reported to her mother's director that her father was arguing with "René's cousin".

The gendarmes conducted research to determine who was "René's cousin", discovering that a certain Tommy Recco had a cousin called René and that he knew the girl's father.

== Investigation ==
Immediately arrested, Recco denied every accusation and the gendarmes who questioned him were obliged to let him leave. Another gendarme took over and Recco saw his cousin from the gendarmerie brigade. Surprised, he asked the gendarme why his cousin was there and he replied that he was here because of "what you did". Then Recco wanted to tell why he had killed the three people at the villa. He said he wanted to buy a gun from the girl's father, whom he knew well. The latter refused, and an argument broke out. Recco saw red and decided to kill the man. Then he came out of the basement, crossed the garden, met M. Coutrix who came to see what was happening, followed him into the house and killed him by shooting him in the neck. He found himself alone in front of the girl and said that he panicked, killing her so as not to leave any witnesses.

However, following his statements, Recco retracted them.

The public prosecutor in charge of the Béziers massacre case had knowledge of the triple murder in Carqueiranne and noted that the three victims were killed by gunfire, like the three cashiers in Mammouth. He teamed up with the prosecutor in charge of the triple murder in the villa, and as a result of expert reports, discovered that the same weapon or the same type of weapon was used in both cases. Recco was therefore questioned about his possible involvement in the triple murder in Béziers but the latter refused. Nevertheless, in May 1980, a pensioner arrived at the police station in Toulon and declared that the person responsible for the triple murder in Carqueiranne, whose photo was published in the newspaper, was present at the Mammouth shop on the day of the slaughter. The pensioner said that this person, Tommy Recco, was suspicious and looked around the shop as if he was looking for someone or something. The pensioner remembered this person because of his sparkling blue eyes.

Again questioned and confused by a witness, Recco denied having been in the Mammouth shop in December 1979. The pensioner later recognized Recco during a recording session.

Two reconstructions were organized: one at the Mammouth store and the other in the villa in Carqueiranne, but these re-enactments brought nothing concrete insofar as Recco brought no element that could explain why he committed the two triple murders.

However, police learned that Recco had delivered a diving suit, as part of his work, to the Mammouth store, and was thus able to spot the cash room and come back another day to steal money. The cash has never been found.

While Recco was awaiting trial, police learned that Antoine Recco, his father, was involved in the disappearance of two 21-year-old girls. In early 1982, rumour has it that Antoine could have been involved in the disappearance of two French tourists in September 1981. The police decided to question him about the missing girls. Antoine Recco denied it, but other police found the swimsuits belonging to the girls on his boat. He recounted how he had met these girls, taking them on his boat for a ride, but when he tried to seduce them, they resisted his advances. He strangled them, weighed them down, and threw their bodies into the sea.

Antoine Recco was sentenced in August 1986 to life imprisonment for these two murders.

== Trial, imprisonment and death ==
Tommy Recco's trial began on 6 June 1983. Mama Recco, as Tommy's mother was nicknamed, and his wife, Chantal Recco, were the only two who believed in his innocence. During the trial, he continued to proclaim his innocence. He was interrogated in particular on the motive for the murder of the girl's father in Carqueiranne. Recco still recognized his impulsive side that probably led him to kill his godfather 23 years earlier. Psychiatrists were asked about Recco's mental state and they said that he was completely sane. His boiling and impulsive character led to a flurry of uncontrolled violence that drove him to murder. Paul Lombard was a supporter of Recco. On 14 June, Recco was sentenced to life imprisonment with a minimum term of 18 years.

Eligible for release since January 1998, Recco submitted multiple applications for parole from 2001 on, but all were summarily rejected. Antoine Recco was released for medical reasons in May 2010, after almost 28 years in prison. He continued to live in Corsica until his death on 19 October 2016.

Recco served his sentence in the prison at Borgo, Haute-Corse, and was one of France's oldest prisoners. After numerous requests for parole and suspension of sentence for health reasons, all of which were rejected, he filed a new application for release under electronic surveillance in May 2017 and October 2021 but did not obtain it.

A referral to the European Court of Human Rights was made on 30 June 2023 and examined in February 2024 on the basis of Article 3 of the Declaration of Human Rights. The court was expected to hand down its decision at the end of 2025. In October 2024, Recco left Borgo Prison to be transferred to the Salon-de-Provence Detention Centre due to cancer, from which he had been suffering for several years. This news disgusted Guy Maurel, who believed that the murderer of his wife should not receive any special treatment.

Recco died in prison on 20 November 2025, at the age of 91.

== Television documentary ==
Recco was featured in "La malédiction des Recco" broadcast in June 2009 and December 2010 in Faites entrer l'accusé presented by Christophe Hondelatte on France 2.

== See also ==
- List of serial killers by country
- List of serial killers by number of victims
