= Hôtel de Ville, La Garde =

Town hall in La Garde, France

Hôtel de Ville
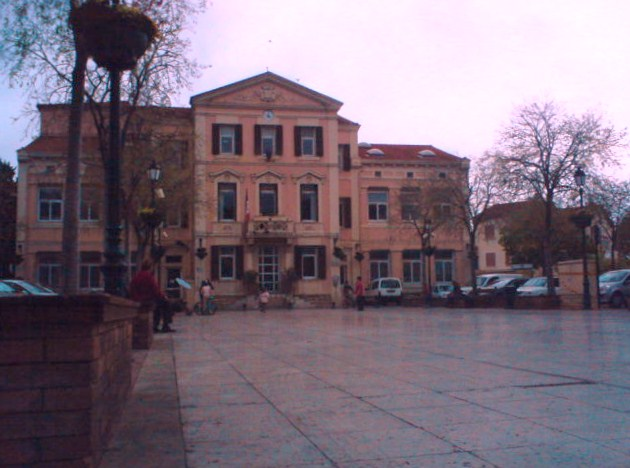
- The main frontage of the Hôtel de Ville in April 2009
- Interactive map of the Hôtel de Ville area

General information
- Type: City hall
- Architectural style: Neoclassical style
- Location: La Garde, France
- Coordinates: 43.1241°N 6.0102°E
- Completed: 1884

Design and construction
- Architect: Sieur Barthélémy

The Hôtel de Ville (French pronunciation: [otɛl də vil], City Hall) is a municipal building in La Garde, Var, in southeastern France, standing on Rue Victor Thouron.

== History ==
The consuls established their first town hall in the former Hôpital du Saint-Esprit (Hospital of the Holy Spirit) on Rue Raul Doumet. The hospital was one of many founded on the initiative of Pope Innocent III in the early 13th century. The consuls acquired it in 1657, but it was burnt down by the troops of Prince Eugene of Savoy in August 1707 during the Siege of Toulon, part of the War of the Spanish Succession. It was rebuilt in 1729 and subsequently served as a school as well as a town hall in the 18th century. After it was no longer required for municipal purposes, it served in a variety of uses including, latterly, as a stained-glass workshop.

In the late 1870s, following significant population growth the town council led by the mayor, Eugène-Fortuné Blanc, decided to commission a more substantial town hall. The site they selected was on the south side of the market square. The building was designed by Sieur Barthélémy in the neoclassical style, built in brick with a cement render finish and was officially opened on 25 November 1884.

The design involved a symmetrical main frontage of 11 bays facing onto the market square, with the central three bays projected forward as a pavilion. The central bay featured a short set of steps leading up to a doorway with a stone surround. There was a French door with an open pediment and a balcony on the first floor, and a casement window on the second floor. The outer bays of the central section were fenestrated in a similar style and the section was flanked by full height pilasters supporting a pediment with a coat of arms in the tympanum. The connecting bays, which flanked the central section, were also three storeys high and fenestrated by casement windows, but the wings of three bays each were of reduced height and were fenestrated by casement windows on the first two floors and by small square windows at attic level. The central block contained the municipal office, while the left-hand wing accommodated the boys' school and the right-hand wing accommodated the girls' school. Internally, the principal room was the Salle du Conseil (council chamber). In the 20th century, a modern extension was built to the rear of the original building with access from Rue Jean-Baptiste-Lavène.

Following the liberation of the town by the 1st Free French Division on 22 August 1944 during the Second World War, a plaque was attached to the façade of the town hall to commemorate the event. A double-sided clock, intended to commemorate the French Revolution, was designed and manufactured by Ets Brillié of Montbrison and installed in front of town hall in July 1989.
