= Métropole Toulon Provence Méditerranée =

Coordinates: 43°7′N 5°57′E

- Métropole

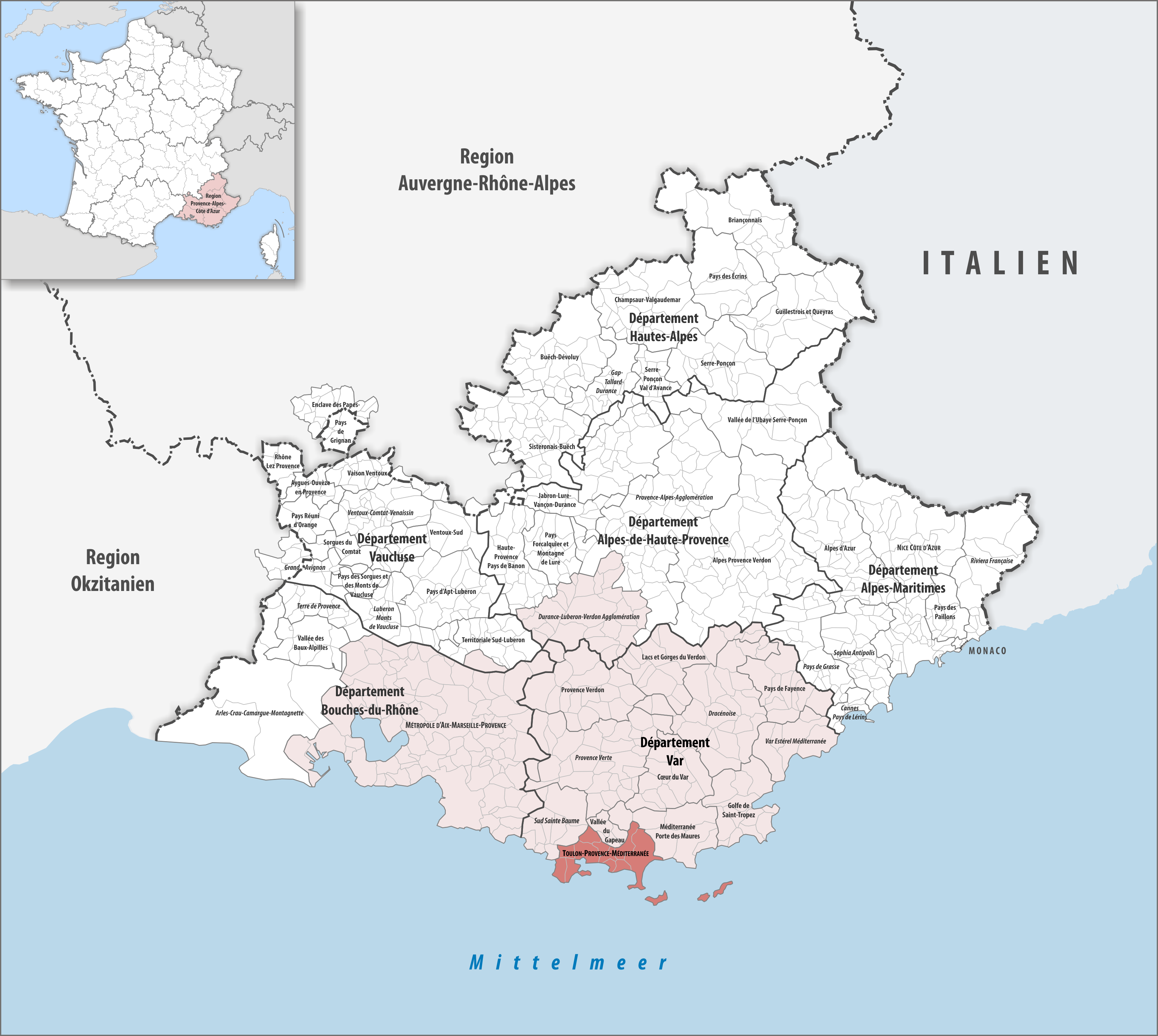
- Location within the Provence-Alpes-Côte d'Azur
- Country: France
- Region: Provence-Alpes-Côte d'Azur
- Department: Var
- No. of communes: {{{nbcomm}}}
- Established: January 2018
- Area: 366.41 km^{2} (141.47 sq mi)
- Population (2018): 438,985
  - Density: 1,198.1/km^{2} (3,103.0/sq mi)
- Website: https://www.metropoletpm.fr

The Métropole Toulon Provence Méditerranée (French pronunciation: [metʁɔpɔl tulɔ̃ pʁɔvɑ̃s meditɛʁane]) is the métropole, an intercommunal structure, centred on the city of Toulon. It is located in the Var department, in the Provence-Alpes-Côte d'Azur region, southeastern France. It was created in January 2018, replacing the communauté d'agglomération that had been created in December 2001. Its area is 366.4 km^{2}. Its population was 438,985 in 2018, of which 176,198 in Toulon proper.

== Composition ==
The métropole consists of the following 12 communes:

1. Carqueiranne
2. La Crau
3. La Garde
4. Hyères
5. Ollioules
6. Le Pradet
7. Le Revest-les-Eaux
8. Saint-Mandrier-sur-Mer
9. La Seyne-sur-Mer
10. Six-Fours-les-Plages
11. Toulon
12. La Valette-du-Var
