= Canton of La Garde =

Coordinates: 43.12°N 6.01°E

The canton of La Garde is an administrative division of the Var department, southeastern France. Its borders were modified at the French canton reorganisation which came into effect in March 2015. Its seat is in La Garde.

It consists of the following communes:

1. Carqueiranne
2. La Garde
3. Le Pradet
