= Métropole =

Administrative entity in France

Métropoles on map

A métropole (French pronunciation: [metʁɔpɔl]; French for "metropolis") is an administrative entity in France, in which several communes cooperate, and which has the right to levy local tax, an établissement public de coopération intercommunale à fiscalité propre. It is the most integrated form of intercommunality in France, more than the communauté urbaine, the communauté d'agglomération and the communauté de communes. The métropoles were created by a law of January 2014.

As of January 2025, there are 19 métropoles, and 2 métropoles with special status: Paris and Marseille (all in metropolitan France). Although the official name of the Metropolis of Lyon contains the word "métropole", legally, it is a territorial collectivity.

== List of Métropoles ==
Name	Seat	Creation	Number of communes	Population (2022)
Bordeaux Métropole	Bordeaux	2015	28	854,949
Brest Métropole	Brest	2015	8	217,444
Clermont Auvergne Métropole	Clermont-Ferrand	2018	21	302,259
Dijon Métropole	Dijon	2017	23	263,672
Grenoble-Alpes Métropole	Grenoble	2015	49	455,436
Métropole Européenne de Lille	Lille	2015	95	1,204,796
Metz Métropole	Metz	2018	46	234,112
Montpellier Méditerranée Métropole	Montpellier	2015	31	523,109
Métropole du Grand Nancy	Nancy	2016	20	262,233
Nantes Métropole	Nantes	2015	24	695,303
Métropole Nice Côte d'Azur	Nice	2011	51	574,284
Orléans Métropole	Orléans	2017	22	299,552
Rennes Métropole	Rennes	2015	43	483,199
Métropole Rouen Normandie	Rouen	2015	71	507,654
Saint-Étienne Métropole	Saint-Étienne	2018	53	412,411
Eurométropole de Strasbourg	Strasbourg	2015	33	522,670
Métropole Toulon Provence Méditerranée	Toulon	2018	12	455,118
Toulouse Métropole	Toulouse	2015	37	842,175
Tours Métropole Val de Loire	Tours	2017	22	304,421
Metropolis with special status
Aix-Marseille-Provence	Marseille	2016	92	1,944,405
Grand Paris	Paris	2016	130	7,163,419
