= Le Pradet =

- Commune
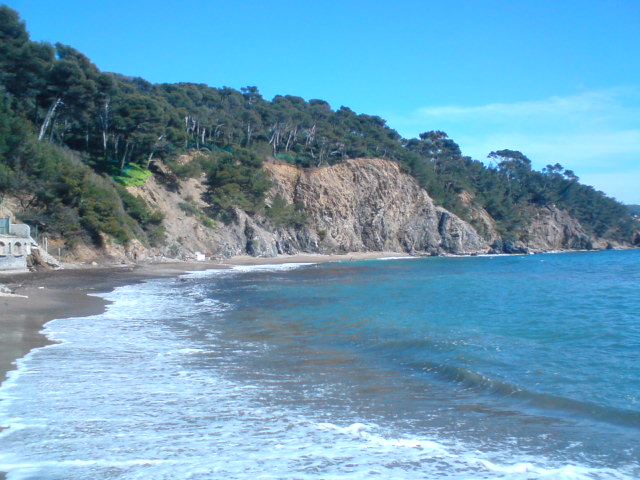
- Les Bonnettes Beach, in Le Pradet

- Coat of arms
- Location of Le Pradet
- Location within France Location within Provence-Alpes-Côte d'Azur
- Coordinates: 43°06′23″N 6°01′26″E
- Country: France
- Region: Provence-Alpes-Côte d'Azur
- Department: Var
- Arrondissement: Toulon
- Canton: La Garde
- Intercommunality: Métropole Toulon Provence Méditerranée

Government
  - Mayor (2020–2026): Hervé Stassinos
- Area^{1}: 9.97 km^{2} (3.85 sq mi)
- Elevation: 80 m (260 ft)
- Highest elevation: 273 m (896 ft)
- Lowest elevation: 0 m (0 ft)
- Population (2023): 10,933
  - Density: 1,100/km^{2} (2,840/sq mi)
- Time zone: UTC+01:00 (CET)
  - Summer (DST): UTC+02:00 (CEST)
- INSEE/Postal code: 83098 /83220
- ^{1} French Land Register data, which excludes lakes, ponds, glaciers > 1 km^{2} (0.386 sq mi or 247 acres) and river estuaries.

Le Pradet (French pronunciation: [lə pʁadɛ]; Occitan: Lo Pradet) is a resort town and commune in the Var department in the Provence-Alpes-Côte d'Azur region in southeastern France.

Olive oil, vegetables and wine grape (including rare Tibouren variety used for rose wine) are produced in the local farms.

== Population ==
Historical population
Year	Pop.	±% p.a.
1968	5,658	—
1975	6,938	+2.96%
1982	7,900	+1.87%
1990	9,704	+2.60%
1999	10,975	+1.38%
2007	10,998	+0.03%
2012	11,336	+0.61%
2017	10,249	−2.00%
2023	10,933	+1.08%
Source: INSEE

== International relations ==
Le Pradet, is twinned with Gelnica, Slovakia.

== See also ==
- Communes of the Var department
