= La Garde, Var =

La Garde La Garda (Occitan)
- Commune
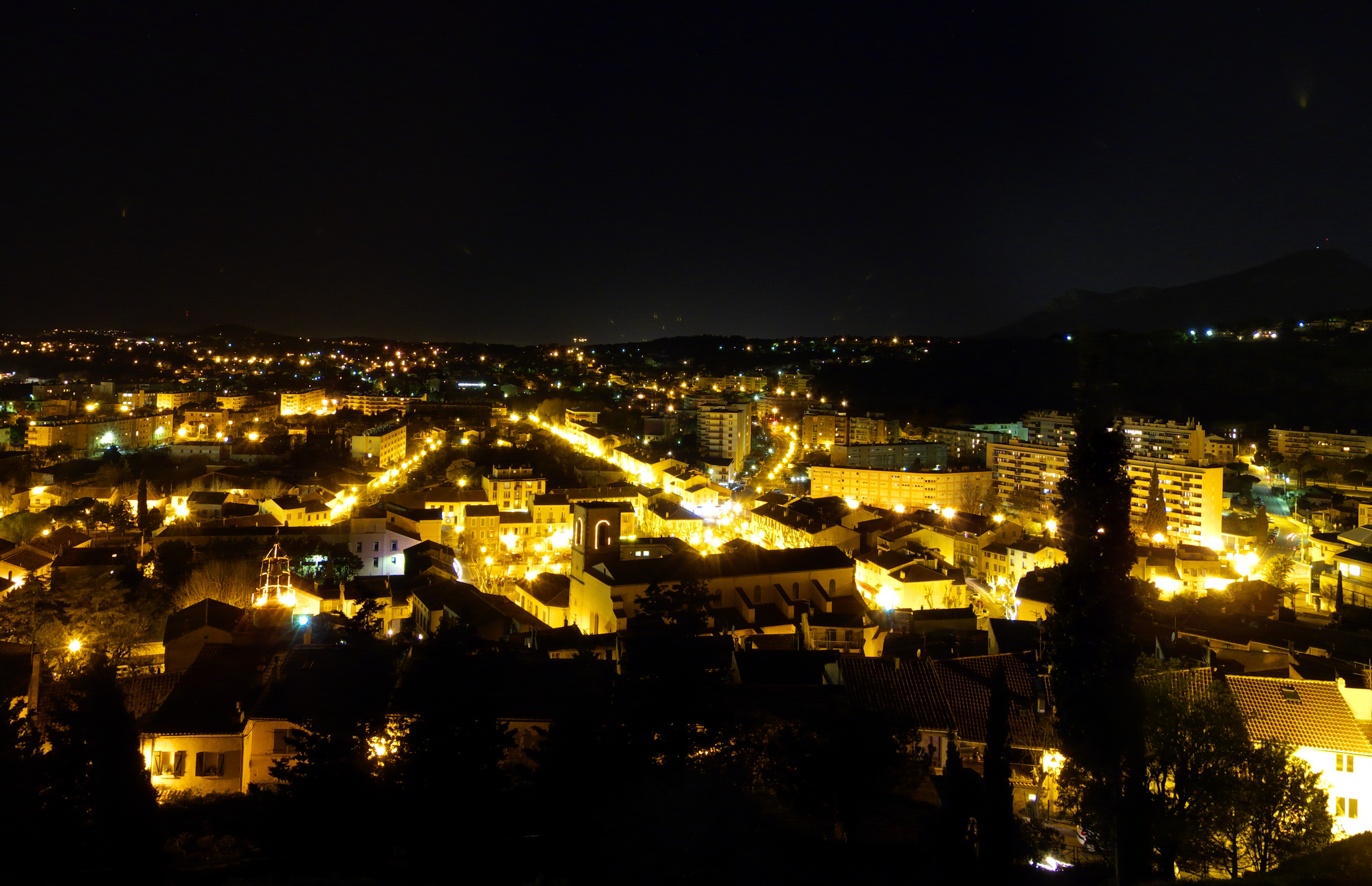
- A night view of La Garde in 2008

- Coat of arms
- Location of La Garde
- Location within France Location within Provence-Alpes-Côte d'Azur
- Coordinates: 43°07′32″N 6°00′39″E
- Country: France
- Region: Provence-Alpes-Côte d'Azur
- Department: Var
- Arrondissement: Toulon
- Canton: La Garde
- Intercommunality: Métropole Toulon Provence Méditerranée

Government
  - Mayor (2022–2026): Hélène Bill (DVD)
- Area^{1}: 15.54 km^{2} (6.00 sq mi)
- Elevation: 1 m (3.3 ft)
- Highest elevation: 206 m (676 ft)
- Lowest elevation: 0 m (0 ft)
- Population (2023): 26,476
  - Density: 1,704/km^{2} (4,413/sq mi)
- Demonym: Gardéens
- Time zone: UTC+01:00 (CET)
  - Summer (DST): UTC+02:00 (CEST)
- INSEE/Postal code: 83062 /83130
- ^{1} French Land Register data, which excludes lakes, ponds, glaciers > 1 km^{2} (0.386 sq mi or 247 acres) and river estuaries.

La Garde (French pronunciation: [la ɡaʁd]; Provençal Occitan: La Garda) is a seaside commune in the Var department in the Provence-Alpes-Côte d'Azur region in Southeastern France.

It is located in the Métropole Toulon Provence Méditerranée, east of the city of Toulon.

== History ==
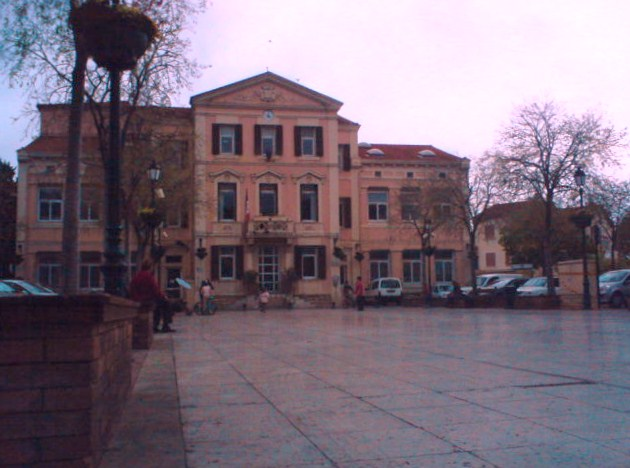
The Hôtel de Ville

The name derives from the town's ancient origins, meaning "The Guard". It is mentioned in 1056, when its castle was a fief of the Bishops of Toulon; they kept it until the 13th century, when it was handed over to the Castellanes, then the lords of Glandevès and the Thomas. Today only a tower and the chapel remain of the castle.

La Garde was repeatedly invaded during the French Wars of Religion. In 1707 it was sacked by Savoyard troops.

The Hôtel de Ville was completed in 1884.

== Demographics ==
Historical population

| Year | Pop. | ±% p.a. |
|---|---|---|
| 1793 | 1,050 | — |
| 1800 | 2,263 | +11.59% |
| 1806 | 2,288 | +0.18% |
| 1821 | 2,329 | +0.12% |
| 1831 | 2,353 | +0.10% |
| 1836 | 2,572 | +1.80% |
| 1841 | 2,321 | −2.03% |
| 1846 | 2,429 | +0.91% |
| 1851 | 2,875 | +3.43% |
| 1856 | 2,568 | −2.23% |
| 1861 | 2,572 | +0.03% |
| 1866 | 2,695 | +0.94% |
| 1872 | 2,852 | +0.95% |
| 1876 | 2,986 | +1.15% |
| 1881 | 2,864 | −0.83% |
| 1886 | 3,104 | +1.62% |
| 1891 | 3,418 | +1.95% |
| 1896 | 2,398 | −6.84% |
| 1901 | 2,791 | +3.08% |

| Year | Pop. | ±% p.a. |
|---|---|---|
| 1906 | 2,961 | +1.19% |
| 1911 | 3,037 | +0.51% |
| 1921 | 2,827 | −0.71% |
| 1926 | 3,048 | +1.52% |
| 1931 | 3,095 | +0.31% |
| 1936 | 3,792 | +4.15% |
| 1946 | 4,066 | +0.70% |
| 1954 | 5,021 | +2.67% |
| 1962 | 6,273 | +2.82% |
| 1968 | 9,629 | +7.40% |
| 1975 | 15,506 | +7.04% |
| 1982 | 19,805 | +3.56% |
| 1990 | 22,412 | +1.56% |
| 1999 | 25,329 | +1.37% |
| 2007 | 25,551 | +0.11% |
| 2012 | 25,736 | +0.14% |
| 2017 | 25,126 | −0.48% |
| 2023 | 26,476 | +0.88% |

Source: EHESS and INSEE (1968–2023)

== International relations ==
La Garde, Var is twinned with:

- Montesarchio, Italy
- Spa, Belgium

== See also ==
- Communes of the Var department
