= Carqueiranne =

Carqueiranne Carcairana (Occitan)
- Commune
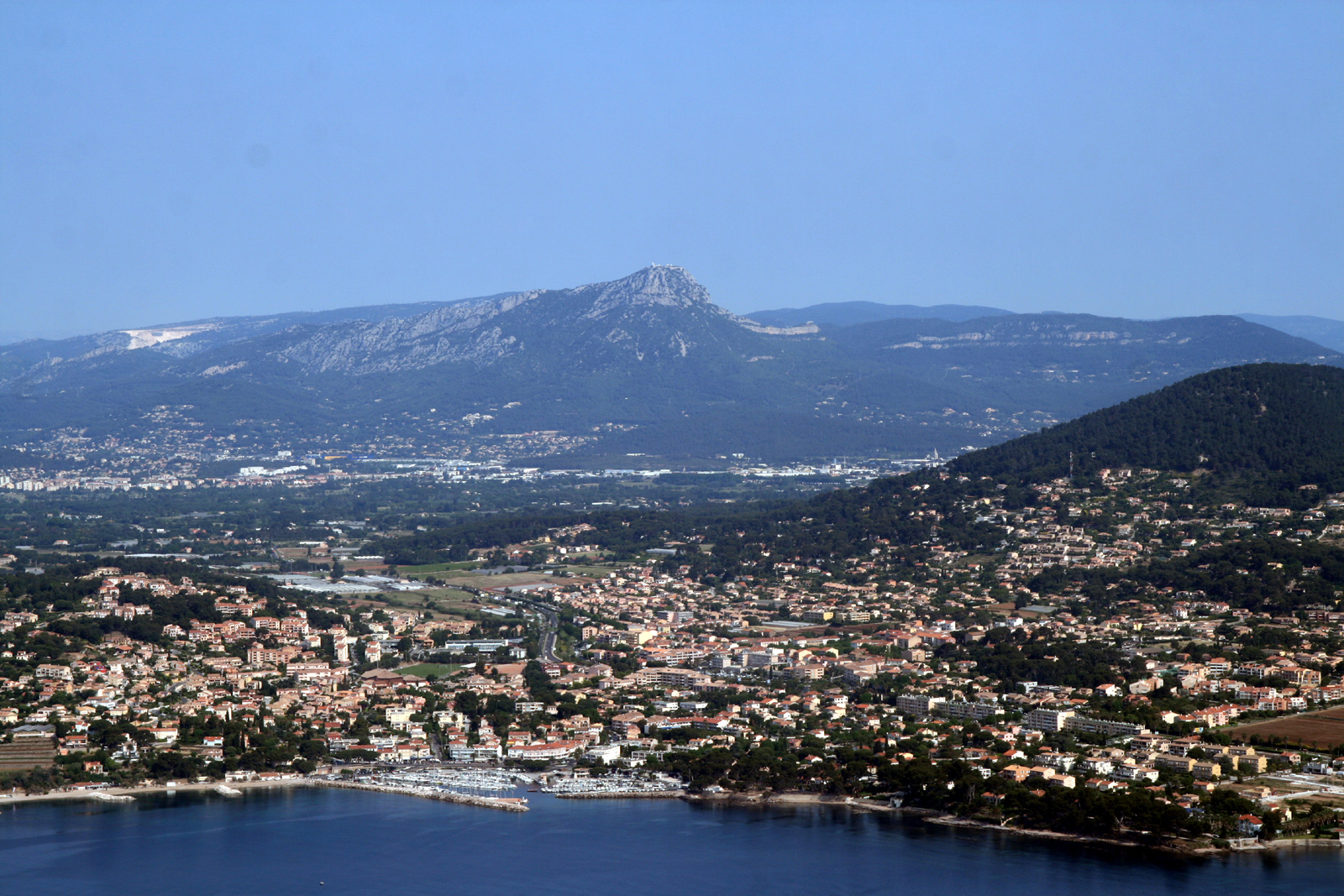
- An aerial view of the town

- Coat of arms
- Location of Carqueiranne
- Location within France Location within Provence-Alpes-Côte d'Azur
- Coordinates: 43°05′45″N 6°04′27″E
- Country: France
- Region: Provence-Alpes-Côte d'Azur
- Department: Var
- Arrondissement: Toulon
- Canton: La Garde
- Intercommunality: Métropole Toulon Provence Méditerranée

Government
  - Mayor (2020–2026): Arnaud Latil
- Area^{1}: 14.48 km^{2} (5.59 sq mi)
- Elevation: 26 m (85 ft)
- Highest elevation: 305 m (1,001 ft)
- Lowest elevation: 0 m (0 ft)
- Population (2023): 9,408
  - Density: 649.7/km^{2} (1,683/sq mi)
- Demonym(s): Carqueirannais, Carqueirannaise (French)
- Time zone: UTC+01:00 (CET)
  - Summer (DST): UTC+02:00 (CEST)
- INSEE/Postal code: 83034 /83320
- ^{1} French Land Register data, which excludes lakes, ponds, glaciers > 1 km^{2} (0.386 sq mi or 247 acres) and river estuaries.

Carqueiranne (French: [kaʁkeʁan], locally [kaʁkɛˈʁanə]; Occitan: Carcairana [kaɾkajˈɾanɔ] or Carqueirana [kaɾkejˈɾanɔ]) is a commune in the Var department, administrative region of Provence-Alpes-Côte d'Azur (historically Provence), Southeastern France.

It is known now as a tourist seaside resort with good windsurfing nearby, at Almanarre Beach.

== Demographics ==
Historical population
Year	Pop.	±% p.a.
1968	4,449	—
1975	5,131	+2.06%
1982	6,199	+2.74%
1990	7,118	+1.74%
1999	8,436	+1.91%
2007	9,630	+1.67%
2012	9,899	+0.55%
2017	9,700	−0.41%
2023	9,408	−0.51%
Source: INSEE

== Saint-Exupéry ==
The town has a literary claim to fame as well. In early August 1944, an unidentifiable body wearing French military colours was found near here, which was long believed to be that of famous novelist Antoine de Saint-Exupéry, author of The Little Prince.

In 1998, a bracelet known to be his, with a fragment of cloth still attached, was found in the sea east of Riou Island (south of Marseille). In 2000, a crashed P-38 Lightning was found in the seabed off the coast of Marseille, near where the bracelet was found, and it was confirmed to be the one that Saint-Exupéry was flying.

However, it remains plausible that ocean currents could have carried the body from the crash site to Carqueiranne - a distance less than 80 kilometres (50 mi) by sea - over the course of several days, which is the time difference between the crash on 31 July 1944, and the discovery of the body.

== See also ==
- Communes of the Var department
