= Seillans =

Seillans Selhan (Occitan)
- Commune
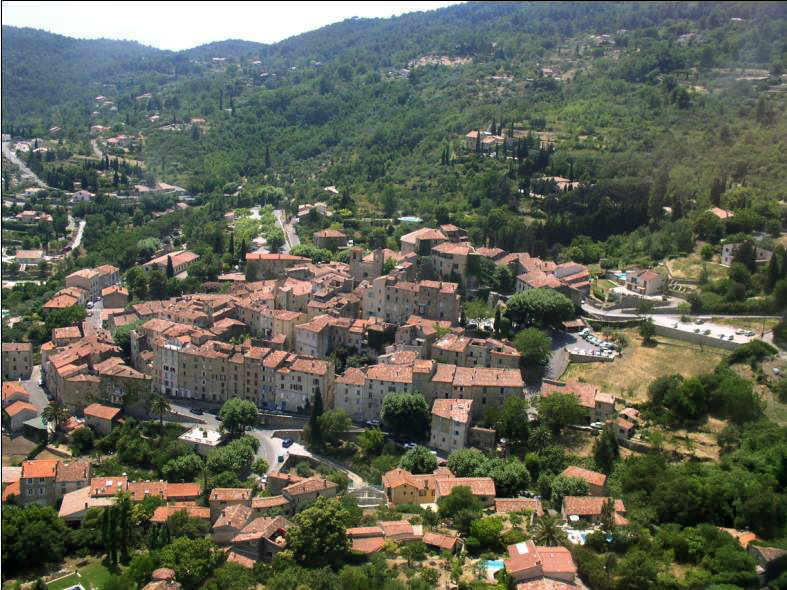
- An overhead view of Seillans

- Coat of arms
- Location of Seillans
- Location within France Location within Provence-Alpes-Côte d'Azur
- Coordinates: 43°37′59″N 6°37′59″E
- Country: France
- Region: Provence-Alpes-Côte d'Azur
- Department: Var
- Arrondissement: Draguignan
- Canton: Roquebrune-sur-Argens
- Intercommunality: Pays de Fayence

Government
  - Mayor (2020–2026): René Ugo
- Area^{1}: 88.66 km^{2} (34.23 sq mi)
- Elevation: 366 m (1,201 ft)
- Population (2023): 2,941
  - Density: 33.17/km^{2} (85.91/sq mi)
- Demonym: Seillanais
- Time zone: UTC+01:00 (CET)
  - Summer (DST): UTC+02:00 (CEST)
- INSEE/Postal code: 83124 /83440
- Website: www.seillans.fr
- ^{1} French Land Register data, which excludes lakes, ponds, glaciers > 1 km^{2} (0.386 sq mi or 247 acres) and river estuaries.

Seillans (French pronunciation: [sɛjɑ̃]; Occitan: Selhan) is a commune in the Var department in the Provence-Alpes-Côte d'Azur region in southeastern France.

It is a village perché (perched hill-top village) overlooking the plain between the southern Alps and the Esterel, which borders the sea between Cannes and Saint-Raphaël. It has been recognized by Les Plus Beaux Villages de France.

Seillans has a steeply-inclined medieval centre, accessible only on foot, and a number of small squares and old buildings. It is the westernmost of a line of such towns and villages (including Montauroux, Callian, Tourrettes and Fayence) that face south and attract tourists. Other local attractions include the nearby Lac de Saint-Cassien.

Seillans is also a destination for holiday-makers, retirees and second-home owners from other parts of France and northern Europe. Seillans features a castle and C13 church at its summit. Nearby are rustic chapels, vineyards, forests and olive groves.

Seillans has an annual pottery market and many concerts and events throughout the year, as well as the annual international Musique-Cordiale Festival, a fortnight when the church, the salle polyvalente and outdoor venues resound to a variety of high quality classical, choral and jazz music from international artists, soloists, choirs and orchestras each August, when the area is at its most popular.

In the late 1960s and early 1970s Max Ernst and Dorothea Tanning made Seillans their home. The village hosts a substantial Max Ernst collection, including several sculptures in open air.

== Geography ==
=== Climate ===
Seillans has a hot-summer Mediterranean climate (Köppen climate classification Csa). The average annual temperature in Seillans is 14.8 °C (58.6 °F). The average annual rainfall is 914.4 mm (36.00 in) with November as the wettest month. The temperatures are highest on average in August, at around 23.8 °C (74.8 °F), and lowest in January, at around 7.0 °C (44.6 °F). The highest temperature ever recorded in Seillans was 39.7 °C (103.5 °F) on 1 August 2024; the coldest temperature ever recorded was −8.6 °C (16.5 °F) on 20 December 2009.

Climate data for Seillans (1991−2020 normals, extremes 1997−present)
Month	Jan	Feb	Mar	Apr	May	Jun	Jul	Aug	Sep	Oct	Nov	Dec	Year
Record high °C (°F)	23.6 (74.5)	27.0 (80.6)	26.0 (78.8)	29.2 (84.6)	34.8 (94.6)	39.0 (102.2)	38.4 (101.1)	39.7 (103.5)	33.9 (93.0)	32.0 (89.6)	26.0 (78.8)	22.4 (72.3)	39.7 (103.5)
Mean daily maximum °C (°F)	12.2 (54.0)	13.3 (55.9)	16.3 (61.3)	19.3 (66.7)	23.4 (74.1)	28.2 (82.8)	31.2 (88.2)	31.3 (88.3)	26.6 (79.9)	21.3 (70.3)	15.7 (60.3)	12.6 (54.7)	21.0 (69.8)
Daily mean °C (°F)	7.0 (44.6)	7.5 (45.5)	10.3 (50.5)	13.1 (55.6)	16.9 (62.4)	21.1 (70.0)	23.7 (74.7)	23.8 (74.8)	19.8 (67.6)	15.7 (60.3)	10.8 (51.4)	7.7 (45.9)	14.8 (58.6)
Mean daily minimum °C (°F)	1.9 (35.4)	1.8 (35.2)	4.2 (39.6)	7.0 (44.6)	10.4 (50.7)	14.1 (57.4)	16.1 (61.0)	16.3 (61.3)	13.1 (55.6)	10.1 (50.2)	5.8 (42.4)	2.7 (36.9)	8.6 (47.5)
Record low °C (°F)	−7.5 (18.5)	−8.4 (16.9)	−6.3 (20.7)	−2.4 (27.7)	2.6 (36.7)	5.0 (41.0)	7.4 (45.3)	9.2 (48.6)	3.7 (38.7)	−2.6 (27.3)	−5.0 (23.0)	−8.6 (16.5)	−8.6 (16.5)
Average precipitation mm (inches)	69.2 (2.72)	57.1 (2.25)	62.6 (2.46)	82.8 (3.26)	73.3 (2.89)	54.6 (2.15)	17.6 (0.69)	33.0 (1.30)	70.0 (2.76)	126.8 (4.99)	165.4 (6.51)	102.0 (4.02)	914.4 (36.00)
Average precipitation days (≥ 1.0 mm)	5.9	5.3	6.3	7.7	6.5	4.3	2.4	3.3	4.9	7.0	8.6	6.5	68.6
Source: Météo-France

== Population ==
Historical population
Year	Pop.	±% p.a.
1968	1,147	—
1975	1,211	+0.78%
1982	1,609	+4.14%
1990	1,793	+1.36%
1999	2,115	+1.85%
2007	2,543	+2.33%
2012	2,489	−0.43%
2017	2,669	+1.41%
2023	2,941	+1.63%
Source: INSEE

== See also ==
- Communes of the Var department
