= 2015 Tour du Haut Var =

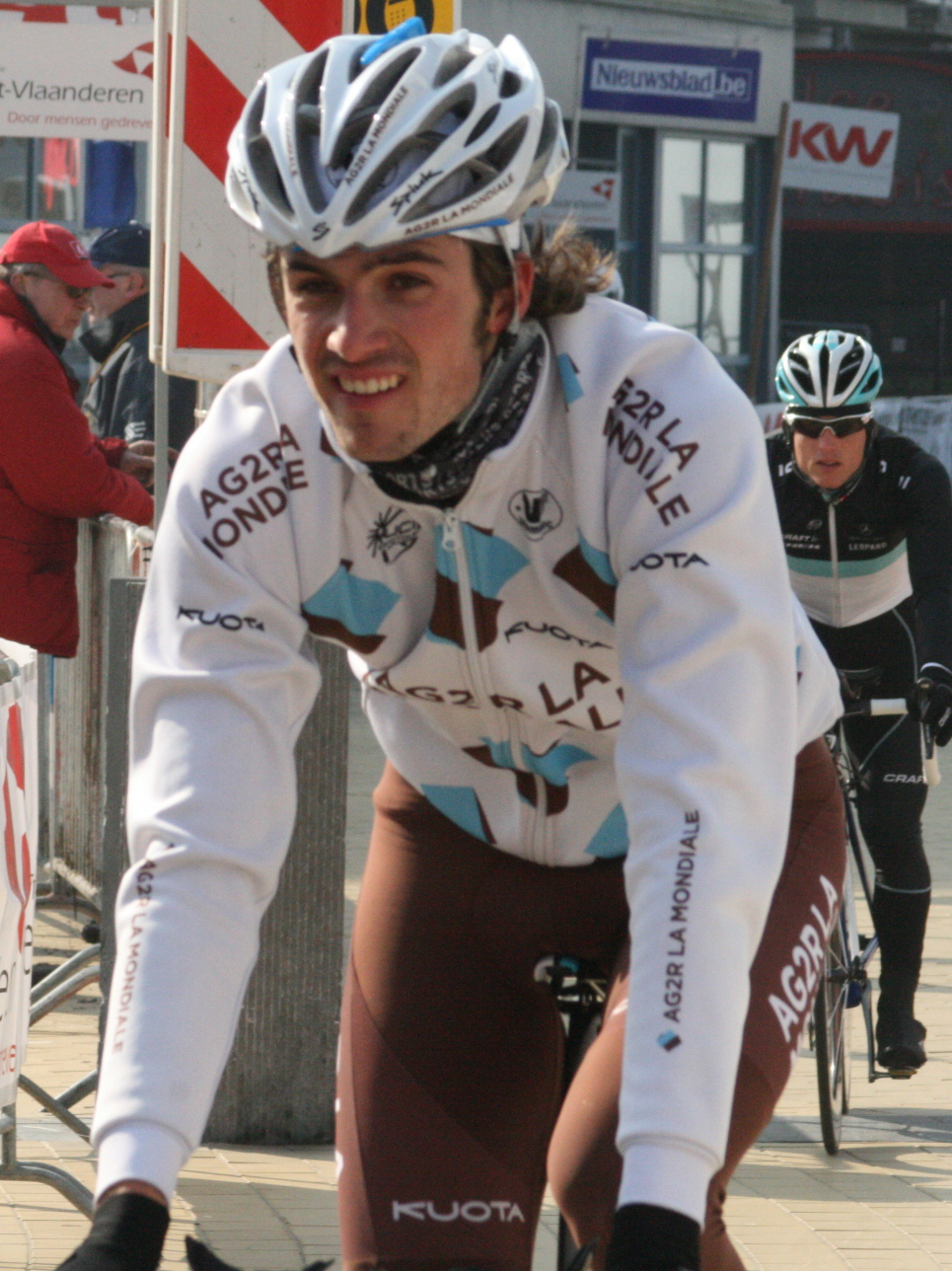
- Ben Gastauer, overall winner of the 2015 Tour du Haut Var

Race details
- Dates: 21–22 February 2015
- Stages: 2
- Distance: 362.5 km (225.2 mi)
- Winning time: 9h 14' 21"

Results
Jersey awarded to the overall winner	Winner	Ben Gastauer (LUX)	(AG2R La Mondiale)
	Second	Philippe Gilbert (BEL)	(BMC Racing Team)
	Third	Jonathan Hivert (FRA)	(Bretagne–Séché Environnement)
Jersey awarded to the points classification winner	Points	Philippe Gilbert (BEL)	(BMC Racing Team)
Jersey awarded to the mountains classification winner	Mountains	Ignatas Konovalovas (LIT)	(Team Marseille 13 KTM)
Jersey awarded to the young rider classification winner	Young rider	Quentin Pacher (FRA)	(Armée de Terre)
	Team	Bretagne–Séché Environnement	

The 2015 Tour du Haut Var was the 47th edition of the Tour du Haut Var road cycling stage race, held in the Provence region of France. It was rated as a 2.1 event as part of the 2015 UCI Europe Tour, and consisted of two stages over two days, from 21 to 22 February 2015.

Historically, the Tour du Haut Var was the third of three early-season French races, following the Étoile de Bessèges and the Tour Méditerranéen, but for the second year running the Tour Méditerranéen was cancelled due to financial problems, so the Tour du Haut Var came after a two-week break in French cycling.

The 2015 race was particularly notable for returning to the difficult terrain that had been a feature of the race in its early years. In contrast to most stage races, it favoured classics riders rather than pure climbing specialists, and was seen as excellent preparation for the classics season.

The first stage of the race was won from the breakaway by Ben Gastauer (AG2R La Mondiale), who was able to defend his race lead in the second stage and take the overall victory in the race. These were the first victories of his professional career. The second stage was won by Luka Mezgec (Team Giant–Alpecin). Philippe Gilbert (BMC Racing Team), who finished on the podium both days, won the points classification. The mountains prize was won by Ignatas Konovalovas (Team Marseille 13 KTM) and the best young rider was Quentin Pacher (Armée de Terre). The best team was Bretagne–Séché Environnement.

== Preview ==
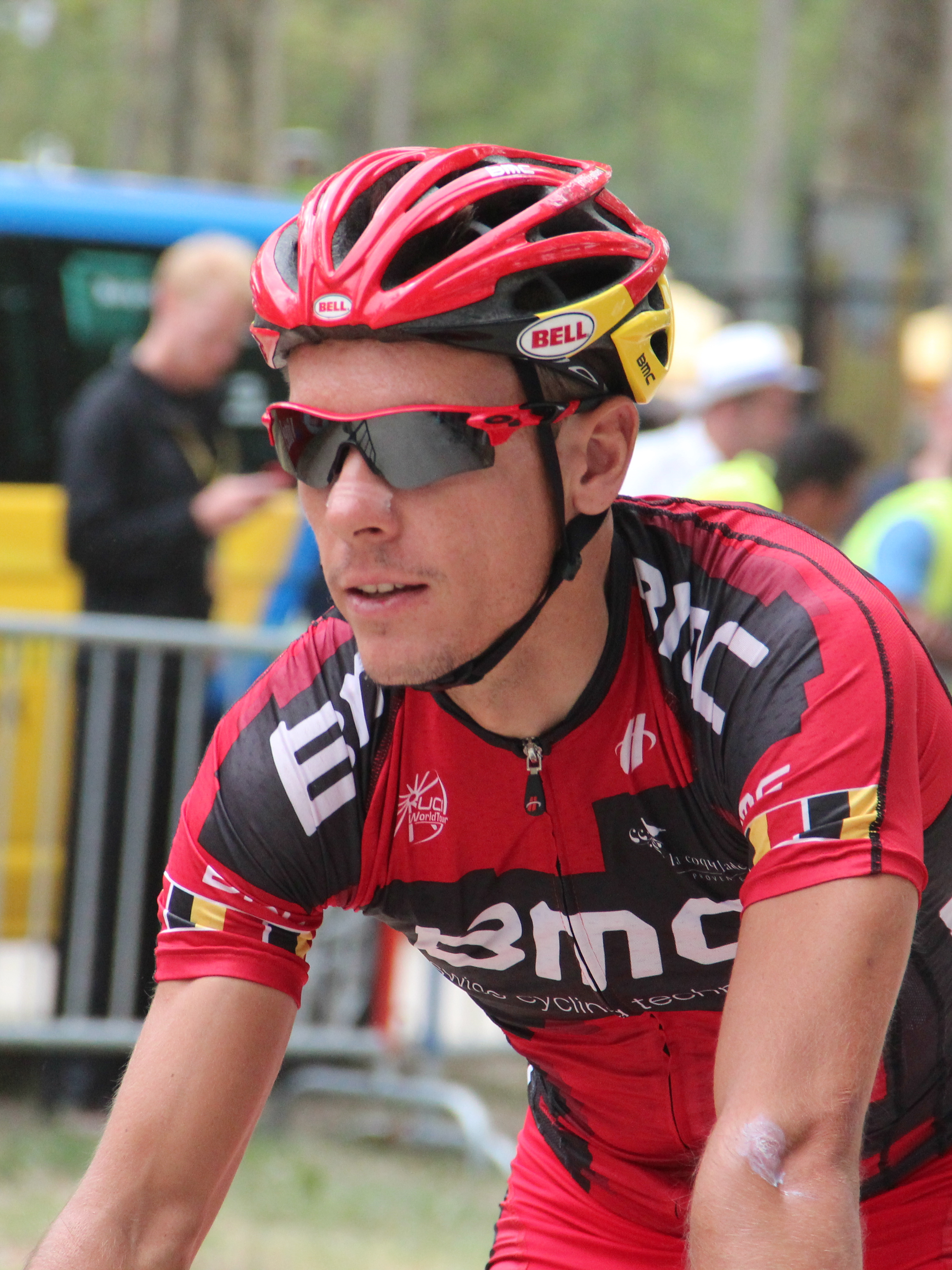
Philippe Gilbert, a former champion of the Tour du Haut Var and one of the pre-race favourites in 2015

The 2014 champion was Carlos Betancur (Ag2r–La Mondiale), but he was not selected for the 2015 edition, still being far from the form he had had in the early part of 2014. However, three former champions were present, including Philippe Gilbert (BMC Racing Team), Davide Rebellin (CCC–Sprandi–Polkowice) and Thomas Voeckler (Team Europcar). Gilbert was considered one of the major favourites for the race, while AG2R La Mondiale's Samuel Dumoulin and Bretagne–Séché Environnement's Jonathan Hivert were also expected to ride well.

== Teams ==
20 teams were selected to take place in the 2015 edition, including six UCI WorldTeams.

- AG2R La Mondiale
- Androni Giocattoli
- Auber 93
- BMC Racing Team
- Bretagne–Séché Environnement
- CCC–Sprandi–Polkowice
- Cofidis
- Cult Energy Pro Cycling
- Armée de Terre
- FDJ
- IAM Cycling
- Roubaix–Lille Métropole
- Team Europcar
- Team Frøy–Bianchi
- Team Giant–Alpecin
- Team Katusha
- Team Marseille 13 KTM
- Veranclassic–Ekoi
- Verandas Willems
- Wallonie-Bruxelles

== Route ==
The terrain of the race was expected to be more challenging than in other recent editions and both stages were expected to suit the puncheurs rather than the sprinters. The first stage took the riders across several categorised climbs. The penultimate climb was the difficult ascent of the Mur de Montauroux (the "Wall of Montauroux"), which had sections of 22% incline, before finishing with the steep climb to Seillans. The second stage took the riders across several more difficult climbs, including the Côte des Tuilières 20 kilometres (12 miles) before the finish.

Stage	Date	Route	Distance	Type	Winner
1	21 February	Le Cannet-des-Maures to Seillans	164.6 km (102 mi)	Hilly stage	Ben Gastauer (LUX)
2	22 February	Draguignan to Draguignan	197.9 km (123 mi)	Hilly stage	Luka Mezgec (SLO)

== Stages ==
=== Stage 1 ===
21 February 2015 — Le Cannet-des-Maures to Seillans, 164.6 km (102 mi)

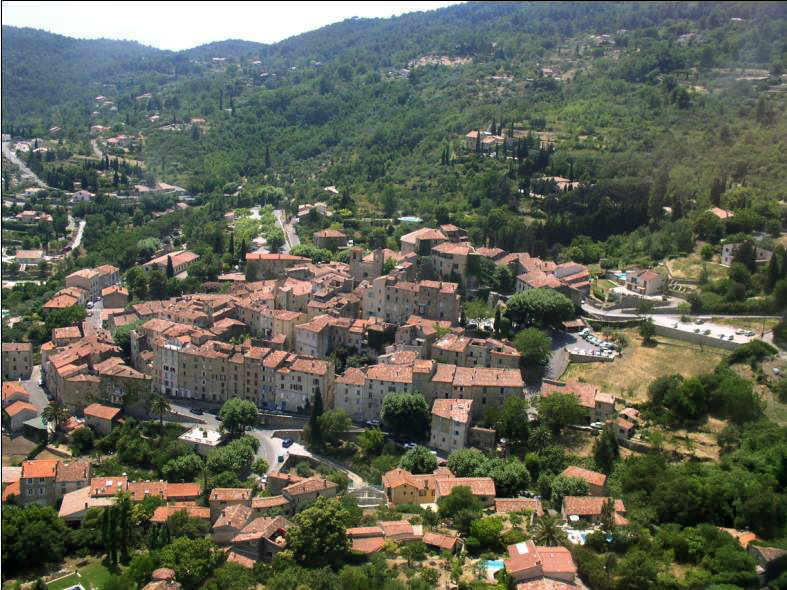
Seillans, the finish of stage 1

Stage 1 was a 164.6-kilometre (102-mile) route from Le Cannet-des-Maures to Seillans. The route was generally hilly and generally used narrow roads. There were four climbs in the first part of the stage, before entering a difficult final section. This included the steep Mur de Montauroux with 15.5 kilometres (10 miles) remaining, with the descent followed by a section of mild climbing and a steep incline to the finish.

The day's early break was formed by Ben Gastauer (AG2R La Mondiale), Ignatas Konovalovas (Team Marseille 13 KTM), Thomas Vaubourzeix (Veranclassic–Ekoi), Roy Curvers (Team Giant–Alpecin) and Loïc Chetout (Cofidis). They never built a lead of more than 4' 30", with several of the teams in the peloton chasing hard. Chetout dropped out of the break, but the remaining riders were able to maintain a decent advantage over the chasing pack. At the Mur de Montauroux, they still had a lead of two minutes. Gastauer dropped the remaining riders on the climb and pressed on alone. He admitted after the stage that it had not been his intention to attempt to win the race from the breakaway, but he pushed on, estimating that the peloton behind would be tired. He still had several seconds in hand as he reached the final climb into Seillans and was able to hold the peloton off with a seven-second advantage at the finish line, with Jonathan Hivert second and Philippe Gilbert third.

Stage 1 result and General classification after Stage 1
Rank	Rider	Team	Time
1	Ben Gastauer (LUX)	AG2R La Mondiale	4h 11' 15"
2	Jonathan Hivert (FRA)	Bretagne–Séché Environnement	+ 7"
3	Philippe Gilbert (BEL)	BMC Racing Team	+ 7"
4	Fabian Wegmann (GER)	Cult Energy Pro Cycling	+ 7"
5	Christophe Laporte (FRA)	Cofidis	+ 7"
6	Simon Špilak (SLO)	Team Katusha	+ 7"
7	Alexey Tsatevich (RUS)	Team Katusha	+ 7"
8	Mathieu Ladagnous (FRA)	FDJ	+ 7"
9	Linus Gerdemann (GER)	Cult Energy Pro Cycling	+ 7"
10	Ángel Vicioso (ESP)	Team Katusha	+ 7"

=== Stage 2 ===
22 February 2015 — Draguignan to Draguignan, 197.9 km (123 mi)

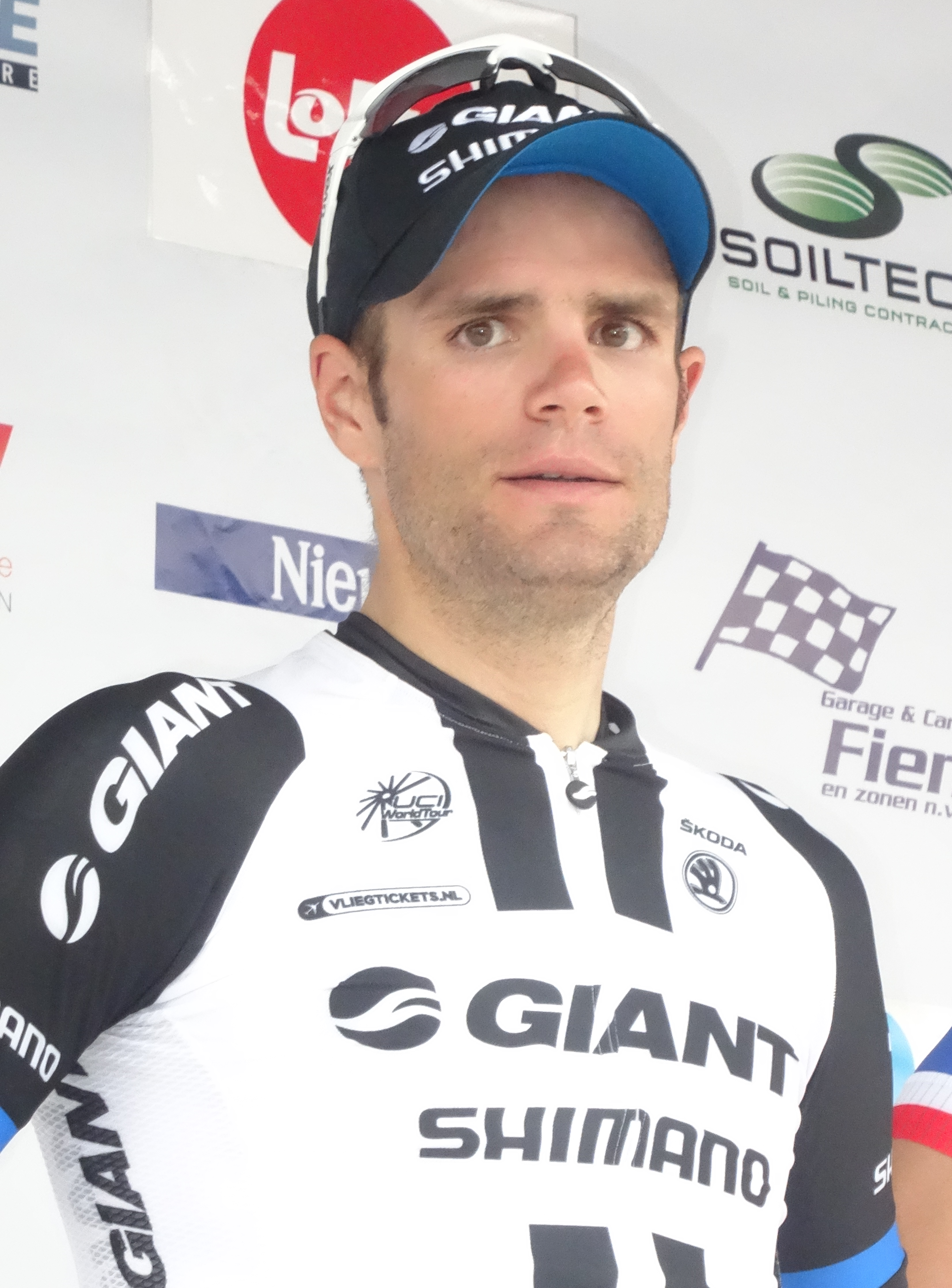
Luka Mezgec, winner of stage 2

Stage 2 was a hilly route around Draguignan. The 197.9-kilometre (123.0-mile) route involved several circuits around the town with six classified climbs. The last of these was the first-category Côte des Tuilières, which included sections of 22% and came 15 kilometres (9 miles) before the finish.

The stage was raced briskly. After 50 kilometres (31 miles) of racing, a nine-man breakaway went away, with AG2R La Mondiale leading the chase in defence of Ben Gastauer's yellow jersey. The breakaway riders were Johan Le Bon (FDJ), Maxim Belkov (Team Katusha), Yannick Martinez (Team Europcar), Anthony Turgis (Cofidis), Nikolay Mihaylov (CCC–Sprandi–Polkowice), Ignatas Konovalovas (Team Marseille 13 KTM), Julien Guay (Auber 93), Antoine Demoitié (Wallonie-Bruxelles) and Serge Dewortelaer (Veranclassic–Ekoi). Turgis attempted to drive the pace on the climb of Col de la Grange 70 kilometres (43 miles) before the finish, but he was not able to distance the peloton. The last of the escapees to be caught was Le Bon, who rode solo into the final 20 kilometres (12 miles) with a lead of over a minute. He was caught soon afterwards, as the peloton reached the Côte des Tuilières.

On the climb, Davide Rebellin (CCC–Sprandi–Polkowice), a former champion in the race, attacked along with Julien Loubet Team Marseille 13 KTM, but they were caught by AG2R La Mondiale shortly after the summit. Luka Mezgec (Team Giant–Alpecin) was among the riders to be dropped on the climb, but he was able to bridge across from the chase group into the peloton, now reduced to 30 riders. His teammate Chad Haga led him out in the sprint, and he was able to beat Philippe Gilbert (BMC Racing Team) to the line, with Baptiste Planckaert (Roubaix–Lille Métropole) in third place. Gastauer finished in the peloton and took the overall victory, the first stage race win of his professional career.

Stage 2 result
Rank	Rider	Team	Time
1	Luka Mezgec (SLO)	Team Giant–Alpecin	5h 03' 06"
2	Philippe Gilbert (BEL)	BMC Racing Team	+ 0"
3	Baptiste Planckaert (BEL)	Roubaix–Lille Métropole	+ 0"
4	Mathieu Ladagnous (FRA)	FDJ	+ 0"
5	Julien El Fares (FRA)	Team Marseille 13 KTM	+ 0"
6	Brent Bookwalter (USA)	BMC Racing Team	+ 0"
7	Jonathan Hivert (FRA)	Bretagne–Séché Environnement	+ 0"
8	Rudy Molard (FRA)	Cofidis	+ 0"
9	Alexis Vuillermoz (FRA)	AG2R La Mondiale	+ 0"
10	Alexey Tsatevich (RUS)	Team Katusha	+ 0"

Final general classification
Rank	Rider	Team	Time
1	Ben Gastauer (LUX)	AG2R La Mondiale	9h 14' 21"
2	Philippe Gilbert (BEL)	BMC Racing Team	+ 7"
3	Jonathan Hivert (FRA)	Bretagne–Séché Environnement	+ 7"
4	Mathieu Ladagnous (FRA)	FDJ	+ 7"
5	Baptiste Planckaert (BEL)	Roubaix–Lille Métropole	+ 7"
6	Alexey Tsatevich (RUS)	Team Katusha	+ 7"
7	Julien El Fares (FRA)	Team Marseille 13 KTM	+ 7"
8	Davide Rebellin (ITA)	CCC–Sprandi–Polkowice	+ 7"
9	Alexis Vuillermoz (FRA)	AG2R La Mondiale	+ 7"
10	Yoann Bagot (FRA)	Cofidis	+ 7"

== Classification leadership table ==
In the 2015 Tour du Haut Var, four different jerseys were awarded. For the general classification, calculated by adding each cyclist's finishing times on each stage, the leader received a yellow jersey. This classification was considered the most important of the 2015 Tour du Haut Var, and the winner of the classification was considered the winner of the race.

Additionally, there was a points classification, which awarded a green jersey. In the points classification, cyclists received points for finishing in the top 15 in a mass-start stage. For winning a stage, a rider earned 25 points, with 20 for second, 16 for third, 14 for fourth, 12 for fifth, 10 for sixth, then 1 point fewer per place down to 1 for 15th place. Points towards the classification could also be accrued at intermediate sprint points during each stage. There was also a mountains classification, the leadership of which was marked by a red jersey. In the mountains classification, points were won by reaching the top of a climb before other cyclists, with more points available for the higher-categorised climbs.

The fourth jersey represented the young rider classification, marked by a white jersey. This was decided in the same way as the general classification, but only riders born after 1 January 1991 were eligible to be ranked in the classification. There was also a classification for teams, in which the times of the best three cyclists per team on each stage were added together; the leading team at the end of the race was the team with the lowest total time.

Stage	Winner	General classification	Points classification	Mountains classification	Young rider classification	Teams classification
1	Ben Gastauer	Ben Gastauer	Ben Gastauer	Thomas Vaubourzeix	Christophe Laporte	AG2R La Mondiale
2	Luka Mezgec	Ben Gastauer	Philippe Gilbert	Ignatas Konovalovas	Quentin Pacher	Bretagne–Séché Environnement
Final		Ben Gastauer	Philippe Gilbert	Ignatas Konovalovas	Quentin Pacher	Bretagne–Séché Environnement
