= Lamination (geology) =

Thin layers present in sedimentary rock

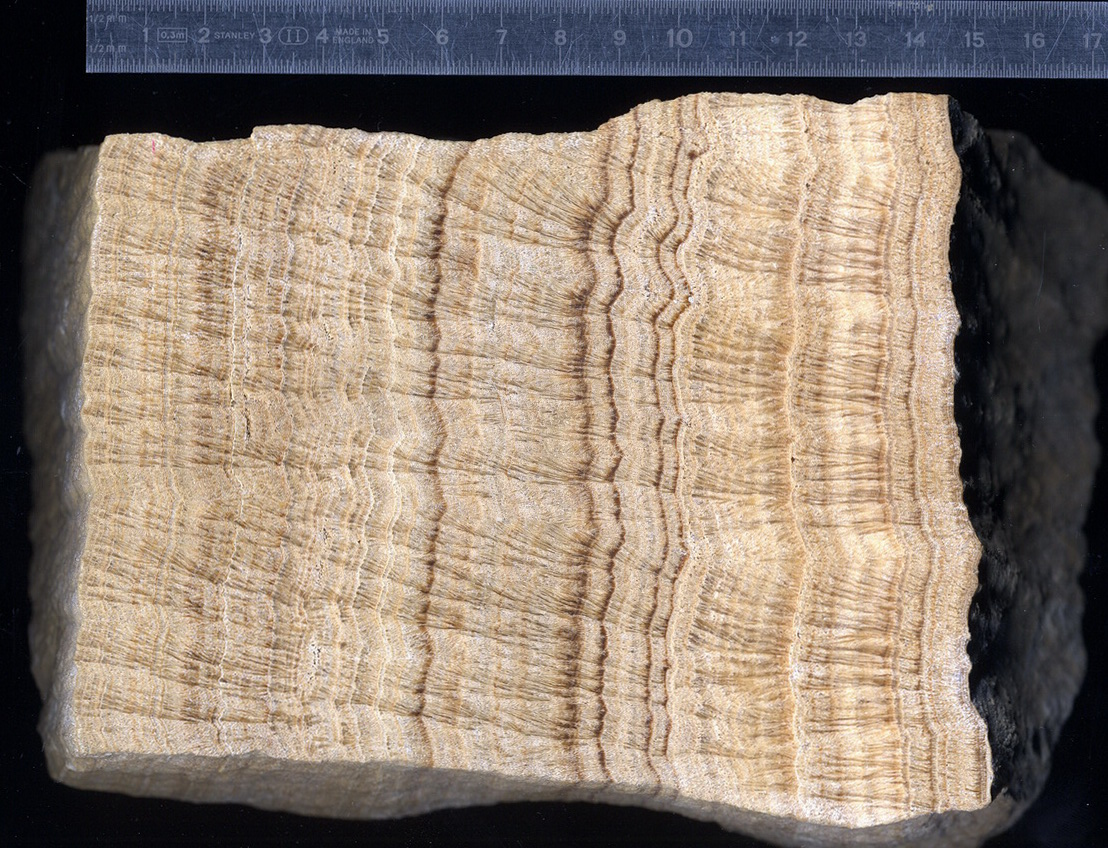
Lamination in a piece of travertine. In this case the layering was caused by seasonal differences in sediment supply. This rock was part of the Roman aqueduct of Mons/Montauroux–Fréjus and was most probably derived from the karst area in the vicinity.

In geology, lamination (from Latin lāmina 'thin layer') is a small-scale sequence of fine layers (pl.: laminae; sg.: lamina) that occurs in sedimentary rocks. Laminae are normally smaller and less pronounced than bedding. Lamination is often regarded as planar structures one centimetre or less in thickness, whereas bedding layers are greater than one centimetre. However, structures from several millimetres to many centimetres have been described as laminae. A single sedimentary rock can have both laminae and beds.

== Description ==
Lamination consists of small differences in the type of sediment that occur throughout the rock. They are caused by cyclic changes in the supply of sediment. These changes can occur in grain size, clay percentage, microfossil content, organic material content or mineral content and often result in pronounced differences in colour between the laminae. Weathering can make the differences even more clear.

Lamination can occur as parallel structures (parallel lamination) or in different sets that make an angle with each other (cross-lamination). It can occur in many different types of sedimentary rock, from coarse sandstone to fine shales, mudstones or in evaporites.

Because lamination is a small structure, it is easily destroyed by bioturbation (the activity of burrowing organisms) shortly after deposition. Lamination therefore survives better under anoxic circumstances, or when the sedimentation rate was high and the sediment was buried before bioturbation could occur.

== Origin ==
Lamination develops in fine grained sediment when fine grained particles settle, which can only happen in quiet water. Examples of sedimentary environments are deep marine (at the seafloor) or lacustrine (at the bottom of a lake), or mudflats, where the tide creates cyclic differences in sediment supply.

Laminae formed in glaciolacustrine environments (in glacier lakes) are a special case. They are called varves. Quaternary varves are used in stratigraphy and palaeoclimatology to reconstruct climate changes during the last few hundred thousand years.

Lamination in sandstone is often formed in a coastal environment, where wave energy causes a separation between grains of different sizes.

== See also ==
- Bed (geology)
- Foliation (geology)
- Liesegang rings (geology)
- Speleothem
- Stratum
