= Fayence =

Fayence Faiença (Occitan)
- Commune
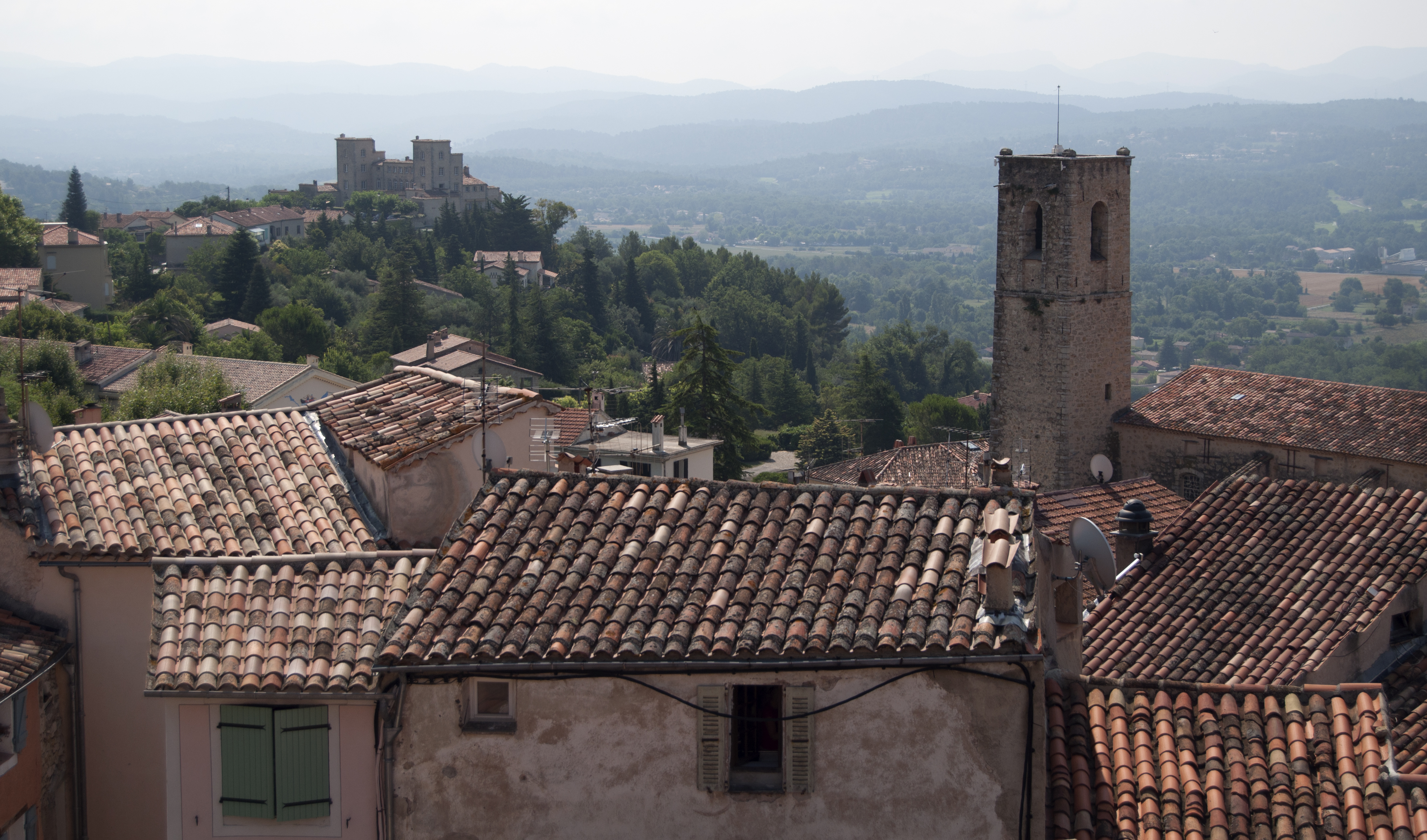
- A general view of Fayence

- Coat of arms
- Location of Fayence
- Location within France Location within Provence-Alpes-Côte d'Azur
- Coordinates: 43°37′27″N 6°41′41″E
- Country: France
- Region: Provence-Alpes-Côte d'Azur
- Department: Var
- Arrondissement: Draguignan
- Canton: Roquebrune-sur-Argens
- Intercommunality: Pays de Fayence

Government
  - Mayor (2020–2026): Bernard Henry
- Area^{1}: 27.68 km^{2} (10.69 sq mi)
- Elevation: 349 m (1,145 ft)
- Highest elevation: 665 m (2,182 ft)
- Lowest elevation: 184 m (604 ft)
- Population (2023): 6,157
  - Density: 222.4/km^{2} (576.1/sq mi)
- Time zone: UTC+01:00 (CET)
  - Summer (DST): UTC+02:00 (CEST)
- INSEE/Postal code: 83055 /83440
- ^{1} French Land Register data, which excludes lakes, ponds, glaciers > 1 km^{2} (0.386 sq mi or 247 acres) and river estuaries.

Fayence (French pronunciation: [fajɑ̃s]; Occitan: Faiença) is a commune in the Var department in the Provence-Alpes-Côte d'Azur region in Southeastern France.

Fayence is one of a series of "perched villages" overlooking the plain between the southern Alps and the Esterel massif, which borders the Mediterranean Sea between Cannes and Saint-Raphaël. The village is located on the road to Mons, which later on joins the Route Napoléon linking Nice to Grenoble through the Alps.

Some high-standing resorts have settled nearby the village in the recent years: the Domaine de Terre Blanche at Tourrettes and Domaine de Fayence attract a foreign clientele. The village contains a primary school (École de la Ferrage) and a junior high school (Collège Marie Mauron). The Aérodrome de Fayence-Tourettes is one of the most active in Europe for gliding; it hosts the Provence Côte d'Azur Aeronautical Association.

== History ==
Before and during WWII, Fayence-Tourettes Airfield was an air force base. On 13 June 1940, 12 Italian Fiat CR.42 Falcos from 151° Gruppo of 53° Stormo attacked the airfield, destroying several aircraft on the ground.

== Population ==
Historical population
Year	Pop.	±% p.a.
1968	1,768	—
1975	2,146	+2.81%
1982	2,652	+3.07%
1990	3,502	+3.54%
1999	4,253	+2.18%
2007	4,867	+1.70%
2012	5,460	+2.33%
2017	5,792	+1.19%
2023	6,157	+1.02%
Source: INSEE

== Notable people ==
Gustave Malécot (28 December 1911 – 1998), mathematician

== See also ==
- Communes of the Var department
