= Dupont de Ligonnès murders and disappearance =

Unsolved homicide case in France

Xavier Dupont de Ligonnès
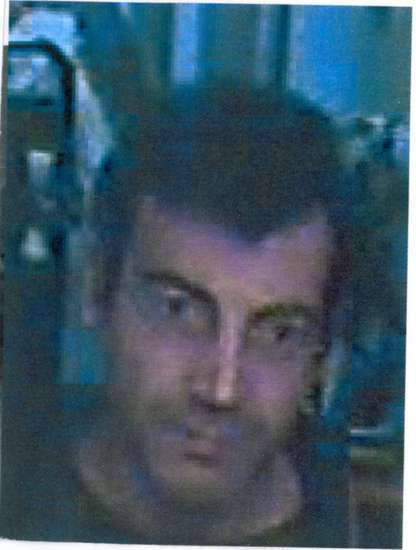
- One of the last images of Xavier Dupont de Ligonnès, at the Formule 1 hotel in Roquebrune-sur-Argens
- Born: Xavier Pierre Marie Dupont de Ligonnès; 9 January 1961; Versailles, Yvelines, France
- Disappeared: 15 April 2011 (aged 50); Roquebrune-sur-Argens, Var, France
- Status: Missing
- Occupation: Businessman

The Dupont de Ligonnès murders and disappearance also known as the "Nantes massacre" (French: tuerie de Nantes) involved the murder of five members of the same family in Nantes, Loire-Atlantique, France, followed by the disappearance of the patriarch of the family, Xavier Dupont de Ligonnès. His wife, Agnès Dupont de Ligonnès, and their four children, Arthur, Thomas, Anne, and Benoît, along with the family's two dogs, were killed on an undetermined day in early April 2011. Their bodies were found buried in their garden on April 21. Xavier disappeared at the same time and has not been found. The exact nature of the events has never been determined, but Xavier is considered the prime suspect in the murders. Since the investigation began, he is targeted by an unpublished blue notice (witness) of Interpol.

== Background ==
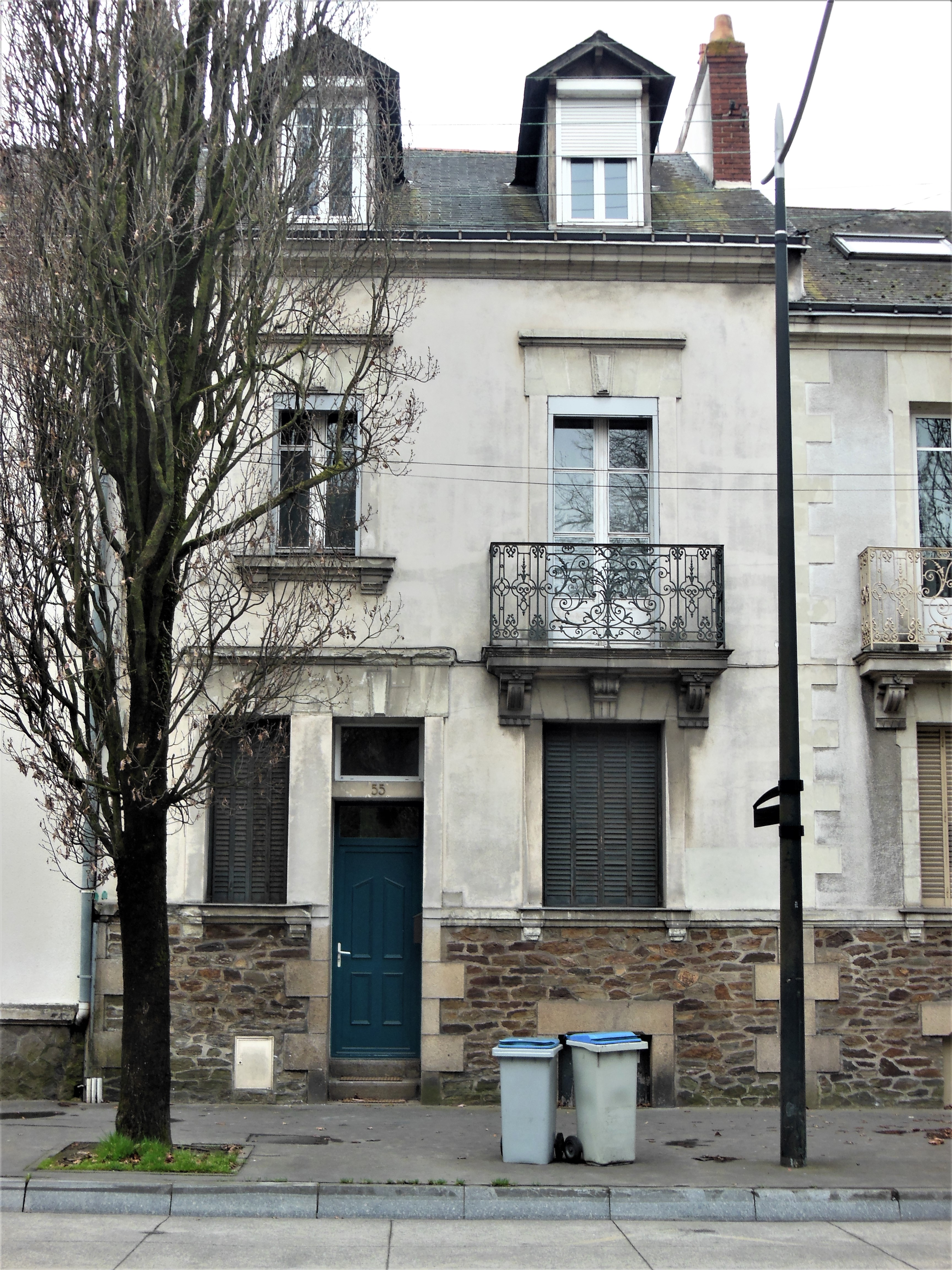
Facade of the family home, at 55 Boulevard Robert-Schuman in Nantes

The Dupont de Ligonnès family was an aristocratic family originally from Annonay, in the Vivarais region in south-eastern France. Ancestors include Édouard du Pont de Ligonnès (1797–1877), who married Sophie de Lamartine, sister of the poet Alphonse de Lamartine, and whose youngest son, Charles du Pont de Ligonnès, became the Bishop of Rodez.

Xavier Pierre Marie Dupont de Ligonnès (born 9 January 1961 in Versailles) is the son of Bernard-Hubert Dupont de Ligonnès (7 November 1931 – 20 January 2011), an engineer with a degree from the École nationale supérieure de mécanique et d'aérotechnique in Poitiers; his mother was Geneviève Thérèse Maître. Xavier's professional activities were very vague, but he is described as a salesman by a source close to the inquiry. Xavier created several businesses with limited success, most of which catered to travelling salespeople and restaurant guests. One business based in Pornic, called SELREF, had a secretive and ambiguously defined purpose. The company's 2006 accounts, accessible through a public commercial website, only show the bare minimum information, and the last data pertaining to the company was filed with the French Register of Commerce on 24 February 2004. As manager of SELREF, Xavier hired six salespeople in 2003 and released them all shortly afterwards.

Xavier's wife, Agnès Hodanger, was born on 9 November 1962 in Neuilly-sur-Seine, a suburb of Paris. She was an assistant at Blanche-de-Castille Catholic School in Nantes, where part of her duties involved teaching catechism. Agnès was described as being very religious, regularly attending Mass with her children. Parishioners described her as being kind but strict with the children. In 2004, writing on the French online medical chat forum Doctissimo, Agnès described the difficulties she and her husband were having and stated he had commented to her that a group death as a family would not be a catastrophe.

At the time of the murders, Xavier and Agnès lived at 55 Boulevard Robert Schuman in Nantes, Loire-Atlantique, in a modest house in the western suburbs of the city.

=== Children ===
==== Arthur Dupont de Ligonnès ====
Arthur Nicolas Dupont de Ligonnès was born on 7 July 1990 to another father, but was recognised by Xavier as his son when he married Agnès when Arthur was two years old. He earned a baccalauréat in Science, Industrial Technology and Sustainable Development at the age of 20. He was studying for a technical diploma in IT at the Saint-Gabriel private college in Saint-Laurent-sur-Sèvre in the Vendée department, an hour's drive from Nantes. He was also employed as a waiter at a pizzeria in Nantes. He was 20 years old at the time of his death.

==== Thomas ====
Thomas Dupont de Ligonnès was born on 28 August 1992 in Draguignan, in the south of France. He earned a baccalauréat in Literature when he was 17. He was passionate about music and studied it at the Catholic University of the West in Angers. He lived in the Saint-Aubin hall of residence and was described as an "ordinary boy who was often accompanied by his family to drop him off and pick him up", while several of his classmates remember him as "very discreet". He was 18 years old at the time of his death.

==== Anne ====
Anne Dupont de Ligonnès was born on 2 August 1994 in Draguignan. She was in the 11th grade following an academic curriculum in Science, and was described by her friends and relatives as a girl who shared her mother's religious beliefs and was considerate and approachable. Her friends became concerned when she was regularly offline and did not answer calls. Anne was 16 years old at the time of her death.

==== Benoît ====
Benoît Dupont de Ligonnès was born on 29 May 1997, Xavier and Agnès's youngest child. He was an altar server at Saint-Félix Church in Nantes. He was 13 years old at the time of his death.

== Timeline ==
=== Family's final actions ===
- The lease on the house had been terminated.
- All bank accounts had been closed.
- The children's school received a final payment settlement.
- Xavier phoned Agnès's employer to inform them she was suffering from gastroenteritis. Two days later, the employer received a text saying Agnès had been hospitalised and couldn't be contacted by phone. The following week, the employer received a letter from Agnès terminating her employment and explaining she was following her husband to Australia.
- A message was placed on their letter box: "Return all mail to sender. Thank you."
- The house had been partially emptied.
- Xavier had bought cement, a shovel and a hoe.

==== March 2011 ====
- Xavier purchased rifle bullets on 12 March.
- Xavier registered at the Charles Des Jamonières shooting range to the north of Nantes, which he visited four times between 26 March and 1 April. He obtained his firearms licence on 2 February 2011. Thomas and Benoît had also started to learn how to shoot, while Arthur was scheduled to start.
- A sales receipt from a DIY store was found at the family home. The store is located in Saint-Maur in the central French department of Indre, approximately 320 kilometres (200 miles) from Nantes, a 3.5-hour drive away. The receipt was dated to a Wednesday in late March – either the 23rd or the 30th – and listed several purchases, including a roll of large bin liners and a box of adhesive plastic paving slabs.

==== April 2011 ====
===== Friday 1 April =====
- Arthur, the oldest child, leaves the college where he was studying and does not turn up at the pizzeria where he worked and was due to go to pick up his monthly wages. His boss is surprised by this, stating that Arthur always came to collect his wages on the first day of the month.

===== Saturday 2 April =====
- Xavier buys four bags of lime, 10 kg each, from different shops in the Nantes area.

===== Sunday 3 April =====
- A neighbour, Fabrice, sees Agnès for the last time. Shortly afterwards, he sees Xavier "putting large bags into his car", a Citroën C5.
- The couple and three of the children dine in a restaurant in Nantes, then go to the cinema.
- At 10.37 pm, Xavier leaves a message on his sister Christine's voicemail: "We spent our Sunday evening in the cinema together, then in a restaurant, and we've just got back – I'm just calling to ask if it's too late to speak to you on the phone and now I see it's gone to voicemail. But ... I was surprised, you spoke to me about Bertram, who's getting ready for his flight?! Huh?! But ... I thought he'd only just arrived! ... So I was a bit surprised. Anyway, sending you my love ... If it's not too late, call me back or send me a text and I'll call you. OK, I'm going to put the kids to bed, say hi to everyone. See you soon! ... Maybe ...". The recording of the actual message was released publicly in September 2019.

===== Monday 4 April =====
- Anne and Benoît do not turn up at their school, La Perverie-Sacré-Cœur, "due to illness". Anne and Benoît's friends become concerned when they are unable to reach them. They remember a rumour about the family leaving for Australia where their father had been given a job transfer, and they find it suspicious that their friends hadn't told them about this "departure". They attempt to contact Benoît and Anne online and by text.
- Xavier speaks with his sister, Christine de Ligonnès, on the telephone for 20 to 30 minutes. She said that everything seemed normal.
- Xavier dines with his son Thomas at La Croix Cadeau, a high-end restaurant in Avrillé, near Angers. The pair arrived at about 9 pm. Xavier ordered a €35 tasting menu with half a bottle of Anjou-villages-brissac red wine; Thomas had a sea bass dish and a tomato juice. The total bill for the meal came to €72.55. The two waiters remember Thomas feeling unwell near the end of the meal, and that Xavier and Thomas barely spoke to each other during the meal.

Investigators believe that Xavier Dupont de Ligonnès murdered his wife and three of his children on the night of 3 to 4 April, then murdered his son Thomas on the evening of 5 April.

===== Tuesday 5 April =====
- A bailiff comes to the family home to recover a debt of €20,000, but no one answers the door.
- The family's neighbours dispute Agnès's stated date of death. They have claimed that she was seen in front of her house on 5 April around 12.15 or 12.30 pm, and again on 7 April. The prosecutor in Nantes acknowledged that forensic experts were unable to narrow the exact date of death down to a specific day. In addition, an employee of a hairdressing salon near the house claimed on RTL to have seen Agnès on Tuesday 5 April. The employee stated, "I came to pick up my wages. It was a Tuesday, it was 5 April. I needed my wages. I saw her on the pavement on her phone around 12.15 or 12.30."
- A friend of Thomas', who studied music with him, confirmed that Thomas spent Tuesday afternoon with him at the friend's home in Angers, where they played music and watched television. Thomas had planned to spend the night at his friend's house, but Xavier phoned his son, asking him to return to Nantes, as his mother had been involved in a "cycling accident". Thomas ate quickly with his friend, then took a train home at around 10 pm. The following day, the friend tried to reach Thomas, but only received brief text messages in reply, such as "I'm not coming to yours. I'm ill" and "Really ill, I'm not coming to class". Two days after Thomas's departure, his friend received a text: "I'm out of battery, my dad's looking for a new charger for me." This is the last that Thomas's friend heard from him or anyone else in the family. Pauline, Thomas's ex-girlfriend and classmate, remembers him as a "light-hearted, cheerful and happy guy". She stated that they didn't date for long and described her ex-boyfriend as "a really nice guy who always listened to what you had to say ... very close to his brothers, sister, mother and father ... passionate about music and cinema." She also stated that she had spoken to him on Facebook on Tuesday 5 April while he was at his friend's house, and that he had seemed "odd in his way of writing" when he told her his father told him his mother had been in a cycling accident and that Thomas had to return home that same evening. Furthermore, the day before (Monday 4 April), she had noticed that he seemed "lonely" and had told her that he "would skip classes on Wednesday to come to a music rehearsal," but he did not turn up at the rehearsal, which was "not like him".
- During this week, neighbours heard the family dogs howling for two consecutive nights and then never heard them again.

===== Wednesday 6 April =====
- Arthur's girlfriend, who is concerned after not having heard from him, knocks on the door of the family home, where "a light was on on the first floor", but the family's two Labrador Retrievers do not bark when she knocks.

===== Thursday 7 April: several witnesses claim to have seen Agnès alive =====
- Xavier is seen making several return trips from the house to his car, loading the car with large bags. A neighbour also claims to have spoken to Agnès on this day: "On 7 April, I saw Agnès walking her dog. We spoke briefly, then I cut our chat short because I had an important appointment."
- This same neighbour spoke to RTL on condition of anonymity, saying "the newspapers say the autopsies put her death on the 4th [April], but I'm almost convinced I saw her on the evening of Thursday the 7th because I know I didn't have much time to speak to her as I pick up my son from the childminder every Thursday evening."
- A report by Anne-Sophie Martin on the programme Envoyé spécial ("Special Correspondent"), which was broadcast on the channel France 2 on 24 October 2013, stated that more than two years after the events, this neighbour was still convinced that she saw Agnès on the 7th. The report revealed another witness who agreed with this: a saleswoman friend of Agnès who stated that she saw her in her shop on either Thursday 7 or Friday 8 April.

===== Friday 8 April =====
- Xavier writes on the Catholic online forum cite-catholique.org. According to the state prosecutor, he "went online for the last time on 8 April from the IP address of the family home in Nantes."
- He sends an email to his brother-in-law (Christine's husband), saying "everything's fine, Bertram, you'll hear more detailed news soon through Christine. Bye for now. All the best, Xavier."
- A message to Xavier's mother and sister is sent from the family home's IP address. After this was revealed by RTL and Le Figaro on 5 May, the family's lawyer, Stéphane Goldenstein, said "it was sent from their IP address, but what if it was written under duress? Either Xavier killed himself or he was murdered..."

=== Disappearance and letters ===
==== Monday 11 April ====
- Anne and Benoît's school receives a letter signed by Xavier, stating that Anne and Benoît will be leaving the school and the family will be moving to the United States due to "urgent professional changes". The Catholic school where Agnès works receives a resignation letter signed by Agnès, stating the same reason for leaving. The headmaster is unable to reach her by telephone.
- A typed, unsigned letter dated 11 April (the date may have been added afterwards) is sent to Xavier's immediate family. This was revealed by the press on 5 May. In this letter, Xavier explains that after having worked covertly for the American Drug Enforcement Administration (DEA), the entire family has had to relocate to the United States as part of a Federal Witness Protection Program, and that no one will be able to contact them for a few years. He advises his relatives to circulate reports on social media that the family has in fact moved to Australia. There is no proof that this letter was written by Xavier Dupont de Ligonnès.
- Xavier spends the night of 11 to 12 April at the Hôtel Première Classe in Blagnac, near Toulouse, in southern France, and pays for his stay by credit card. He then leaves in his Citroën C5.

==== Tuesday 12 April ====
- Xavier spends the night of 12 to 13 April at the Auberge de Cassagne in Le Pontet in Vaucluse, in south-eastern France, under the false name of Mr Laurent Xavier. He pays €214.59 by credit card.

==== Wednesday 13 April ====
- Neighbours in Nantes become concerned and contact the police. The house's shutters have been closed for more than a week and Agnès's car has been parked outside on the street the entire time.
- Xavier spends the night of 13 to 14 April at a hotel in La Seyne-sur-Mer in Var, south-eastern France. He had lived in the town in the 1980s. A former girlfriend from that time informed the police that Xavier had contacted her that evening, although they did not meet.

==== Thursday 14 April ====
- Xavier withdraws €30 from an ATM in Roquebrune-sur-Argens in Var.
- That evening, Xavier sleeps at the Hotel Formule 1 in the town, where he is captured on film by a surveillance camera – the last known sighting of him.

==== Friday 15 April ====
- Xavier checks out of the hotel, abandoning his car there.

=== Investigation and discovery of bodies ===
==== Tuesday 19 April ====
- An investigation was opened and revealed Xavier's purchase of the DIY materials.

==== Thursday 21 April ====
- A "witness" notice is issued for the whole family. During the day, investigators discover the remains of Agnès and the four children under the patio in the back garden of the house. The family's two Labrador dogs had also been killed and buried.
- During the night of 21 to 22 April, the metallic-blue Citroën C5 with registration 235 CJG 44 is found in the car park of the Formula 1 Hotel in Roquebrune-sur-Argens by police equipped with an automatic number plate recognition system. The whereabouts of a Pontiac, which was also being sought, remain unknown to this day.
- Investigators turn towards a line of inquiry involving a monastery. It is speculated that Xavier Dupont de Ligonnès could have withdrawn to a monastery, where he would be afforded discretion.

=== Autopsies, funeral and cremation ===
==== 22 April: autopsies ====
- According to the autopsies, the victims were drugged and then shot dead with a .22 Long Rifle as they slept. Xavier has a weapon of this calibre, which he inherited from his father three months before the murders.
- The prosecutor in Nantes states that he will allow the victims to be buried in the next few days. The surprising speed of this procedure, combined with the fact that relatives were advised not to view the bodies, leads Xavier's relatives to believe that the bodies recovered are not those of Agnès and her children.
- An undisclosed blue-notice (witness) is issued by Interpol to locate Xavier Dupont de Ligonnès, in order to obtain witness testimony from him with regard to the murders.

==== 28 April: funeral ====
- The family's funeral was held at 2.30 pm at Saint-Félix Church in Nantes. The Dupont de Ligonnès family regularly attended this church, and Benoît was an altar server there. 1,400 people attended the funeral. The family requested a simple ceremony with neither flowers nor wreaths. Significant security was provided for the event. The bodies were cremated after the funeral. The victims were buried on Saturday 30 April at 10.30 am in Noyers-sur-Serein in the Yonne department in east-central France, the place of origin of Agnès's family.

=== Hunt for Xavier Dupont de Ligonnès ===
On 29 April, a search was carried out in the Var department. On 10 May, an undisclosed blue notice (witness) was issued by Interpol for Xavier Dupont de Ligonnès.

On 23 June, caving experts searched 40 natural caves in a 15-kilometre (10-mile) radius around Roquebrune-sur-Argens.

=== Media coverage and "cyber-investigation" ===
Following the disappearance of Xavier Dupont de Ligonnès, and based on elements of the police investigation reported by the media, "hundreds of French Internet users, fascinated by this curious crime, became improvised cyber-investigators and gained great excitement from recreating every digital trace left by Agnès and Xavier" on Facebook.

According to an AFP press release in Le Monde, "administrators of a Catholic website, classified as fundamentalist by the episcopacy, confirmed that Xavier Dupont de Ligonnès was a member of their forum, where in 2010 he asked about the meaning of "sacrifice" and he recently became "aggressive". Xavier was involved in various theological discussions under several different online identities on the Christian forum La Cité catholique. He was eventually banned from the forum. According to a source close to Dupont de Ligonnès, he "never set foot inside a church". A study published by Bernard Blandre in Mouvements Religieux ("Religious Movements") and later put online states that if Xavier is the murderer, his motives were not religious.

== Lines of inquiry ==
The investigation has been running since 2011 and has led to more than 800 tips, as well as searches that have led to dead ends.

=== Friends ===
- Before his disappearance, Xavier Dupont de Ligonnès attempted to make contact with several old friends. The police in Nantes, under the orders of Judge Robert Tchalian, spent more than two years looking for Claudia, a German woman whom Xavier almost married in the early 1980s, and with whom he had kept in contact.
- On 27 February 2013, German police had planned to launch an appeal for witnesses on the German programme Aktenzeichen XY… ungelöst ("Case Number XY Unsolved") on the German public channel ZDF. This appeal was abandoned when Xavier's sister and brother-in-law noticed that the file included their email addresses, contrary to Germany's very strict privacy laws. According to French prosecutor Brigitte Lamy, information from Germany was handed to French investigators on 16 April 2013 but "added nothing to the file".

=== American investigation ===
Xavier Dupont de Ligonnès created Netsurf Concept LLC, a company that was recorded on the commercial register in Florida, United States. His advisor was Gérard Corona, a French immigrant and manager of the company Strategy Netcom, which was founded in 1998. Corona specialises in assisting foreigners with administrative and legal procedures in the United States. He also helps his clients to open foreign bank accounts and to obtain anonymous bank cards allowing them to withdraw money anywhere in the world without leaving a trace. It has been theorised that Xavier Dupont de Ligonnès could have used these services in order to disappear.

==== Texas 2020 ====
There was a possible sighting of Dupont de Ligonnès in Brewster County, Texas in 2020 with a black Labrador Retriever. In March 2026 the sheriff's office posted 15-year-old photos of him and appealed to the public for information.

=== Searches in the Massif des Maures ===
- On 9 April 2013, an operation was conducted to find the body of Xavier Dupont de Ligonnès. This led to a major search effort. Investigators, assisted by cave divers, searched the old Pic Martin lead mines in Cannet-des-Maures in Var. It was here that Jacques Massié and his family were found murdered in 1981.
- On 2 May 2013, a search was carried out by 50 police officers and firefighters from a unit specialising in searching in dangerous and hard-to-access locations. The search proved fruitless.

=== Investigators' conclusions ===
Prosecutor Brigitte Lamy has not reconsidered Xavier Dupont de Ligonnès's status as a suspect and leans towards the belief that he committed suicide. If his body is found and there is no other suspect, the investigation will be closed "by default".

In June 2013, a body was found 20 kilometres (12 miles) from where Xavier Dupont de Ligonnès was last seen. An autopsy was carried out and did not completely exclude the possibility of the body being that of Xavier. The prosecutor in Draguignan, Danielle Drouy-Ayral, stated "at this moment in time, it is not the body of Xavier Dupont de Ligonnès", without providing any more details to explain this declaration.

=== Bones discovered ===
On the evening of Tuesday 28 April 2015, a walker discovered bones in a forest in Bagnols-en-Forêt, near Fréjus on the south coast of France, close to where Xavier Dupont de Ligonnès was last seen.

The police made a link with Xavier's disappearance and analysed what appeared to be a survival camp where other objects were discovered, including an empty wallet, a lighter, a pair of glasses, a sleeping bag, a magazine and a bill dating from 2011. A medical pin was also allegedly found in the unknown decedent's forearm bone. However, as far as the police are aware, Xavier Dupont de Ligonnès did not have a medical device in his forearm, even though it is not impossible that he may have been operated on after his disappearance. The magazine that was found seems to date from 2010, preceding Xavier's disappearance in 2011.

On 1 May 2015, the RTL.fr website reported that "DNA obtained from the personal effects around the body discovered on the evening of 28 April in Bagnols-en-Forêt is not that of Xavier Dupont de Ligonnès, but that of another man whose identity is currently unknown."

=== Note to journalist ===
In mid-July 2015, a Nantes journalist received a photograph, on the back of which is a handwritten note "I'm still alive". The picture shows two of the Dupont de Ligonnès children – Arthur, the oldest and Benoît, the youngest – sitting at a kitchen table. It is not known who took and who sent the picture.

=== Monastery raided ===
On 9 January 2018, police raided the Saint-Desert monastery in Roquebrune-sur-Argens, the village where Xavier Dupont de Ligonnès was last seen, after several worshippers claimed that they had seen him there. Police initially struggled to make headway as the monks at the monastery have taken a vow of silence. However, after a two-and-a-half-hour search, they determined that the reports were a case of mistaken identity, and the person believed to be Dupont de Ligonnès was a monk who bore a resemblance to him.

=== Glasgow Airport arrest ===
On 11 October 2019, a man was arrested at Glasgow Airport in Scotland after arriving on a flight from Paris Charles de Gaulle Airport. Following an advance passenger information (API) alert, Interpol in London had informed the French authorities on Friday 11 October that a passenger who was booked onto a Paris-Glasgow flight on Saturday 12 October had entered API details corresponding to a stolen French passport. Suspecting that the passport may have been used by Xavier Dupont de Ligonnès, the French authorities planned to be present at the boarding gate at Charles de Gaulle Airport for the Saturday flight to intercept the passenger and verify his identity. However, the passenger made a last-minute change to his flight booking, instead flying to Glasgow on the Friday evening. This was too late for the French authorities to go to the airport in Paris, so they asked their Scottish counterparts to intercept the passenger upon arrival in Glasgow. The passenger was duly arrested by Police Scotland, who fingerprinted him before telling the French authorities: "This is your man." This information was released to the media and the story received blanket news coverage in France. However, in the meantime, the French authorities had studied CCTV images from Charles de Gaulle Airport and doubted that the man was Dupont de Ligonnès; their doubts were further raised when Police Scotland refused to send them the fingerprinting results.

On 12 October, following more thorough fingerprinting and a DNA test, it was announced that the arrested man was not Xavier Dupont de Ligonnès, but a 69-year-old Portuguese-born French national visiting his Scottish wife in Dunoon. The man was released without charge. It was revealed that the man had reported his passport stolen in 2014, but had since acquired a valid, legitimate replacement passport and has been travelling on that passport regularly since then.

Following this revelation, critics in France raised concerns about how the media took the official police statements for granted.

=== Challenges to the official theory ===
==== Emigration theory ====
Even though Christine de Ligonnès initially doubted the authenticity of the letter of 11 April 2011 (while still claiming her brother's innocence), she began stating to the media in March 2012 that "basically, Xavier and his family left for the United States because their safety was threatened in France. The bodies found under the patio can't be those of Agnès and the children." She believes that "the information leaked to the media originates from sources with an interest in making the family disappear". In 2013, in the blog that she created with her husband, Bertram de Verdun, she mentions an email that her brother wrote to two friends in July 2010. He wrote of "accidents" which may befall his family, and ended with the words: "So it is my wish that, even after a police investigation, my parents, brothers and sisters are never led to believe that I intentionally caused these accidents (even if the evidence is strong)."

==== Family's and their lawyer's views on the investigation ====
According to Mr Goldenstein (the lawyer for Geneviève Dupont de Ligonnès, the suspect's mother; Christine, his sister; and Bertram de Verdun, Christine's husband):

"We don't even know when the victims were killed. The autopsy points to death between 10 and 21 days before their discovery. Such imprecision is truly astonishing. [...] In reality, nothing is certain in this affair, other than the fact that some bodies were found at 55 Boulevard Robert Schuman. [...] Investigations were carried out, but all that they have allowed us to ascertain is that the bodies share the same DNA. No analysis has compared this common DNA with that of Agnès Hodanger. Furthermore, my client confirms that the bodies' heights and weights do not correspond to the known dimensions of the family members. In my opinion, this constitutes negligence during the autopsy. But the autopsy allows Christine and Geneviève to step into the breach. [...] What I also know is that one man alone cannot dig that hole under the patio, even a man blinded by rage and hatred: 2.5 cubic metres (3.25 cubic yards) of earth was displaced. The affair is based on the idea that Xavier Dupont killed his family before burying them. No other line of inquiry has been explored. I don't know who killed this family. Nothing about their lives would lead me to believe that anyone would have it in for them to this extent. That is the conclusion of my clients. Since no one could have killed them, the fact is that they are not dead."

Christine de Verdun also cites on her blog the difficulties faced by a person burying five people underneath the garden patio. She provides photographs of the niche where the bodies were discovered and states that the space is 1.2 metres (just under 4 feet) high. Thus, the perpetrator would have had to be working on their hands and knees, without long tools (including the shovel and hoe purchased by Xavier just before the murders). Christine also mentions that no displaced earth was found in the garden, in which case the perpetrator would have had to have used a tarpaulin, displaced 5 tons of earth by hand, and left absolutely no trace of this earth. Furthermore, Christine claims that Xavier had neck and back problems and would not have been physically capable of such a task. Finally, it is surmised that due to the low headroom, the perpetrator would likely have both banged their head and rubbed their hair on the ceiling repeatedly, but no human skin cells, blood, or DNA were found there.

==== Potential sightings ====
Police received more than 900 reports from people who believed they had spotted Xavier. Most notably, in 2016, someone matching his physical description was caught on CCTV in a casino in Néris-les-Bains, and the police subsequently concentrated their search on the area.

== Televised documentaries and dramas ==
At least five documentaries and special reports exploring the case have been aired on French television.

French broadcaster TF1 produced a drama series inspired by the events. While the storyline is fictional, it is based on the Dupont de Ligonnès case, as well as that of John List. The plot revolves around a man, Thomas Kertez (played by Kad Merad), his wife Alice (Laurence Arné) and their eight-year-old son Romain (Gaspard Pasquet), an ordinary family whose lives are turned upside down when the police suspect that Thomas is living under a false identity and is actually Antoine Durieux-Jelosse, a man suspected of murdering his family 15 years earlier before going on the run and not being seen since. Thomas is brought under investigation by the police and goes about trying to prove his innocence, both to the police and his family. Filming for the series, consisting of two 45-minute episodes, took place in December 2018, and the series was aired in September 2019.

In 2020, Netflix resurrected the Unsolved Mysteries series and the Dupont de Ligonnès murders were investigated in the third episode, "House of Terror".

== See also ==
- List of fugitives from justice who disappeared
- List of people who disappeared mysteriously (2000–present)
- List of unsolved deaths
- Capital punishment in France
- Familicide

=== Similar cases ===
- John Bingham, 7th Earl of Lucan
- Bradford Bishop
- Crawford family murder
- Robert William Fisher
- Jean-Claude Romand
- John List (murderer)
- Watts family murders
