= Tanneron =

Tanneron Tanaron (Occitan)
- Commune
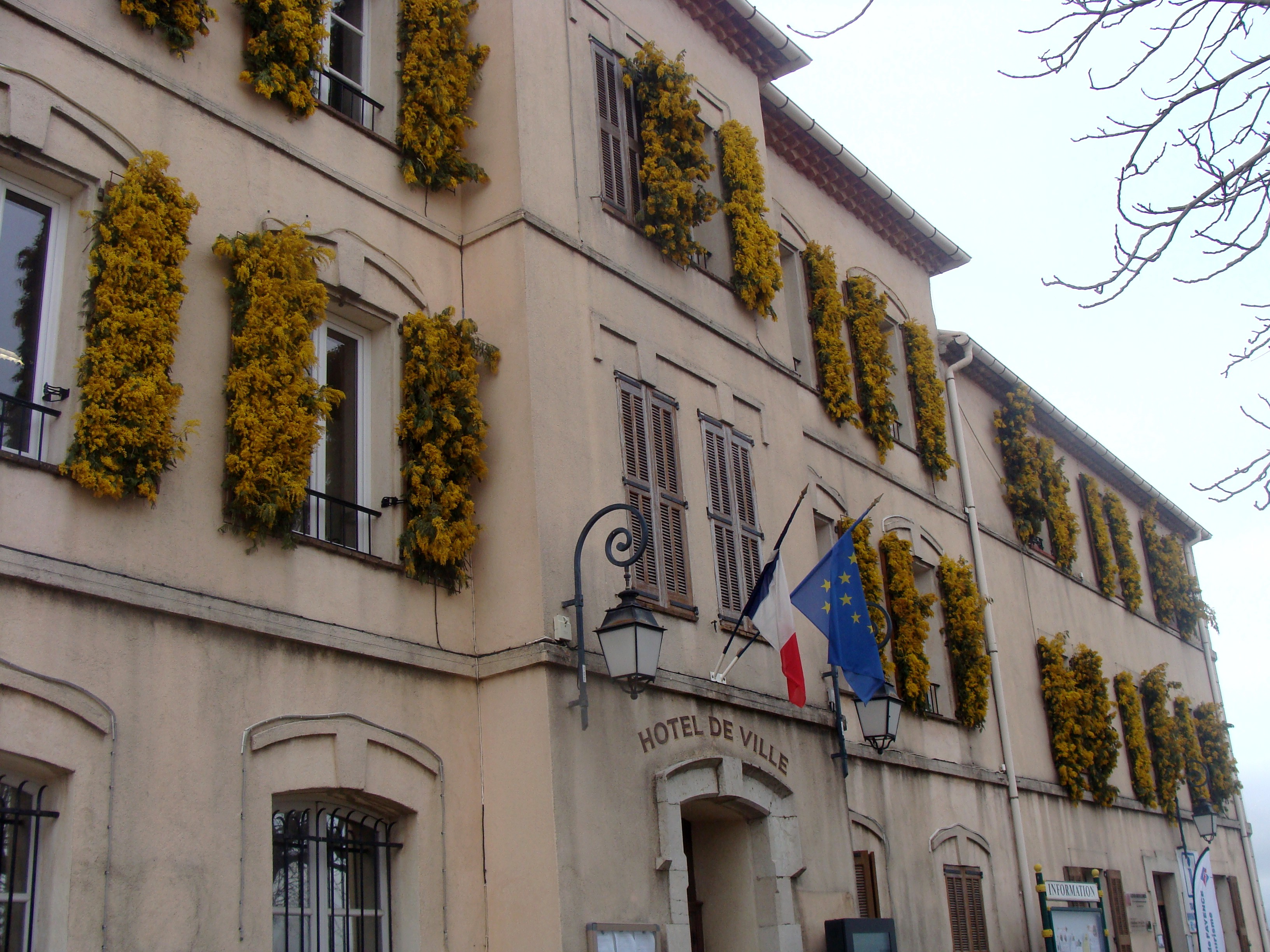
- Town hall

- Coat of arms
- Location of Tanneron
- Location within France Location within Provence-Alpes-Côte d'Azur
- Coordinates: 43°35′29″N 6°52′34″E
- Country: France
- Region: Provence-Alpes-Côte d'Azur
- Department: Var
- Arrondissement: Draguignan
- Canton: Roquebrune-sur-Argens
- Intercommunality: Pays de Fayence

Government
  - Mayor (2025–2026): Julien Augier
- Area^{1}: 52.78 km^{2} (20.38 sq mi)
- Elevation: 380 m (1,250 ft)
- Highest elevation: 516 m (1,693 ft)
- Lowest elevation: 11 m (36 ft)
- Population (2023): 1,750
  - Density: 33.2/km^{2} (85.9/sq mi)
- Time zone: UTC+01:00 (CET)
  - Summer (DST): UTC+02:00 (CEST)
- INSEE/Postal code: 83133 /83440
- Website: www.communedetanneron.fr
- ^{1} French Land Register data, which excludes lakes, ponds, glaciers > 1 km^{2} (0.386 sq mi or 247 acres) and river estuaries.

Tanneron (French pronunciation: [tanʁɔ̃]; Occitan: Tanaron) is a commune in the Var department in the Provence-Alpes-Côte d'Azur region in Southeastern France. It borders Alpes-Maritimes to the north and east, as well as the Lac de Saint-Cassien to the west.

== See also ==
- Communes of the Var department
