= Roquebrune-sur-Argens =

Roquebrune-sur-Argens Ròcabruna d'Argenç (Occitan)
- Commune
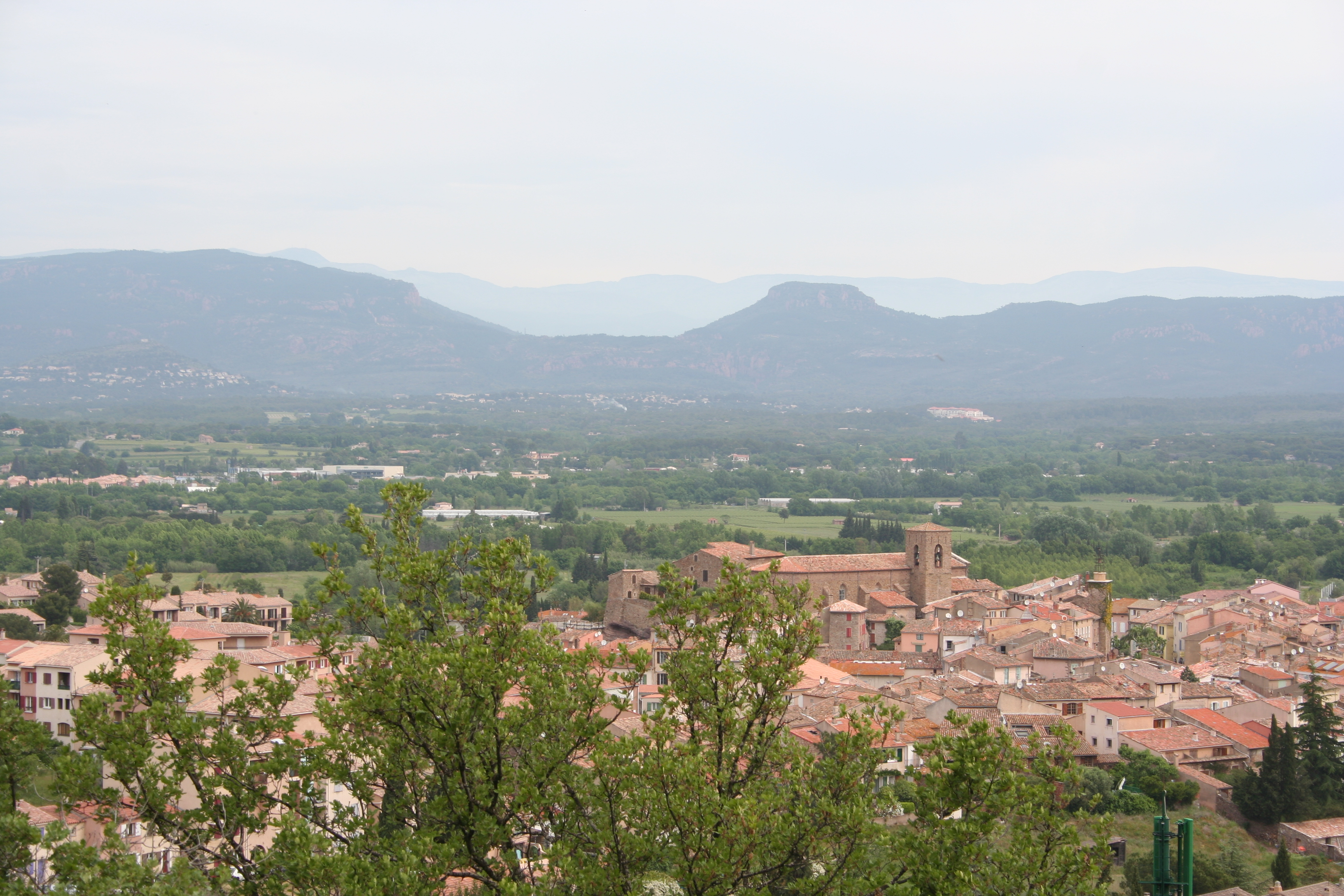
- A view of Roquebrune-sur-Argens, from the southwest

- Coat of arms
- Location of Roquebrune-sur-Argens
- Location within France Location within Provence-Alpes-Côte d'Azur
- Coordinates: 43°26′N 6°38′E
- Country: France
- Region: Provence-Alpes-Côte d'Azur
- Department: Var
- Arrondissement: Draguignan
- Canton: Roquebrune-sur-Argens
- Intercommunality: Estérel Côte d'Azur Agglomération

Government
  - Mayor (2020–2026): Jean Cayron (DVC)
- Area^{1}: 106.10 km^{2} (40.97 sq mi)
- Elevation: 13 m (43 ft)
- Highest elevation: 373 m (1,224 ft)
- Lowest elevation: 1 m (3.3 ft)
- Population (2023): 15,442
  - Density: 145.54/km^{2} (376.95/sq mi)
- Time zone: UTC+01:00 (CET)
  - Summer (DST): UTC+02:00 (CEST)
- INSEE/Postal code: 83107 /83520
- ^{1} French Land Register data, which excludes lakes, ponds, glaciers > 1 km^{2} (0.386 sq mi or 247 acres) and river estuaries.

Roquebrune-sur-Argens (French pronunciation: [ʁɔkbʁyn syʁ aʁʒɑ̃(s)]; Occitan: Ròcabruna d'Argenç) is a commune in the Var department in the Provence-Alpes-Côte d'Azur region, Southeastern France.

It lies between the cities of Draguignan to the northwest and Fréjus to the east. The commune consists of the town of Roquebrune-sur-Argens, as well as two smaller villages: La Bouverie north of town and Les Issambres to the south, on the Mediterranean coast. The commune is home to the French National Water Ski Training Site on the Lac du Vaudois, north of Les Issambres.

== History ==
The recorded history of the oldest part of the town of Roquebrune-sur-Argens began around 983. Signs of human settlements, from the local "Bouverian culture", dating from Prehistory, were found in caves near La Bouverie.

== Demographics ==
Historical population
Year	Pop.	±% p.a.
1968	3,698	—
1975	5,041	+4.53%
1982	6,301	+3.24%
1990	10,389	+6.45%
1999	11,349	+0.99%
2007	11,451	+0.11%
2012	12,155	+1.20%
2017	14,251	+3.23%
2023	15,442	+1.35%
Source: INSEE

== Economy ==
- Tourism
- Vineyards and horticulture
- Harbour (with a maritime link to Saint-Tropez harbour)
- Two industrial areas
- National Water Skiing Centre

== Sites ==
- The 1,000-old village, with many chapels
- A 2,000-year-old fishpond
- Local museum of history
- Le Blavet gorge

== Notable people ==
- Xavier Dupont de Ligonnès, suspected murderer of a family in Nantes, disappeared in Roquebrune-sur-Argens.
