= Pays de Fayence =

Federation of municipalities in France

- Communauté de communes
- Interactive map of Pays de Fayence
- Coordinates: 43°37′N 06°43′E
- Country: France
- Region: Provence-Alpes-Côte d'Azur
- Department: Var
- No. of communes: {{{nbcomm}}}
- Established: 2006
- Area: 401.9 km^{2} (155.2 sq mi)
- Population (2019): 28,266
  - Density: 70.33/km^{2} (182.2/sq mi)

The Pays de Fayence is a 'communauté de communes' made up of 9 communes in the departement Var, southeastern France. Its seat is in the town Fayence. Its area is 401.9 km^{2}, and its population was 28,266 in 2019.

== Composition ==
The communauté de communes consists of the following 9 communes:

1. Bagnols-en-Forêt
2. Callian
3. Fayence
4. Mons
5. Montauroux
6. Saint-Paul-en-Forêt
7. Seillans
8. Tanneron
9. Tourrettes
