= Saint-Paul-en-Forêt =

- Commune
- Coat of arms
- Location of Saint-Paul-en-Forêt
- Location within France Location within Provence-Alpes-Côte d'Azur
- Coordinates: 43°34′05″N 6°41′32″E
- Country: France
- Region: Provence-Alpes-Côte d'Azur
- Department: Var
- Arrondissement: Draguignan
- Canton: Roquebrune-sur-Argens
- Intercommunality: Pays de Fayence

Government
  - Mayor (2020–2026): Nicolas Martel
- Area^{1}: 20.26 km^{2} (7.82 sq mi)
- Elevation: 320 m (1,050 ft)
- Highest elevation: 471 m (1,545 ft)
- Lowest elevation: 172 m (564 ft)
- Population (2023): 1,735
  - Density: 85.64/km^{2} (221.8/sq mi)
- Time zone: UTC+01:00 (CET)
  - Summer (DST): UTC+02:00 (CEST)
- INSEE/Postal code: 83117 /83440
- ^{1} French Land Register data, which excludes lakes, ponds, glaciers > 1 km^{2} (0.386 sq mi or 247 acres) and river estuaries.

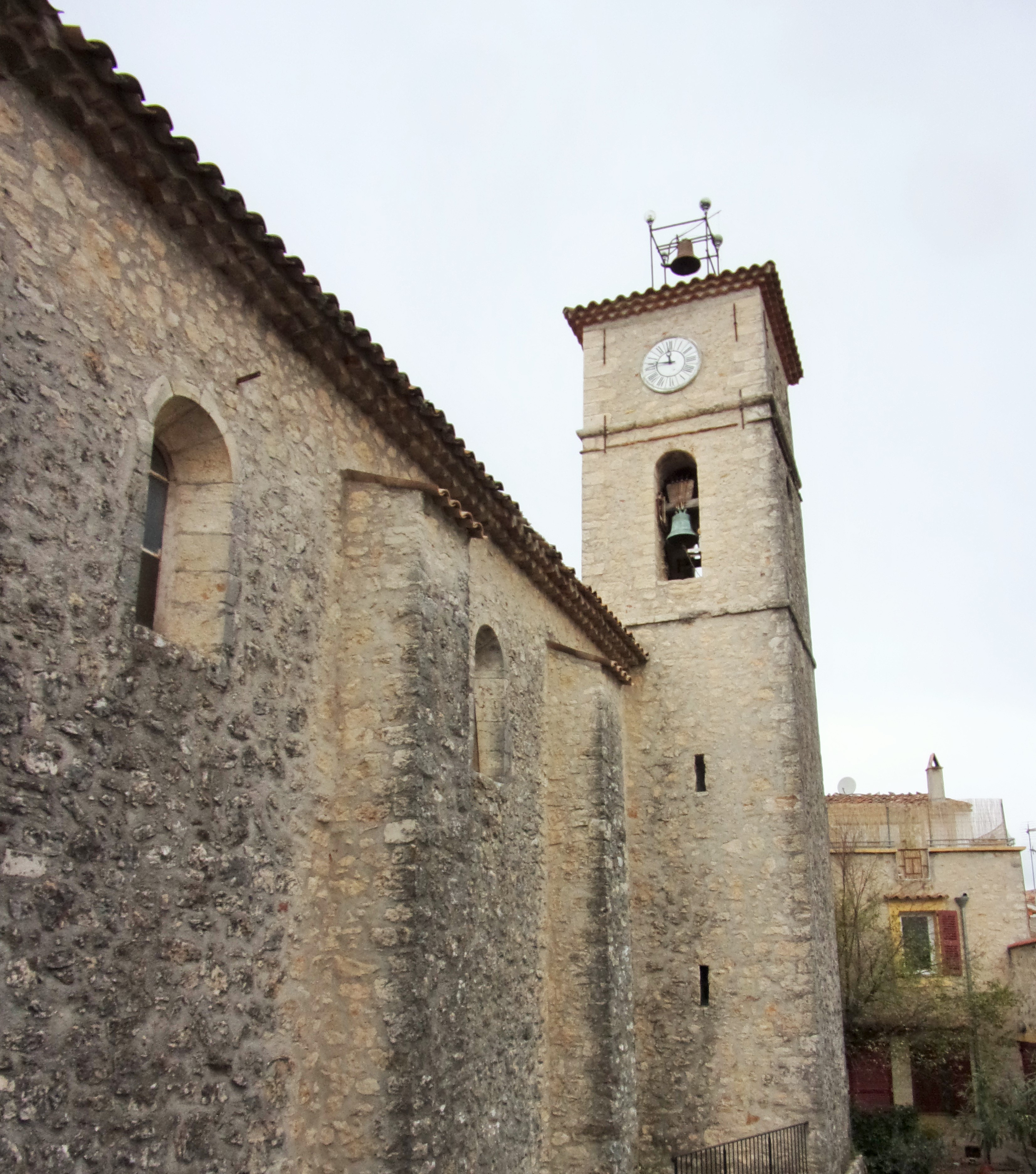
St Paul en Forêt - la kirka turo

Saint-Paul-en-Forêt (French pronunciation: [sɛ̃ pɔl ɑ̃ fɔʁɛ], literally Saint-Paul in Forest; Provençal: Sant Pau de la Galina) is a commune in the Var department in the Provence-Alpes-Côte d'Azur region in southeastern France.

== Government ==
The mayor of Saint-Paul-en-Forêt has been André Bagur since 1971.

== Personalities ==
- Gilbert Becaud

== See also ==
- Communes of the Var department
