= Fayence-Tourrettes Airfield =

Fayence-Tourrettes Airfield Aérodrome Fayence - Tourrettes
- IATA: none; ICAO: LFMF

Summary
- Airport type: Public
- Owner/Operator: Association Aéronautique Provence Côte d'Azur (AAPCA)
- Location: Fayence / Tourrettes, France
- Elevation AMSL: 738 ft / 225 m
- Coordinates: 43°36′29″N 006°42′06″E
- Website: www.aapca.net
- Interactive map of Fayence-Tourrettes Airfield

Runways
Direction	Length		Surface
Direction	m	ft	Surface
10R/28L	830	2,723	Grass
10L/28R	785	2,575	Grass
32	650	2,132	Grass
- Source: French AIP

Fayence-Tourrettes Airfield (French: Aérodrome Fayence - Tourrettes) (ICAO: LFMF) is a small airfield located 1.5 kilometres (1 mi) south of Fayence and Tourrettes, both communes of the Var department in the Provence-Alpes-Côte d'Azur region of southeastern France.

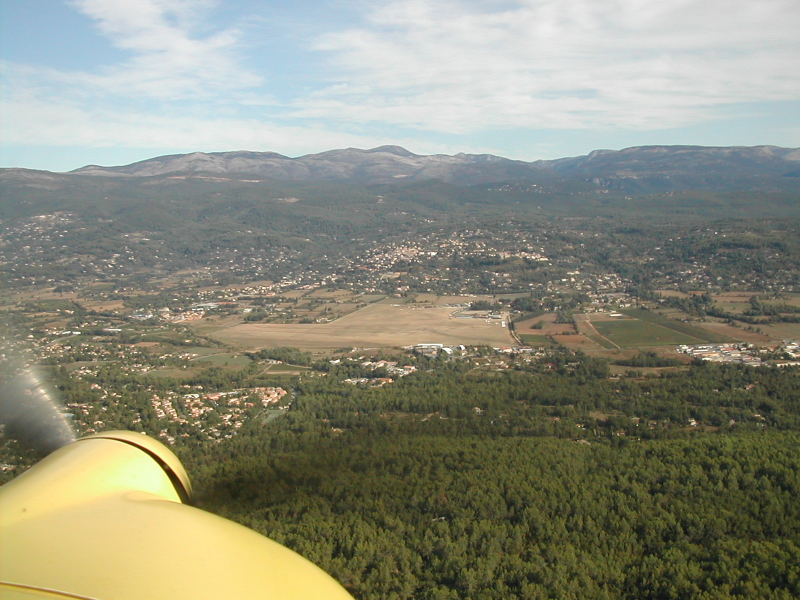

== History ==
On 13 June 1940, 12 Italian fighters FIAT CR.42, from 151° Gruppo of 53° Stormo, of Regia Aeronautica, attacked the airfield, destroying several aircraft on the ground.

Nowadays, it is home to a large gliding club, the Association Aéronautique Provence Côte d'Azur (AAPCA) and to one microlight school. Runway 10L has two small tarmac landing strips for the exclusive use of gliders.
