= Canton of Roquebrune-sur-Argens =

Canton in the Draguignan arrondissement, France

Coordinates: 43.44°N 6.64°E

The canton of Roquebrune-sur-Argens is an administrative division of the Var department, southeastern France. It was created at the French canton reorganisation which came into effect in March 2015. Its seat is in Roquebrune-sur-Argens.

It consists of the following communes:

1. Bagnols-en-Forêt
2. Callian
3. Fayence
4. Mons
5. Montauroux
6. Puget-sur-Argens
7. Roquebrune-sur-Argens
8. Saint-Paul-en-Forêt
9. Seillans
10. Tanneron
11. Tourrettes
