= Lac de Saint-Cassien =

Lake in Var, France

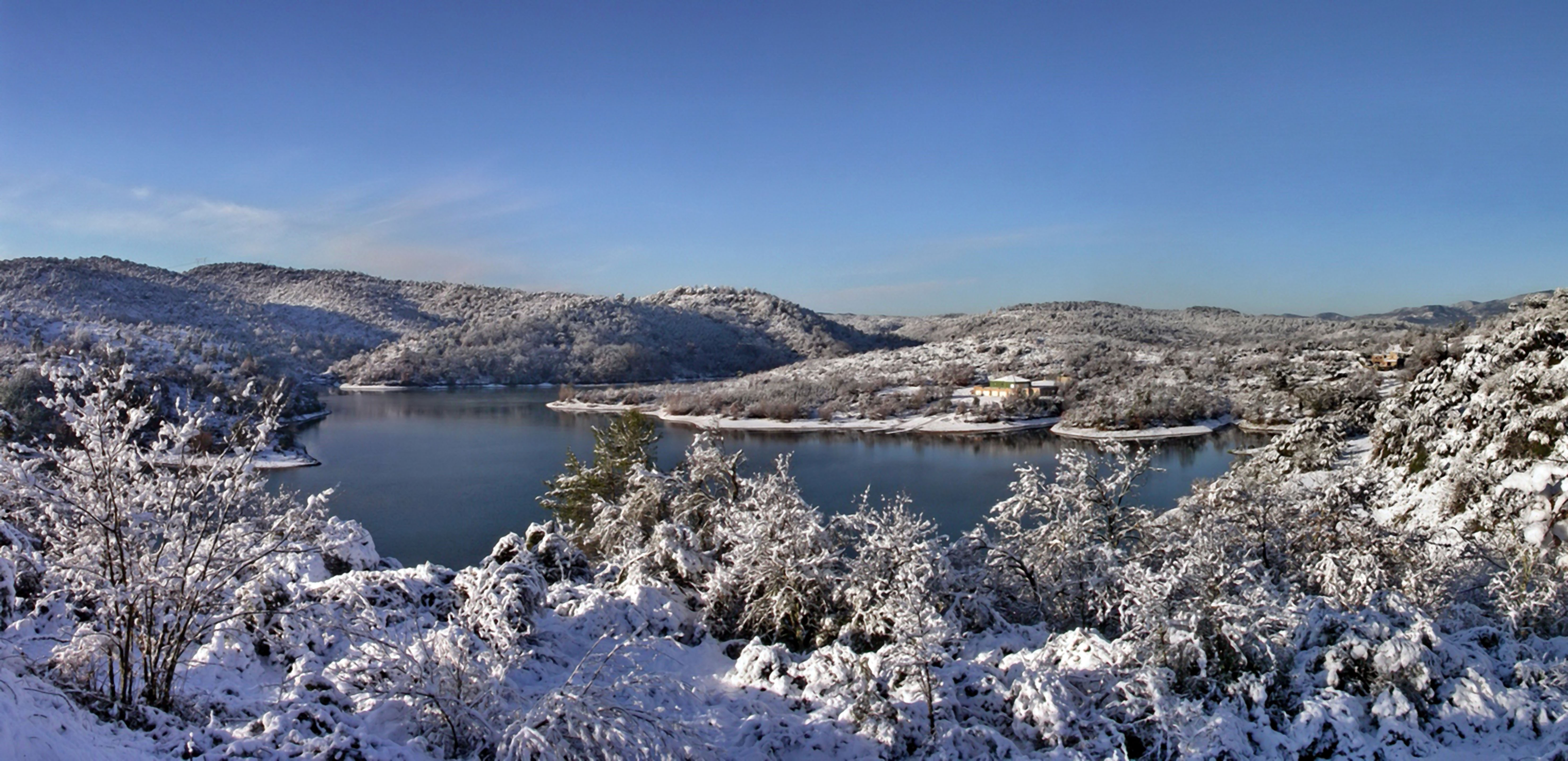
- The Lac de Saint-Cassien in winter

- Location within Provence-Alpes-Côte d'Azur
- Location: Var
- Coordinates: 43°35′N 6°48′E
- Type: Artificial
- Primary outflows: Biançon
- Catchment area: 355 km^{2} (137 sq mi)
- Basin countries: France
- Surface area: 4.2 km^{2} (1.6 sq mi)
- Water volume: 60,000,000 m^{3} (2.1×10^{9} cu ft)
- Surface elevation: 147 m (482 ft)

The Lac de Saint-Cassien (French pronunciation: [lak də sɛ̃kasjɛ̃]; Lake of Saint-Cassien) is a reservoir in the Var department, Southern France, not far from the border with Alpes-Maritimes. It is bordered by Montauroux, Tanneron and Les Adrets-de-l'Estérel. At an elevation of 147 m (482 ft), its surface area is 4.2 km^{2} (1.6 sq mi).

The EDF Barrage de Saint-Cassien (Saint-Cassien Dam), northeast of the lake in the commune of Tanneron, was put into service in 1966. Both the dam and reservoir were named after John Cassian (Jean Cassien), a Christian saint who founded the Abbey of St Victor in Marseille.
