= Bagnols-en-Forêt =

Bagnols-en-Forêt Banhòus (Occitan)
- Commune
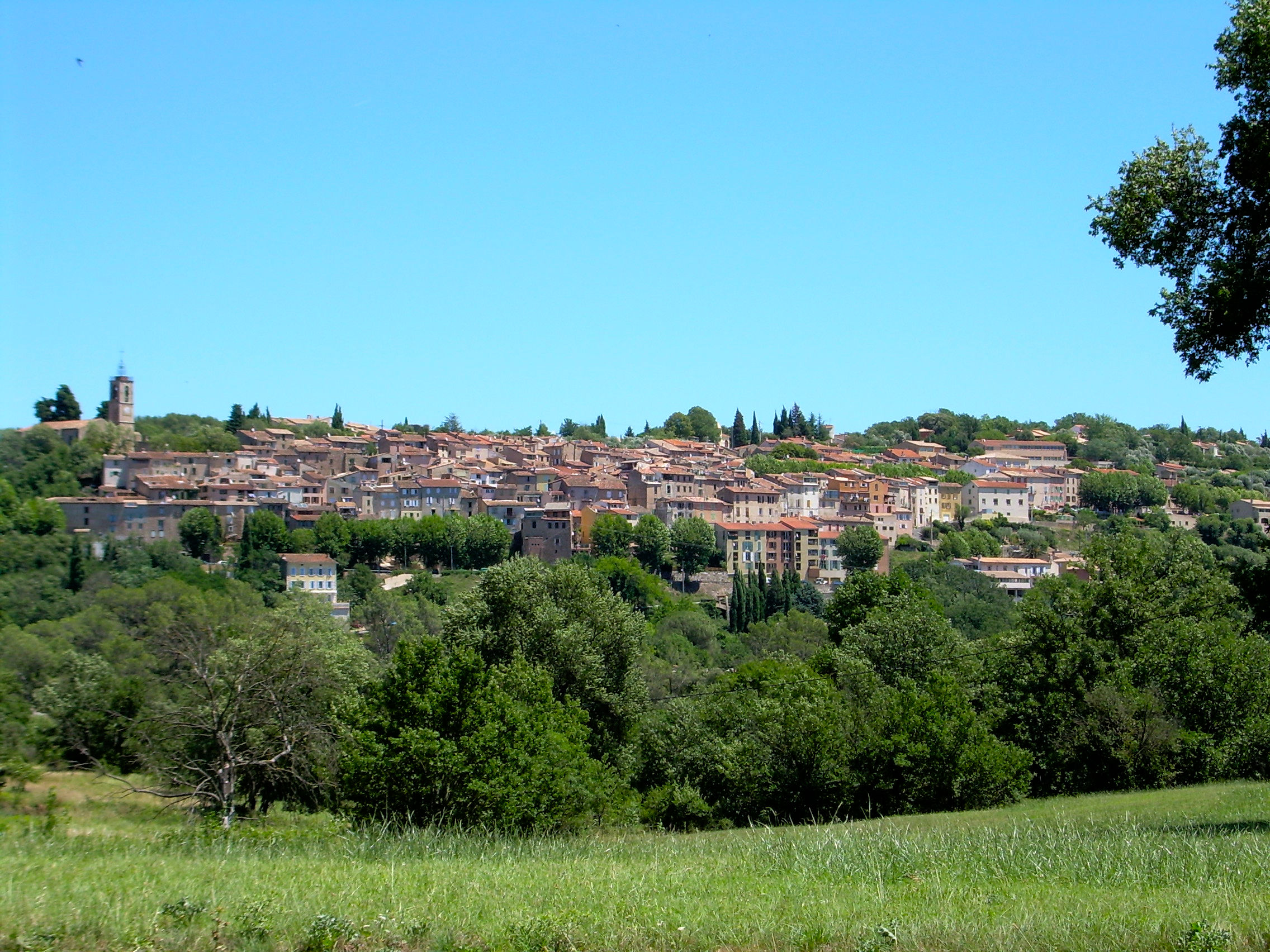
- A general view of the village

- Coat of arms
- Location of Bagnols-en-Forêt
- Location within France Location within Provence-Alpes-Côte d'Azur
- Coordinates: 43°32′19″N 6°41′56″E
- Country: France
- Region: Provence-Alpes-Côte d'Azur
- Department: Var
- Arrondissement: Draguignan
- Canton: Roquebrune-sur-Argens
- Intercommunality: Pays de Fayence

Government
  - Mayor (2020–2026): René Bouchard
- Area^{1}: 42.9 km^{2} (16.6 sq mi)
- Elevation: 300 m (980 ft)
- Highest elevation: 561 m (1,841 ft)
- Lowest elevation: 56 m (184 ft)
- Population (2023): 3,194
  - Density: 74.5/km^{2} (193/sq mi)
- Time zone: UTC+01:00 (CET)
  - Summer (DST): UTC+02:00 (CEST)
- INSEE/Postal code: 83008 /83600
- ^{1} French Land Register data, which excludes lakes, ponds, glaciers > 1 km^{2} (0.386 sq mi or 247 acres) and river estuaries.

Bagnols-en-Forêt (French pronunciation: [baɲɔl ɑ̃ fɔʁɛ]; Occitan: Banhòus) is a commune in Var department in the Provence-Alpes-Côte d'Azur region in Southeastern France.

== Population ==
Historical population
Year	Pop.	±% p.a.
1968	562	—
1975	682	+2.80%
1982	889	+3.86%
1990	1,274	+4.60%
1999	1,672	+3.07%
2007	2,215	+3.58%
2012	2,565	+2.98%
2017	2,788	+1.68%
2023	3,194	+2.29%
Source: INSEE

== Twin towns — sister cities ==
Bagnols-en-Forêt is twinned with:

- Pieve di Teco, Italy (1990)

== Notable people ==
- Pierre-Jean Porro (1750–1831), classical guitarist, composer and music publisher

== See also ==
- Communes of the Var department
