= Tourrettes, Var =

Tourrettes
- Commune
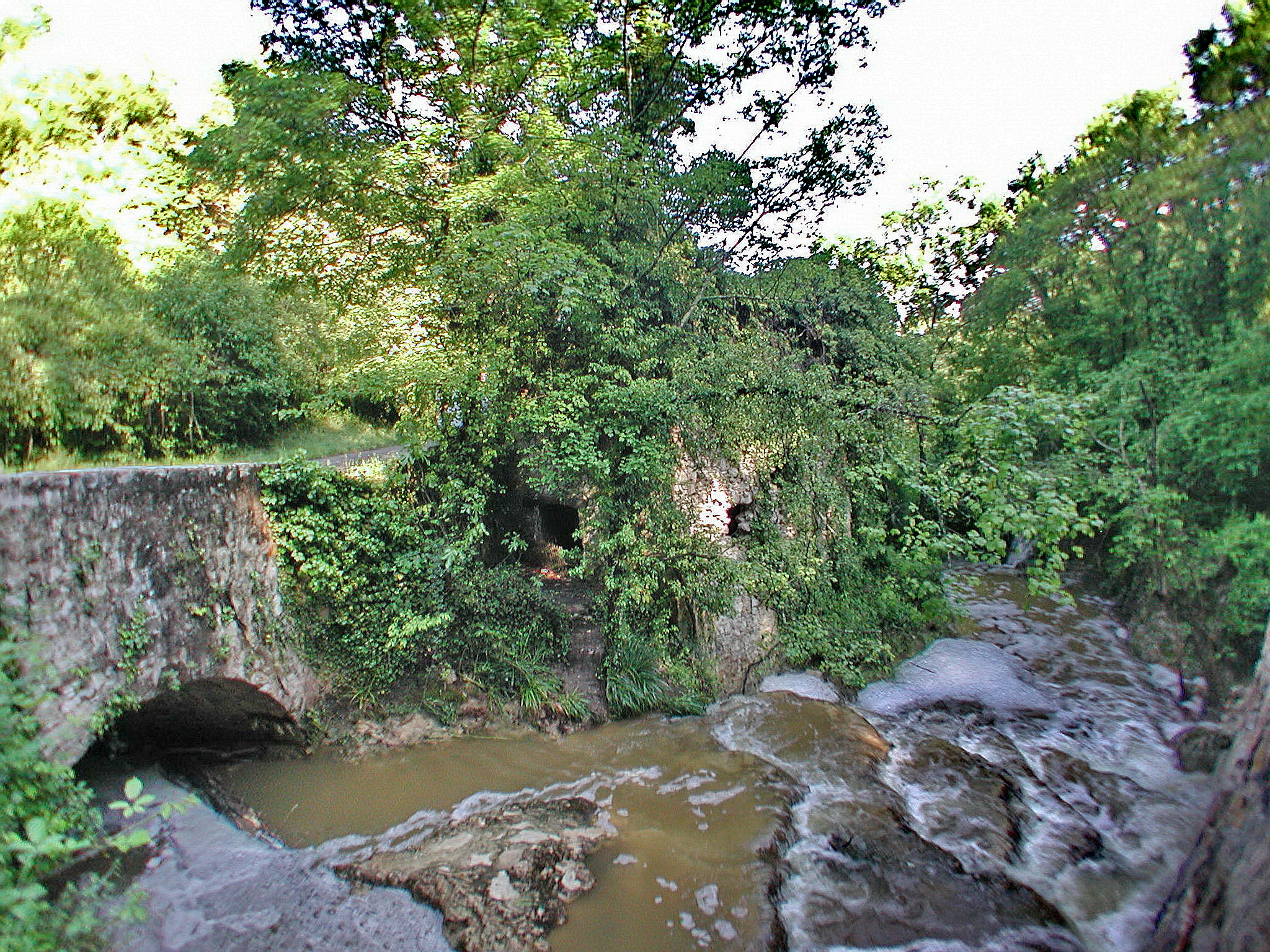
- Chautard river with an ancient watermill, in Tourrettes

- Coat of arms
- Location of Tourrettes
- Location within France Location within Provence-Alpes-Côte d'Azur
- Coordinates: 43°37′27″N 6°42′11″E
- Country: France
- Region: Provence-Alpes-Côte d'Azur
- Department: Var
- Arrondissement: Draguignan
- Canton: Roquebrune-sur-Argens
- Intercommunality: Pays de Fayence

Government
  - Mayor (2020–2026): Camille Bouge
- Area^{1}: 33.99 km^{2} (13.12 sq mi)
- Elevation: 334 m (1,096 ft)
- Highest elevation: 592 m (1,942 ft)
- Lowest elevation: 155 m (509 ft)
- Population (2023): 2,972
  - Density: 87.44/km^{2} (226.5/sq mi)
- Time zone: UTC+01:00 (CET)
  - Summer (DST): UTC+02:00 (CEST)
- INSEE/Postal code: 83138 /83440
- ^{1} French Land Register data, which excludes lakes, ponds, glaciers > 1 km^{2} (0.386 sq mi or 247 acres) and river estuaries.

Tourrettes (French pronunciation: [tuʁɛt]; Occitan: Torretas) is a commune in the Var department in the Provence-Alpes-Côte d'Azur region in southeastern France.

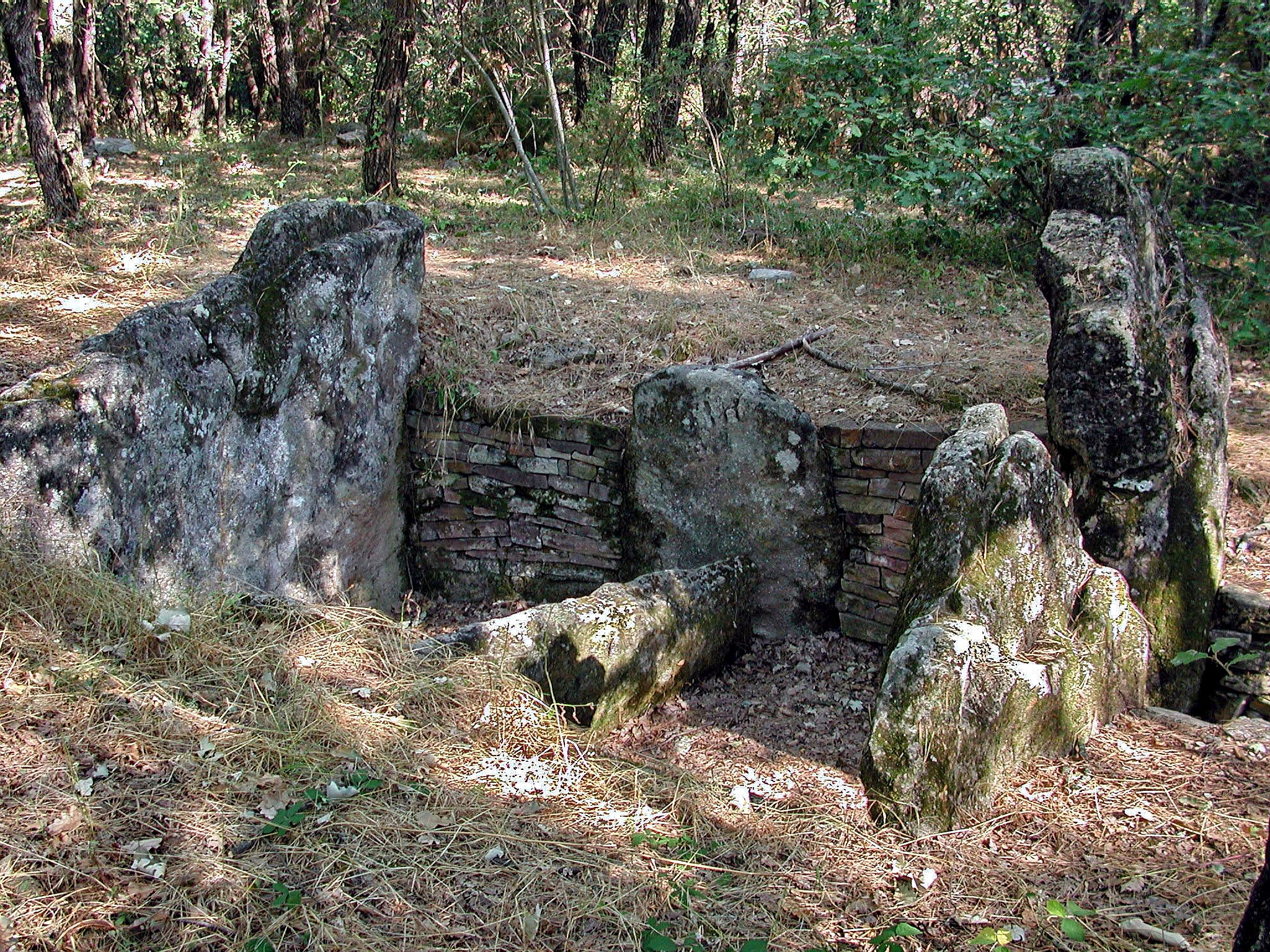
Dolmen de Tourrettes

Tourrettes is one of a series of "perched villages" overlooking the plain between the southern Alps and the Esterel massif, which borders the sea between Cannes and Saint-Raphaël. Tourrettes is popular with tourists. The village is located on the road to Mons, which later on joins the Route Napoléon (linking Nice to Grenoble through the Alps).

In the recent years a high-standing golf resort has settled in Tourrettes, the Domaine de Terre Blanche.

The aerodrome of Fayence-Tourrettes was one of the most active in Europe.

== Geography ==
=== Climate ===
Tourrettes has a hot-summer Mediterranean climate (Köppen climate classification Csa). The average annual temperature in Tourrettes is 14.7 °C (58.5 °F). The average annual rainfall is 874.4 mm (34.43 in) with October as the wettest month. The temperatures are highest on average in August, at around 23.7 °C (74.7 °F), and lowest in January, at around 7.2 °C (45.0 °F). The highest temperature ever recorded in Tourrettes was 41.1 °C (106.0 °F) on 6 August 2003; the coldest temperature ever recorded was −15.5 °C (4.1 °F) on 9 January 1985.

Climate data for Tourrettes (1981−2010 normals, extremes 1979−2011)
Month	Jan	Feb	Mar	Apr	May	Jun	Jul	Aug	Sep	Oct	Nov	Dec	Year
Record high °C (°F)	24.7 (76.5)	25.1 (77.2)	27.3 (81.1)	29.8 (85.6)	33.7 (92.7)	39.4 (102.9)	41.0 (105.8)	41.1 (106.0)	35.6 (96.1)	30.7 (87.3)	27.3 (81.1)	23.0 (73.4)	41.1 (106.0)
Mean daily maximum °C (°F)	12.9 (55.2)	13.9 (57.0)	16.6 (61.9)	18.7 (65.7)	23.1 (73.6)	27.3 (81.1)	31.1 (88.0)	31.3 (88.3)	27.0 (80.6)	21.7 (71.1)	16.3 (61.3)	13.2 (55.8)	21.1 (70.0)
Daily mean °C (°F)	7.2 (45.0)	7.7 (45.9)	10.2 (50.4)	12.5 (54.5)	16.5 (61.7)	20.3 (68.5)	23.4 (74.1)	23.7 (74.7)	19.9 (67.8)	15.7 (60.3)	10.7 (51.3)	7.8 (46.0)	14.7 (58.5)
Mean daily minimum °C (°F)	1.4 (34.5)	1.6 (34.9)	3.8 (38.8)	6.2 (43.2)	9.9 (49.8)	13.3 (55.9)	15.7 (60.3)	16.0 (60.8)	12.9 (55.2)	9.7 (49.5)	5.1 (41.2)	2.3 (36.1)	8.2 (46.8)
Record low °C (°F)	−15.5 (4.1)	−9.5 (14.9)	−7.5 (18.5)	−3.0 (26.6)	0.0 (32.0)	4.5 (40.1)	8.0 (46.4)	7.5 (45.5)	3.5 (38.3)	−2.6 (27.3)	−8.0 (17.6)	−8.2 (17.2)	−15.5 (4.1)
Average precipitation mm (inches)	84.5 (3.33)	47.0 (1.85)	56.2 (2.21)	86.0 (3.39)	71.6 (2.82)	47.2 (1.86)	20.4 (0.80)	34.5 (1.36)	88.8 (3.50)	133.6 (5.26)	108.9 (4.29)	95.7 (3.77)	874.4 (34.43)
Average precipitation days (≥ 1.0 mm)	5.9	4.9	5.6	8.1	6.6	4.6	2.5	3.2	5.4	7.5	7.1	6.7	68.0
Source: Météo-France

== Population ==
Historical population
Year	Pop.	±% p.a.
1968	743	—
1975	897	+2.73%
1982	1,067	+2.51%
1990	1,375	+3.22%
1999	2,180	+5.25%
2007	2,605	+2.25%
2012	2,823	+1.62%
2017	2,884	+0.43%
2023	2,972	+0.50%
Source: INSEE

== See also ==
- Communes of the Var department
