= Mons, Var =

Mons
- Commune
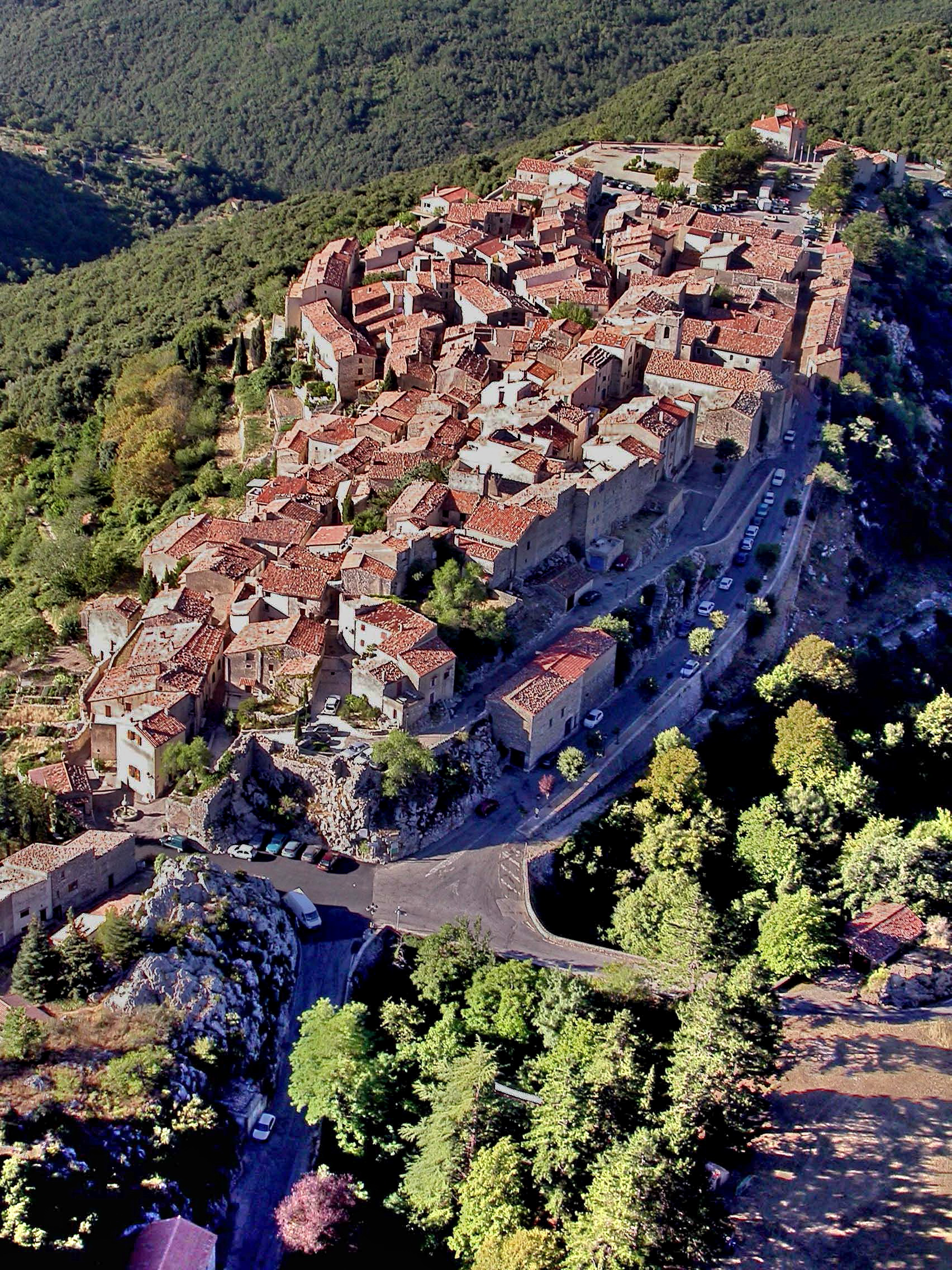
- Aeral view of Mons

- Coat of arms
- Location of Mons
- Location within France Location within Provence-Alpes-Côte d'Azur
- Coordinates: 43°41′32″N 6°42′54″E
- Country: France
- Region: Provence-Alpes-Côte d'Azur
- Department: Var
- Arrondissement: Draguignan
- Canton: Roquebrune-sur-Argens
- Intercommunality: Pays de Fayence

Government
  - Mayor (2020–2026): Patrick de Clarens
- Area^{1}: 76.63 km^{2} (29.59 sq mi)
- Elevation: 811 m (2,661 ft)
- Highest elevation: 1,712 m (5,617 ft)
- Lowest elevation: 235 m (771 ft)
- Population (2023): 909
  - Density: 11.9/km^{2} (30.7/sq mi)
- Time zone: UTC+01:00 (CET)
  - Summer (DST): UTC+02:00 (CEST)
- INSEE/Postal code: 83080 /83440
- ^{1} French Land Register data, which excludes lakes, ponds, glaciers > 1 km^{2} (0.386 sq mi or 247 acres) and river estuaries.

Mons (French pronunciation: [mɔ̃s]; Occitan: Monts or Mons) is a commune in the Var department in the Provence-Alpes-Côte d'Azur region in southeastern France.

== Geography ==
Situated at an altitude of 814 metres the commune of Mons encompasses a vast territory of 80 km^{2} (31 sq mi) in the Var, Provence, ranging from 214 metres (at the confluent of the Siagne and the Siagnole rivers) to 1715 metres at the summit of Mont-Lachens. This explains the variety of different scenery found on the territory of the commune, as well as the diversity of its vegetation, but also accounts for the fact that it is sparsely cultivated. There are exceptional views from the village (from the Place Saint Sebastien), ranging from Menton to the East all the way to Toulon in the West.

== Transportation ==
With today's network of roads, Mons is a mere 30 km (19 mi) from Grasse, 48 km (30 mi) from Draguignan, 50 km (31 mi) from Saint-Raphaël, 48 km (30 mi) from Cannes and 68 km (42 mi) from Nice.

== Personalities related to the municipality ==
Famous members of the Villeneuve family, including:

- A saint, Roseline of Villeneuve, OCart

Other personalities related to the municipality :

- Pierre Hemmer, one of the Internet pioneers in Switzerland, deceased in Mons.

== Miscellaneous ==
The strong, distinctive character of the village of Mons, its calm and beauty have made it the jewel of Varois hinterland, situated as it is, at the confines of the Gavot uplands. The Monsois have had to grapple with adversity over the centuries: their tenacity and courage has forged them into a hardy, solid community, and they bear the nickname of "Chinois de Provence" (the Chinese of Provence).

== See also ==
- Communes of the Var department
