= Callian, Var =

Callian Calian (Occitan)
- Commune
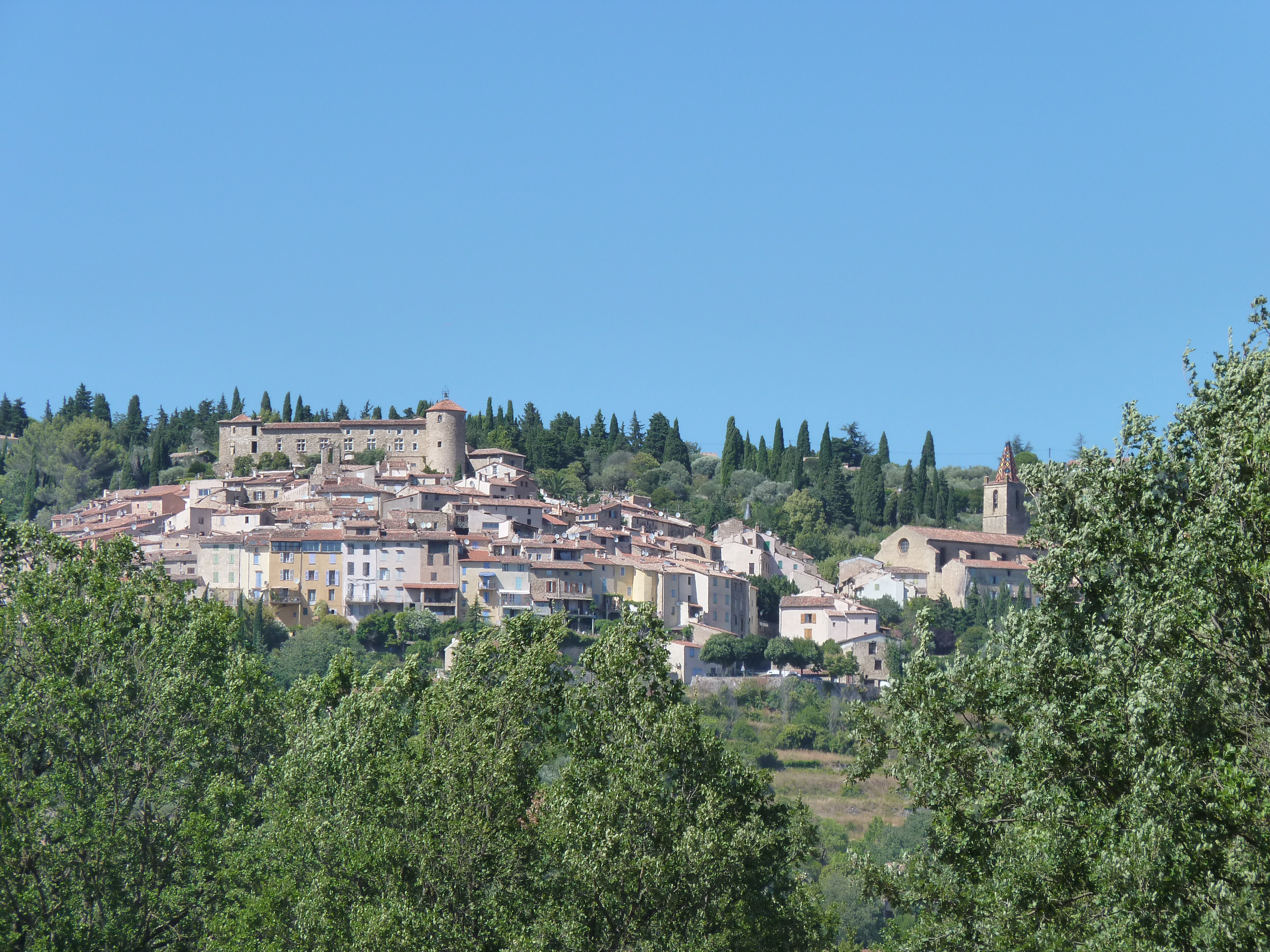
- A general view of Callian

- Coat of arms
- Location of Callian
- Location within France Location within Provence-Alpes-Côte d'Azur
- Coordinates: 43°37′20″N 6°45′11″E
- Country: France
- Region: Provence-Alpes-Côte d'Azur
- Department: Var
- Arrondissement: Draguignan
- Canton: Roquebrune-sur-Argens
- Intercommunality: Pays de Fayence

Government
  - Mayor (2020–2026): François Cavallier
- Area^{1}: 25.42 km^{2} (9.81 sq mi)
- Highest elevation: 581 m (1,906 ft)
- Lowest elevation: 96 m (315 ft)
- Population (2023): 3,823
  - Density: 150.4/km^{2} (389.5/sq mi)
- Time zone: UTC+01:00 (CET)
  - Summer (DST): UTC+02:00 (CEST)
- INSEE/Postal code: 83029 /83440
- ^{1} French Land Register data, which excludes lakes, ponds, glaciers > 1 km^{2} (0.386 sq mi or 247 acres) and river estuaries.

Callian (French pronunciation: [kaljɑ̃]; Occitan: Calian) is a commune in the Var department in the Provence-Alpes-Côte d'Azur region in Southeastern France.

== Population ==
Historical population
Year	Pop.	±% p.a.
1968	942	—
1975	1,203	+3.56%
1982	1,449	+2.69%
1990	1,790	+2.68%
1999	2,445	+3.53%
2007	3,004	+2.61%
2012	3,346	+2.18%
2017	3,206	−0.85%
2023	3,823	+2.98%
Source: INSEE

== Notable persons ==
- Michel Darluc (1717-1783), doctor and naturalist, lived in Callian
- Catherine Dior (1917-2008), resistance fighter, flower trader, farmer and sister of Christian Dior, lived and cultivated roses in Callian

== Twin towns ==
Callian is twinned with:

- Calliano, Piedmont, Italy
- Calliano, Trentino, Italy

== See also ==
- Communes of the Var department
- Official Website of the Village of Callian (French)
