= Montauroux =

Montauroux Montauron (Occitan)
- Commune
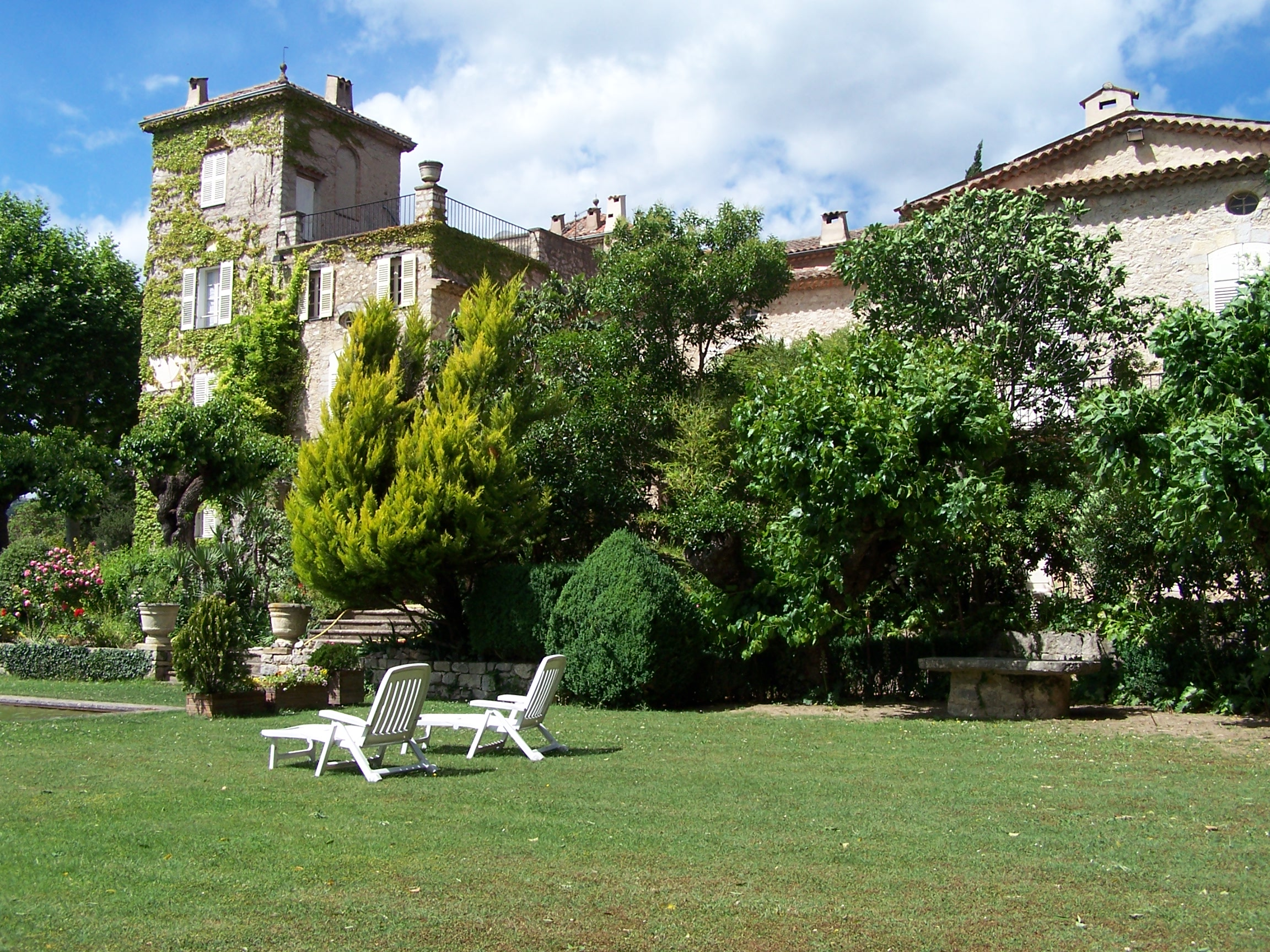
- The Château de la Colle-Noire, in Montauroux

- Coat of arms
- Location of Montauroux
- Location within France Location within Provence-Alpes-Côte d'Azur
- Coordinates: 43°37′09″N 6°45′57″E
- Country: France
- Region: Provence-Alpes-Côte d'Azur
- Department: Var
- Arrondissement: Draguignan
- Canton: Roquebrune-sur-Argens
- Intercommunality: Pays de Fayence

Government
  - Mayor (2020–2026): Jean-Yves Huet
- Area^{1}: 33.41 km^{2} (12.90 sq mi)
- Highest elevation: 400 m (1,300 ft)
- Lowest elevation: 150 m (490 ft)
- Population (2023): 7,183
  - Density: 215.0/km^{2} (556.8/sq mi)
- Time zone: UTC+01:00 (CET)
  - Summer (DST): UTC+02:00 (CEST)
- INSEE/Postal code: 83081 /83440
- ^{1} French Land Register data, which excludes lakes, ponds, glaciers > 1 km^{2} (0.386 sq mi or 247 acres) and river estuaries.

Montauroux (French pronunciation: [mɔ̃toʁu]; Occitan: Montauron) is a commune in the Var department in the Provence-Alpes-Côte d'Azur region in Southeastern France.

Its neighbour town is the smaller, picturesque Callian, which can be seen across a small valley.

== Geography ==
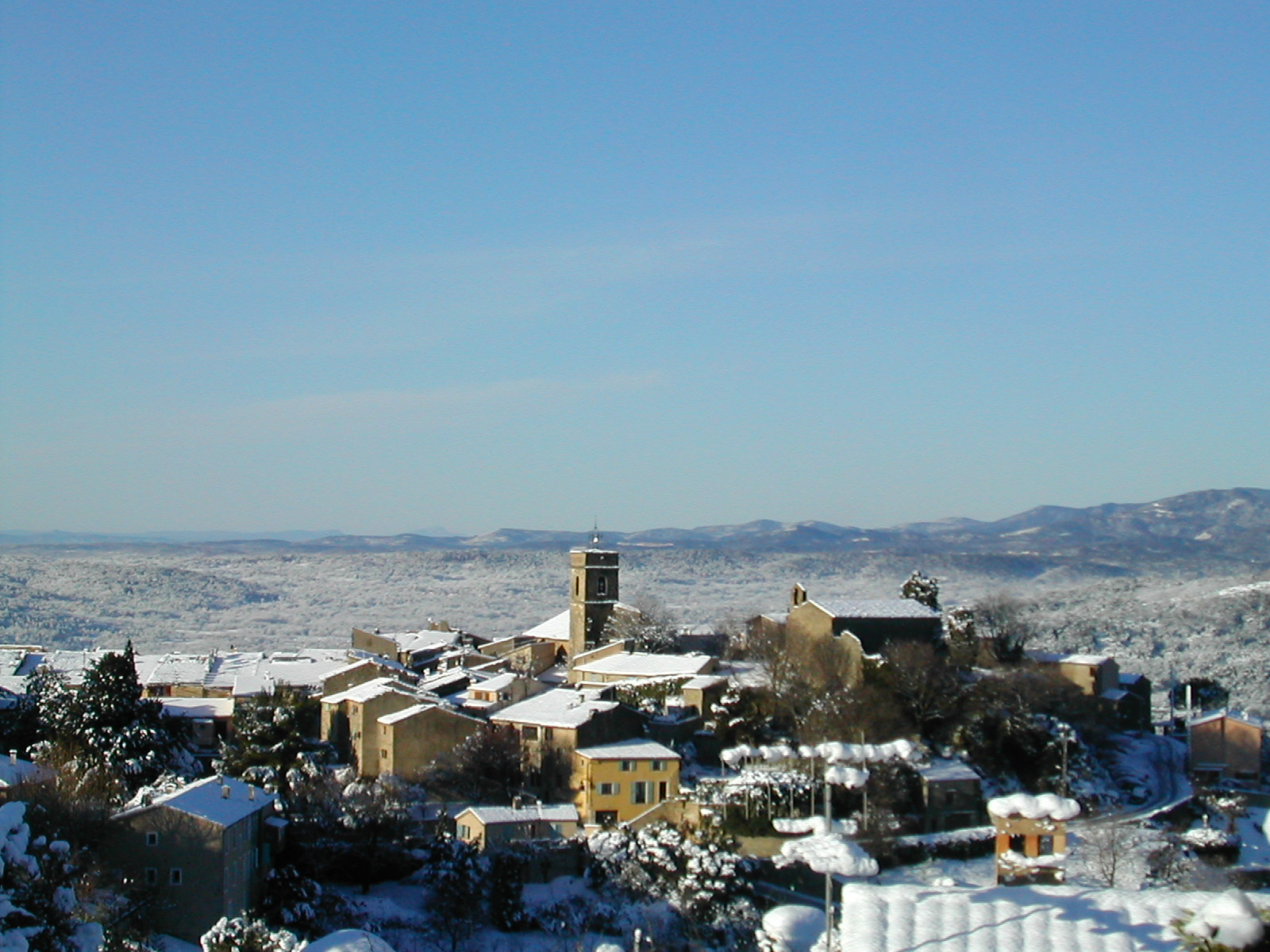
Montauroux in the snow

Montauroux is situated in the east of the Var and at the border of the Alpes-Maritimes. Montauroux rises in tiers of altitudes from 150 m to 400 m. The village has a southern exposure, facing the Esterel massif and the St Cassien Lake. Montauroux is located midway between the sea which is 30 km (19 mi) away and the first ski resort which is 40 km (25 mi), away. Montauroux benefits from an exceptional amount of sunny days and is visited by tourists in the summer months, many hotels are often fully booked for the summer by mid-April or earlier.

It is also part of the Pays de Fayence, a communauté de communes.

== Demographics ==
Its inhabitants are called Montaurousiens in French.

Historical population
Year	Pop.	±% p.a.
1968	1,053	—
1975	1,375	+3.89%
1982	1,997	+5.48%
1990	2,773	+4.19%
1999	4,017	+4.20%
2007	5,048	+2.90%
2012	6,019	+3.58%
2017	6,411	+1.27%
2023	7,183	+1.91%
Source: INSEE

== Climate ==
In 2010, the climate of the commune was a clear Mediterranean climate, according to a study by the French National Centre for Scientific Research based on a series of data covering the period 1971-2000. In 2020, Météo-France characterised this as abundant rainfall in autumn and winter (250 to 300 mm in autumn), very good sunshine in summer (insolation fraction > 75%), and a mild winter (8 °C) with little fog.

For the period 1971-2000, the average annual temperature is 13.2 °C, with an annual thermal range of 15.7 °C . The average annual cumulative precipitation is 1,003mm, with 6.3 days of precipitation in January and 2.7 days in July. For the period 1991-2020, the average annual temperature observed at the nearest Météo-France meteorological station, “St Cézaire sur Siagne”, in the commune of Saint-Cézaire-sur-Siagne, 4 km as the crow flies, is 13.3 °C and the average annual precipitation is 970.5mm. The maximum temperature recorded at this station is 36.4 °C, reached on 28 June 2019; the minimum temperature is −8.1 °C, reached on 12 February 2010.

Climate data for Saint-Cézaire-sur-Siagne, 1991–2020 normals, records 1991–present
Month	Jan	Feb	Mar	Apr	May	Jun	Jul	Aug	Sep	Oct	Nov	Dec	Year
Record high °C (°F)	23.5 (74.3)	24.5 (76.1)	23.1 (73.6)	24.7 (76.5)	29.6 (85.3)	36.4 (97.5)	36.1 (97.0)	35.6 (96.1)	31.4 (88.5)	28.9 (84.0)	24.8 (76.6)	23.0 (73.4)	36.4 (97.5)
Mean daily maximum °C (°F)	10.0 (50.0)	10.6 (51.1)	13.4 (56.1)	16.7 (62.1)	19.6 (67.3)	24.2 (75.6)	27.6 (81.7)	27.7 (81.9)	23.4 (74.1)	18.6 (65.5)	13.7 (56.7)	10.7 (51.3)	18.0 (64.4)
Daily mean °C (°F)	6.1 (43.0)	6.3 (43.3)	8.8 (47.8)	12.0 (53.6)	14.8 (58.6)	19.0 (66.2)	22.1 (71.8)	22.0 (71.6)	18.3 (64.9)	14.2 (57.6)	9.8 (49.6)	6.8 (44.2)	13.3 (55.9)
Mean daily minimum °C (°F)	2.2 (36.0)	2.0 (35.6)	4.2 (39.6)	7.2 (45.0)	9.9 (49.8)	13.9 (57.0)	16.5 (61.7)	16.4 (61.5)	13.1 (55.6)	9.8 (49.6)	5.9 (42.6)	3.0 (37.4)	8.7 (47.7)
Record low °C (°F)	−4.5 (23.9)	−8.1 (17.4)	−3.2 (26.2)	−1.8 (28.8)	2.7 (36.9)	5.2 (41.4)	10.7 (51.3)	9.2 (48.6)	4.4 (39.9)	0.4 (32.7)	−3.4 (25.9)	−6.6 (20.1)	−8.1 (17.4)
Average precipitation mm (inches)	75.4 (2.97)	75.2 (2.96)	80.3 (3.16)	81.4 (3.20)	77.4 (3.05)	62.7 (2.47)	23.7 (0.93)	27.3 (1.07)	65.4 (2.57)	127.2 (5.01)	161.1 (6.34)	113.4 (4.46)	970.5 (38.21)
Source: Météo-France

== Routes of communications and transport ==
=== Road network ===
Montauroux is accessible by the departmental road RD 562, linking Draguignan to Grasse, as well as the RD 37, then the national road 7, towards the coast. This road crosses the A8 motorway, at exit 39.

=== Rail network ===
- The town had two stations which are now disused:
  - Montauroux Station (Central-Var Line),
  - Tanneron Station.
- The closest SNCF stations are those of Cannes and Saint-Raphaël-Valescure station, for high speed trains to Paris, Nancy and Nice, and regional trains (TER Provence-Alpes-Côte d'Azur) to Nice, Marseille and Toulon.

=== Public Transport ===
An. on-demand public transport service is available in the canton of Fayence. It allows you to go to the municipalities of Adrets-de-l'Esterel, Fayence, Mons, Callian, Seillans, Saint-Paul-en-Forêt, and Tourrettes. The town is also served by Varlib lines no. 3001, to the Grasse bus station, and line no. 3601, to Fréjus and Saint-Raphaël, as well as line 3002 to Cannes.

=== Air Transport ===
Montauroux is accessible via Nice Côte d'Azur Airport, in the Alpes-Maritimes.

== Seismicity ==
There are three seismicity zones in the Var:

- Zone 0 : Negligible risk. This is the case for many municipalities on the Var coast, as well as part of the municipalities in the center of Var.
- Zone Ia : Very low risk. Mainly concerns the municipalities included in a band going from the Montagne Sainte-Victoire, to the Massif de l'Esterel.
- Zone Ib : Mainly the 21 municipalities in the north of the department.

The commune of Montauroux is in a very low seismic risk zone “Ia”.

== Toponymy ==
There are two different theories on the possible origin of the name “Montauroux”:

- a historical theory is it derives form the placing of a fort on the mountain by knight Peter of Aurosa in 1040;
- a more local and more popular theory is it derives from the Provençal words for 'the mountains exposed to the wind'. Indeed, the west-facing limestone rock bar on which the old village rests, turns pink when the mistral blows in the distance.

== Business and Commerce ==
=== Agriculture ===
- The breeding of cattle, goats and poultry.
- Farmers.

The Pays de Fayence community of communes has developed an Intercommunal Pastoral Orientation Plan (POPI), and an action plan for the maintenance and development of pastoral livestock.

=== Tourism ===
- Restaurants.
- Hotel Le relay du lac, Les Bastides des Chaumettes (Lagrange holiday homes),
- Operation of rural lodges (Haute Vue,...).
- Campsites, Lake leisure camp,
- Guest rooms.

=== Commerce ===
- Local shops and services.
- The Montauroux glassworks: created in 1970, its originally manufactured glass paste mosaics, but is now a glass blower producing a variety of decorative products, jewellery and glass tableware.

== See also ==
- Communes of the Var department
