= Cornelius Gallus =

Roman poet, orator and politician (died 26 BC)

Gaius Cornelius Gallus
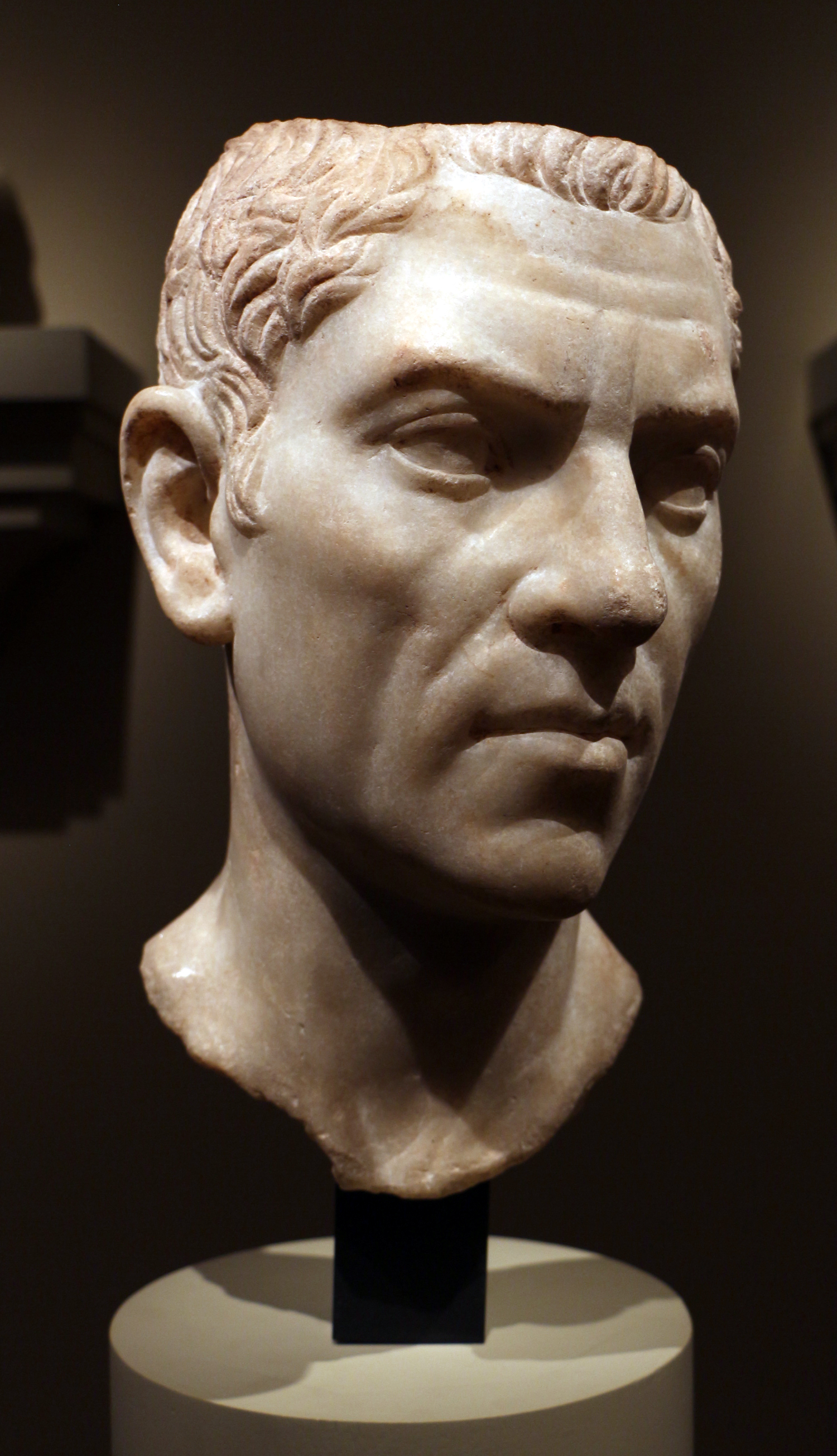
- Statue head possibly depicting Cornelius Gallus, in the Cleveland Museum of Art

Prefect of Egypt
- In office 30 BC – 26 BC
- Monarch: Augustus
- Preceded by: Office established
- Succeeded by: Aelius Gallus

Personal details
- Born: c. 70 BC see § Birthplace
- Died: 26 BC Roman Empire
- Cause of death: Suicide (via exsanguination)
- Occupation: Ancient Roman Orator, poet, politician, and general
- Known for: Battle of Philippi

Gaius Cornelius Gallus (c. 70 – 26 BC) was a Roman poet, orator, politician and military commander, at one time appointed by the Emperor Augustus as prefect of Roman Egypt. Only nine lines of his poetry are extant today, but he was much read in antiquity; Ovid considered him one of the major Latin poets of his age.

== Birthplace ==
The identity of Gallus' purported birthplace, Forum Iulii, is still uncertain, and it is based on the epithet "Foroiuliensis" that Jerome gave to him. In Roman times, there were several cities with this name, but a dispute about Gallus' birthplace between Fréjus and the other cities is attested since the Renaissance. During the 20th century, Ronald Syme took into consideration Fréjus and Cividale del Friuli, and called the former the more likely. Jean-Paul Boucher recognized at least five candidates, and considered Forum Iulii Iriensium (modern Voghera) the most suitable.

It has been also suggested that "Foroiuliensis" could refer not to Gallus' birthplace, but rather to the place where he performed a memorable act, namely the erection of the Vatican obelisk in the Forum Iulium of Alexandria, thus making some generic mentions of Gallia as the sole possible clue about his place of origin.

== Career ==
Born in a humble family, Gallus moved to Rome at an early age where he was taught by the same master as Virgil and Varius Rufus. Virgil, who was in great measure indebted to the influence of Gallus for the restoration of his estate, dedicated his Eclogue X to him. The Erotica Pathemata of Parthenius of Nicaea was also dedicated to Gallus.

In political life Gallus espoused the cause of Octavian and as a reward for his services was made prefect of Egypt. In 30 BC, Cornelius Gallus led a campaign to subdue a revolt in Thebes. He erected a monument in Philae to glorify his accomplishments. Gallus' conduct brought him into disgrace with the emperor and a new prefect was appointed. After his recall, Gallus committed suicide (Cassius Dio, liii 23).

== Poetic reputation ==
Gallus enjoyed a high reputation among his contemporaries as a man of intellect, and Ovid (Tristia, IV) considered him the first of the elegiac poets of Rome. Along with Ennius, Varro Atacinus, Lucretius, Virgil, and Tibullus, Ovid includes him in a list of the most notable Latin poets, writing:

Gallus et Hesperiīs et Gallus nōtus Eōīs;
et sua cum Gallō nōta Lycōris erit.
"Gallus shall be known in the West and in the East;
and with Gallus his Lycoris shall also be known."

He wrote four books of elegies chiefly on his mistress Lycoris (a poetical name for Cytheris, a notorious actress), in which he took for his model Euphorion of Chalcis; he also translated some of this author's works into Latin. He is often thought of as a key figure in the establishment of the genre of Latin love-elegy, and an inspiration for Propertius, Tibullus, and Ovid.

Scholars used to believe, in the absence of any surviving poetry by Gallus and on the basis of his high reputation among his contemporaries, that his poetical gifts were little short of those of Virgil. The classicist Tenney Frank famously declared in 1922: 'What would we not barter of all the sesquipedalian epics of empire for a few pages of Cornelius Gallus, a thousand for each!' The discoveries at Qasr Ibrim have now given us nine lines of Gallus. Coincidentally, one of them mentions Lycoris, ('saddened, Lycoris, by your wanton behaviour'), confirming their authorship.

== The surviving poetry of Gallus ==
Almost nothing by Gallus has survived; until 1978, only one line was known, quoted in Vibius Sequester's De Fluminibus, with regard to the Hypanis river. The line is a dactylic pentameter:

ūnō tellūrēs dīvidit amne duās,
"with its single stream it divides two continents,"

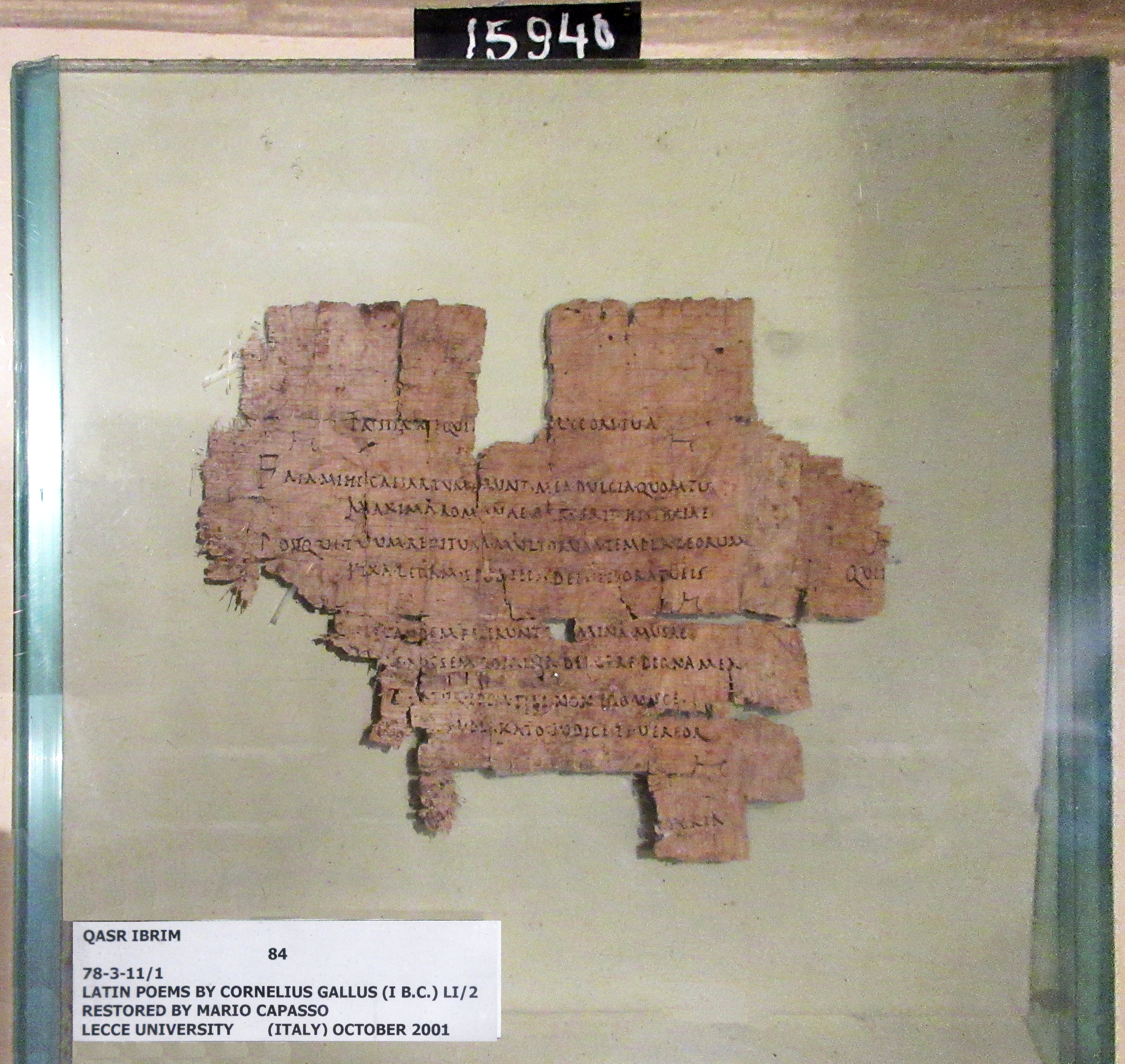
Latin Poetry by Cornelius Gallus from Qasr Ibrim in Cairo Museum, March 2025

Then, in 1978 a papyrus was found at Qasr Ibrim, in Egyptian Nubia, containing nine lines by Gallus, arguably the oldest surviving manuscript of Latin poetry.

The first readable line of the manuscript has only four words and appears to be the end of a poem or epigram complaining about Lycoris's treatment of her lover:

trīstia nēquitiā ... Lycori, tuā
"sad because of your bad behaviour, Lycoris".

It has been argued that the next four lines pay homage to Julius Caesar shortly before his assassination in 44 BC, on the eve of his projected campaign against the Parthians:

Fāta mihi, Caesar, tum erunt mea dulcia, quom tū
maxima Rōmānae pars eris historiae
postque tuum reditum multōrum templa deōrum
fīxa legam spolieis deivitiōra tueis.
"I will count myself blessed by fortune, Caesar, when you
become the greatest part of Roman history;
and when, after your return, I admire the temples of many gods
adorned and enriched with your spoils."

This obsequious compliment need not be taken seriously. Later Augustan poets tended to distance themselves from the world of high politics and often drew a humorous contrast between the martial ambition of their ruler and their own ignoble love affairs. The next, missing, stanza may have subverted the sense, e.g. 'As it is, while you're off winning renown by conquering Parthia, I'm stuck here in Rome, with nothing to do but make love to Lycoris.'

A second, incomplete, block of four lines appears to refer to Lycoris. So long as she likes his verses, Gallus seems to be saying, he can ignore any 'peer reviews' they might attract from critics such as Publius Valerius Cato and Viscus:

. . . tandem fēcērunt carmina Mūsae
quae possim dominā deicere digna meā.
. . . ātur idem tibi, nōn ego, Visce
. . . Katō, iūdice tē vereor.
"At last the Muses have made songs
which I can utter worthy of my mistress.
So long as . . . [they are pleasing?] to you, I am not afraid
to be judged by you, Viscus, . . . nor by you, Cato."

The fragments of four poems attributed to him, first published by Aldus Manutius in 1590 and printed in Alexander Riese's Anthologia Latina (1869), are generally regarded as a forgery; and Pomponius Gauricus's ascription to him of the elegiac verses of Maximianus is no longer accepted.

== Gallus or Roman Scenes of the time of Augustus ==
Gallus is the central figure in a fictionalised but fact-based account of the private life, manner and customs of the Romans: Gallus, or Roman Scenes of the time of Augustus, written by Professor Wilhelm Adolf Becker of Leipzig and published there in 1838. The work was translated into English by the Rev. Frederick Metcalfe in the 1840s. The 1898 Longmans, Green & Co. edition is available as a scan at the Internet Archive and is (2021) being prepared as an e-book by Project Gutenberg. The story of Gallus's fall from Augustus's favour forms the framework for an extensive learned discourse on what life was like in Rome as evidenced in Latin extracts from a number of writers (Suetonius, Martial, Pliny, Ovid, etc.) but most notably quotations in the Ancient Greek from Cassius Dio. The book contains extensive notes and 'Excursus' on various subjects including: the Roman Family, the Roman House, Books and Letters, Baths and Gymnastics, Dress, Banqueting, Drinking, and the Burial of the Dead.

Political offices
New title Annexation of the Ptolemaic Kingdom after the death of Cleopatra VII	Prefect of Egypt; 30–26 BC	Succeeded by Aelius Gallus
