= Argens =

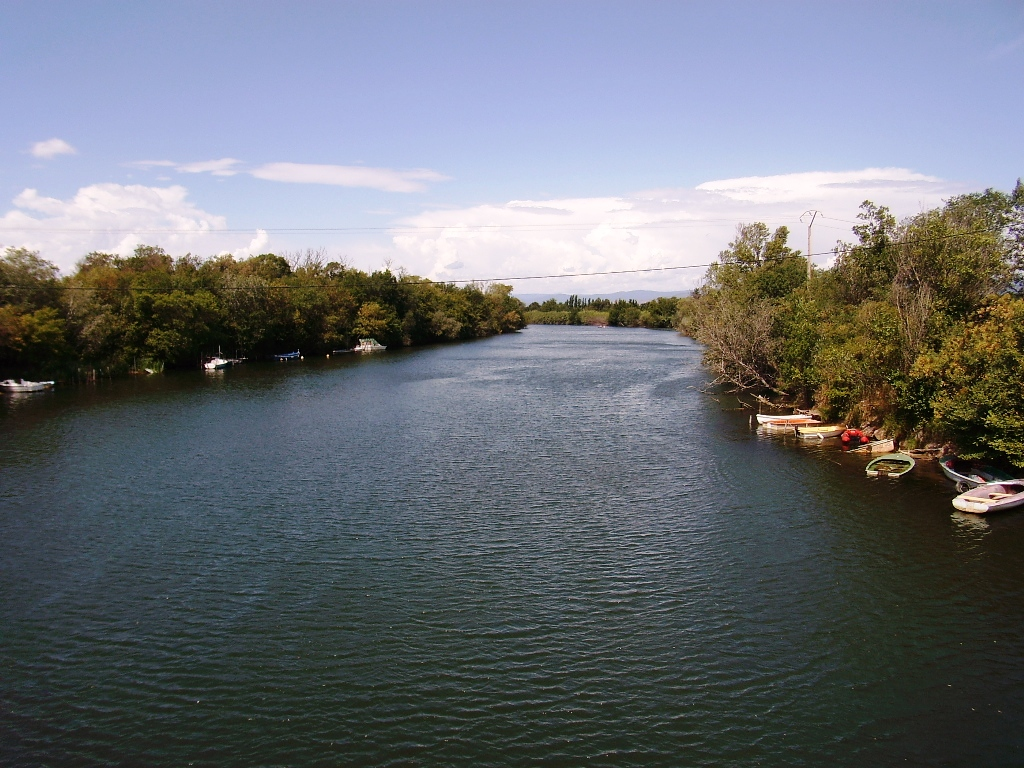

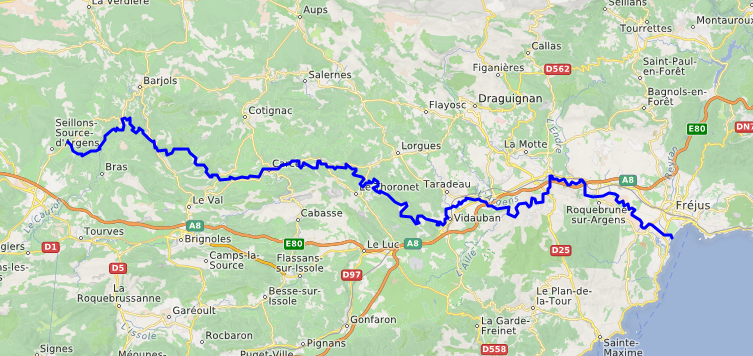
- Native name: L'Argens (French)

Location
- Country: France

Physical characteristics
- Mouth
  - location: Mediterranean Sea
  - coordinates: 43°24′36″N 6°44′14″E
- Length: 116 km (72 mi)
- Basin size: 2,734 km^{2} (1,056 sq mi)

The Argens (French pronunciation: [aʁʒɑ̃(s)]; Occitan: Argens) is a 116 km long river of the French Riviera. Its 2,734 km^{2} (1,056 sq mi) drainage basin is fully included in the Var department.

The river goes through Vidauban, Le Muy, Roquebrune-sur-Argens, Fréjus, then it flows into the Mediterranean Sea, near Fréjus.

== Name ==
The river is attested as ad flumen Argenteum in the 1st century BC, Argenteus in the 1st century AD, and A̓rgentíou (Ἀργεντίου) in the 2nd century. It derives from the Latin or Celtic word for 'silver'.

== Rivers flowing into Argens ==
- Blavet
- Endre
- Bresque
- Caramy
  - Issole
- Cassole
- Ribeirotte
- Florieye
- Aille
- Nartuby
- Reyran
- Cauron
