= Gallus; or, Roman scenes of the time of Augustus =

1938 book by Wilhelm Adolf Becker

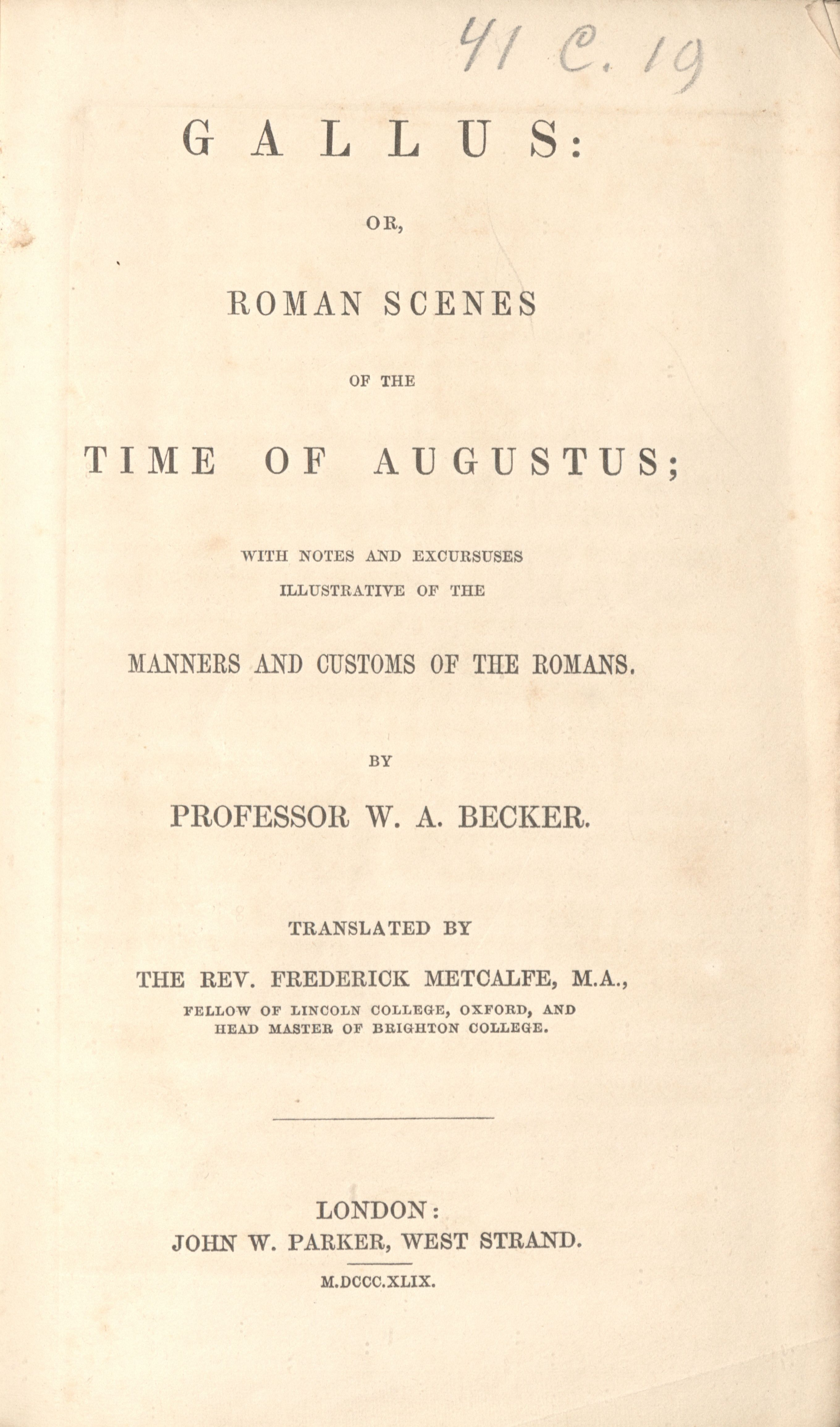
Title page

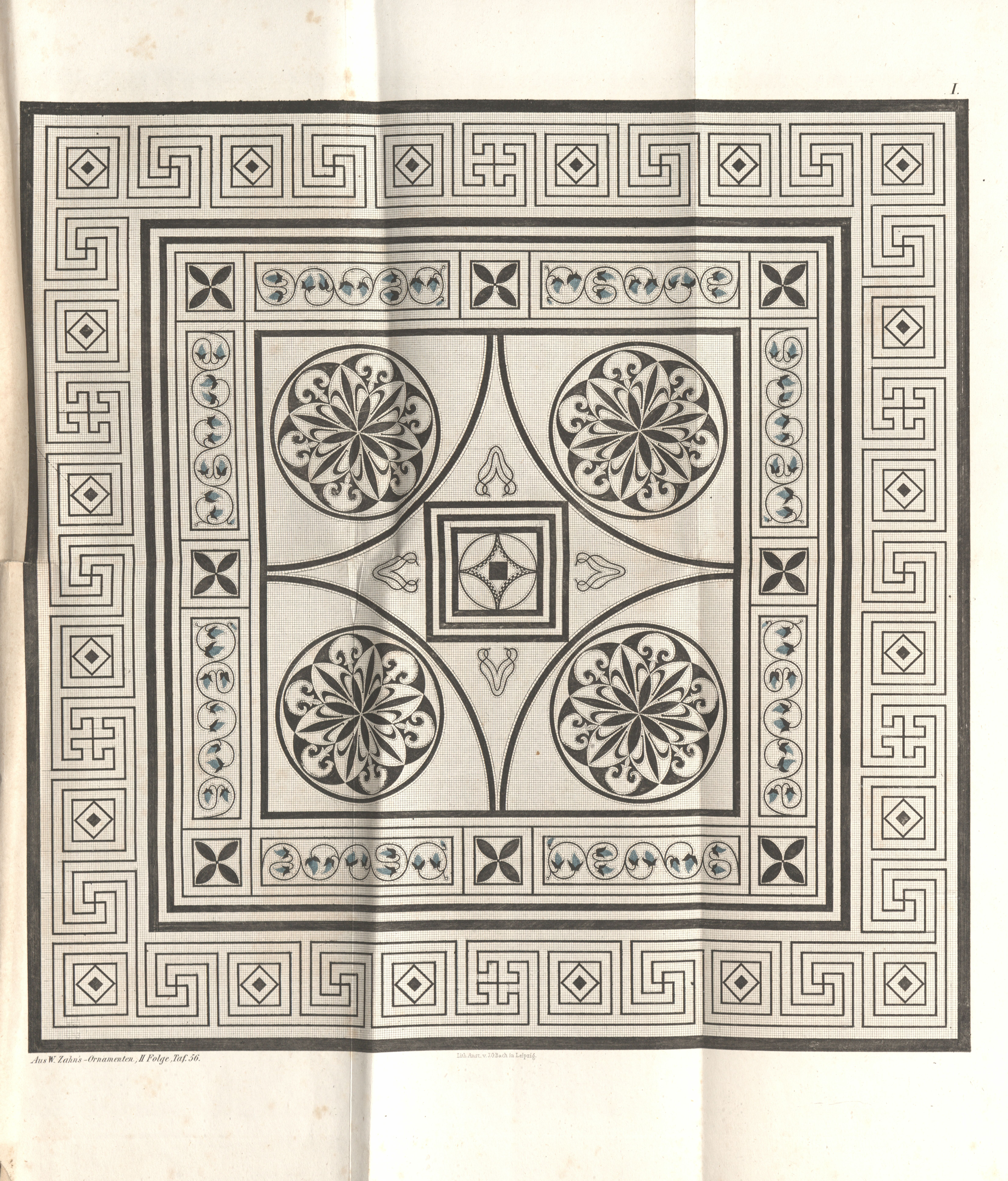
Page from the book

Gallus, oder, Römische Scenen aus der Zeit Augusts: zur genaueren Kenntniss des römischen Privatlebens is a German book written by Wilhelm Adolf Becker, published in 1938. The book was translated into English and renamed Gallus; or, Roman scenes of the time of Augustus: with notes and excursuses illustrative of the manners and customs of the Romans by Frederick Metcalfe in 1849. It is about the life of Cornelius Gallus and describes Roman domestic life.

== Context ==
The author of the book, Wilhelm Adolf Becker, was a German author, historian, and professor of archeology. His father, Wilhelm Gottlieb Becker, was of the same occupation and published Augusteum, a book on Roman antiquities in the German city Dresden in the early 1800s. This led him to write several books about Roman authors and their works early in his career. His studies on Plautus' comedies emphasised his interest in Roman domestic life. The studies led to two books being published: De comicis Romanorum fabulis maxime Plautinis in 1833, about Plautus' comedies. And Antiquitatis Plautinae in 1837, about the antiquities appearing in Plautus' comedies and their relation to his work.In Gallus; or, Roman scenes of the time of Augustus he continued his work in explaining Roman poets, by clarifying archeology and antiquities to understand their work. In his in 1837 published corrections and additions to his father's, Wilhelm Gottlieb Becker's, book Augusteum he demonstrated his sense of importance for correct archeological knowledge.

Becker elaborates on the reason for writing this book in the preface. Those reasons were that the private life of Romans including their customs and manners is an archeological branch that has been neglected. He critiques the absence of work explaining Roman domestic life as a whole instead of loose and unconnected observations. He spent several years collecting knowledge to form this full picture in the form of the story of Gallus. Imitating books by Böttinger and Mazois he chose to produce a continuous story with explanatory notes to convey information. He chose Gallus as the protagonist because he found him and his life remarkable. Cornelius Gallus, a Roman historical figure, was a prominent poet, well-known for his love of elegy. He was also known for his close relationship with Roman figures such as Virgil and Augustus, and his death through suicide after falling in disgrace. Those are elements that can be found throughout the content of the book.

== Contents ==
The book describes Roman customs and culture through the narrative lens of Cornelius Gallus. It is divided into two parts. In the first part 12 scenes build a partly fictitious and partly historically accurate story, following the life of Cornelius Gallus. Part two contains excursuses for every scene (except for scenes six and eleven) which explain aspects of Roman domestic life portrayed in that scene.

The first scene is about Gallus' family. Its excursus characterises the structure of a customary Roman family. The second scene is about Gallus' house. Its excursus describes the Roman house including its structure, household utensils, and clocks. The third scene is about studies and letters. Its excursus is about Roman libraries, books, booksellers, and letters. The fourth is about Gallus' journey from his house to his villa. Its excursus is about the carriages and the Inns. The fifth scene is about Gallus' villa and estate. Its excursus is about the gardens. The sixth scene is about Lycoris and it does not have an excursus. Scene seven describes a day in a bathing place in Italy. Its excursus is about Roman baths and gymnastics. Scene eight is about how Gallus fell in Augustus' disgrace. Its excursus is about the dresses of men and women. The ninth scene is about a banquet. Its excursus describes a typical Roman meal. The tenth scene is about the drinkers. Its excursus describes the chaplets and social games. The eleventh scene is about the consequences of falling in disgrace for Gallus and his suicide. This scene does not have an excursus. The twelfth scene is about the information of Gallus' death reaching Augustus. Its excursus is about the Roman burial of the dead.

== Reception ==
In Germany, the book was received greatly and used as a handbook for Roman domestic life. In 1849 Becker published a second edition of the book containing minor corrections. After the publication the book Becker worked on his lifetime work. It was supposed to be a systematic work about all Roman antiquities for which he lived in Rome for three months. It remained unfinished before his death.

This version of the book is in the English language, translated by Frederick Metcalfe. After the publication of the German version by Becker a London Times article was published about it. In this critique the book was highly praised by English scholars and a proposal to translate it into English was made. Metcalfe himself decided to translate the book because he was intrigued by the novelty of its concept, and found Gallus to be a remarkable person of antiquity. He wanted English students to be able to read it and stimulate them into further investigation of Roman domestic life. In a review of the North American Review, Metcalfe's translation is criticised for deficiencies in facts, illustrations, and missing points of disquisition. The reviewer notes that they discovered in the translator's prefaces that these deficiencies may be addressed in Becker's original version.
