= Forum Iulii =

Forum Iulii, Latin meaning 'marketplace of Julius', or Forum Julii in modernized spelling, can refer in Latin to the following cities:

- Fréjus in France
- Cividale del Friuli in Italy
- Voghera in Italy

== See also ==
- Battle of Forum Julii, 69 AD
- Forum Julium (disambiguation)
