= Élie Brun =

French politician

Mayor of Fréjus
- In office 1997–2014
- Preceded by: François Léotard
- Succeeded by: David Rachline

Member of the French Senate for Var
- In office 2008–2010
- Preceded by: Hubert Falco
- Succeeded by: Hubert Falco

Personal details
- Born: 15 October 1948 (age 77) Périgueux, France
- Party: UMP

Élie Brun (born 15 October 1948 in Périgueux) is a former member of the Senate of France, who represented the Var department from 2008 to 2010. He is a member of the Union for a Popular Movement.
