= Malpasset Dam =

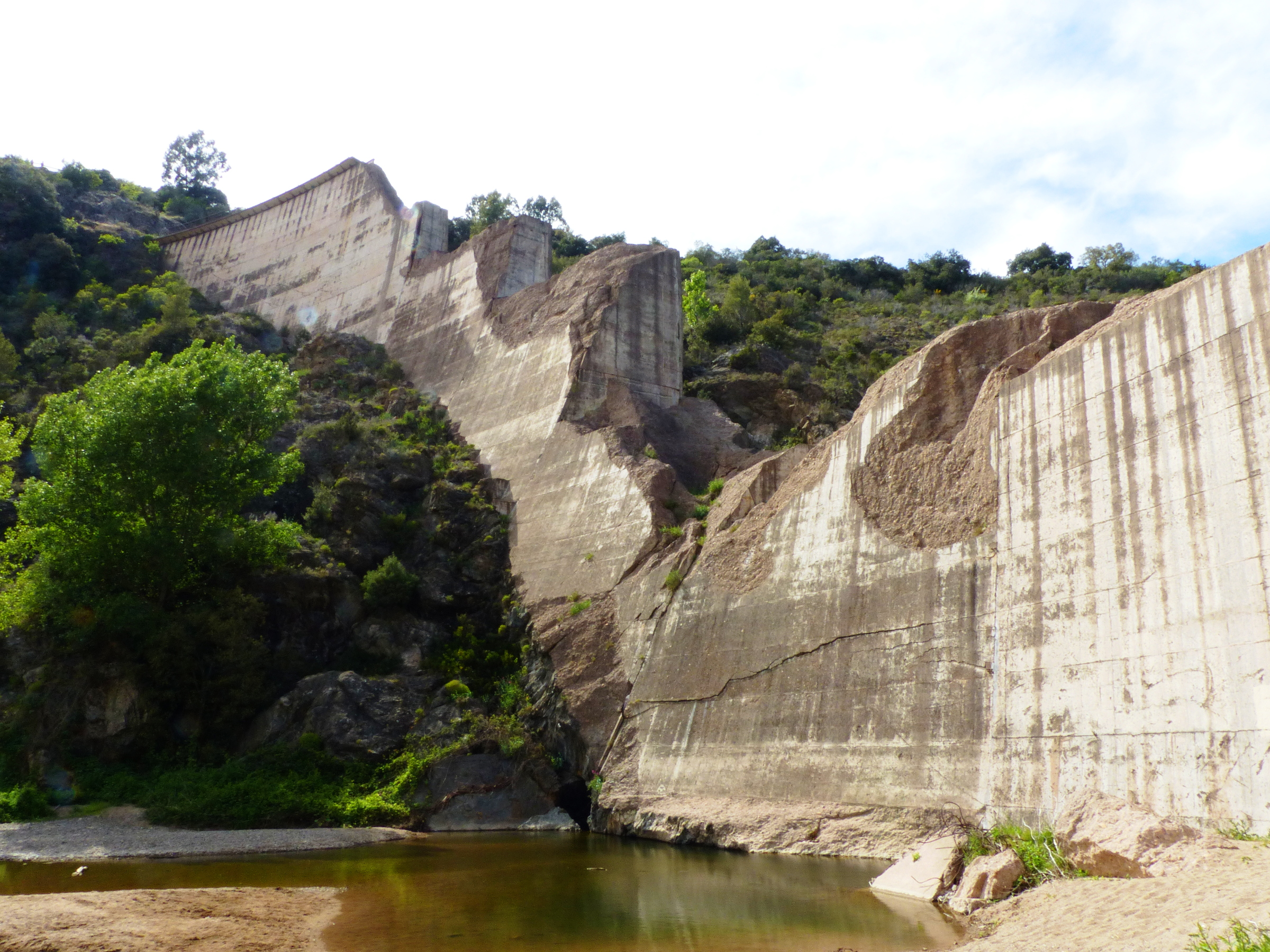
- The ruins of the dam 2014

- Location within France
- Official name: French: Barrage de Malpasset
- Location: France
- Coordinates: 43°30′43.48″N 6°45′23.40″E
- Construction began: April 1952
- Opening date: 1954
- Demolition date: 2 December 1959
- Construction cost: 580 million francs (by 1955 prices)
- Designed by: André Coyne
- Owner: Département Var (59)

Dam and spillways
- Type of dam: arch dam
- Impounds: Reyran River
- Height: 66 metres (72 yd)
- Length: 222 metres (243 yd)
- Width (crest): 1.5 metres (1.6 yd)
- Width (base): 6.78 metres (7.41 yd)

Reservoir
- Total capacity: 50 million cubic metres (65×10^{6} cu yd)
- Website https://frejus-tourist-office.com/discover/barrage-de-malpasset/

The Malpasset Dam was an arch dam (convex surface facing upstream) on the Reyran River, north of Fréjus on the French Riviera. It collapsed on 2 December 1959, killing 423 people in the resulting flood. The breach was caused by a tectonic fault in the impermeable rock base, which had been inadequately surveyed. Nearby road-building works, using explosives, may also have contributed to the disaster.

== Construction ==
The structure was a doubly curved, equal-angle, arch-type dam with variable radius. It was built to supply drinking and irrigation water for the region. Construction began in April 1952 and was finished in 1954. Another source reported that construction began as early as 1941. Delays due to lack of funding and labor strikes interrupted construction a few times. The project was led by well-known French engineer André Coyne. Construction cost 580 million francs (by 1955 prices), and was funded and owned by Var département. Concurrent with the dam construction, the A8 autoroute was also being built 1,400 m (1,500 yd; 0.76 nmi) further down the course of the Reyran from the dam location.

The dam was supposed to regulate the rate-of-flow of the river that it was near and to store 50 million cubic metres of water for agricultural and domestic use and for the tourism sector of the area. The dam was 222 m (728 ft) in width and 66 m (217 ft) high, and had a thickness of 6.78 m (22.2 ft) at the base and 1.5 m (4 ft 11 in) at the rim.

== Disaster ==
Malpasset Dam Breach
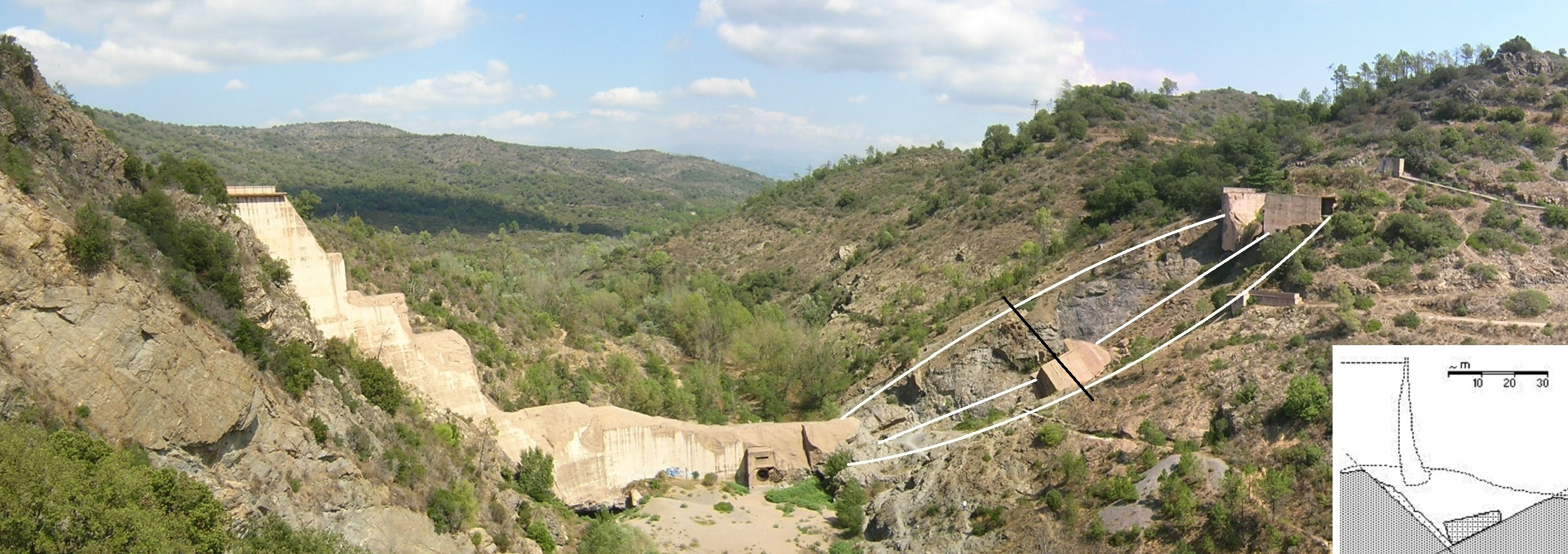
- The breached Malpasset Dam
- Native name: French: Rupture du Barrage de Malpasset
- Date: December 2, 1959
- Time: 21:13 (CET)
- Location: 43°30′43.48″N 6°45′23.40″E
- Type: Dam failure
- Cause: Excess water level due to heavy rainfall
- Deaths: 423
- Injuries: 83
- Property damage: 425 million euros of 2010
- Website: Archived 2017-09-24 at the Wayback Machine

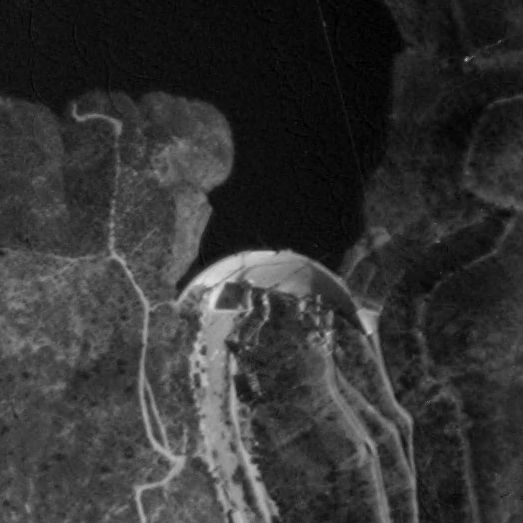
Aerial photograph of the Malpasset dam in 1955

Signs of an imminent collapse began in November 1959; a "trickle of clear water [was] observed high on the right [side]" and then cracks were noticed later in the month in the concrete apron at the dam toe.

The dam was breached at 21:13 on 2 December 1959. The break was partially due to rainfall and thus the rising level of water; by noon on 2 December, the reservoir had reached its maximum level. The guardian André Ferro asked for permission to release the excess water and was denied the ability to do so until 18:00 of that day. By then, the amount of water was so high that it took three hours to release only a few centimetres of water. The entire wall then collapsed with only a few blocks remaining on the right bank. Pieces of the dam are still scattered throughout the area.

The breach created a massive dam-break wave, or wall of water, 40 m (44 yd; 130 ft) high and moving at 70 km/h (38 kn; 43 mph), destroying two small villages, Malpasset and Bozon, the highway construction site, and in 20 minutes, still standing 3 m (3.3 yd; 9.8 ft) high, reaching Fréjus. The water was recorded traveling at speeds up to 70 km/h (38 kn; 43 mph) with large chunks of the concrete wall some weighing up to 600 tonnes (590 long tons; 660 short tons). Various small roads and railroad tracks were also destroyed, with water flooding the western half of Fréjus and finally reaching the sea.

The death toll of the dam breach was reported as 423, with 135 children under the age of 15, 15 minors between 15 and 21 years old, 134 men, 112 women, and 27 individuals who were never identified. Additionally, 79 children were orphaned and 83 people were injured. Other damage included 155 buildings destroyed, 796 buildings damaged, and 1,350 hectares (3,300 acres) destroyed, the amount of destruction totaling about 425 million euros in 2010 terms. The damage amounted to an equivalent total of US$68 million. The event also ushered in the practice of posthumous marriage in France for civilians, as many women who lost their fiancés were granted the right to marry them after death.

Some 1959 postage stamps had a flood surcharge imprinted on them, to raise money for flood victims.

== Cause ==
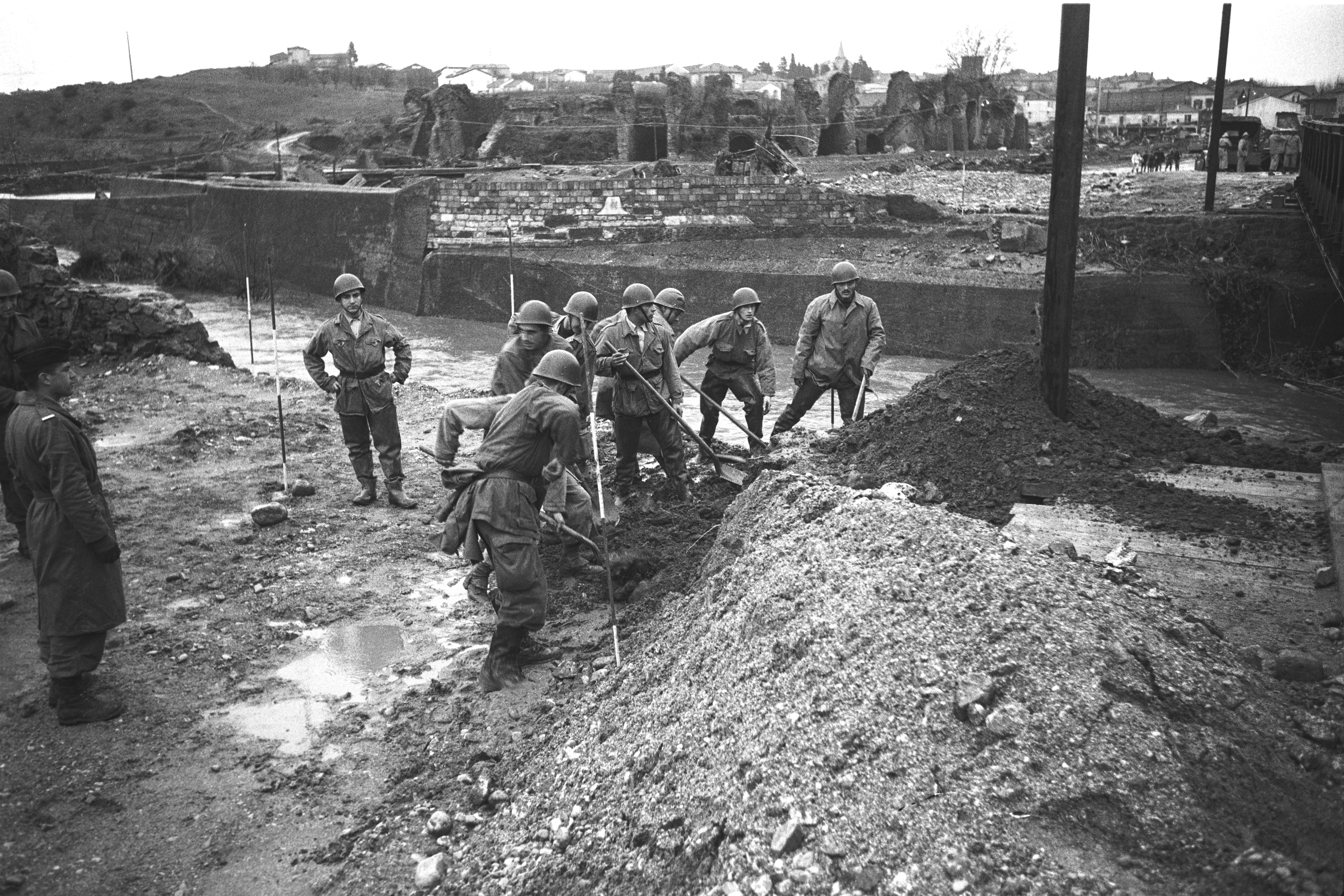
Works after the collapse 1959

Geological and hydrological studies were conducted in 1946 and the dam location was considered suitable. Due to lack of proper funding, however, the geological study of the region was not thorough. The lithology underlying the dam is a metamorphic rock called gneiss. This rock type is known to be relatively impermeable, meaning that no significant groundwater flow occurs within the rock unit, and it does not allow water to penetrate the ground. The right side (looking down the river) was also rock, and a concrete wing wall was constructed to connect the wall to the ground.

A tectonic fault was later found as the most likely cause of the disaster. Other factors contributed, as well; the water pressure was aimed diagonally towards the dam wall, and was not found initially. As a consequence, water collected under a wall and was unable to escape through the ground due to the impermeability of the gneiss rock underneath the dam. Finally, another theory quotes a source stating that explosions during building of the highway might have caused shifting of the rock base of the dam. Weeks before the breach, some cracking noises were heard, but they were not examined. When the cracking noises started is unclear. The right side of the dam had some leaks in November 1959.

Between 19 November and 2 December, 50 cm (20 in) of rain fell, with 13 cm (5.1 in) in 24 hours before the breach. The water level in the dam was only 28 cm (11 in) away from the edge. Rain continued, and the dam guardian wanted to open the discharge valves, but the authorities refused, claiming the highway construction site was in danger of flooding. Five hours before the breach, at 18:00 hours, the water release valves were opened, but with a discharge rate of 40 m^{3}/s, it was not enough to empty the reservoir in time.

Until the Malpasset incident, only three other incidents of arch-type dam breaches were recorded:

- Moyie Dam (the Eileen Dam), Moyie Springs, Idaho, 1925, at 48.77550°N 116.15514°W
- Lake Lanier Dam, South Carolina, 1926 at 35.196710°N 82.234865°W
- Purisima Dam, California, 1930

== See also ==
- Vega de Tera disaster – a dam failure in Spain that same year
- List of natural disasters by death toll – floods and landslides
- List of hydroelectric power station failures
- Vajont Dam
- St. Francis Dam
