= Patrick Salameh =

French criminal and serial killer

- Born: 21 April 1957 (age 69); Fréjus, France
- Other name: "The Marseille Ripper"
- Conviction: Murder x4
- Penalty: Life imprisonment x4 22 years preventive detention

Details
- Victims: 4
- Span of crimes: May – November 2008
- Country: France
- State: Var
- Date apprehended: 1 November 2008

Patrick Salameh (born 21 April 1957), known as The Marseille Ripper, is a French criminal and serial killer.

Between May and November 2008, in Marseille, several women disappeared. Through investigation, Patrick Salameh was found to be involved in these disappearances. He was sentenced in April 2014, October 2015, and May 2016 (on appeal), to life imprisonment, with a safety period of 22 years for kidnapping, forcible confinement, and rape resulting in death.

== Biography ==
=== Origin ===
Patrick Salameh was born on 21 April 1957, in Fréjus in the Var. He comes from a large family of Syrian-Lebanese origin, made up of 9 brothers and sisters. When Patrick was a child, the Salamehs moved to the Marseille region.

In the early 1980s, when he was 25 years old, Salameh became manager of a restaurant, the "Rock Opéra Burger", located in the heart of the districts of Marseille.

In 1983, Patrick Salameh married and became the father of two children. In 1988, however, Salameh saw his income suddenly fall and his restaurant went bankrupt.

=== Series of armed attacks ===
Between September 1988 and February 1989, Patrick Salameh and a group of friends carried out numerous burglaries and robberies. They were rampant in the Var region. They broke into private homes to commit assault and robbery. They were briefly nicknamed "The Wild Horde" in the press and in the media. During the robberies of the gang, Patrick Salameh is nicknamed "Antoine". This series of armed robberies was made up of five heists, two of which were made up of aggravated violence:

- On 9 December 1988, during the third armed attack committed by "The Wild Horde", the husband was severely beaten while his wife suffered physical abuse imposed by Patrick Salameh by his associates.
- On 28 February 1989, during the fifth and last gang robbery, Patrick Salameh and his associates sequester a close relative of the Zampa family, a former figure in the Marseilles environment, and steal a large sum of money from him.

=== Arrest, preventive detention and escape attempts ===
At the beginning of March 1989, Patrick Salameh and his associates were arrested and imprisoned in the Baumettes prison.

During the night of 26 to 27 July 1990, Patrick Salameh tries to escape from prison, by giving sleeping pills to his fellow prisoner. Then, he bribes a guard with 15,000 francs. Salameh then tries to climb the perimeter wall with a mountaineer's rope, 26 metres long and weighted with a bag of putty. Startled, he fell and broke his leg. Salameh was then transferred to Conception Hospital and recovered from his injuries.

In November 1990, while Patrick Salameh began a second escape attempt from the Baumettes prison, a search in his room at the hospital centre led to the discovery of a file hidden in a rod and a woven sheet of 2, 50 m. The preventive detention of Patrick Salameh and his associates lasted for four years.

Trial, conviction, detention and release

On 10 May 1993, the trial of "La Horde Sauvage" began before the Draguignan Assize Court. 36-year-old Patrick Salameh appears accompanied by his three companions. At the end of a week of trial, the jurors deliberate for four hours to determine the sentences of the four accused. During requisitions, the Advocate General requires 20 years of criminal imprisonment against Patrick Salameh.

On 15 May 1993, Patrick Salameh was sentenced to 20 years' imprisonment for armed robbery, forcible confinement, torture and indecent assault. Released in March 1999, his first requests for release were refused between 1999 and 2004.

In July 2005, Patrick Salameh was released from prison after more than 16 years of detention.

== Summary of serial killings ==
=== Victims ===
In 2008, in the span of a little more than a month, three prostitutes mysteriously disappeared in Marseille. They were the following:

- Iryna Sytnyk (42) - Ukrainian. Disappeared on the evening of 5 October 2008.
- Cristina Bahulea (23) - Romanian. Disappeared two weeks after Sytnyk, on 22 October 2008.
- Zineb Chebout (28) - Algerian. Left her house to visit a fair on the evening of 7 November 2008, but never returned.

=== The key witness ===
The investigators suspected early on that a serial killer was rampant in Marseille, as he kidnapped and killed victims fitting the same profile - foreign prostitutes.

However, a revelation soon disrupted the course of the investigation. A Moroccan prostitute, Soumia El Kandadi, named a man whom she suspected could be responsible for the killings - Patrick Salameh, who on the night of 5–6 October, abducted and raped her in his home. When he finished with her, El Kandadi noticed that a lifeless body lay in her attacker's bathtub, with Salameh informing her that "this is the fate [he reserves] for women who don't obey [him]."

Soumia's statements put investigators on the trail for Salameh. Soon after, another clue reinforced their suspicions. The telephone of one of the prostitutes continued to transmit a signal after her disappearance. The police located the signal's source in Marseille: it was a child, which claimed to have been given a SIM card by Patrick Salameh.

Patrick Salameh took his victims' SIM cards and later gave them away, a technique which made the police believe that the missing were still alive since their telephone numbers continued to emit a localizable signal.

=== The search ===
The investigators, in an attempt to locate the bodies, searched Salameh's residency in Saint-Mitre, in Marseille's northern districts. They were aided by Soumia, who guided them to the place where she had seen the corpse of a woman, leading them to Salameh's studio apartment adjacent to his main home. Although investigators couldn't find any bodies, they found DNA from all three missing women, as well as some of their personal possessions such as jewellery and underwear. Prostitutes often frequented the apartment, but no traces of blood were discovered.

During the pre-trial hearings, Salameh denied killing the prostitutes and remained silent. The bodies were never recovered.

=== Link to previous case ===
The investigators, who wondered if there were other possible victims, expanded their search for any women fitting their criteria. Eventually, they linked Salameh to the disappearance of 20-year-old Fatima Saiah, a student who had vanished a few months earlier from the main murder series. Unlike the victims that followed, she was not a prostitute.

Saiah had published an offer online as a babysitter, and was later contacted by a divorced man on Saturday afternoon, 7 May. The two met at 3 PM, at the Malpassé Metro. The man refused to tell his name, but specified that his wife would pick Saiah up in a grey Volkswagen at the metro's exit, which was not far from Salameh's studio apartment.

Initially, Saiah's boyfriend accompanied her to the scene, but later left shortly before she met with the man, agreeing to message each other in a few hours. Two hours later, he received a strange text message saying "I met an old friend, I will be back this weekend." Finding this suspicious, the boyfriend started worrying and tried to contact Saiah, but failed, as her phone had been turned off. The next day, both Saiah's family and boyfriend went to the police station to report her disappearance.

The investigators later traced the phone call Saiah had received for the babysitting offer. It had been made from a telephone booth at Gare de Marseille-Saint-Charles, but that was the only lead they had in the case. A homeless person who was questioned during the investigation later recalled that on that day, he recognized the man using the phone booth as Patrick Salameh.

=== Arrest ===
On the evening of 15 November 2008, investigators arrested Patrick Salameh. He then returned to prison, for the murders of three prostitutes, although little evidence existed to establish the certainty of his guilt.

On 11 March 2009, a reconstruction took place, but Patrick Salameh, denying the facts with which he is accused, refused to collaborate. Following this unsuccessful reenactment, Salameh returned to prison.

On 6 May 2011, Patrick Salameh, already charged with the three murders of prostitutes, was again indicted for the alleged murder of Fatima Saiah, whose body was also not found.

On 12 October 2012, Patrick Salameh was referred to the Aix-en-Provence Assize Court for the murders of Iryna Sytnyk, Cristina Bahulea and Zineb Chebout (perpetrated between October and November 2008). He was also the subject of a referral to the Assize Court of Bouches-du-Rhône, for the murder of Fatima Saiah, three weeks before his first trial, on 24 February 2014.

=== The trial ===
Patrick Salameh's first trial began on 17 March 2014, at the Aix-en-Provence Assize Court.

On 3 April 2014, Patrick Salameh was sentenced to life imprisonment, with a safety period of 22 years. He was found guilty of kidnapping, kidnapping, and rape followed by death on the person of Iryna Sytnyk, Cristina Bahulea and Zineb Chebout. He was also on trial for the kidnapping and rape of Soumia El Kandadi, the main witness whose testimony led to his arrest. In 2016 he appealed this decision.

On 12 October 2015, his second trial began, before the Assize Court of Bouches-du-Rhône. Patrick Salameh was on trial for the kidnapping followed by the death of Fatima Saiah, a young high school student, whose body has never been found.

On 22 October 2015, Patrick Salameh was also sentenced to life imprisonment, with a safety period of 22 years. He also appealed this decision. The two trials of Salameh being extremely close, the appeal of the two convictions were combined, in a single trial.

On 18 April 2016, Patrick Salameh was tried on appeal, before the Var Assize Court. He was 59 years old at the time. Incarcerated for 7 years and 5 months, Patrick Salameh still denied the four assassinations with which he is accused, whose bodies have never been found. Here again, Salameh was described as "dangerous" and "difficult to cure", with a very high risk of recurrence.

On 19 May 2016, Patrick Salameh was again convicted of the murders of Fatima Saiah, Iryna Sytnyk, Cristina Bahulea and Zineb Chebout (whose bodies were not found) as well as of the rape of Soumia (the five acts having been committed between May and November 2008). Following the deliberations, Salameh was again sentenced to life imprisonment, with a 22-year safety period.

Partick Salameh and his lawyers appealed on points of law, but the appeal was dismissed on 11 July 2017.

== See also ==
- List of serial killers by country
