= Maximianus (poet) =

Roman poet

Maximianus or Maximian (sometimes referred to as Maximianus Etruscus) was a Latin elegiac poet of the sixth century AD, who has been called "in some sort, the last of the Roman poets".

== Life ==
Nothing is known of Maximianus's life save what can be inferred from his poetry. In it, he claims Etruscan descent (me ... Etruscae gentis alumnum [5.5]); describes his youth and manhood, including his friendship with Boethius, whom he apostrophizes as the "greatest investigator of great matters" (magnarum scrutator maxime rerum [3.47])—leading most scholars to date his work roughly to the middle of the sixth century—and says that in his old age he was sent as an ambassador to the emperor's court at Constantinople (5.1–4). Some scholars, however, have maintained that the poetry represents the utterances of one or more personae and that nothing therein, including the name Maximianus, is to be taken as reliable information about the poet. The name "Maximianus" could thus be understood as a speaking pseudonym, literally meaning "descendant of the greatest".

== Poetry ==
Maximianus's poetry, usually divided into six separate elegies, deals with the contrast between the infirmities of age and the vigor and amours of youth. Some scholars have noted a connection with the topos of the senex amans found in classical comedy and in Ovid.

The first, and longest, elegy presents in detail the miseries of the "prison", the "living death", that is old age. The second tells of the poet's long love for Lycoris, who abandoned him as he began to grow old; the third and fourth, of his youthful passions for Aquilina and Candida. The fifth recounts his abortive tryst with a Greek girl during his embassy in the East, along with her reaction to his impotence. (When she begins to weep and he apologizes for his erotic failure, she sobs, "It is not that! It is the general chaos of the world.") The sixth, consisting of only twelve lines, again expresses the horror of approaching death. Throughout, "the imminence of death and the sadness of growing old are seen as representing the end of pagan culture and its joy in living".

== Reception ==
Despite its erotic content, Maximianus's verse was part of the corpus of texts used in the 11th and 12th centuries to teach schoolboys the rudiments of Latin (perhaps because he discouraged the foolish desire for long life), though its use for this purpose was criticized by Alexander of Villedieu:

quamvis haec non sit doctrina satis generalis,
proderit ipsa tamen plus nugis Maximiani.

(Although this [that is, Alexander's] instruction is not wholly sufficient,
it is more profitable than the trifles of Maximianus.)

Perhaps because of this use of the poetry in elementary education, echoes of and references to it are found in a wide variety of medieval writers, including Hugh of Saint Victor, Giraldus Cambrensis, Geoffrey of Vinsauf, Nigel Wireker, Alain de Lille, and Walter of Châtillon. A Middle English poem entitled "Le Regret de Maximian" was based on Maximianus's first elegy, and Chaucer's use of the Latin poet's work has been investigated by various scholars. Later, Montaigne would quote the first elegy several times in his last essay, "On Experience".

Although one or more printed editions of the work had appeared in the 15th century, it was the 1501 edition by the Neapolitan teenager Pomponius Gauricus that attracted the most attention among Renaissance scholars. Gauricus, suppressing the distich in which the name Maximianus appears and altering the reference to Boethius, published the verse as the work of the first-century-BC poet Cornelius Gallus, whose elegies had been thought to be entirely lost. This enthusiastic error (or deliberate fraud) caused Maximianus's poetry to be widely misattributed to Gallus for hundreds of years. Gauricus also appears to be responsible for the division of the verse, which in almost all the manuscripts appears as a continuous poem, into six elegies—a division that has been followed by subsequent editors.

The first published English translation, by Hovenden Walker, was titled The Impotent Lover: Accurately Described in Six Elegies upon Old Age, with the Old Doting Letcher's Resentments on the Past Pleasures and Vigorous Performances of Youth. A full English translation with commentary was published by the American poet A. M. Juster in 2018.

== Editions ==
- Maximiani Elegiae, ed. E. Baehrens, Poetae Latini Minores V (Leipzig, 1883)
- Massimiano: Elegie, ed. Tullio Agozzino, Biblioteca Silva di Filologia (Bologna: Silva, 1970)
- Versus Maximiani: Der Elegienzyklus textkritisch herausgegeben, übersetzt und neu interpretiert, ed. and trans. (into German) Christina Sandquist Öberg, Acta Universitatis Stockholmiensis: Studia Latina Stockholmiensia, vol. 43. (Stockholm: Almqvist & Wiksell International, 1999) ISBN 91-22-01824-7
- The Elegies of Maximianus, ed. and trans. A. M. Juster (Philadelphia: U of Pennsylvania P, 2018) ISBN 978-0-8122-4979-8

== Sources ==
- Schneider, Wolfgang Christian (2003). Die elegischen Verse von Maximian: Eine letzte Widerrede gegen die neue christliche Zeit. Palingenesia (in German). Vol. 79. Stuttgart: Franz Steiner. ISBN 3-515-07926-2.
- Stroh, Wilfried (1999). "Maximianus 4". In Cancik, Hubert; Schneider, Helmuth (eds.). Der Neue Pauly. Vol. 7. Stuttgart: Metzler. pp. 1070–1071. ISBN 3-476-01477-0.
