= Hôtel de Ville, Fréjus =

Town hall in Fréjus, France

Hôtel de Ville
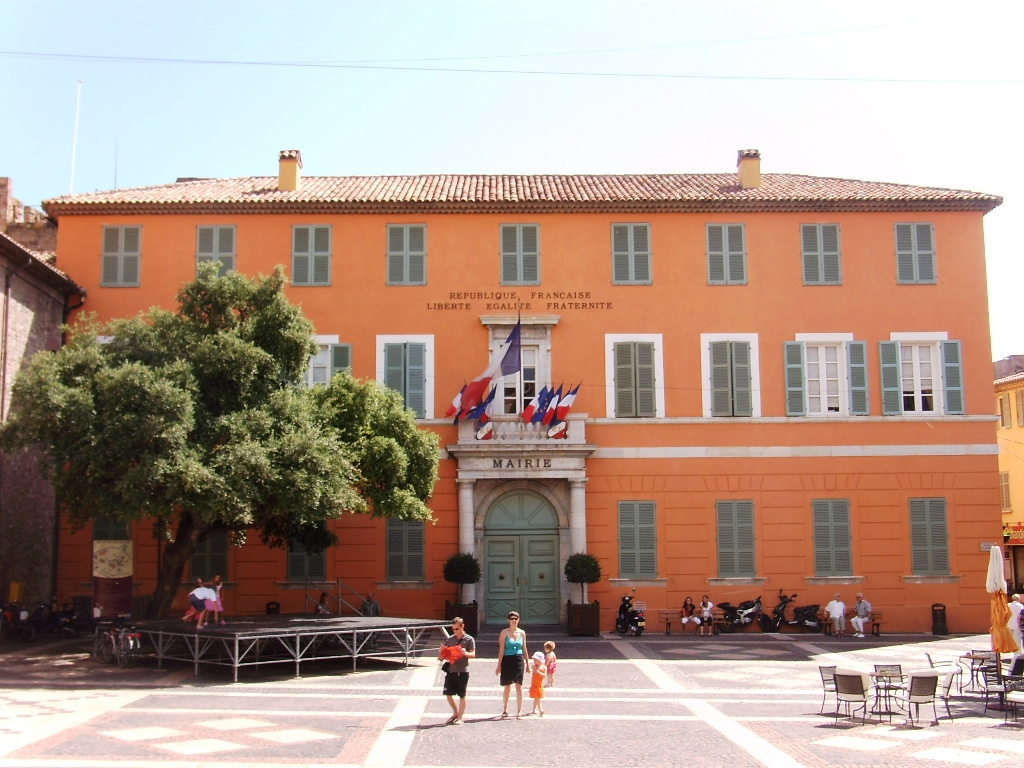
- The main frontage of the Hôtel de Ville in August 2008
- Interactive map of the Hôtel de Ville area

General information
- Type: City hall
- Architectural style: Neoclassical style
- Location: Fréjus, France
- Coordinates: 43.4330°N 6.7370°E
- Completed: 1825

Design and construction
- Architect: Esprit Lantoin

The Hôtel de Ville (French pronunciation: [otɛl də vil], City Hall) is a municipal building in Fréjus, Var, southeast France, standing on Place Formigé. It has been included on the Inventaire général des monuments by the French Ministry of Culture since 1983.

== History ==
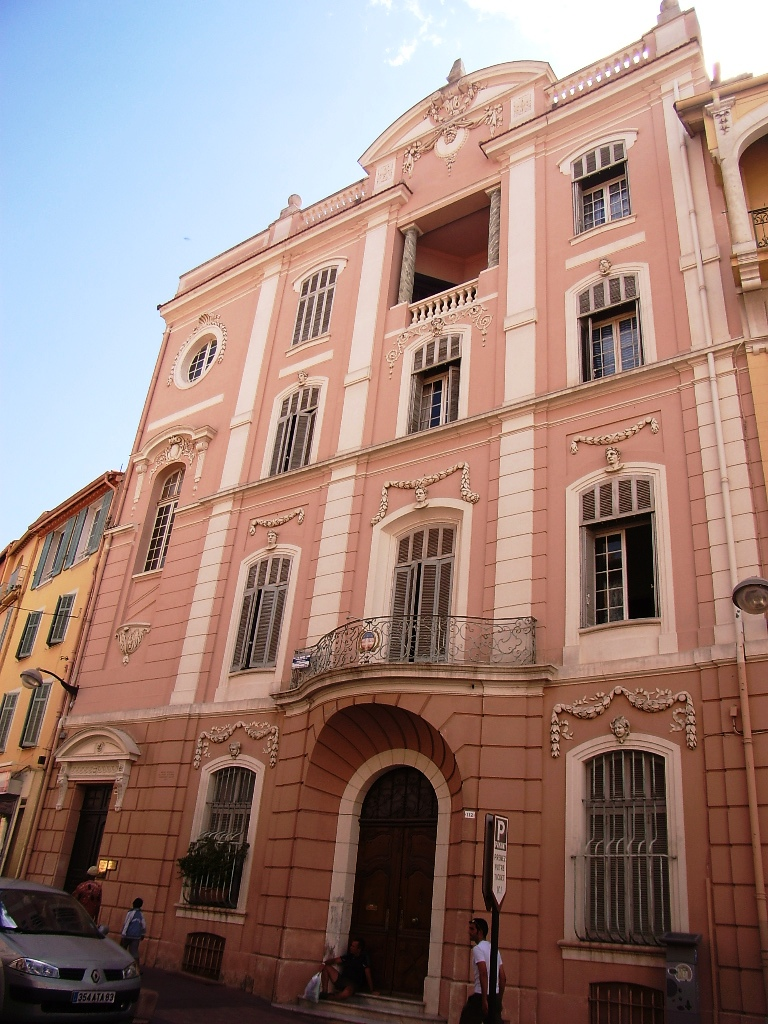
The old town hall on Rue Nationale (now Rue Jean Jaurès)

The building was commissioned as part of the bishop's palace, which dated back to the 5th century and was built just to the south of Fréjus Cathedral, which also dated back to that time. Rebuilt in the 11th century, the bishop's palace was originally quite a small structure, 6.5 metres (21 ft) by 5 metres (16 ft), and three storeys high, with a vaulted hall on the second floor and a terrace on the roof with a crenelated wall for defence. It was expanded with the Chapelle Saint-André (Saint-André Chapel) and the Tour du Belvédère (Beledere Tower) built at the southeast corner of the site in the 13th century, and a kitchen and stable block built in the 14th century. Much of the original structure was destroyed when the western part of the complex was remodelled in the Renaissance style in the 16th century.

The palace became dilapidated in the 18th century and, during the French Revolution, it was seized by the state but then remained vacant for two decades. In around 1818, it was returned to the church and the new bishop, Charles-Alexandre de Richery, decided to demolish the western part of the structure, and to erect a new building in its place.

The new structure was designed by the architect of the department, Esprit Lantoin, in the neoclassical style, built in brick with a cement render finish and was completed in 1825. The design involved a symmetrical main frontage of nine bays facing west onto the central square (now the Place Formigé). The ground floor was rusticated. The central bay contained a round headed doorway with a porch formed by a pair of Doric order columns supporting an entablature. The other bays on the ground floor and all the bays on the first and second floors were fenestrated with casement windows with shutters.

In 1906, the Bishop of Fréjus, Félix-Adolphe-Camille-Jean-Baptiste Guillibert, was expelled from the palace, following the implementation of the 1905 French law on the Separation of the Churches and the State. The town council, which had previously been based on Rue Nationale (now Rue Jean Jaurès), (Note: The consuls (councillors) were originally accommodated at a building on Place du Bourguet dating from 1556. After that building became dilapidated, the council commissioned a purpose-built town hall on a site in Rue Nationale (now Rue Jean Jaurès). It was designed in the Louis XV style, built with Marseille stone and was officially opened on 31 January 1768. The building, which featured a distinctive convex door frame, was extended after adjacent properties were demolished in 1870. It is now a private house owned by an architect.) was looking for extra space and decided to acquire the former bishop's palace and relocated there in 1912.

The council re-organised the complex so that the Salle du Conseil (council chamber) and public rooms were in the 1825 building, and the library and archives were in the Saint-André Chapel and Tour du Belvédère behind. The eastern part of the building was completely restored to a design by Jules Formigé in 1921.
