= Forum Julium =

Forum Julium may refer to the following Ancient Roman places:

- the Forum of Caesar, a major square in Rome
- the settlement Illiturgis, in southern Iberia (Spain)

== See also ==
- Forum Iulii (disambiguation)
