= Reyran =

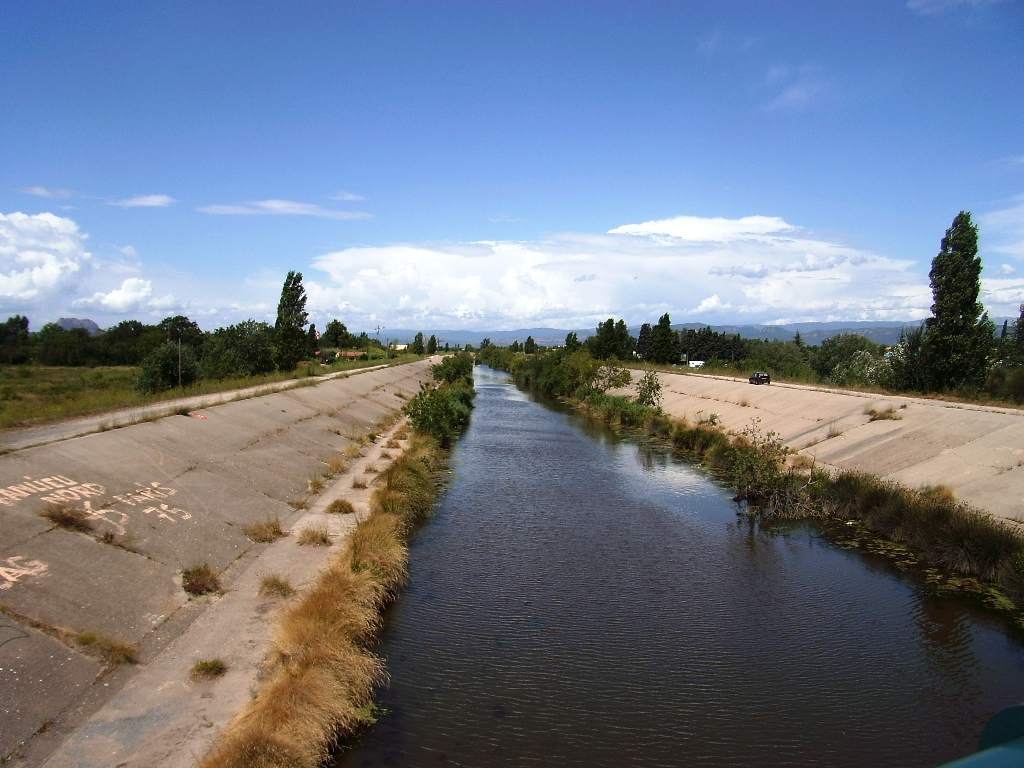
- The Reyran in Fréjus

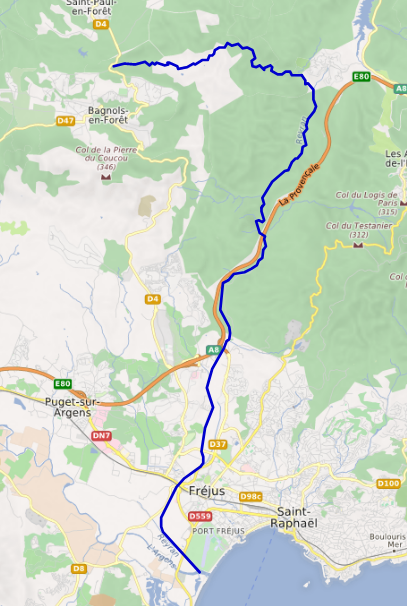

Location
- Country: France

Physical characteristics
- Source
  - location: Bagnols-en-Forêt, Var
  - coordinates: 43.5506°N 6.6986°E
- Mouth
  - location: Argens
  - coordinates: 43.4105°N 6.7338°E
- Length: 26.8 km (16.7 mi)

Basin features
- Progression: Argens→ Mediterranean Sea

The Reyran is a torrent in the Var department in Provence-Alpes-Côte d'Azur, France and a tributary of the Argens. This ephemeral stream is 26.8 km long, originating in Bagnols-en-Forêt in the Var, 12 km from Fréjus.

The Reyran flows for approximately three months of the year and can be dry the rest of the time, with a very irregular flow. The annual rate is 22.70 million but can reach as low as 15.75 million once every 30 years. The flow rate is highest during the months of December, January, and April, and sometimes zero during July and August. During the summer months, the riverbed may present a series of isolated ponds that decrease in size daily. The bed of the Reyran consists of coarse sand and gravel up to 30–40 cm, with a lithology of surrounding rocks including sandstone, gneiss, pegmatite, and volcanic rocks.

== Fréjus ==
The Reyran is piped through the city of Fréjus via a concrete canal built after the Malpasset Dam failure. These measures were implemented by the city as preventive flood control. The Reyran does not cause flood plains like the Argens, but rather exceptional torrential floods and urban run-offs, such as the Garonne and Valescure in the neighboring town of Saint-Raphael. A flood of this type occurred in 2012 and destroyed the concrete ford located just downstream from the highway bridge, close to the ancient hamlet of Malpasset devastated in 1959.

The Reyran runs north to south and empties into the Argens at the Naval Air Base of Frejus-Saint Raphael.
