= Fréjus station =

Railway station in Fréjus, France

Coordinates: 43°25′55″N 6°43′58″E

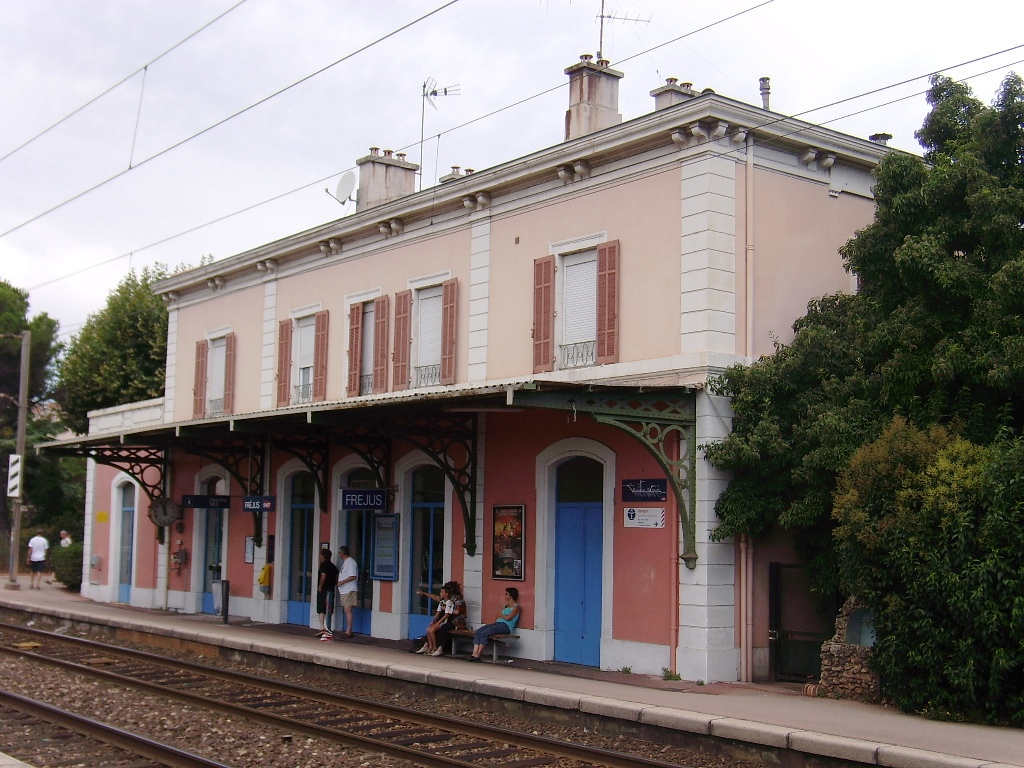
Gare de Fréjus

Gare de Fréjus is a railway station serving Fréjus, Var department, southeastern France. It is situated on the Marseille–Ventimiglia railway. The station is served by regional trains (TER Provence-Alpes-Côte d'Azur) to Nice, Marseille and Toulon.

Preceding station	TER PACA	Following station
Les Arcs–Draguignan Terminus	3	Saint-Raphaël-Valescure towards Nice
Les Arcs–Draguignan towards Marseille	6	Saint-Raphaël-Valescure towards Nice
