= Wilhelm Adolf Becker =

German classical scholar (1796–1846)

Wilhelm Adolf Becker (1796 – 30 September 1846) was a German classical scholar.

== Biography ==
Becker was born in Dresden, the son of German art historian, numismatist and author Wilhelm Gottlieb Becker. At first destined for a commercial life, he was in 1812 sent to the celebrated school at Pforta. In 1816 he entered the University of Leipzig, where he studied under Beck and Hermann. After holding subordinate posts at Zerbst and Meissen, he was in 1842 appointed professor of archaeology at Leipzig. He died at Meissen on 30 September 1846.

== Works ==
The works by which Becker is most widely known are the Gallus, oder, römische Scenen aus der Zeit Augusts: zur genaueren Kenntniss des römischen Privatlebens (1838, new ed. by Hermann Göll, 1880–1882), and the Charicles: Bilder altgriechischer Sitte, zur genaueren Kenntniss des griechischen Privatlebens (1840, new ed. by Göll, 1877–1878). These two books were translated into English by Frederick Metcalfe. They contain a description of the everyday life of the ancient Greeks and Romans, in the form of a romance, with notes and appendices.

A major work is Handbuch der römischen Alterthümer (1843–1868), completed after Becker's death by Marquardt and Mommsen. Becker's other treatises include De Comicis Romanorum Fabulis, a treatise on Roman dramatic poetry (1837); De Romae Veteris Muris atque Portis (1842); Die römische Topographie in Röm (1844); and Zur römischen Topographie (1845).
