= David Rachline =

French politician (born 1987)

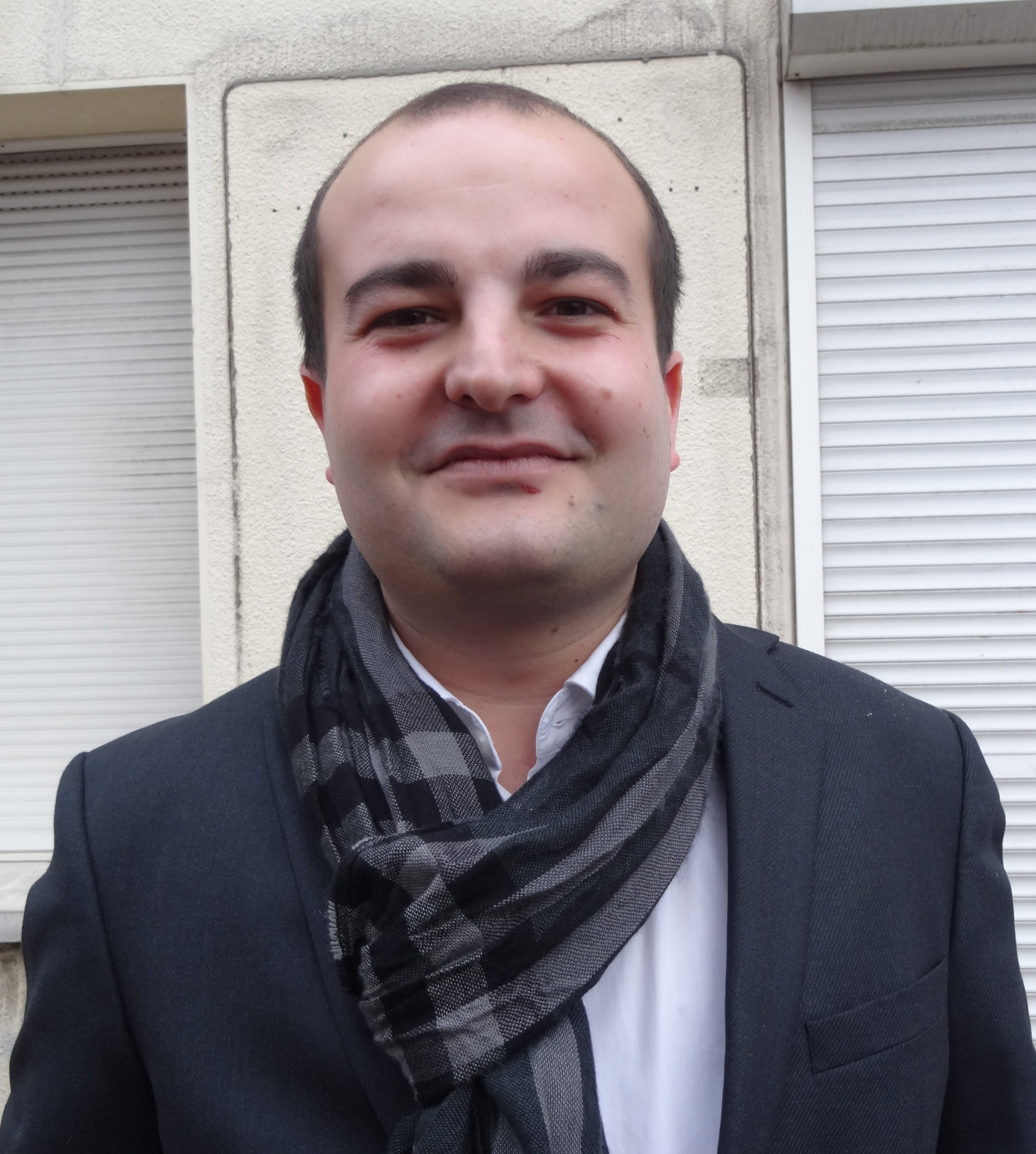

Member of the French Senate for Var
- In office 1 October 2014 – 1 October 2017
- Succeeded by: Claudine Kauffmann

Mayor of Fréjus
- Incumbent
- Assumed office 5 April 2014
- Preceded by: Élie Brun

Personal details
- Born: 2 December 1987 (age 38) Saint-Raphaël, France
- Party: National Rally

David Rachline (born 2 December 1987) is a French politician for National Rally. He was elected mayor of Fréjus in March 2014 and elected to the French Senate in September 2014.

== Early life and education ==
David Rachline was born the son of socialist activist Serge Rachline, whose Jewish grandparents had migrated to France from Ukraine.

David Rachline claims his non-Jewishness, because he was not circumcised, did not to have Bar Mitzvah, and his father was a "non-observant" Jew. He defines himself as agnostic.

Rachline graduated with a baccalaureate in "accounting" and dropped law studies at age 18. to devote himself to the party.

== Political career ==
Rachline has stated that he was interested in political and militant action, before he joined the Front national.

In 2002, he joined the Front national, at the age of 15, "extremely motivated by the arrival of Jean-Marie Le Pen" in the second round of the 2002 French presidential election. In 2006, he became president of the Var section of the "Génération nation" (Front national youth organization), as well as of the "Jeunes avec Le Pen", and went through "Génération Le Pen", the movement of Marine Le Pen. He actively participated in her 2007 presidential campaign with Farid Smahi, he organized the arrival of Jean-Marie Le Pen on the slab of Argenteuil (also known as "Operation Asperge"), where Nicolas Sarkozy had made controversial comments about "Kärcher" and "scum" in 2005. He was also an alternate candidate in the 2007 French parliamentary elections and elected to the FN Central Committee in 2007.

He was affected by Catherine Mégret, then mayor of Vitrolles, Bouches-du-Rhône when she set up a birth allowance in the amount of 5000 Francs (€762) for children of French parents or European Union nationals, a measure which he supported in 2008.

In 2009, he took over the leadership of the National Youth Front and held this post until 2011. In the 2014 French municipal elections, Rachline was elected mayor of Fréjus after having obtained 40.30% of the votes in the first round and 45.55% in the second round.

In the French Senate election in September 2014, he was elected to the Senate, becoming together with Stéphane Ravier the first senators from National Rally (then known as Front National).
