= Battle of Forum Julii =

Battle between the forces of rival Roman emperors Otho and Vitellius (69 AD)

Battle of 'Forum Julii'
Date	69 AD
Location	near Forum Julii, Gallia Narbonensis
Result	Othonian victory

Belligerents
Supporters of Otho	Supporters of Vitellius

Commanders and leaders
Suedius Clemens	Julius Classicus, Fabius Valens (not present at battle)

Strength
Unknown, but significantly larger than the opposition	Approx. 19,000 infantry and 24,000 cavalry

Casualties and losses
Unknown	Exact numbers unknown, but a significant amount of infantry is included

The Battle of Forum Julii was fought between the armies of the rival Roman emperors Otho and Vitellius forces in early 69 AD. It is described by Tacitus in his Histories at 2.14-15. The exact location of this battle is not mentioned by the historian, however, he alludes to its taking place in Gallia Narbonensis, possibly near modern Fréjus.

== Prelude ==
After assuming the imperial throne during the civil war, Otho campaigned to secure the passes in the Alps bordering Gaul, as well as those territories whose loyalties toward him were in doubt. As a part of these campaigns, he sent his fleet to secure Gallia Narbonensis, which had sworn allegiance to Vitellius, Otho's primary opposition, and potential (and later successful) usurper of the throne.

According to Tacitus (Histories 2.14), Fabius Valens, after hearing of the threat to Gallia Narbonensis, responded as follows:

He despatched two cohorts of Tungrian infantry, four squadrons of horse, and all the cavalry of the Treviri under the command of Julius Classicus. Part of these troops were retained for the defence of the colony of Forum Julii, for it was feared, that if the whole [Vitellianist] army were sent by the route through the interior, the [Othonian] fleet might make a rapid movement on the unprotected coast. Twelve squadrons of cavalry and some picked infantry advanced against [Otho's forces]; they [the Vitellianists] were reinforced by a cohort of Ligurians, an auxiliary local force of long standing, and five hundred Pannonians, not yet regularly enrolled.

== Battle ==
The battle was fought on a small plain near the coast, probably near modern-day Menton. The Othonians faced to the west, their right flank anchored by a detachment of marines and local infantry in hills and their left supported by their navy, which probably also held a reserve of Cohortes urbanae; their centre was formed of Praetorian Guard. The Vitellans faced them, with the Ligurian infantry in the hills on their left and the remainder of their infantry (Tungrians) in the centre in close order, behind their large cavalry forces of which the Treveri, considered elite, made up the front rank.

The battle began as soon as the armies met. A rash attack on behalf of the Vitellian auxiliaries led to them being surrounded:

The squadrons of the Treveri charged the enemy incautiously, and found themselves encountered in front by the veteran troops, while on the flanks they were also annoyed by showers of stones from the rustic band, who were skilful throwers, and who, mixed up as they were among the regular soldiers, whether cowardly or brave, were all equally bold in the moment of victory. The general consternation of the Vitellianists was increased by a new alarm as the fleet attacked the rear of the combatants. By this movement they were hemmed in on all sides, and the whole force would have perished, had not the shades of night checked the advance of the victorious army, and covered the retreat of the vanquished.

Despite the loss, the Vitellianist forces, specifically the fierce Tungrian auxiliaries, retaliated against their enemy, who had relaxed in the joy of victory (Histories 2.15):

The Vitellianists, however, though beaten, did not remain inactive. They brought up reinforcements and attacked the enemy, who felt themselves secure, and whose vigilance was relaxed by success. The sentinels were cut down, the camp stormed, and the panic reached the ships, till, as the alarm gradually subsided, they again assumed the offensive under the protection of some neighbouring heights which they had occupied. A terrible slaughter ensued, and the prefects of the Tungrian cohorts, after having long maintained their line unbroken, fell beneath a shower of missiles. The Othonianists, however, did not achieve a bloodless victory, as the enemy's cavalry wheeled round, and cut off some who had imprudently prolonged the pursuit.

== Aftermath ==
The Vitellianists retreated to Antipolis, a town of Gallia Narbonensis, the Othonianists to Albigaunum, in Upper Liguria, who subsequently blockaded the province from unfriendly forces.

When Fabius Valens heard of the loss, he sent a detachment of Batavian auxiliaries to the relief of the province. Tacitus makes a note of this action (Histories 2.28) with an anecdote on the well-known strength of the Batavians, and the subsequent risings of a mutiny on behalf of the Vitellianist legions. Due to the feeling of fear/loss that the legions had when these brave compatriots of theirs were sent away for the aforementioned mission, Valens was forced to deal with said brief mutiny of his troops.
