= Wilhelm Gottlieb Becker =

German art historian and numismatist (1753–1813)

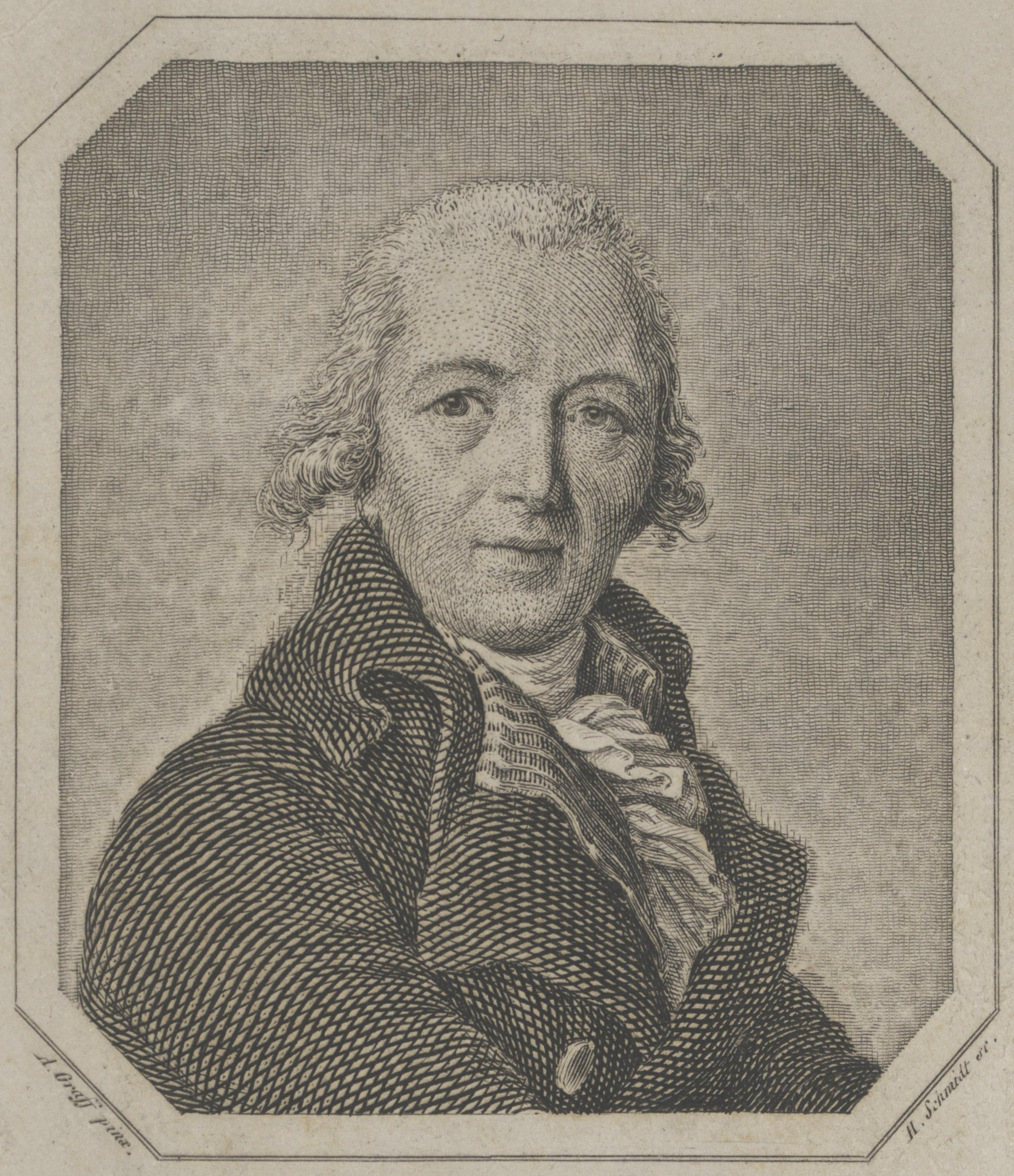
Wilhelm Gottlieb Becker

Wilhelm Gottlieb Becker (4 November 1753, in Oberkallenberg in Saxony – 3 June 1813, in Dresden) was a German art historian, numismatist, and author.

== Biography ==
He received an early education in Gera, then studied law at Leipzig (1773–76). Following graduation, he taught classes at the Philanthropinum in Dessau, and for several years traveled abroad, during which time, he visited Strasbourg, Basel, and Zurich (1778–82). He became a professor at the Ritterakademie in Dresden in 1782. In 1795 he was appointed director of the Dresden Gallery of Antiques, and of the Coin Cabinet, and in 1805 he was also entrusted with the directorship of the celebrated Grünes Gewölbe ("Green Vault").

== Works ==
His chief work was Taschenbuch zum geselligen Vergnügen ("Handbook for social enjoyment"; Leipzig 1791–1814). He was also the author of Erholungen ("Recreations"; Leipzig 1796–1810), Augusteum, Dresdens antike Denkmäler enthaltend ("Augusteum, location of Dresden's old monuments"; 1805–1809), with 162 engravings, Zweihundert seltene Münzen des Mittelalters ("200 rare coins from the Middle Ages"; 1813), and a large number of popular handbooks of art. He edited the Encomium moriae of Erasmus (German: Lob der Narrheit, "In Praise of Folly"; Basel, 1780), and published the works of Holbein (Berlin, 1781).

== Family ==
His son Wilhelm Adolf Becker was a noted classical scholar.
