= Fréjus =

Fréjus Frejús (Occitan)
- Commune
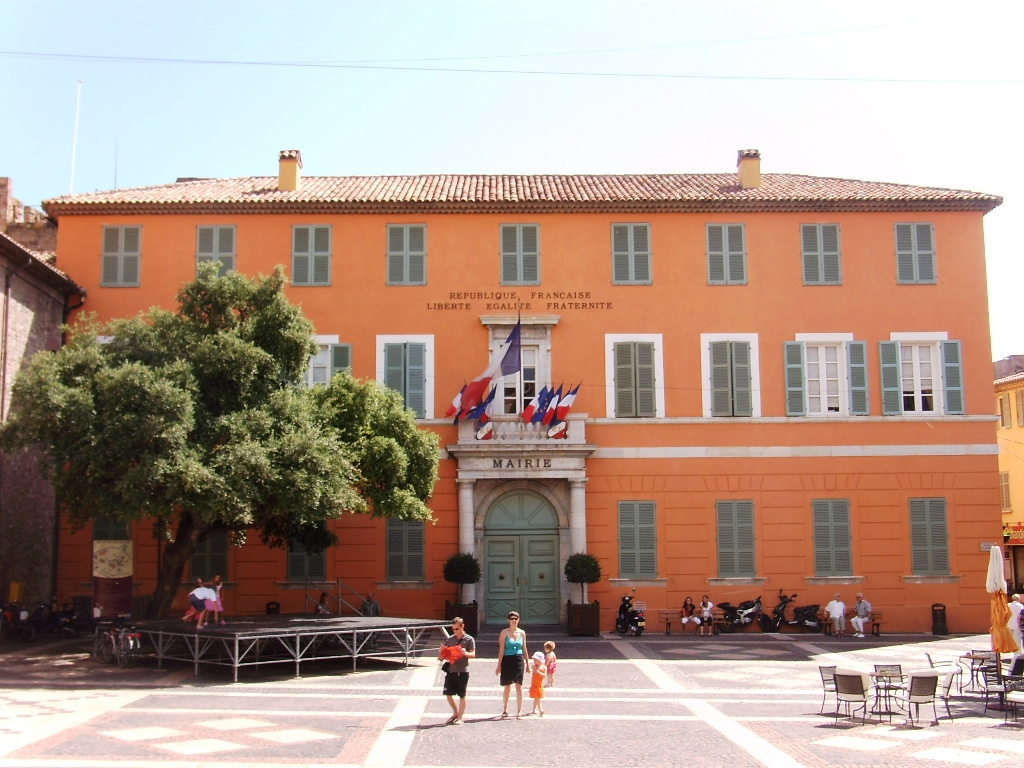
- The Hôtel de Ville

- Flag Coat of arms
- Location of Fréjus
- Location within France Location within Provence-Alpes-Côte d'Azur
- Coordinates: 43°25′59″N 6°44′13″E
- Country: France
- Region: Provence-Alpes-Côte d'Azur
- Department: Var
- Arrondissement: Draguignan
- Canton: Fréjus and Saint-Raphaël
- Intercommunality: Estérel Côte d'Azur Agglomération

Government
  - Mayor (2020–2026): David Rachline (RN)
- Area^{1}: 102.27 km^{2} (39.49 sq mi)
- Elevation: 8 m (26 ft)
- Highest elevation: 616 m (2,021 ft)
- Lowest elevation: 0 m (0 ft)
- Population (2023): 59,719
  - Density: 583.93/km^{2} (1,512.4/sq mi)
- Time zone: UTC+01:00 (CET)
  - Summer (DST): UTC+02:00 (CEST)
- INSEE/Postal code: 83061 /83600
- ^{1} French Land Register data, which excludes lakes, ponds, glaciers > 1 km^{2} (0.386 sq mi or 247 acres) and river estuaries.

Fréjus (French: [fʁeʒys]; Occitan: Frejús [fɾeˈdʒys]) is a commune and resort town in the Var department in the Provence-Alpes-Côte d'Azur region in Southeastern France.

It neighbours Saint-Raphaël, effectively forming one urban agglomeration. The north of the commune forms part of the Massif de l'Esterel. On 2 December 1959, the Malpasset Dam, on the Reyran River above the city of Fréjus, ruptured, killing over 400 people.

== History ==
The origins of Frejus probably lie with the Celto-Ligurian people who settled around the natural harbour of Aegytna. The remains of a defensive wall are still visible on Mont Auriasque and Cap Capelin. The Phocaeans of Marseille later established an outpost on the site.

=== Foundation ===
Frejus was strategically situated at an important crossroads formed by the Via Julia Augusta, which ran between Italy and the Rhône, and the Via Domitia. Tacitus called its port claustra maris, gateway to the sea. It is thought that the poet Cornelius Gallus was born there in 67 BC, though there are few traces of a settlement at that time.

Julius Caesar, wanting to counter the regional power of Massalia (present-day Marseille), which had sided with Pompeius against him in the civil war, refounded the city as Forum Julii, 'the forum of Julius', as a base of support in the region. The date is unclear but must be before 43 BC, when it appears in the correspondence between Plancus and Cicero. 49 BC is most likely.

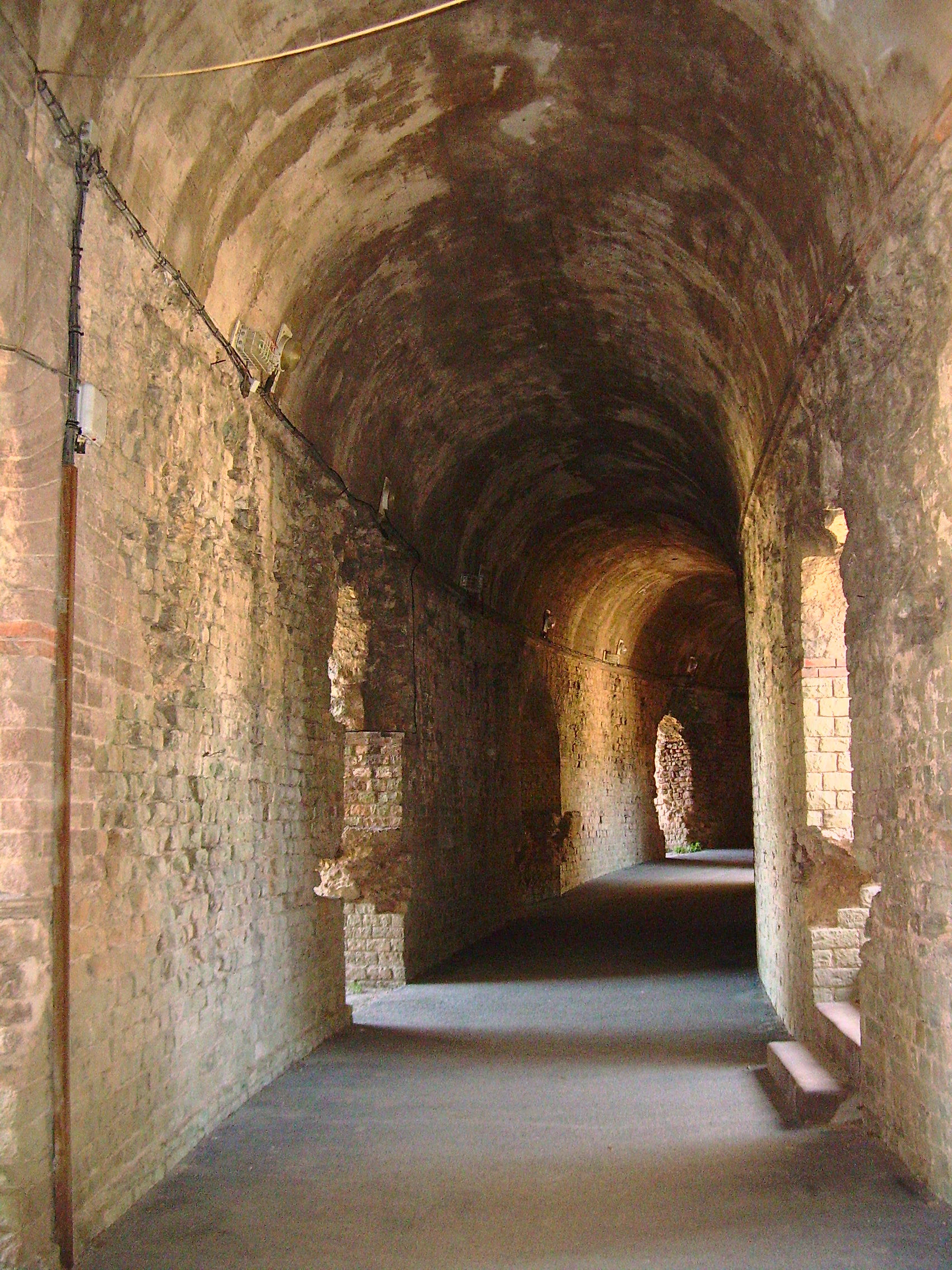
Amphitheatre

=== Roman city ===
It was at Forum Julii that Octavius repatriated the galleys taken from Mark Antony at the Battle of Actium in 31 BC. Between 29 and 27 BC, it became a colony for his veterans of the 8th legion, adding the suffix Octavanorum Colonia.

Augustus made the city the capital of the new province of Narbonensis in 22 BC, spurring rapid development and becoming one of the most important ports in the Mediterranean. The port served as the only naval base for the Roman fleet of Gaul and remained operative until the reign of Claudius. It was also only the second port after Ostia until at least the time of Nero.

Subsequently during the rule of Tiberius, the major monuments and amenities still visible today were constructed: the amphitheatre, the aqueduct, the lighthouse, the baths, and the theatre. Forum Julii had impressive city walls measuring 3.7 km in length that protected an area of 35 hectares. There were about six thousand inhabitants. The territory of the city, the civitas forojuliensis, extended from Cabasse in the west to Fayence and Mons in the north.

It became an important market town for crafts and agricultural production. Agriculture developed with villae rusticae such as those in Villepey and Saint-Raphaël. The mining of green sandstone and blue porphyry and fish farming contributed to the thriving economy.

In A.D. 40 Gnaeus Julius Agricola, who later completed the Roman conquest of Britain, was born in Forum Julii. He was father-in-law to the historian Tacitus, whose biography of Agricola mentions that Forum Julii was an "ancient and illustrious colony". The city was also mentioned several times in the writings of Strabo and Pliny the Elder.

In early A.D. 69 the Battle of Forum Julii was fought between the armies of the rival emperors Otho and Vitellius. The exact location of this battle is not known, but afterwards Vitellius retreated to Antipolis.

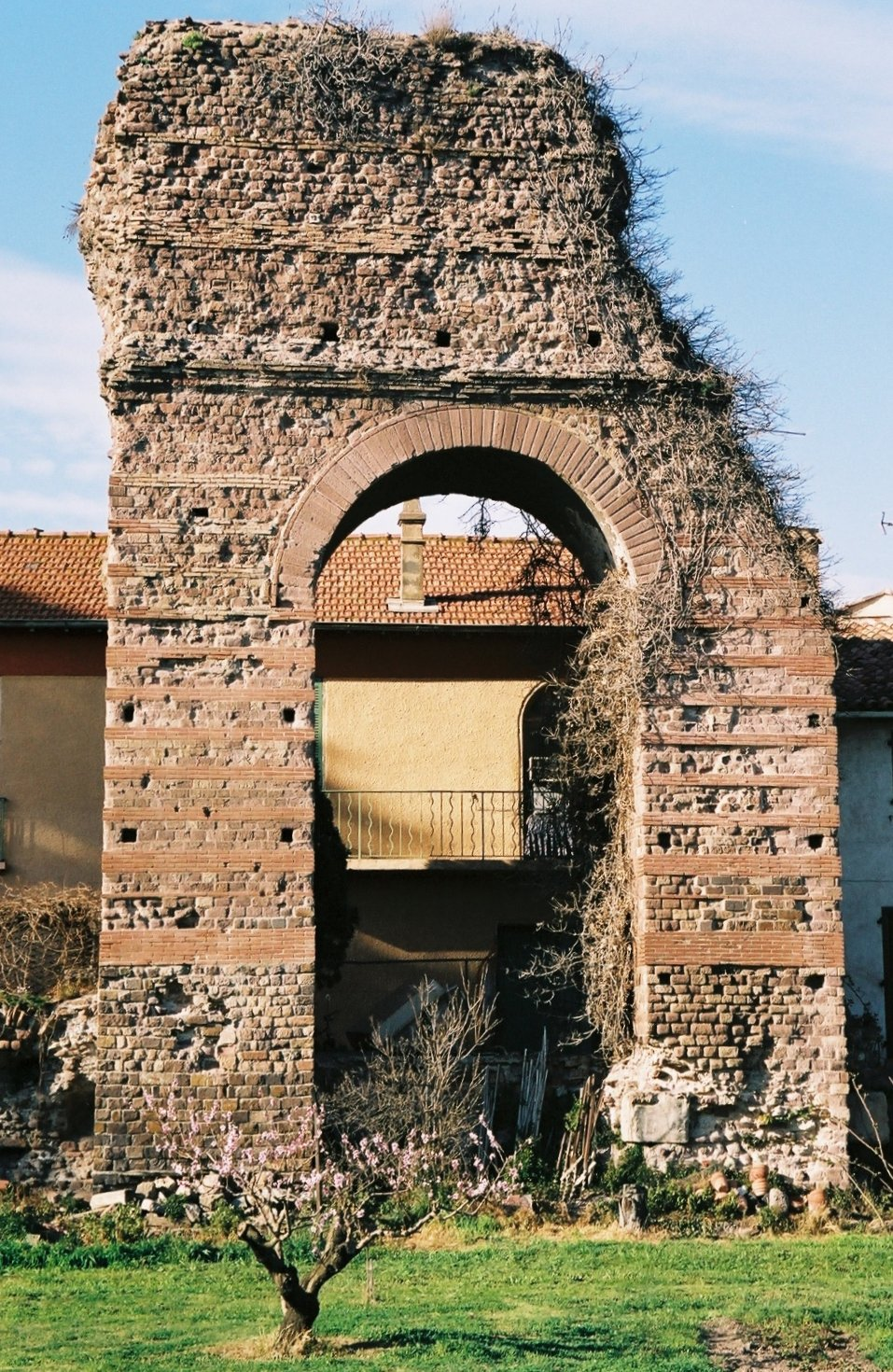
Roman baths: arch (Porte d'Orée or Porte Dorée).

The 4th century saw the creation of the Diocese of Fréjus, France's second largest after that of Lyon; the construction of the first church is attested in 374 with the election of a bishop. Saint-Léonce became Bishop of Fréjus in 433 and wrote: "From 374, at the Council of Valencia, a bishop was appointed in Frejus, but he never came. I was the first of the bishops of that city. I was able to build the first Cathedral with its Baptistery."

The decay of Rome led to that of the cities of its empire.

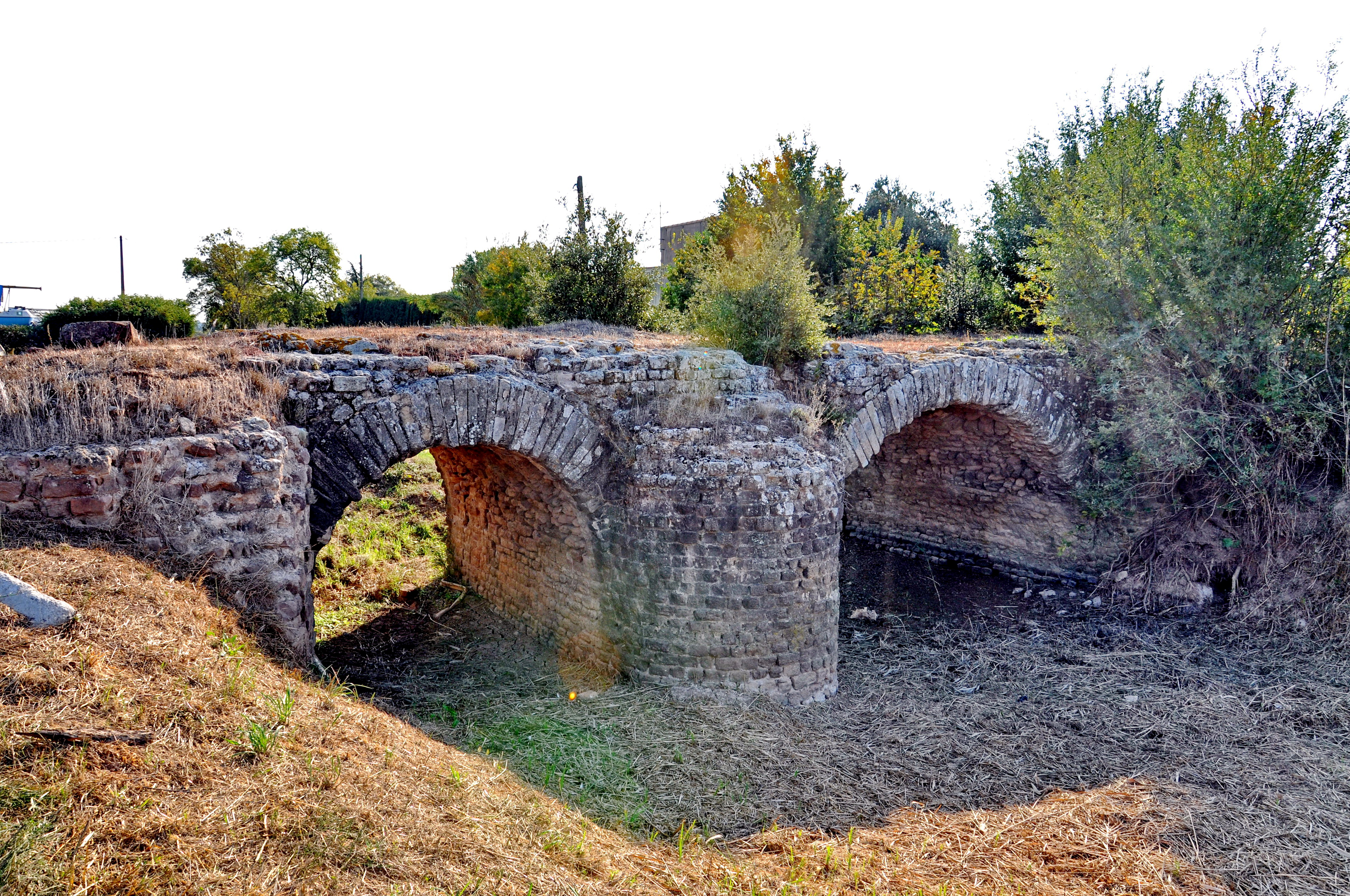
Roman road bridge "des Esclapes".

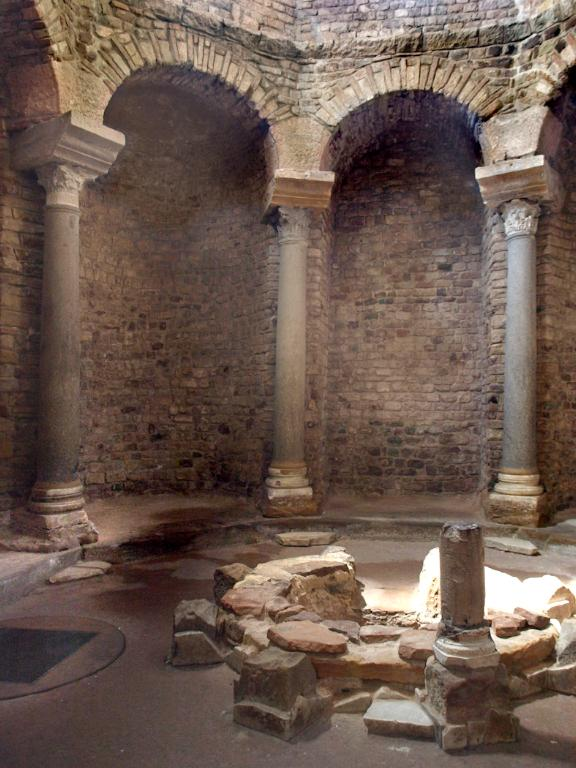
Baptistry in the cathedral.

=== Other sights ===
The richest architecture belongs to the Roman city whose many buildings make it the richest concentration of this period in France after Arles. The most notable are the amphitheatre, the aqueduct from Mons, Var, as well as the theatre.

In addition the old town is home to many other impressive remains, city walls, the two gates (of Rome, of Reyran), the square of Agricola with the gate of the Gauls, an exedra and the platform with a cistern on the Butte Saint-Antoine, the paving of the via Aurelia which passed through the city, the remains of the ancient harbour with the remains of the north quay, the lighthouse and quay of Augustus, a mosaic floor of fighting cocks in a private property, the sewers under the present rue Jean Jaures, the baptistry in Frejus Cathedral dates from the 5th century AD and columns there are from Roman buildings.

No fewer than five public baths are known in the city, those of the Porte Dorée, the Plate-Forme, les Poiriers, Villeneuve (probably military, and incorporated in modern buildings) and on the Butte Saint-Antoine, three of which are outside the city walls.

A probable military or naval camp was excavated at Aiguières, Villeneuve near the ancient shore line and associated with the nearby baths, and also a 4th-century mausoleum at rue de La Tourrache. The remains of a suburban villa are at La Rose des Sables. Roman road bridges still exist at Cantonniers and at Esclapes (with three arches), a fulling mill at Arsenal, and a necropolis in Sainte-Brigitte and fishponds on the coast at Saint-Aygulf.

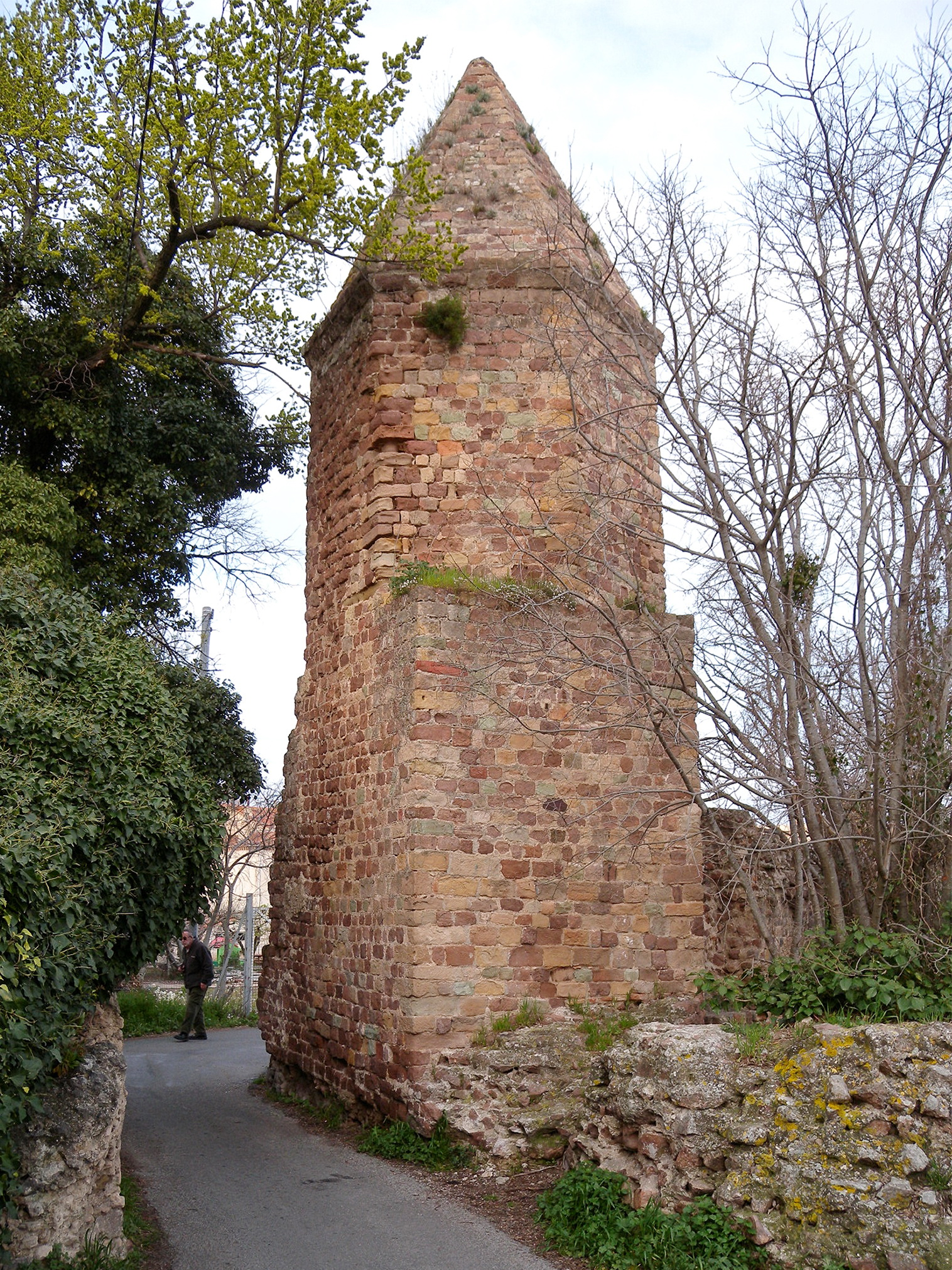
"Lanterne Auguste", Roman lighthouse.

=== Aqueduct ===
The aqueduct is 42 km long and runs for 1.8 km on bridges and 500m on walls. Large parts of the aqueduct are still well preserved.

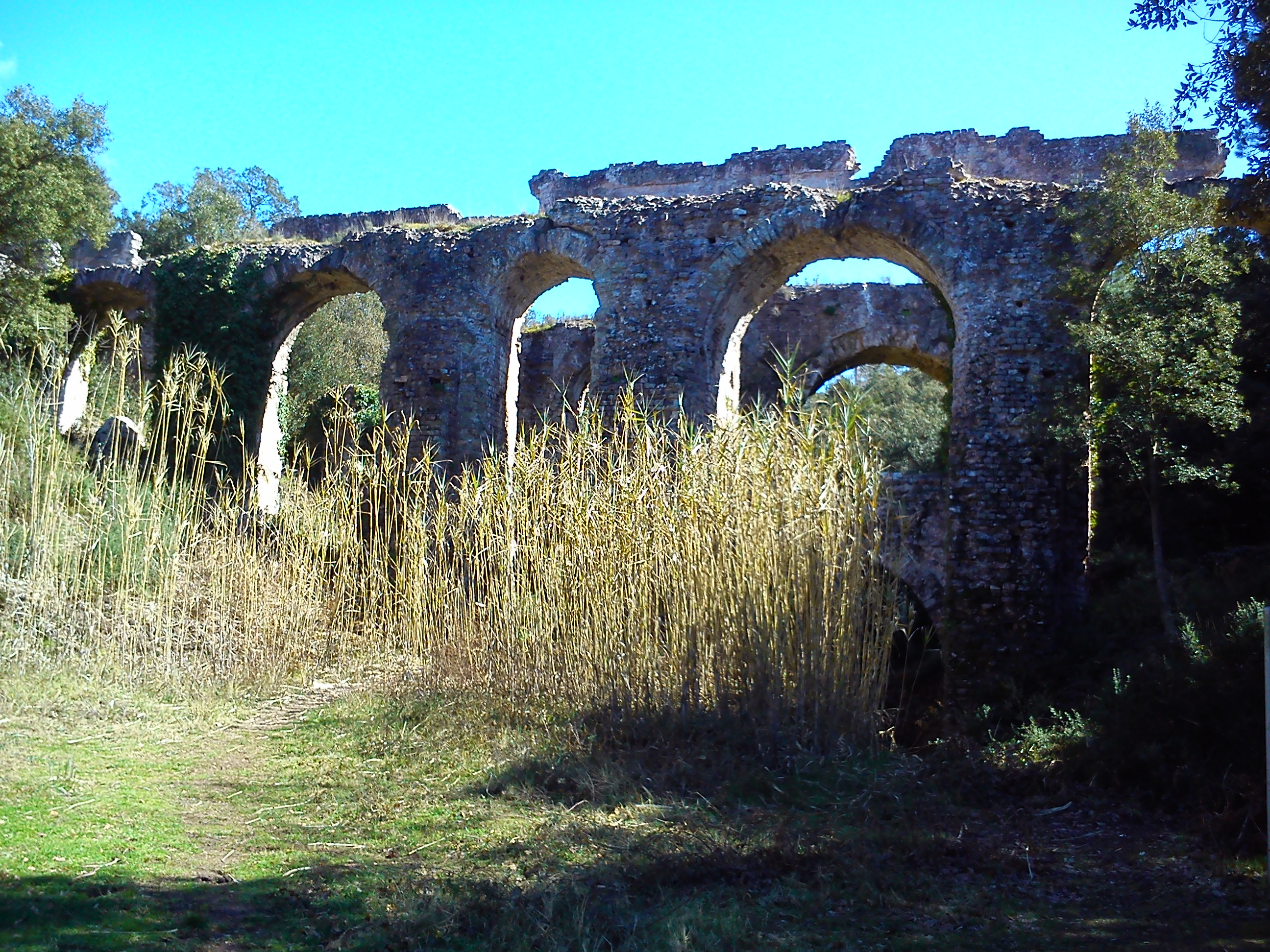
Aqueduct bridge at Senequier.

=== Roman port ===
An archaeological campaign in July 2005 revealed a portion of ancient rocky coast which showed it was almost one kilometre further inland than current estimates. In the middle of the 1st century AD at the time of the creation of Forum Iulii, this coastline was a narrow band of approximately 100m wide at the south of the Butte Saint-Antoine. Further archaeology has revealed much information on the ancient port. A Triton monument was discovered at the entrance to the harbour. This statue and the remains of a Roman building at the end of the eastern quay nearby, shows this site to be a lighthouse.

Two lighthouses were constructed on the quays and a third assisted mariners in locating the harbour's sea entrance. The third, situated on the Île du Lion de Mer, would have been the primary beacon that ships would have navigated toward. As ships approached the harbour, the Triton lighthouse on the northern side of the channel into the harbour and the other lighthouse on the southern side would have marked the entrance and thus provided safe passage into the harbour.

=== Post-Roman history ===
Between the 7th and the 9th centuries, Muslim invaders repeatedly raided the city. The sea encroached on the land while invasions by the Muslims and pirates left the monuments in ruin. By the 10th century there was very little left of the colony, mostly rubble. Sea-borne silt clogged up the port and led to the formation of a huge swampy plain, which then separated the village from the sea.

Napoleon landed at Fréjus on 9 October 1799, returning from Egypt in order to ostensibly defend the French Directory in Paris. The Hôtel de Ville (town hall) was completed in 1825.

During the First World War Fréjus became the main centre for hivernage (wintering) for the Senegalese Tirailleurs. The town also contained segregated hospitals with images of African village life painted on the walls.

== Geography ==
As a backdrop there is the Massif de l'Esterel.

== Demographics ==
Historical population

| Year | Pop. | ±% p.a. |
|---|---|---|
| 1793 | 2,400 | — |
| 1800 | 2,229 | −1.05% |
| 1806 | 1,943 | −2.26% |
| 1821 | 2,306 | +1.15% |
| 1831 | 2,665 | +1.46% |
| 1836 | 3,041 | +2.67% |
| 1841 | 3,062 | +0.14% |
| 1846 | 3,132 | +0.45% |
| 1851 | 2,665 | −3.18% |
| 1856 | 2,727 | +0.46% |
| 1861 | 2,878 | +1.08% |
| 1866 | 3,050 | +1.17% |
| 1872 | 3,052 | +0.01% |
| 1876 | 3,478 | +3.32% |
| 1881 | 3,135 | −2.06% |
| 1886 | 3,540 | +2.46% |
| 1891 | 3,139 | −2.38% |
| 1896 | 3,510 | +2.26% |
| 1901 | 4,156 | +3.44% |

| Year | Pop. | ±% p.a. |
|---|---|---|
| 1906 | 4,190 | +0.16% |
| 1911 | 4,022 | −0.82% |
| 1921 | 9,451 | +8.92% |
| 1926 | 9,091 | −0.77% |
| 1931 | 9,676 | +1.26% |
| 1936 | 9,441 | −0.49% |
| 1946 | 12,907 | +3.18% |
| 1954 | 13,452 | +0.52% |
| 1962 | 16,953 | +2.93% |
| 1968 | 23,629 | +5.69% |
| 1975 | 28,851 | +2.89% |
| 1982 | 31,662 | +1.34% |
| 1990 | 41,486 | +3.44% |
| 1999 | 46,801 | +1.35% |
| 2007 | 52,436 | +1.43% |
| 2012 | 52,532 | +0.04% |
| 2017 | 52,672 | +0.05% |
| 2023 | 59,719 | +2.11% |

Source: EHESS and INSEE (1968–2023)

== Politics ==
In 2014, David Rachline of the National Front (later renamed National Rally) was elected Mayor of Fréjus.

List of mayors of Fréjus
| Start | End | Name | Party |
|---|---|---|---|
| 1977 | 1997 | François Léotard | UDF–PR |
| 1997 | 2014 | Élie Brun | UMP |
| 2014 | Present | David Rachline | FN/RN |

== Economy ==
Fréjus is a resort town which hosts three to four times as many people as its regular inhabitants over the summer. It organises several fairs throughout the year; there is the pottery fair and the Bravade amongst its Roman and Gothic architecture with the 'old tile' roof tops and tinted walls. Port Fréjus which has a capacity of 750 moorings, is surrounded by beautiful fine sandy beaches. There is an annual 'Roc d'Azur' mountain bike event.

== Transport ==
The Fréjus railway station offers connections to Saint-Raphaël, Les Arcs and Cannes and a few other regional destinations. Long distance destinations are accessible from the nearby Saint-Raphaël-Valescure station. The A8 autoroute connects Fréjus with Aix-en-Provence and Nice.

Frejus Airport is closed.

== Climate ==
Fréjus has a hot-summer mediterranean climate (Köppen climate classification: Csa).

Climate data for Fréjus (1991–2020 averages, extremes 1919–present)
| Month | Jan | Feb | Mar | Apr | May | Jun | Jul | Aug | Sep | Oct | Nov | Dec | Year |
|---|---|---|---|---|---|---|---|---|---|---|---|---|---|
| Record high °C (°F) | 22.8 (73.0) | 26.4 (79.5) | 27.3 (81.1) | 28.3 (82.9) | 32.6 (90.7) | 37.7 (99.9) | 42.5 (108.5) | 41.5 (106.7) | 35.4 (95.7) | 35.9 (96.6) | 26.6 (79.9) | 23.2 (73.8) | 42.5 (108.5) |
| Mean daily maximum °C (°F) | 13.3 (55.9) | 14.0 (57.2) | 16.3 (61.3) | 18.6 (65.5) | 22.4 (72.3) | 26.3 (79.3) | 29.1 (84.4) | 29.3 (84.7) | 25.6 (78.1) | 21.5 (70.7) | 16.9 (62.4) | 13.7 (56.7) | 20.6 (69.1) |
| Daily mean °C (°F) | 8.6 (47.5) | 8.9 (48.0) | 11.2 (52.2) | 13.6 (56.5) | 17.4 (63.3) | 21.2 (70.2) | 23.8 (74.8) | 24.0 (75.2) | 20.5 (68.9) | 16.9 (62.4) | 12.5 (54.5) | 9.3 (48.7) | 15.7 (60.3) |
| Mean daily minimum °C (°F) | 4.0 (39.2) | 3.8 (38.8) | 6.1 (43.0) | 8.6 (47.5) | 12.6 (54.7) | 16.2 (61.2) | 18.6 (65.5) | 18.7 (65.7) | 15.4 (59.7) | 12.2 (54.0) | 8.0 (46.4) | 4.9 (40.8) | 10.8 (51.4) |
| Record low °C (°F) | −9.0 (15.8) | −12.0 (10.4) | −8.6 (16.5) | −1.8 (28.8) | 1.1 (34.0) | 5.5 (41.9) | 7.5 (45.5) | 7.7 (45.9) | 4.5 (40.1) | 0.1 (32.2) | −3.3 (26.1) | −7.0 (19.4) | −12.0 (10.4) |
| Average precipitation mm (inches) | 69.8 (2.75) | 51.6 (2.03) | 49.6 (1.95) | 70.2 (2.76) | 43.9 (1.73) | 31.8 (1.25) | 15.6 (0.61) | 27.2 (1.07) | 81.0 (3.19) | 115.5 (4.55) | 132.5 (5.22) | 96.9 (3.81) | 785.6 (30.93) |
| Average precipitation days (≥ 1.0 mm) | 5.7 | 5.1 | 5.0 | 6.4 | 5.0 | 3.4 | 1.4 | 2.1 | 4.8 | 7.4 | 8.3 | 6.5 | 61.3 |
| Average snowy days | 0.7 | 0.4 | 0.1 | 0.0 | 0.0 | 0.0 | 0.0 | 0.0 | 0.0 | 0.0 | 0.1 | 0.2 | 1.5 |
| Average relative humidity (%) | 75 | 73 | 72 | 73 | 76 | 75 | 73 | 74 | 77 | 78 | 77 | 76 | 74.9 |
| Mean monthly sunshine hours | 155.9 | 166.6 | 217.7 | 220.7 | 264.9 | 311.1 | 346.1 | 313.4 | 234.2 | 171.9 | 141.6 | 121.2 | 2,665.2 |
Source 1: Meteo France, Meteociel.fr (sun 1981-2010)
Source 2: Infoclimat.fr (humidity and snowy days 1961–1990)

== Twin towns and sister cities ==
Fréjus is twinned with:

- Fredericksburg, United States
- Triberg, Germany
- Dumbéa, France
- Paola, Italy
- Tabarka, Tunisia

== People ==
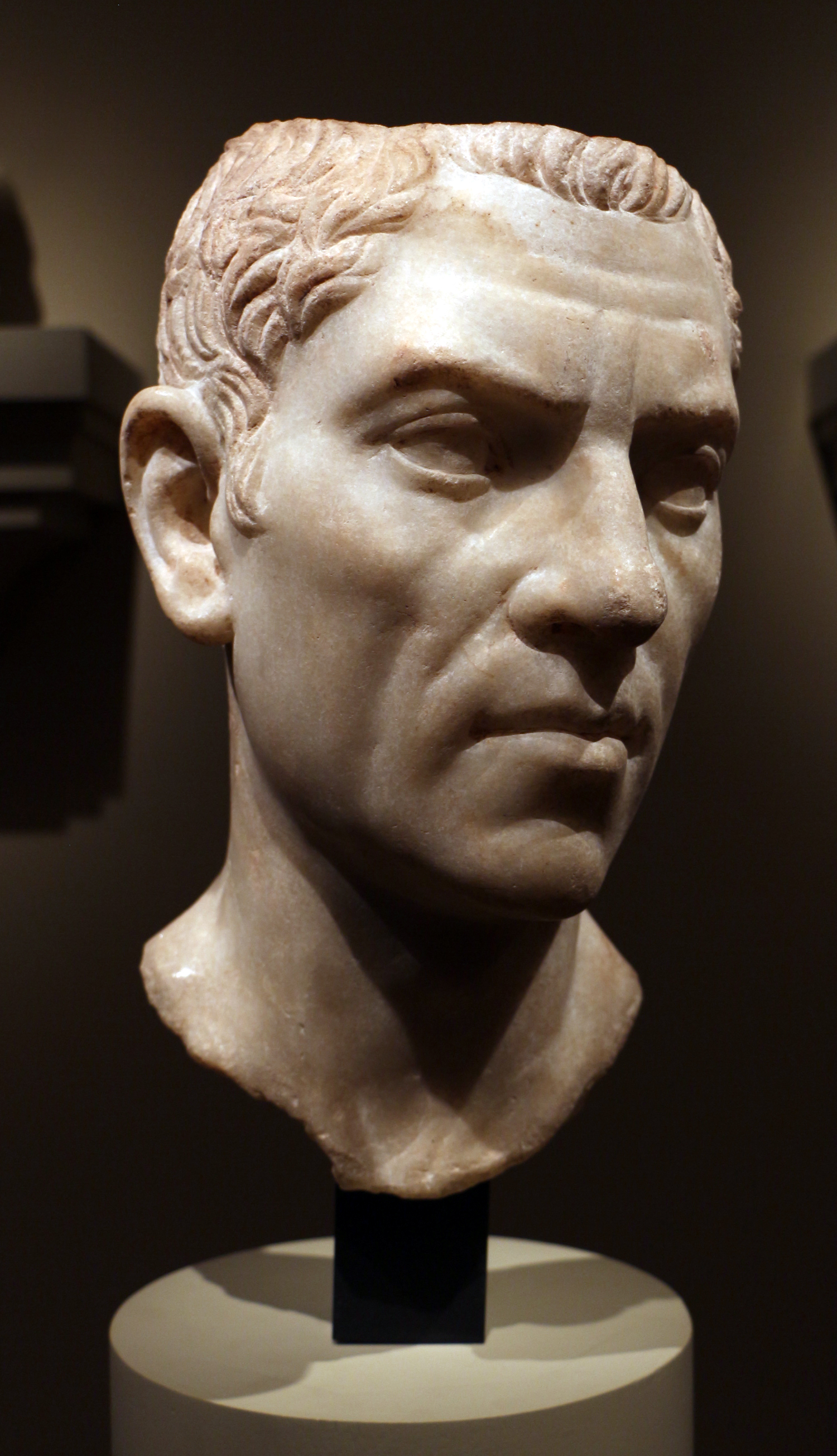
Cornelius Gallus, ca.30 BC

- Cornelius Gallus (ca.70–26 BC), a Roman poet, orator and politician.
- Gnaeus Julius Agricola (AD 40–93), a Roman governor of the province of Britain.
- St. Maximus (died 460), Abbot at Lerins and Bishop of Frejus
- Bernard (or Bertrand) de Candie, writer, bachelor of canon law, in 1454 vicar general of Fréjus; and 1461 archdeacon of the Church of Fréjus; 1464 installed provost, he was advisor to King René in 1474. He died in 1482.
- Marc-Antoine Désaugiers (1742–1793) & Marc-Antoine Madeleine Désaugiers (1772–1827), French composers
- Emmanuel Joseph Sieyès (1748–1836), known as Abbé Sieyès, French Revolution theorist and author of What is the Third Estate?.
- Patrick Salameh (born 1957), a French criminal and serial killer.
- Belinda Carlisle (born 1958), American singer, musician & author; partly lived here 1994-2017.
- Casey Legler (born 1977), a French-American writer, restaurateur, model and former Olympic swimmer.
- Anna Mouglalis (born 1978), a French actress and model.
- David Rachline (born 1987), politician and mayor of Fréjus from March 2014
- Bryan Ferry (born 1945), suave English rock singer, performed a major concert with Roxy Music in 1982.

=== Sport ===
- Odiah Sidibe (born 1970), a French sprint athlete of Guinean descent
- Yoann Richomme (born 1983), a French navigator, sailor and yacht skipper.
- Adil Rami (born 1985), a footballer with about 450 club caps and 36 for France
- Marc Andreu (born 1985), rugby union player
- Kévin Constant (born 1987), a footballer with 228 club caps and 24 for Guinea
- Anthony Modeste (born 1988), a French footballer with over 400 club caps
- Layvin Kurzawa (born 1992), a footballer with over 200 club caps and 13 for France

== See also ==
- Bishopric of Fréjus
- Malpasset
- Communes of the Var department
