= Saint-Raphaël, Var =

Saint-Raphaël Sant Rafèu (Occitan)
- Commune
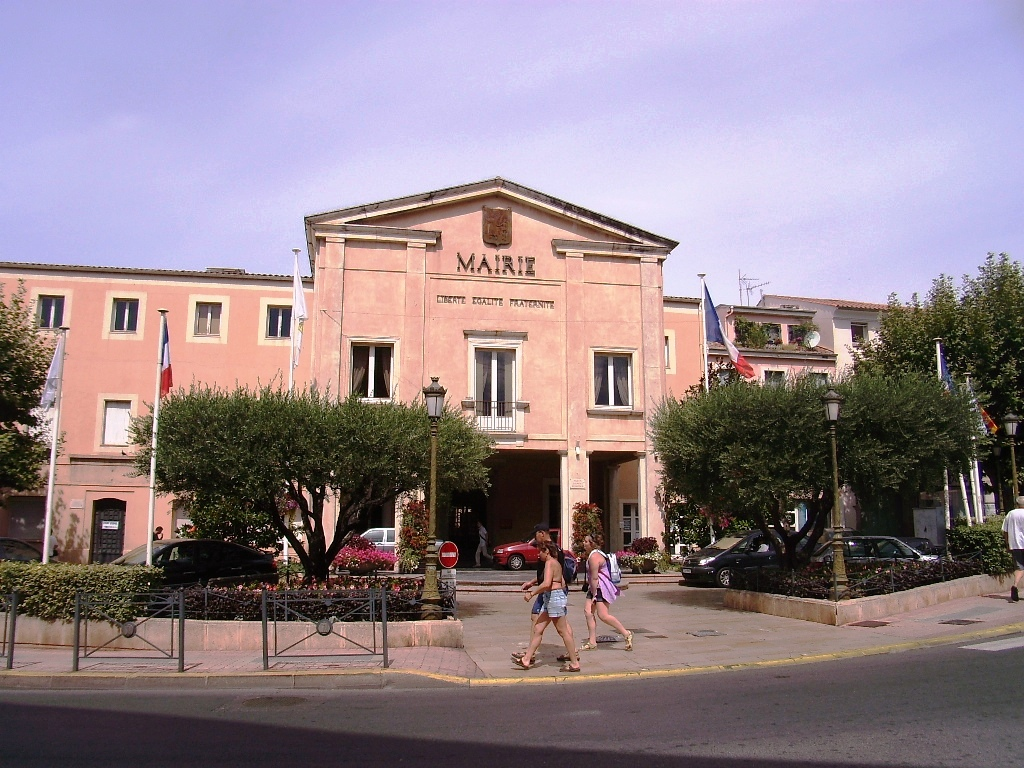
- Town hall

- Coat of arms
- Location of Saint-Raphaël
- Location within France Location within Provence-Alpes-Côte d'Azur
- Coordinates: 43°25′31″N 6°46′06″E
- Country: France
- Region: Provence-Alpes-Côte d'Azur
- Department: Var
- Arrondissement: Draguignan
- Canton: Saint-Raphaël
- Intercommunality: Estérel Côte d'Azur Agglomération

Government
  - Mayor (2020–2026): Frédéric Masquelier
- Area^{1}: 89.59 km^{2} (34.59 sq mi)
- Elevation: 10 m (33 ft)
- Highest elevation: 560 m (1,840 ft)
- Lowest elevation: 0 m (0 ft)
- Population (2023): 37,113
  - Density: 414.3/km^{2} (1,073/sq mi)
- Time zone: UTC+01:00 (CET)
  - Summer (DST): UTC+02:00 (CEST)
- INSEE/Postal code: 83118 /83700 and 83530
- ^{1} French Land Register data, which excludes lakes, ponds, glaciers > 1 km^{2} (0.386 sq mi or 247 acres) and river estuaries.

Saint-Raphaël (French pronunciation: [sɛ̃ ʁafaɛl]; Occitan: Sant Rafèu Occitan pronunciation: [ˈsan raˈfɛw]) is a commune in the Var department, Provence-Alpes-Côte d'Azur region, Southeastern France.

Immediately to the west of Saint-Raphaël lies a larger and older town, Fréjus; together they form an urban agglomeration known as Var Estérel Méditerranée, which also encompasses the smaller communes of Les Adrets-de-l'Estérel, Puget-sur-Argens and Roquebrune-sur-Argens. In the second half of the 19th century, the township came under the influence of Mayor Felix Martin and writer Jean-Baptiste Alphonse Karr; owing to their efforts and its beneficial climate the commune developed into a seaside resort popular with artists, sportsmen and politicians.

It is the seat of the canton of Saint-Raphaël, also encompassing Fréjus and Les Adrets-de-l'Estérel, which is the economic and cultural centre of Eastern Var, within the arrondissement of Draguignan. Its inhabitants are called Raphaëlois in French generally, or Rafelencs in Provençal Occitan.

== History ==
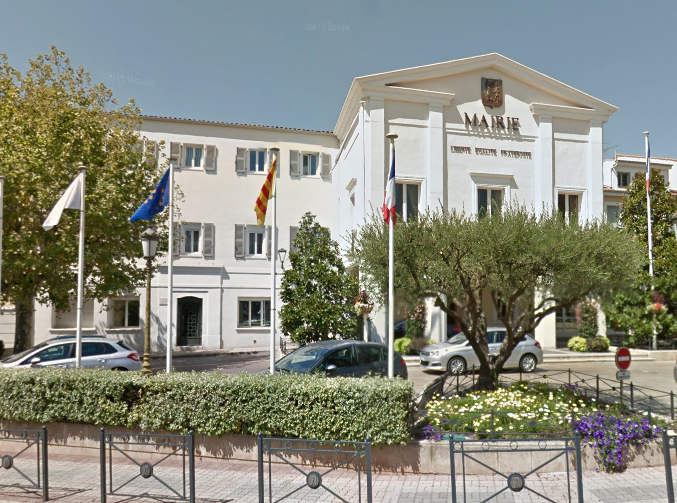
The Hôtel de Ville

In 1799 Napoleon Bonaparte and his forces arrived by ship from Egypt, prior to his coup d'état in Paris, and landed at a fishing village that was the commune of Saint-Raphaël. The Hôtel de Ville was completed in 1832.

The coastal double-track rail link between Saint-Raphaël and Nice passes over a substantial viaduct constructed right on the shoreline at Anthéor. These tracks were of strategic importance to the Axis forces during World War II for supplying material to units in France.

There were three separate air raids made on this viaduct from England, between September 1943 and February 1944, involving a total of 31 Lancaster bombers operating some 700 miles from base. Aircraft of the second raid flew on to Rabat, and from the third raid on to Sardinia. One Lancaster from the first raid was lost, and a flight lieutenant bomb aimer on the third raid was killed by enemy fire, some of which came from ships at sea. All the raids failed in their objective and the rail link was not severed.

During World War II, on August 15, 1944, it was one of the sites of a beach landing in Operation Dragoon, the Allied invasion of southern France.

== Population ==
Historical population

Year	Pop.	±% p.a.
1793	409	—
1800	501	+2.94%
1806	647	+4.35%
1821	883	+2.09%
1831	966	+0.90%
1836	974	+0.17%
1841	955	−0.39%
1846	994	+0.80%
1851	1,041	+0.93%
1856	1,055	+0.27%
1861	1,143	+1.62%
1866	1,271	+2.15%
1872	1,461	+2.35%
1876	1,508	+0.79%
1881	2,456	+10.25%
1886	3,227	+5.61%
1891	3,810	+3.38%
1896	4,270	+2.31%
1901	4,865	+2.64%

Year	Pop.	±% p.a.
1906	4,893	+0.11%
1911	5,112	+0.88%
1921	6,183	+1.92%
1926	8,919	+7.60%
1931	9,539	+1.35%
1936	9,635	+0.20%
1946	8,969	−0.71%
1954	10,177	+1.59%
1962	13,425	+3.52%
1968	17,844	+4.86%
1975	21,080	+2.41%
1982	24,118	+1.94%
1990	26,616	+1.24%
1999	30,671	+1.59%
2007	34,381	+1.44%
2012	34,115	−0.16%
2017	35,042	+0.54%
2023	37,113	+0.96%

Source: EHESS and INSEE (1968-2023)

== Geography ==
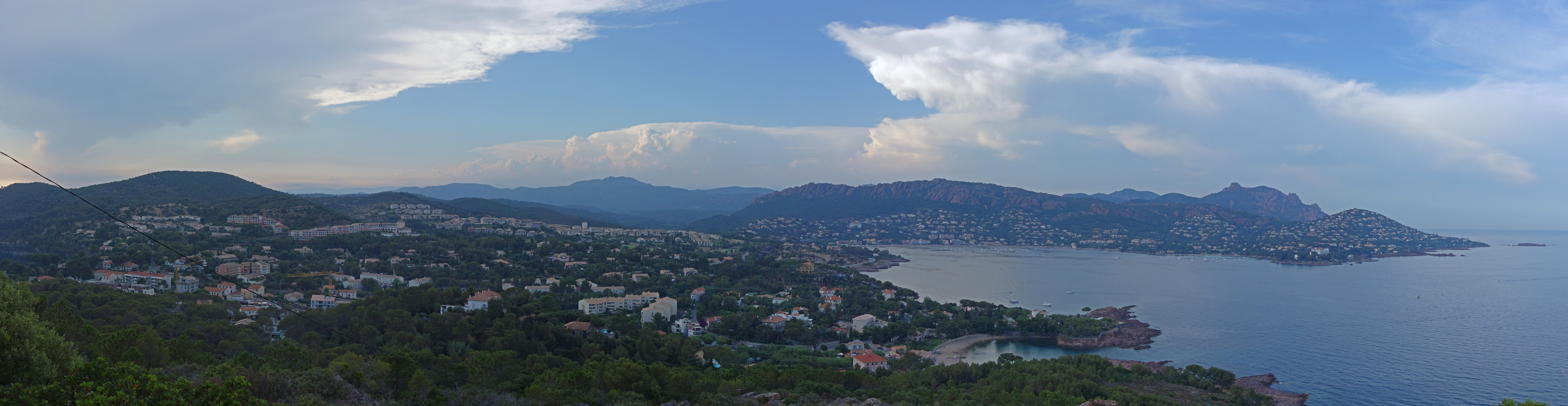
The eastern part of Saint-Raphaël, with its village Agay beyond the bay, as seen from Cap Dramont.
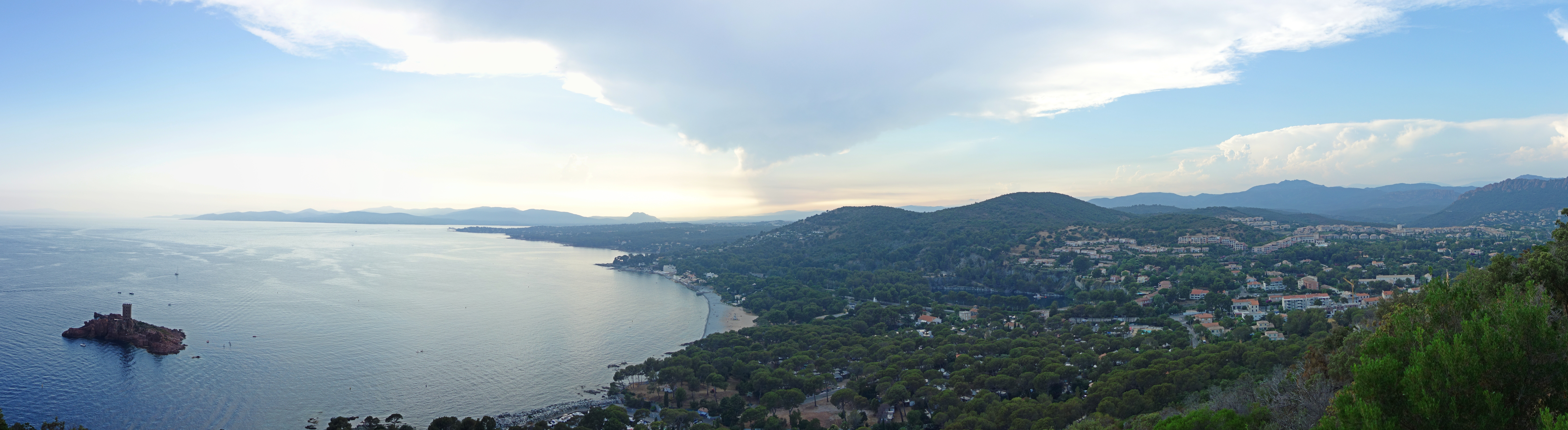
The western part of Saint-Raphaël, with the Île d'Or on the left, as seen from Cap Dramont.

Saint-Raphaël is located at the extreme eastern end of the Var, along the border with the adjacent département of Alpes-Maritimes, which occupies the far south-eastern corner of France at the frontier with Italy. The commune has a total of thirty-six kilometres (22 miles) of Mediterranean coastline, owing mainly to the many coves and creeks formed between the natural region of the Esterel Massif (Massif de l'Esterel) and the sea. This places it second only to Marseilles, with fifty-seven kilometres (35 miles) of coastline. The commune is 89.59 km^{2} in extent. It is almost completely urbanised in the west, but includes over 60 km^{2} of protected areas of natural forest and the Esterel mountains.

Saint-Raphaël has four large sandy beaches: one near the city centre, called the Veillat; one at Boulouris; one at Le Dramont, and the fourth at Agay. There are two smaller ones at Anthéor and Le Trayas.

=== Rivers ===
Saint-Raphaël is separated from Fréjus by the River Pédégal: fed by the Garonne, the Adrets-of-l'Esterel, Saint-Jean-de-Cannes and Saint-Jean-de-l'Esterel.

The River Agay flows from the mountains down through the village of that name, and is fed by the streams Cabre, Perthus and Grenouillet. The Grenouillet is the most important of these streams, having average flows of between 43 cu m/s in July and 1160 cu m/s in January.

The River Valescure, which is channelled through the Barrage des Crous (dam), discharges into the River Reyran at Fréjus.

=== Mountains ===
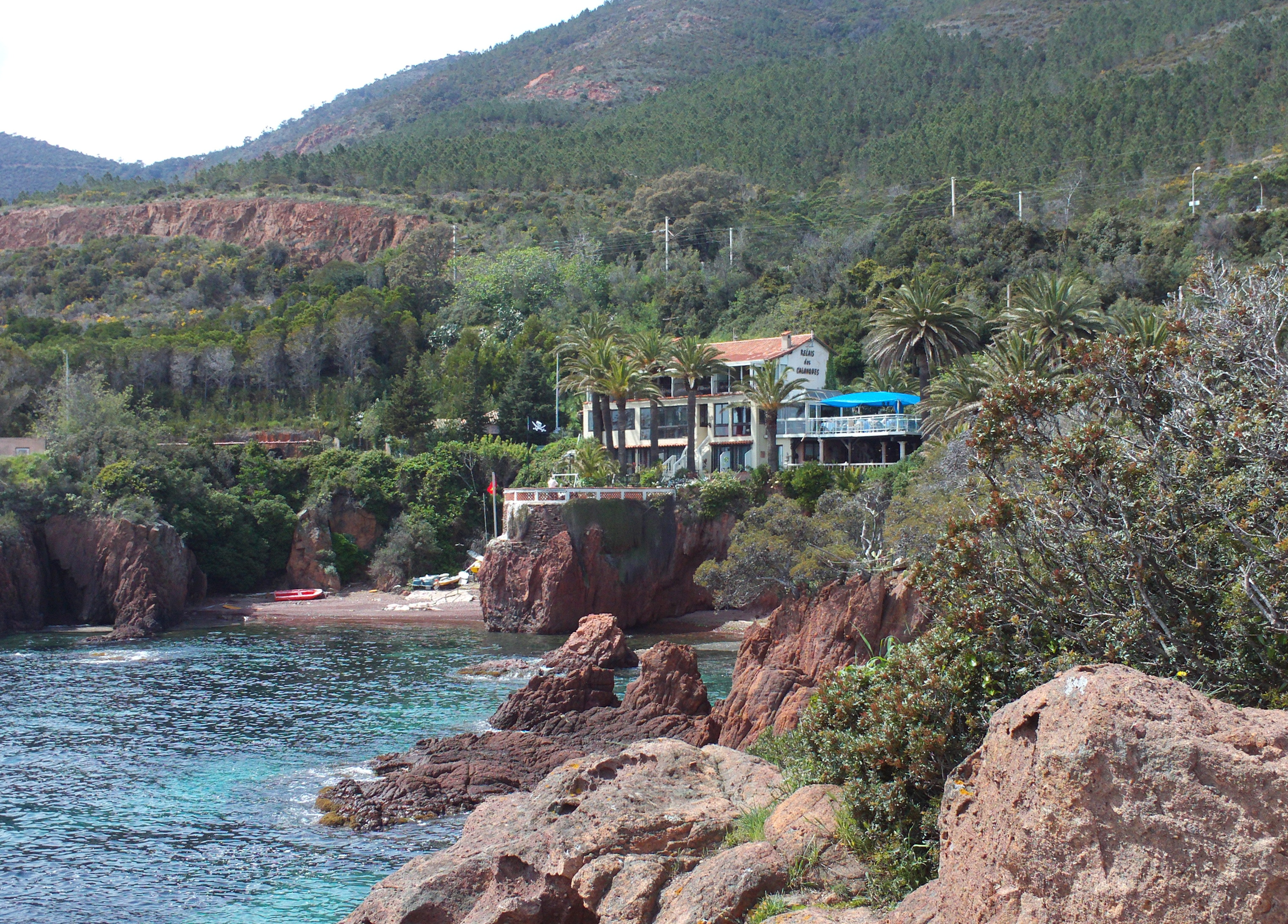
Commune de Saint-Raphaël includes Le Trayas at the extreme eastern end (at Forêt Domaniale de l'Estérel and Mediterranean Sea coast)

From east to west the commune has several mountain summits rising from the massif. Mont Vinaigre in Fréjus stands at 618 metres (2,028 feet), Rastel d'Agay at 287 m (942 ft), Pic de l'Ours (carrying a transmitter aerial) at 492 m (1,614 ft), Pic du Cap Roux at 453 m (1,486 ft), and Pic d'Aurèle at 322 m (1,056 ft).

Situated almost entirely on the Esterel Massif, the commune sits on soil of red porphyr, which makes for picturesque scenes along the coast where the soil and rocks are exposed on cliff faces and rocky shores. Three important and spectacular rocks dominate the seascape: Cap Roux at 360 m (1,180 ft), Saint-Pilon at 295 m (968 ft), and the Rock of Saint-Barthélemy.

=== Adjacent places ===
Immediately to the west and north-west of Saint-Raphaël lies the ancient town of Fréjus. To the north lie the hamlets of Saint-Jean-de-l'Esterel et Saint-Jean-de-Cannes, both within the Fréjus commune. To the extreme north-east, beyond Le Trayas, is the small resort of Miramar, lying within the commune of Théoule-sur-Mer. The Mediterranean Sea lies to the south of the whole Saint-Raphaël commune.

=== Climate ===
St. Raphaël is located on the Côte d'Azur and enjoys a Mediterranean climate with hot, dry summers and mild, humid winters. The Mistral wind occurs, although sometimes the town is sheltered from this by the Massif des Maures and the Esterel. It is perhaps more exposed to the Levant (strong, easterly, wet) or the Sirocco (very strong, southerly, hot) air flows, but these occur rarely. The wind velocity record was established on 30 January 1986, with gusts of 140 km (87 mi) per hour.

Climate data for Saint-Raphaël (1991–2020 averages, extremes 1966–2007)
Month	Jan	Feb	Mar	Apr	May	Jun	Jul	Aug	Sep	Oct	Nov	Dec	Year
Record high °C (°F)	20.2 (68.4)	21.6 (70.9)	34.6 (94.3)	26.7 (80.1)	31.0 (87.8)	34.0 (93.2)	37.2 (99.0)	36.5 (97.7)	32.8 (91.0)	28.0 (82.4)	23.0 (73.4)	20.5 (68.9)	37.2 (99.0)
Mean daily maximum °C (°F)	12.5 (54.5)	13.4 (56.1)	15.9 (60.6)	17.8 (64.0)	22.5 (72.5)	26.6 (79.9)	29.7 (85.5)	30.1 (86.2)	25.3 (77.5)	20.6 (69.1)	15.9 (60.6)	13.0 (55.4)	20.3 (68.5)
Daily mean °C (°F)	9.3 (48.7)	9.6 (49.3)	11.9 (53.4)	13.8 (56.8)	18.2 (64.8)	22.1 (71.8)	24.9 (76.8)	25.3 (77.5)	21.0 (69.8)	17.2 (63.0)	12.6 (54.7)	9.9 (49.8)	16.3 (61.3)
Mean daily minimum °C (°F)	6.0 (42.8)	5.8 (42.4)	7.9 (46.2)	9.7 (49.5)	14.0 (57.2)	17.5 (63.5)	20.2 (68.4)	20.5 (68.9)	16.7 (62.1)	13.8 (56.8)	9.3 (48.7)	6.8 (44.2)	12.4 (54.3)
Record low °C (°F)	−9.6 (14.7)	−7.8 (18.0)	−7.2 (19.0)	−0.4 (31.3)	5.0 (41.0)	7.4 (45.3)	12.0 (53.6)	11.0 (51.8)	6.8 (44.2)	2.9 (37.2)	−1.5 (29.3)	−4.1 (24.6)	−9.6 (14.7)
Average precipitation mm (inches)	72.9 (2.87)	49.7 (1.96)	52.1 (2.05)	75.1 (2.96)	42.3 (1.67)	32.0 (1.26)	10.6 (0.42)	25.5 (1.00)	73.8 (2.91)	112.6 (4.43)	138.0 (5.43)	96.3 (3.79)	780.9 (30.74)
Average precipitation days (≥ 1.0 mm)	6.0	5.3	5.2	6.6	5.0	3.2	1.4	2.2	4.6	7.4	8.5	6.4	61.8
Source: Météo-France

== Travel ==
=== Rail ===
The town's modern rail station is named Saint-Raphaël-Valescure and offers national, regional, and local train services:

- High-speed TGV and Ouigo trains - from Paris-Gare de Lyon (destination Nice)
- Night trains - from Paris-Gare d'Austerlitz (destination Nice)
- Lines 03 and 06 of TER Provence-Alpes-Côte d'Azur - from Marseille-Gare Saint-Charles (destination Nice)
- TER Provence-Alpes-Côte d'Azur - local stopping service to Cannes from Les Arcs

=== Air ===
International scheduled air passenger services are available at:

Nice Côte d'Azur Airport: forty-five kilometres (28 miles).

Marseille Provence Airport: 118 km (73 mi).

Private, commercial and freight services are conducted at:

Cannes – Mandelieu Airport: twenty kilometres (12 miles).

La Môle – Saint-Tropez Airport: thirty-four kilometres (21 miles).

=== Bus ===
Saint-Raphaël is well served by bus routes, and has a busy bus station in the town centre.

Express service by LER PACA - Route 21: Aix-en-Provence to Nice.

Fast service (1 hour 15 mins) to Nice Airport by S.V.A. (Société Varoise d'Autocars)

Departement (County) services by SodeTrav (La Société Départementale des Transports du Var)
Routes 27, 28, 31, 53 and 104

Town services by AggloBus Fréjus/Saint-Raphael - Routes 1a, 3, 5, 6, 7, 8, 10.

=== Distances ===
- Fréjus: 3 km (1.9 mi)
- Agay: 11 km (6.8 mi)
- Sainte-Maxime 23 km (14 mi)
- Draguignan: 33 km (21 mi)
- Saint-Tropez: 39 km (24 mi)
- Cannes: 41 km (25 mi)
- Brignoles: 66 km (41 mi)
- Nice: 66 km (41 mi)
- Toulon: 75 km (47 mi)
- Monte Carlo: 89 km (55 mi)
- Marseilles: 111 km (69 mi)
- Montpellier: 270 km (170 mi)
- Lyon: 415 km (258 mi)
- Perpignan: 419 km (260 mi)
- Paris: 695 km (432 mi)
- Bordeaux: 605 km (376 mi)

== Sports ==
The local handball team Saint-Raphaël Var Handball has been one of the strongest in France, winning silver medals in the 2016 French Championship and in the 2018 EHF Cup.

== Notable people ==
- Melchior Treub (1851–1910),

Dutch botanist who died in Saint-Raphaël

== International relations ==
Saint-Raphaël is twinned with:

- Jermuk, Armenia
- Sankt Georgen im Schwarzwald, Germany, since 1972
- Tiberias, Israel, since 2007

== Gallery ==
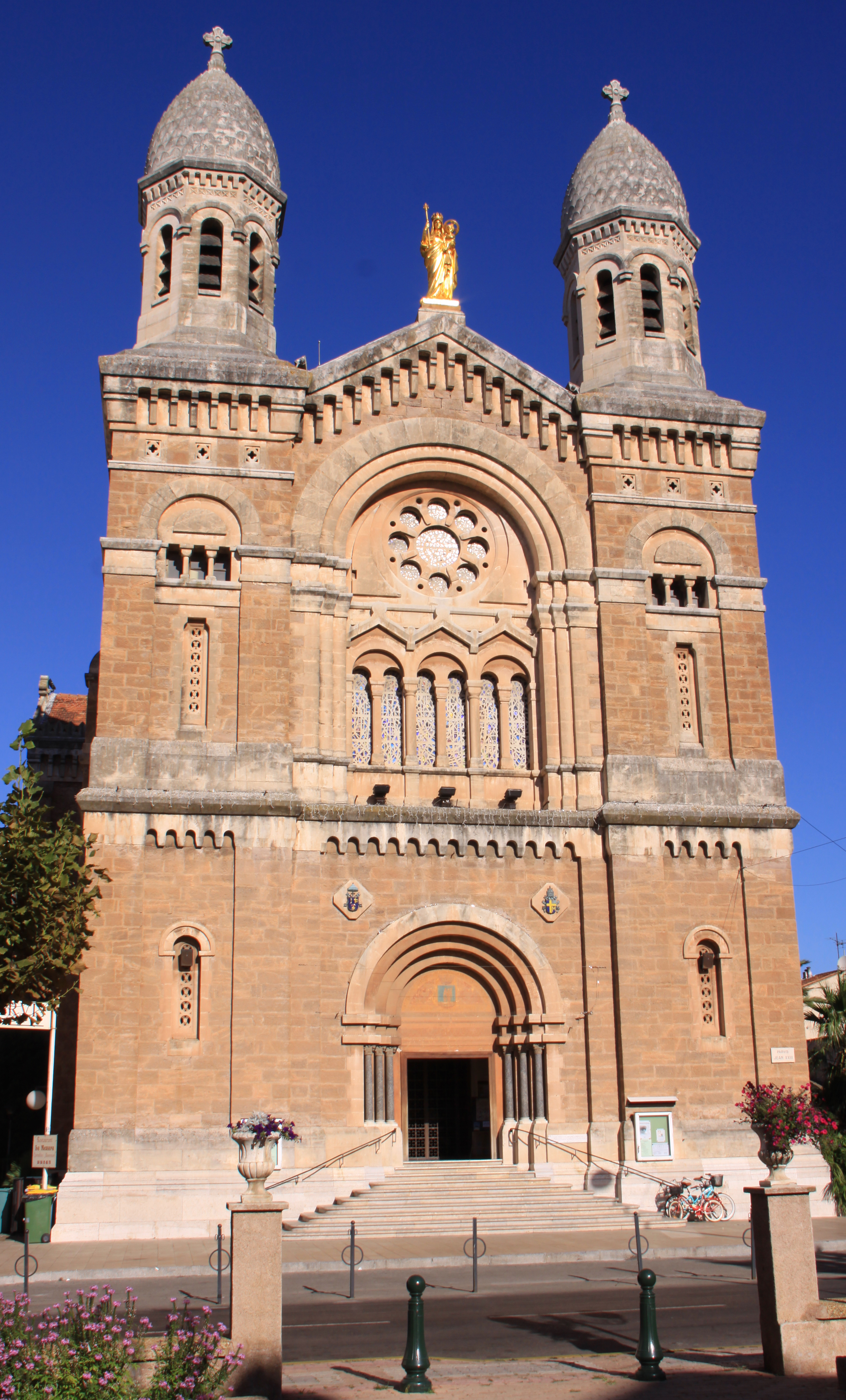
The Church Notre Dame de la Victoire.

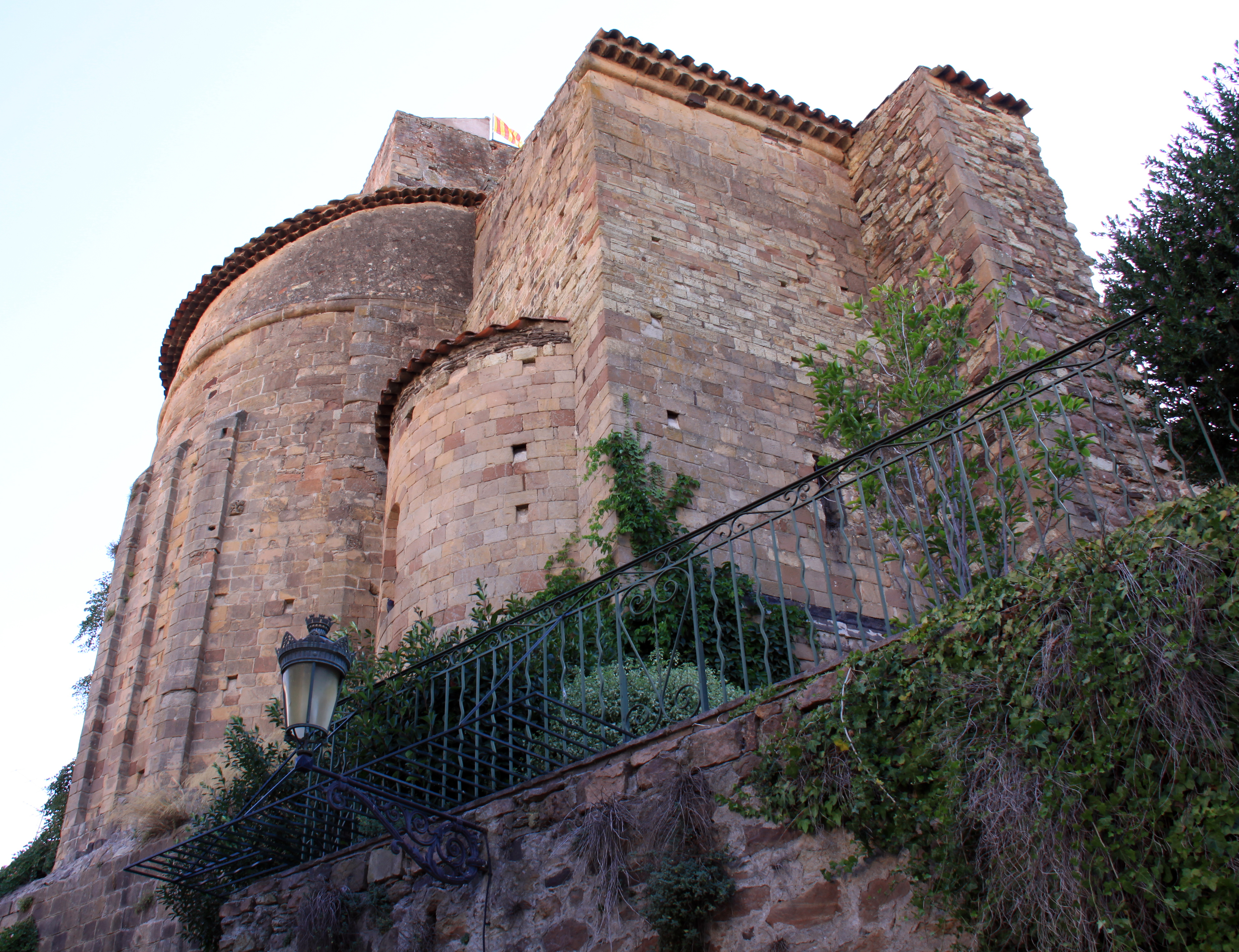
The tower built into the old church San Rafeu.

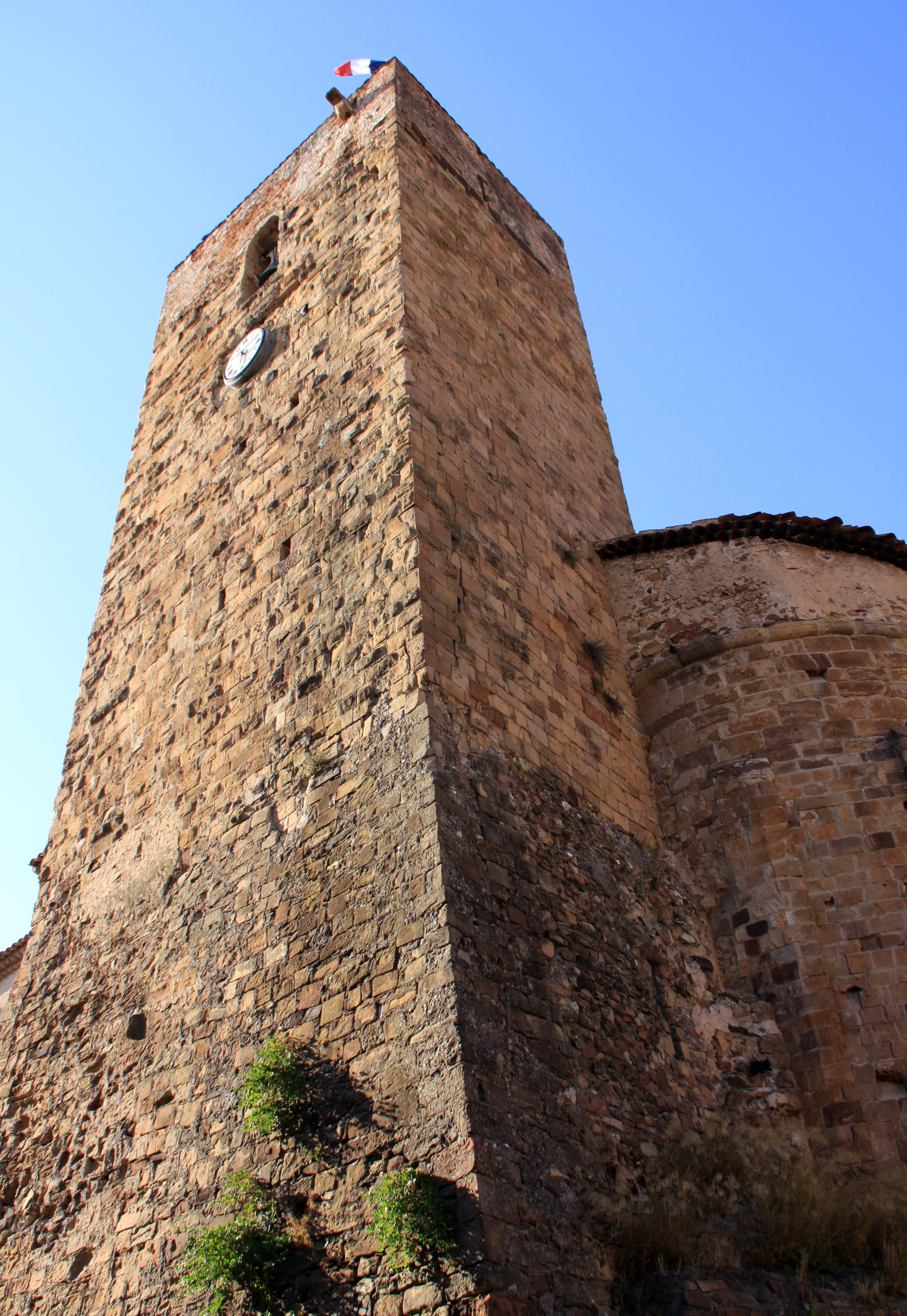
The medieval tower.

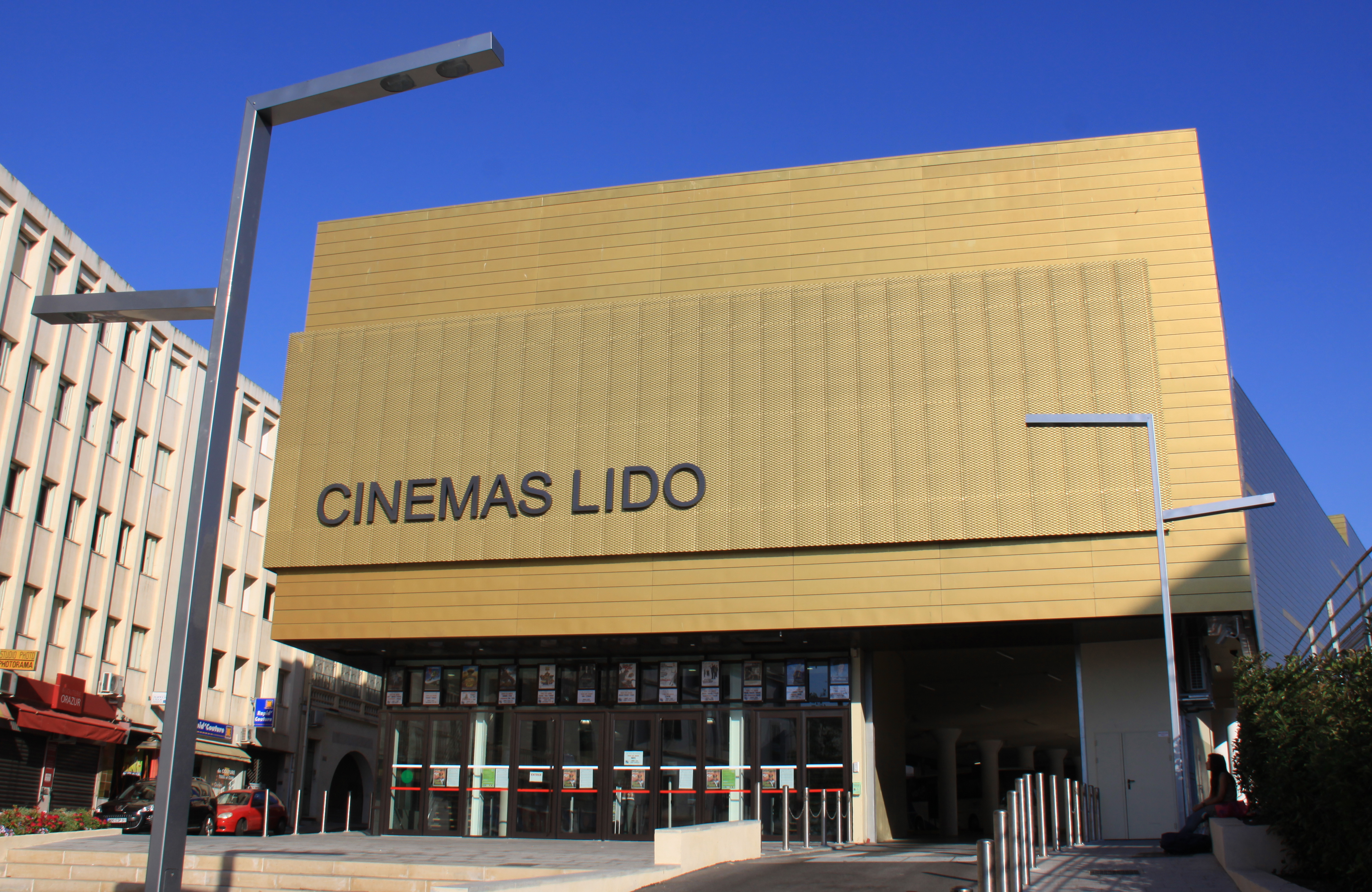
The new central bus station adjacent to the railway station (Gare SNCF).

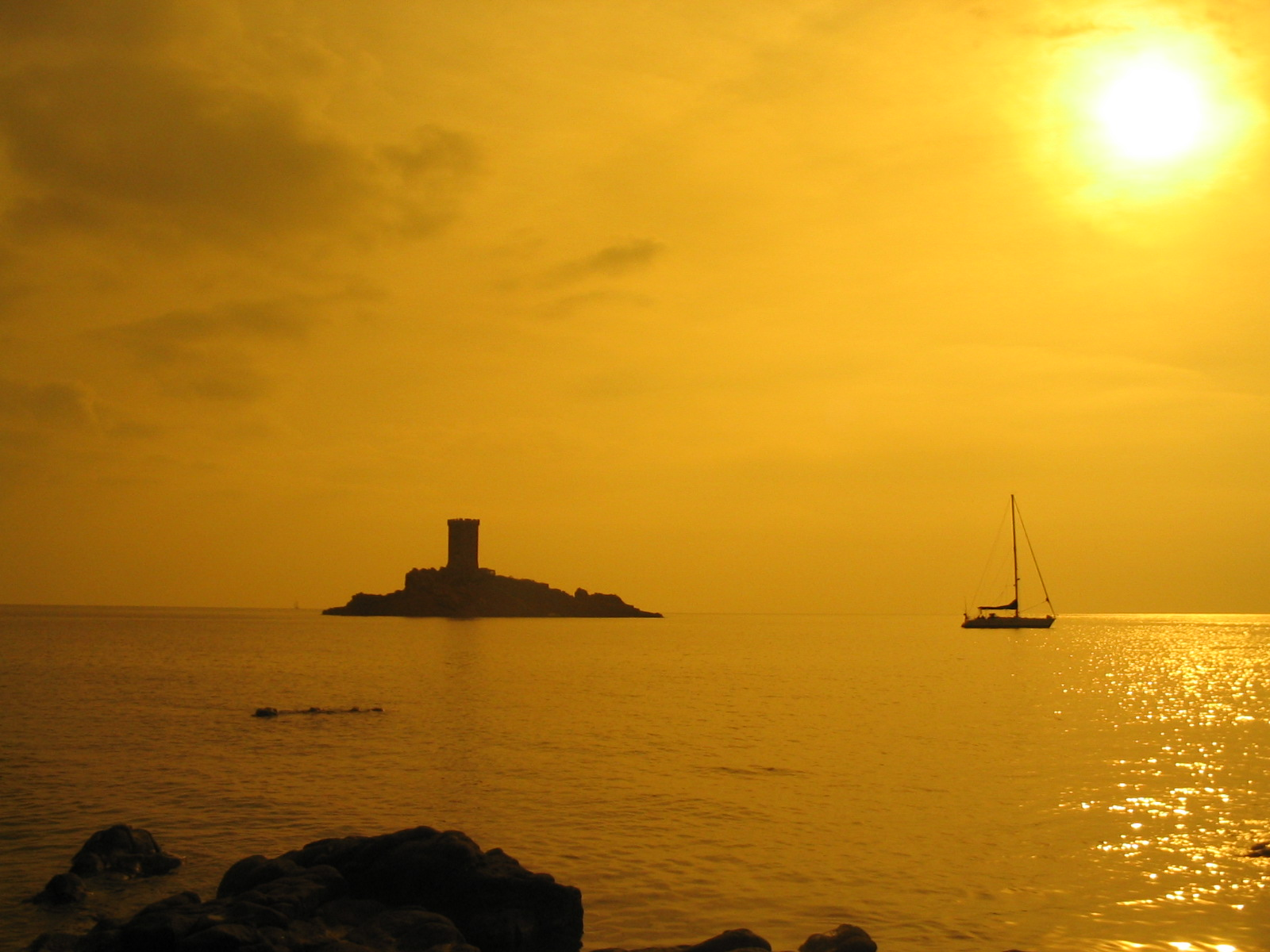
L'Ile d'Or

== See also ==
- Communes of the Var department
- Île d'Or
