= Alvania annetteae =

- Shell of Alvania annetteae (holotype at MNHN, Paris)

Scientific classification
- Kingdom: Animalia
- Phylum: Mollusca
- Class: Gastropoda
- Subclass: Caenogastropoda
- Order: Littorinimorpha
- Family: Rissoidae
- Genus: Alvania
- Species: A. annetteae

Binomial name
- Alvania annetteae van Aartsen, 1982

Species of gastropod

Alvania annetteae is a species of small sea snail, a marine gastropod mollusk or micromollusk in the family Rissoidae.

== Description ==
The length of the shell attains 3.05 mm.

== Distribution ==
This species occurs in the Mediterranean Sea off Saint Raphael, France.
