= SodeTrav =

- Parent: Keolis
- Headquarters: Hyères-les-Palmiers
- Service type: Bus and Coach services
- Routes: 6
- Fleet: 180
- Website: www.sodetrav.fr

SodeTrav (Société Départementale de Transports du Var) is a bus operating in the south of France, specifically in the Var department. The company roots date to the early 20th century and it is now owned by the French transport group Keolis.

In 2008, SodeTrav had a fleet of over 180 vehicles.

== Bus Lines ==
104

- Saint Raphael - Frejus
- Saint Aygult - Les Issambres
- Sainte Maxime - Saint Pons
- Port Grimaud - Grimaud
- Cogolin - La Foux - Saint Tropez

100

- Les Arcs - Saint Tropez
