= Estérel Côte d'Azur Agglomération =

- Communauté d'agglomération
- Interactive map of Estérel Côte d'Azur Agglomération
- Coordinates: 43°26′N 06°46′E
- Country: France
- Region: Provence-Alpes-Côte d'Azur
- Department: Var
- No. of communes: {{{nbcomm}}}
- Established: 2013
- Area: 347.1 km^{2} (134.0 sq mi)
- Population (2017): 112,812
  - Density: 325.0/km^{2} (841.8/sq mi)
- Website: esterelcotedazur-agglo.fr

Estérel Côte d'Azur Agglomération (before May 2021: Var Estérel Méditerranée) is a communauté d'agglomération, an intercommunal structure, centred on the cities of Fréjus and Saint-Raphaël. It is located in the Var department, in the Provence-Alpes-Côte d'Azur region, southeastern France. It was created in January 2013. Its seat is in Saint-Raphaël. Its population was 112,812 in 2017.

== Composition ==
The communauté d'agglomération consists of the following 5 communes:

1. Les Adrets-de-l'Estérel
2. Fréjus
3. Puget-sur-Argens
4. Roquebrune-sur-Argens
5. Saint-Raphaël
