= Canton of Saint-Raphaël =

Coordinates: 43.43°N 6.77°E

The canton of Saint-Raphaël is an administrative division of the Var department, southeastern France. Its borders were modified at the French canton reorganisation which came into effect in March 2015. Its seat is in Saint-Raphaël.

It consists of the following communes:

1. Les Adrets-de-l'Estérel
2. Fréjus (partly)
3. Saint-Raphaël
