= Île d'Or =

Island east of Saint-Raphaël, France

Coordinates: 43.410833°N 6.846667°E

Location of Île d'Or in France

The île d'Or is a private island located at the east of the city of Saint-Raphaël in France, facing the cape of Le Dramont.

This small island is composed of porphyry (russet rocks) and surmounted by a tower reminiscent of the Middle Ages said to have been the inspiration for The Black Island in Hergé's The Adventures of Tintin series. Viewed from the sea from the left side of the tower, a rock, commonly thought to resemble the profile of a gorilla, also recalls the comic books of Hergé.

The île d'Or is a "site classé" (a protected geographical formation), since 17 March 1941. The island is included with this status inside the Massif de l'Esterel since 3 January 1996.

== Gallery ==
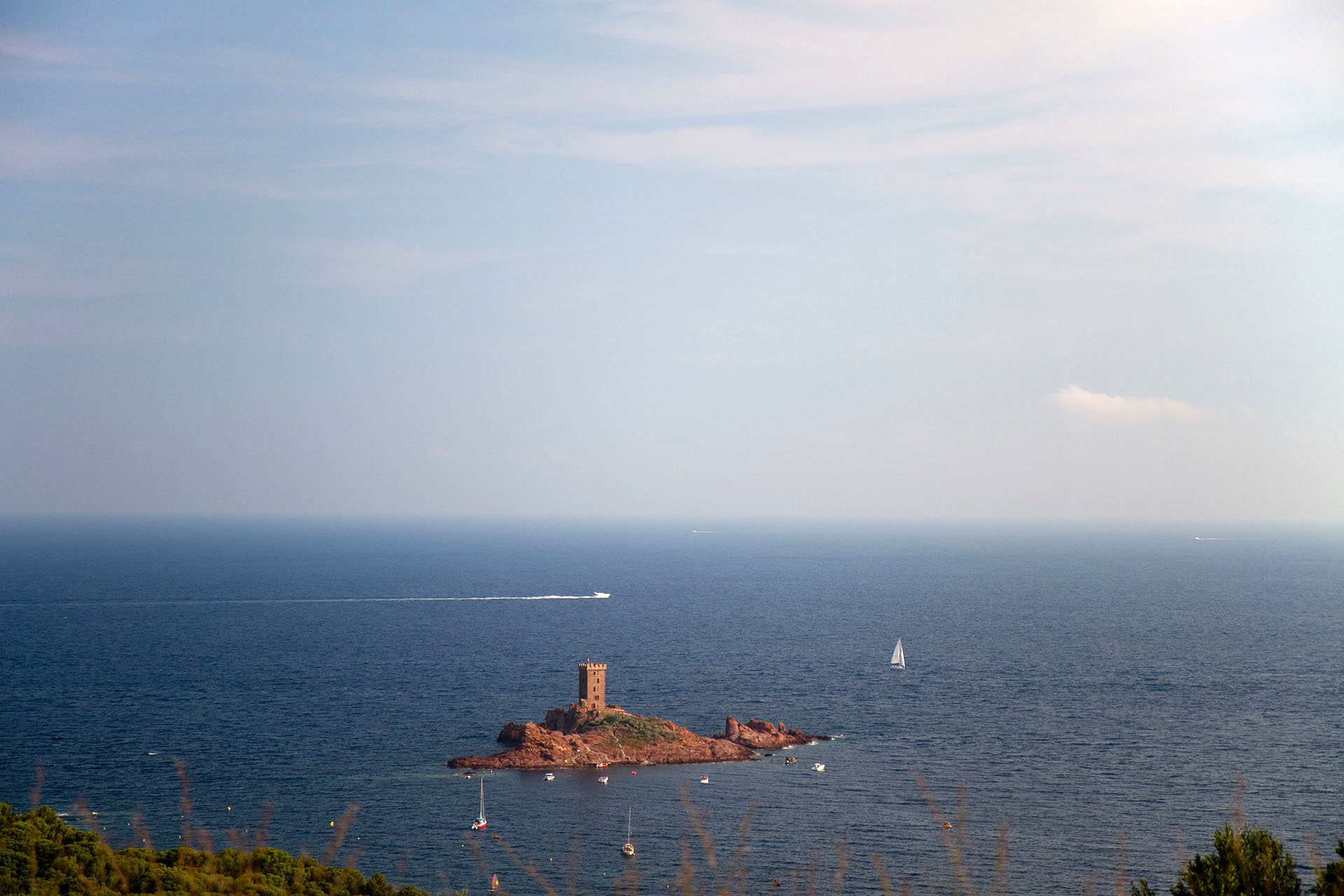
Île d'Or as seen from the village of Cap Esterel (2010)

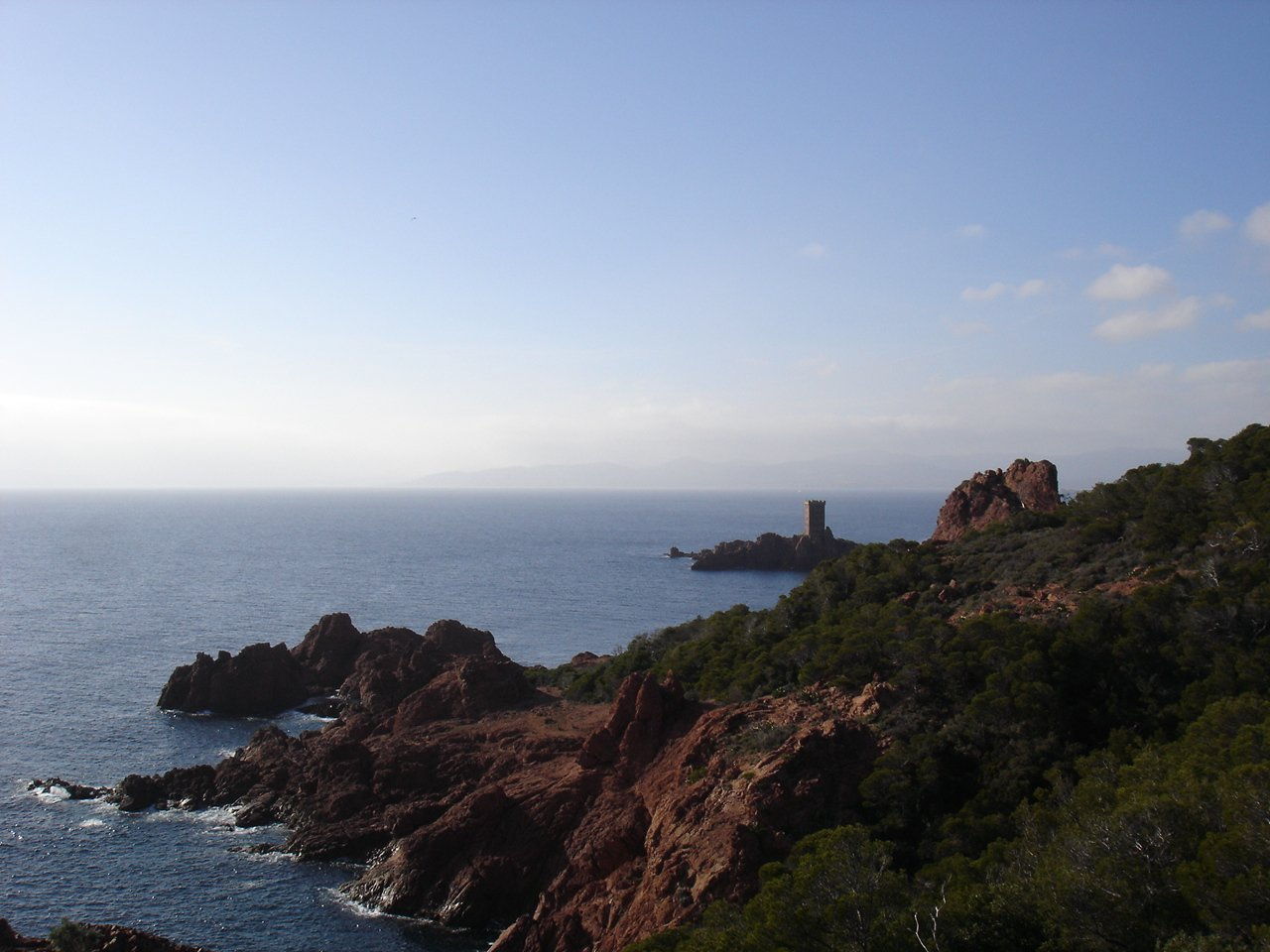
Île d'Or as seen from the east (2007)

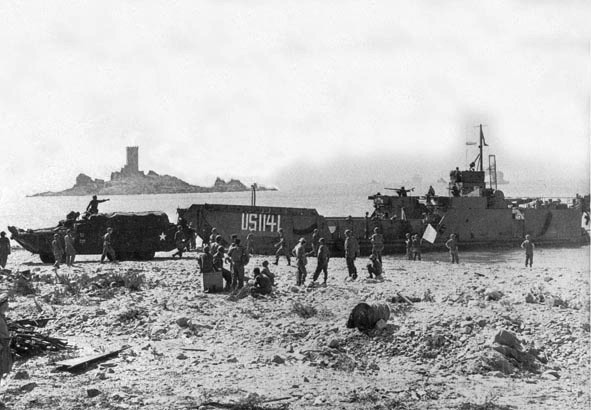
Île d'Or from the north-northwest, as American soldiers disembark a landing craft (August 1944)

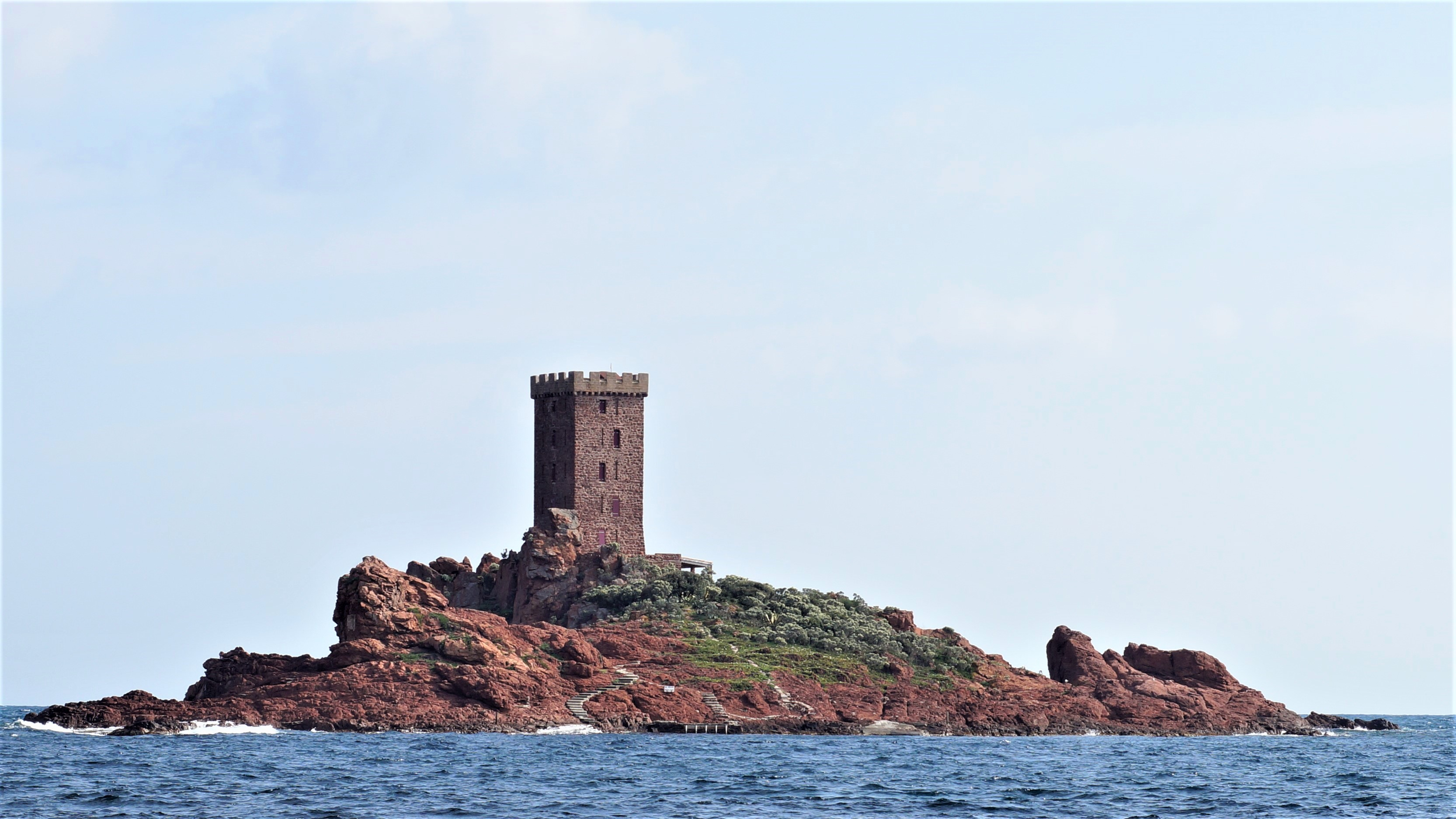
Île d’Or as seen from the northwest (2019)

== See also ==
- The îles d'Hyères, in the same region, are also called the îles d'Or (Golden islands).
