= Hôtel de Ville, Saint-Raphaël =

Town hall in Saint-Raphaël, France

Hôtel de Ville
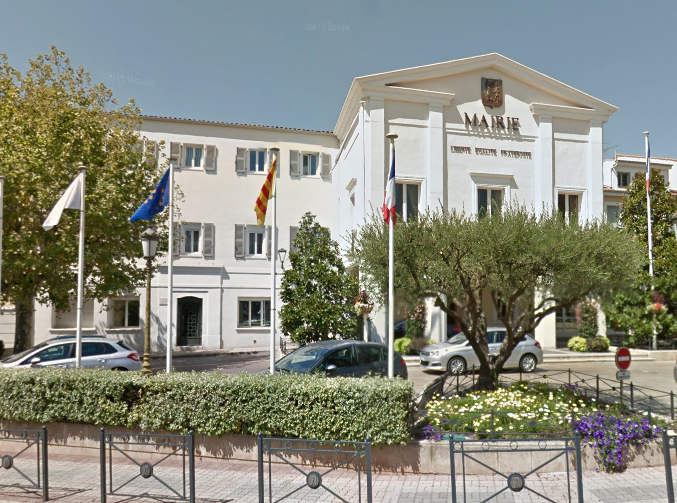
- The main frontage of the Hôtel de Ville in March 2016
- Interactive map of the Hôtel de Ville area

General information
- Type: City hall
- Architectural style: Neoclassical style
- Location: Saint-Raphaël, France
- Coordinates: 43.4252°N 6.7684°E
- Completed: 1832

Design and construction
- Architect: Esprit Lantouin

The Hôtel de Ville (French pronunciation: [otɛl də vil], City Hall) is a municipal building in Saint-Raphaël, Var, in southeastern France, standing on Place Sadi Carnot.

== History ==
Following the French Revolution, meetings of the town council were originally held in the house of the mayor at the time. This arrangement continued until 1807 when the mayor, Louis-Michel Caïs, decided to rent a building in the public square from the Perron family. The council then obtained authority from Charles X to commission a purpose-built town hall in August 1827. The new building was designed by the town architect, Esprit Lantoin, in the neoclassical style, built in brick with a stucco finish, and was officially opened by the mayor, Jean-Baptiste Doze, on 8 August 1832.

The design involved a symmetrical main frontage of three bays facing onto the public square. The central bay featured a doorway with a stone surround and a cornice. On the first floor, there was a French door with a triangular pediment and a balustraded balcony. The outer bays were fenestrated with casement windows with shutters on both floors. The doorcase was made from porphyry which was sourced locally.

The public square in front of the building, which became known as La Place de la Mairie, was filled with plane trees and benefited from the installation of a fountain in 1881. After the president of France, Sadi Carnot, was assassinated, the square was renamed Place Sadi Carnot in 1894.

During the Second World War, the Krupnik family, who lived in the town, were arrested, sent to Drancy internment camp and then transported to Auschwitz concentration camp, where they died in September 1942. Paving stones were later placed in front of the town hall to commemorate their lives. Following the success of Operation Dragoon, which involved allied landings on and around the beach at Saint-Raphaël, the town was liberated by American troops on 15 August 1944.

In the early 1980s, following significant population growth, the council led by the mayor, René-Georges Laurin, decided to enlarge the town hall. This was achieved by adding an extra floor onto the building, as well as a monumental porch to the front of it, in 1986. The porch incorporated a recessed doorway on the ground floor and featured four full-height Doric order pilasters supporting an open pediment with a coat of arms in the tympanum.

In February 2025, it was disclosed that a firm of publishers, Asterès, was using a room in the town hall to store 1,000 copies of a book written by the former president of France, Nicolas Sarkozy, entitled "Le temps des combats", in preparation for distribution.
