= Les Adrets-de-l'Estérel =

- Commune
- Coat of arms
- Location of Les Adrets-de-l'Estérel
- Location within France Location within Provence-Alpes-Côte d'Azur
- Coordinates: 43°31′15″N 6°48′38″E
- Country: France
- Region: Provence-Alpes-Côte d'Azur
- Department: Var
- Arrondissement: Draguignan
- Canton: Saint-Raphaël
- Intercommunality: Estérel Côte d'Azur Agglomération

Government
  - Mayor (2020–2026): Jean-Pierre Klinholff
- Area^{1}: 22.66 km^{2} (8.75 sq mi)
- Highest elevation: 420 m (1,380 ft)
- Lowest elevation: 60 m (200 ft)
- Population (2023): 2,775
  - Density: 122.5/km^{2} (317.2/sq mi)
- Time zone: UTC+01:00 (CET)
  - Summer (DST): UTC+02:00 (CEST)
- INSEE/Postal code: 83001 /83600
- Website: lesadretsdelesterel.fr
- ^{1} French Land Register data, which excludes lakes, ponds, glaciers > 1 km^{2} (0.386 sq mi or 247 acres) and river estuaries.

Les Adrets-de-l'Estérel (French pronunciation: [le.z‿adʁɛ də lɛsteʁɛl], literally Les Adrets of The Estérel; Occitan: Leis Adrechs, before 1962: Les Adrets-de-Fréjus) is a commune in the department of Var in the Provence-Alpes-Côte d'Azur Region of southeastern France.

It lies near Fréjus and Cannes, on the Esterel massif in southeastern France.

== Population ==
Historical population
Year	Pop.	±% p.a.
1968	361	—
1975	424	+2.32%
1982	684	+7.07%
1990	1,474	+10.07%
1999	2,063	+3.81%
2007	2,709	+3.46%
2012	2,788	+0.58%
2017	2,750	−0.27%
2023	2,775	+0.15%
Source: INSEE

== See also ==
- Communes of the Var department
