= Massif de l'Esterel =

Mountain range in France

Massif de l'Estérel
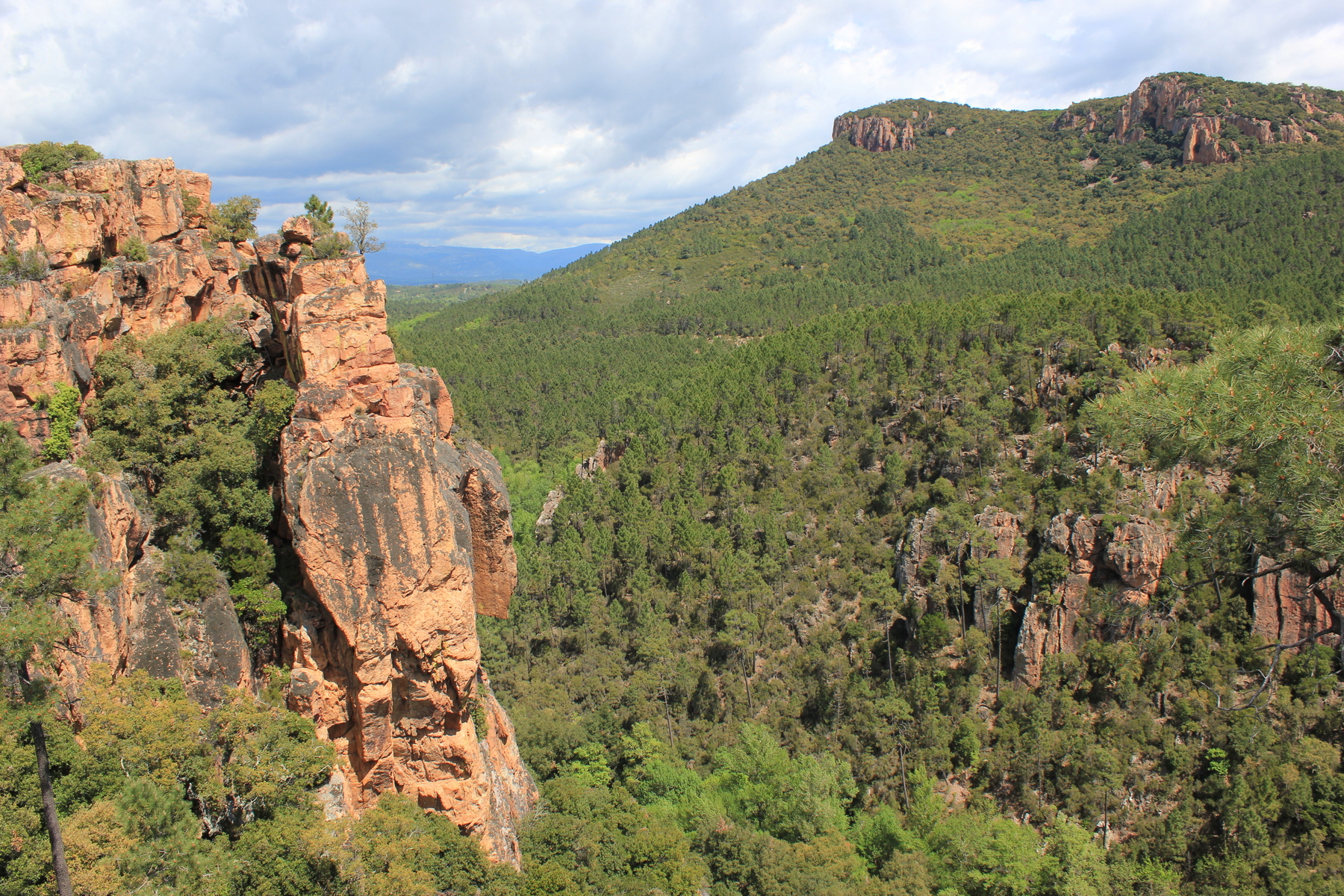
- Gorges du Blavet

Highest point
- Coordinates: 43°30′N 6°49′E

Naming
- Language of name: French

Geography
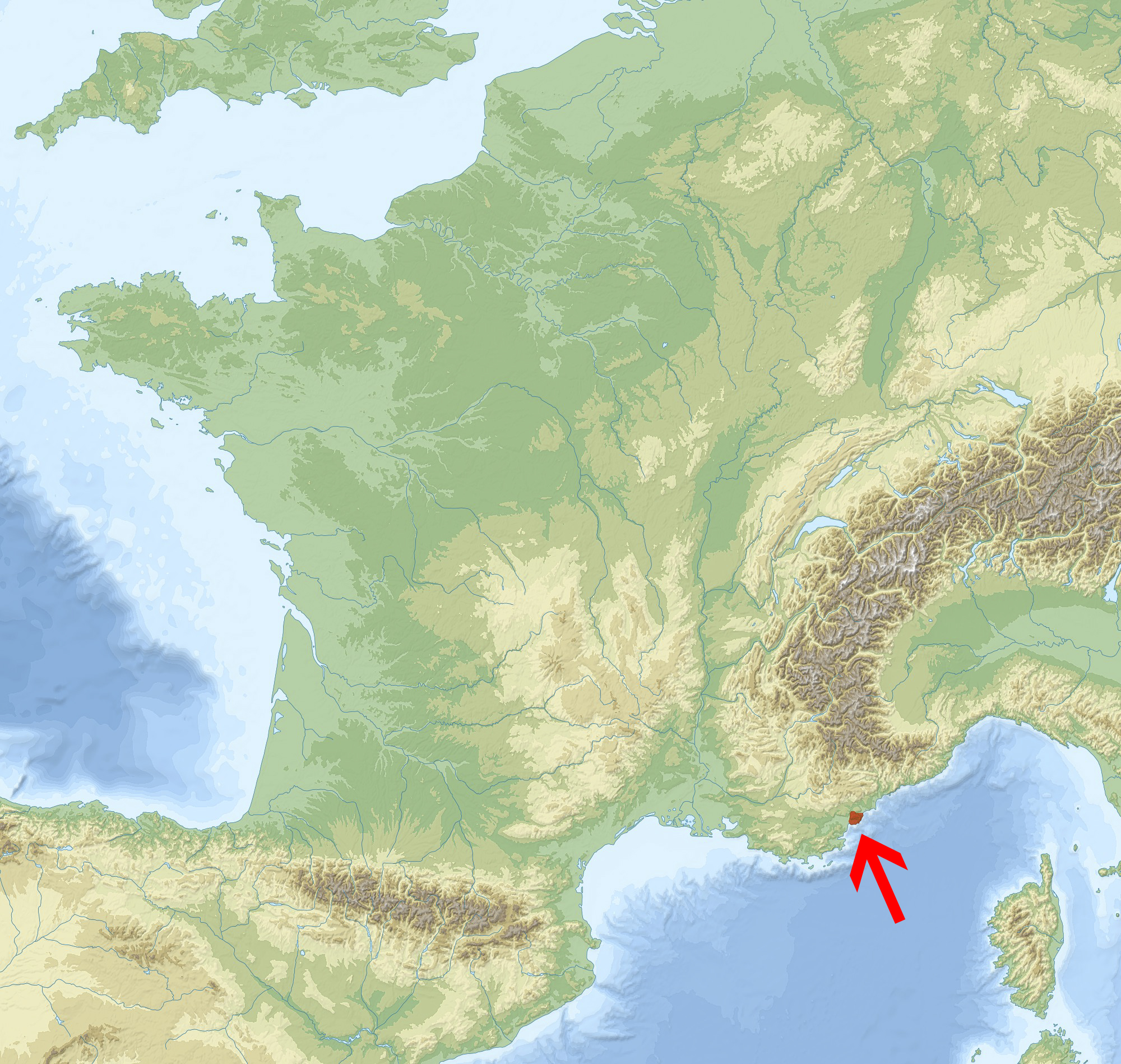

The Massif de l'Estérel (Occitan Provençal: Esterèu; English: Esterel Massif) is a Mediterranean coastal mountain range in the departments of Var and Alpes-Maritimes on the French Riviera. Neighbouring cities are Mandelieu-la-Napoule and Cannes to the east and Saint-Raphaël and Fréjus to the west.

The soil and rocks of the range are of volcanic origin, composed mainly of rhyolite, which gives the hills a red color. The terrain is rugged, with deep ravines and oak forests. The highest point of the massif is Mont Vinaigre (618 metres or 2,028 feet).

The massif covers an area of 320 km^{2} (123.5 sqmi), of which 130 km^{2} (50.1 sqmi) are protected by the Forêt domaniale de l'Esterel (national forest). The nature reserve offers hiking and mountain biking trails including the GR 49 and GR 51. The Esterel mountains also host the Pierre & Vacances holiday village Cap Esterel. The Corniche d'Or, a touristic road along the coast and Île d'Or, links Saint-Raphaël and Cannes.

== Gallery ==
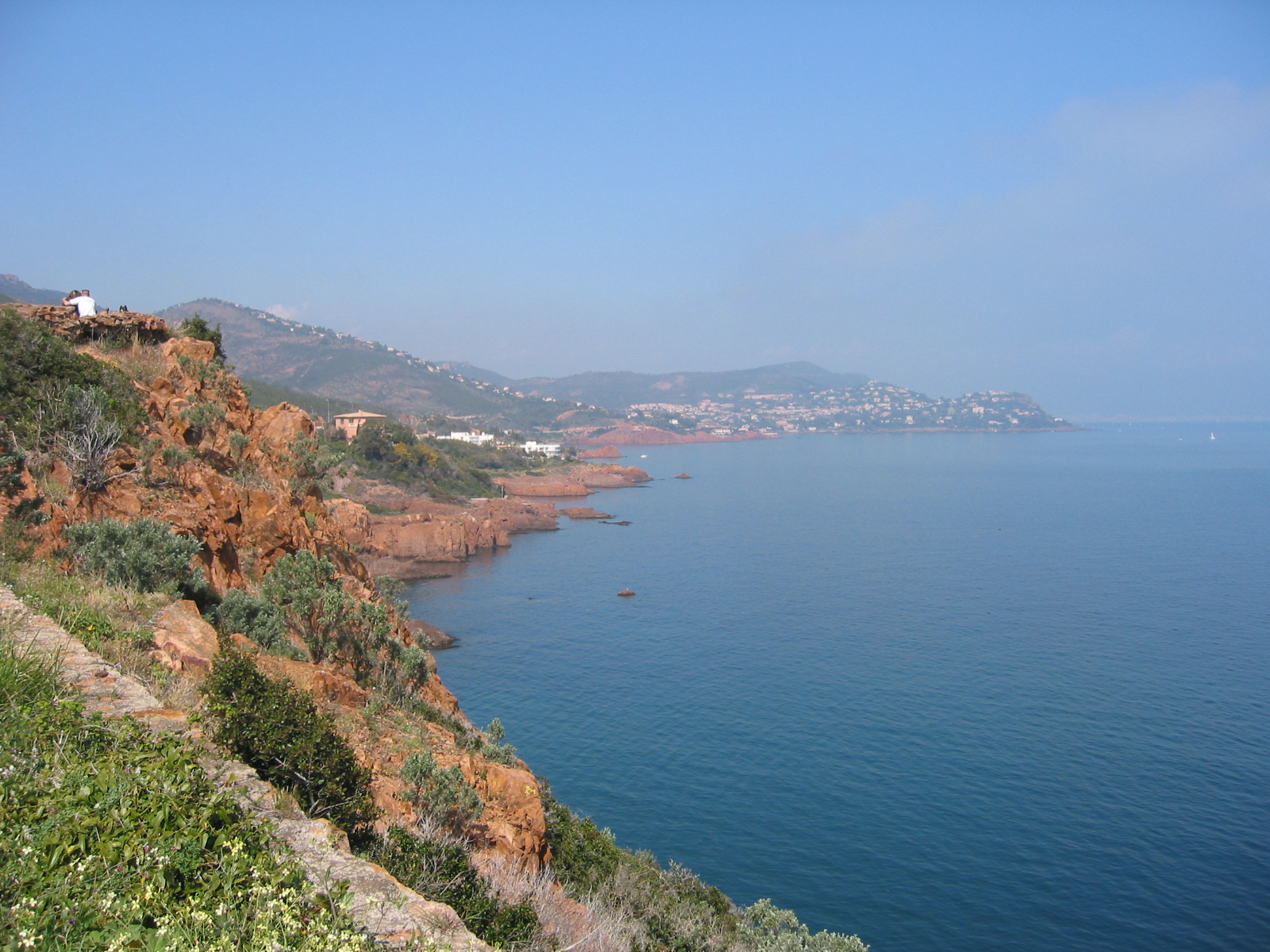
The Esterel Massif

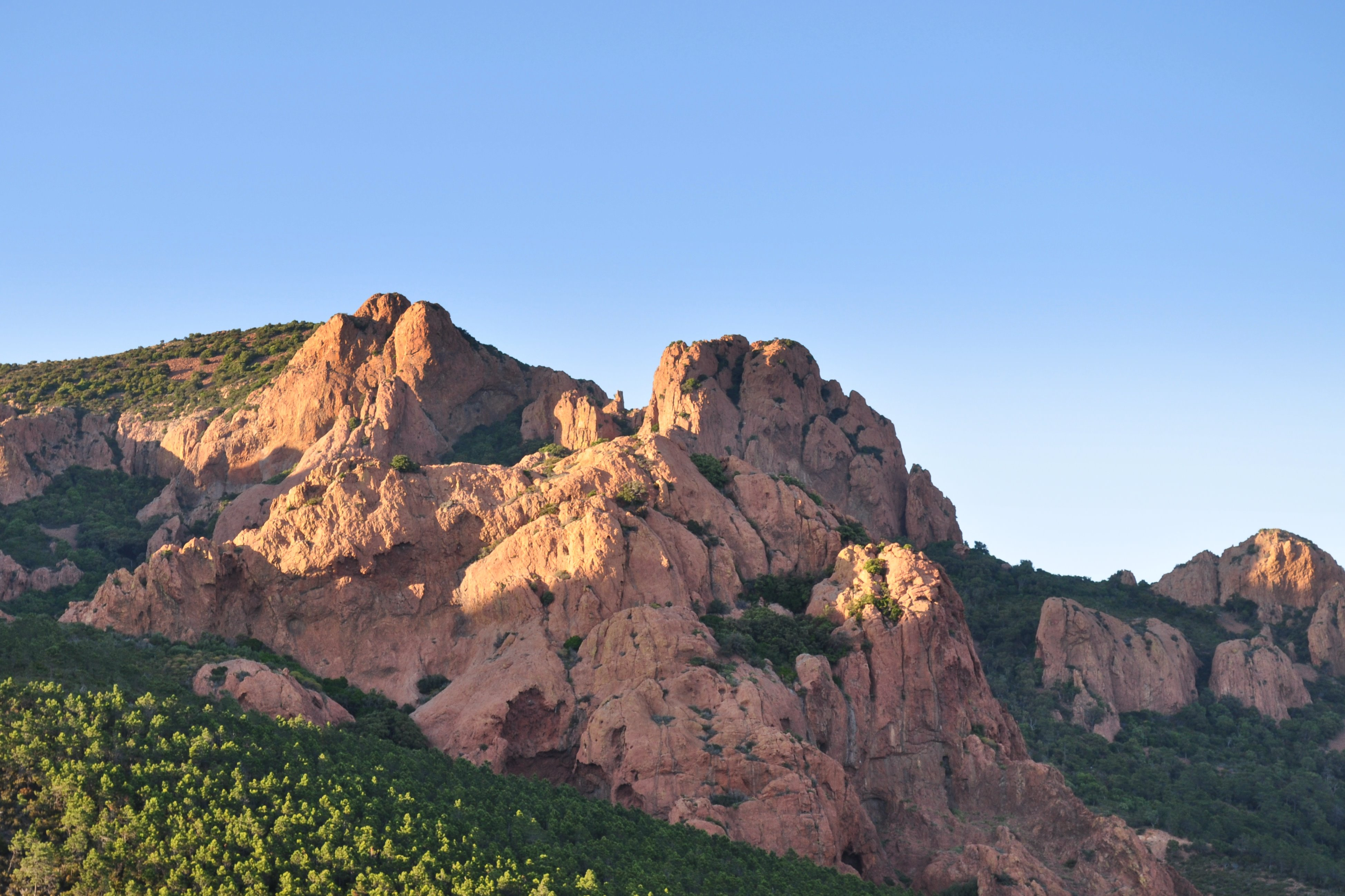
Red cliffs of Esterel

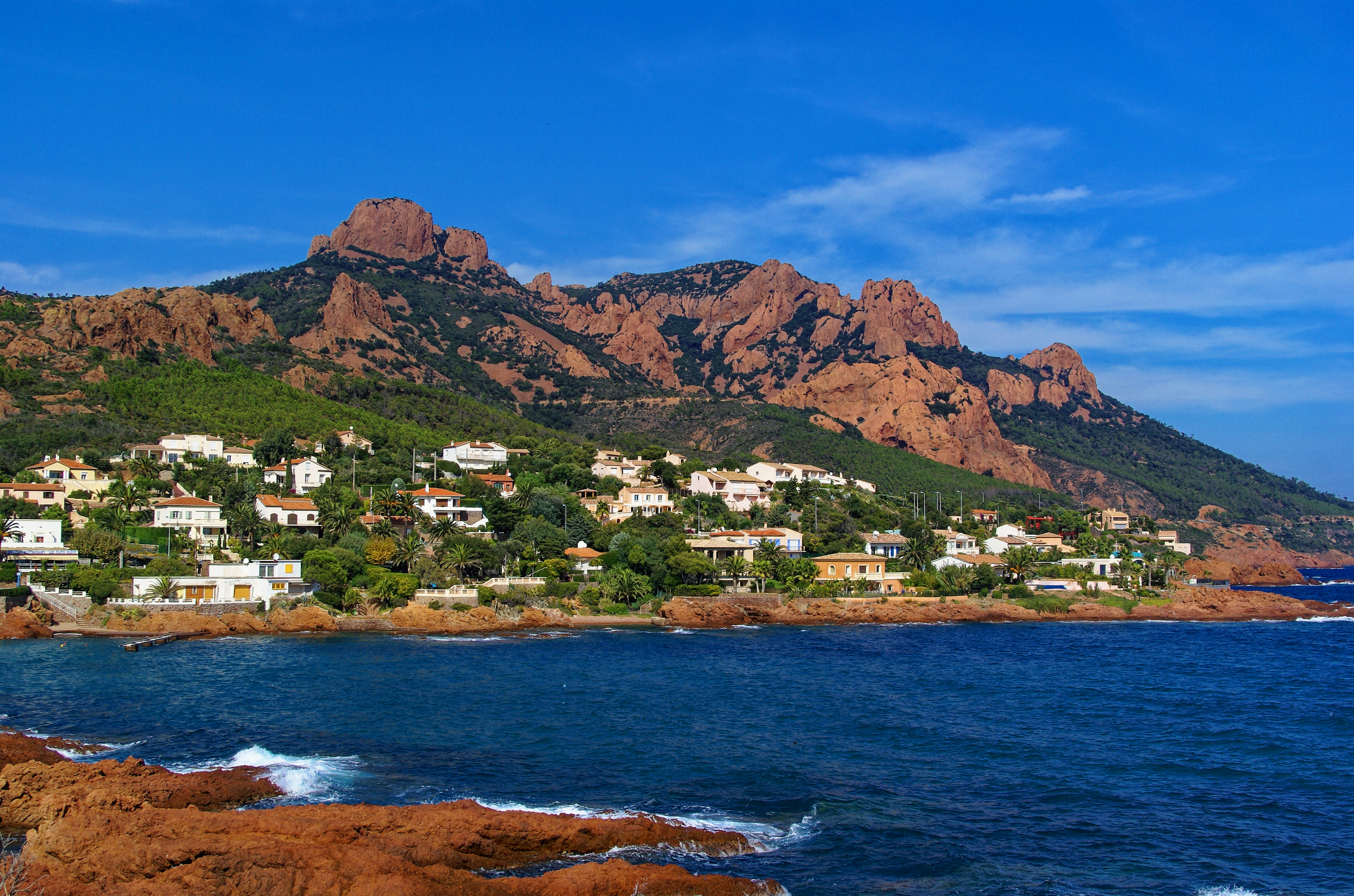
Calanque d'Anthéor

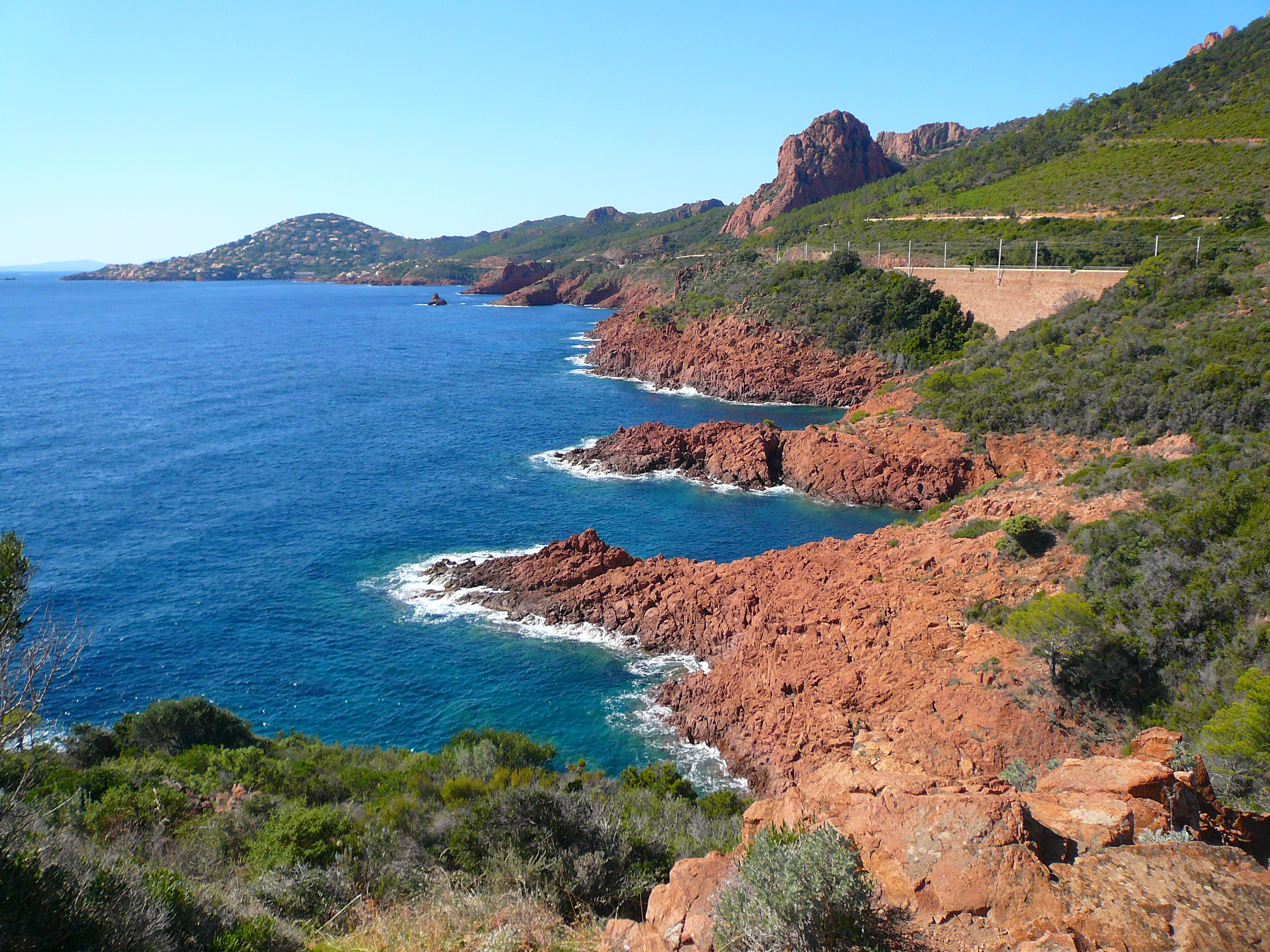
Anthéor

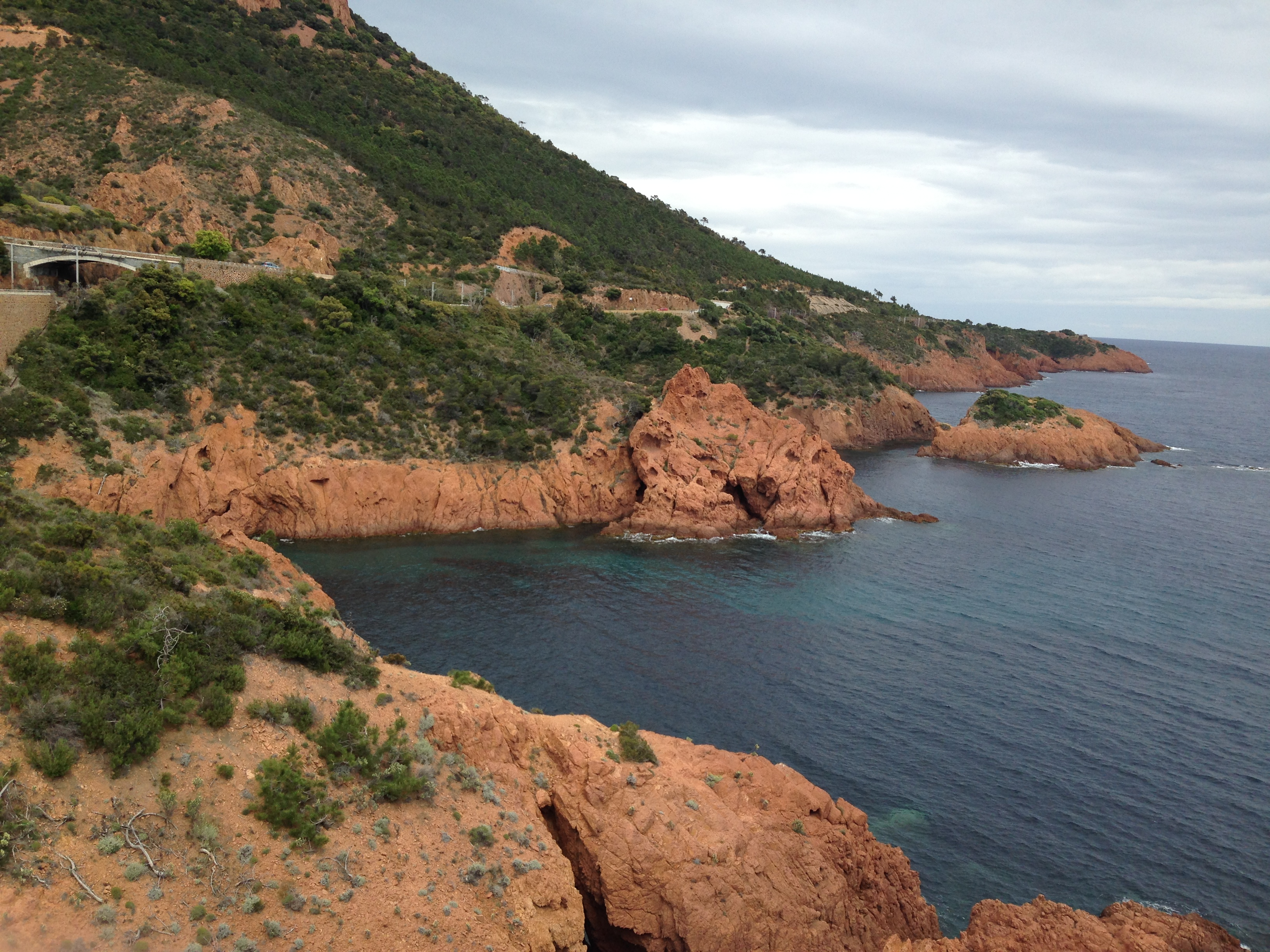
Calanque de Saint-Barthélemy

Red cliffs of Esterel
