= Puget-sur-Argens =

- Commune
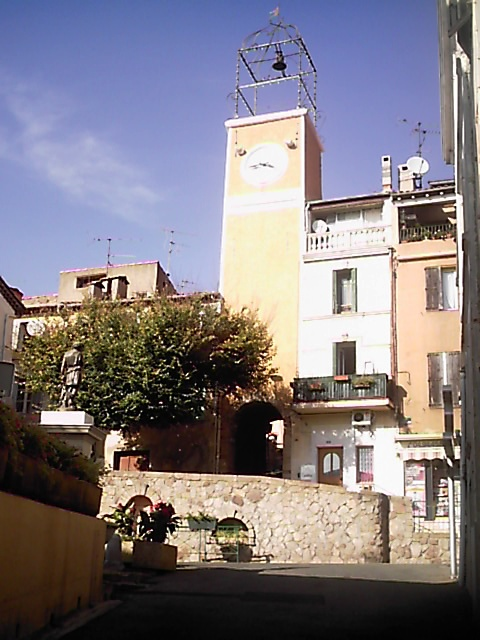
- The bell tower of Puget-sur-Argens

- Coat of arms
- Location of Puget-sur-Argens
- Location within France Location within Provence-Alpes-Côte d'Azur
- Coordinates: 43°27′23″N 6°40′58″E
- Country: France
- Region: Provence-Alpes-Côte d'Azur
- Department: Var
- Arrondissement: Draguignan
- Canton: Roquebrune-sur-Argens
- Intercommunality: Estérel Côte d'Azur Agglomération

Government
  - Mayor (2020–2026): Paul Boudoube
- Area^{1}: 26.9 km^{2} (10.4 sq mi)
- Elevation: 12 m (39 ft)
- Highest elevation: 180 m (590 ft)
- Lowest elevation: 0 m (0 ft)
- Population (2023): 8,602
  - Density: 320/km^{2} (828/sq mi)
- Time zone: UTC+01:00 (CET)
  - Summer (DST): UTC+02:00 (CEST)
- INSEE/Postal code: 83099 /83480
- ^{1} French Land Register data, which excludes lakes, ponds, glaciers > 1 km^{2} (0.386 sq mi or 247 acres) and river estuaries.

Puget, officially Puget-sur-Argens (French pronunciation: [pyʒɛ syʁ aʁʒɑ̃(s)], literally Puget on Argens; Occitan: Lo Puget d'Argenç) is a commune in the Var department in the Provence-Alpes-Côte d'Azur region in southeastern France.

It is located at 687 kilometres south-east of Paris. It is called Lo Pugeton or Lo Puget d'Argènç in Occitan and Le Petit Puget in the province to distinguish it from the city formerly more important from Puget-Ville. and is located at the crossing of the Route nationale 7 and the A8 autoroute. The population of Puget-on-Argens has multiplied by four since 1950 and many companies have come to the town. In fact, the strong demographic and economic expansion in direct periphery tends to transform the commune into a suburban residential and working area.

== Demographics ==
Its inhabitants are called Pugétois in French.

Historical population
| Year | Pop. | ±% p.a. |
|---|---|---|
| 1962 | 3,399 | — |
| 1968 | 3,033 | −1.88% |
| 1975 | 3,849 | +3.46% |
| 1982 | 4,509 | +2.29% |
| 1990 | 5,865 | +3.34% |
| 1999 | 6,371 | +0.92% |
| 2007 | 6,988 | +1.16% |
| 2012 | 6,915 | −0.21% |
| 2017 | 8,097 | +3.21% |
| 2023 | 8,602 | +1.01% |
Source: EHESS and INSEE

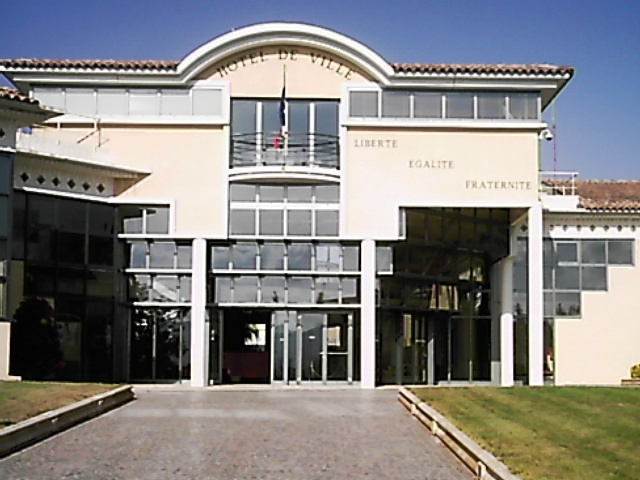
Town hall

== Climate ==
Climate data for Puget-sur-Argens
| Month | Jan | Feb | Mar | Apr | May | Jun | Jul | Aug | Sep | Oct | Nov | Dec | Year |
|---|---|---|---|---|---|---|---|---|---|---|---|---|---|
| Mean daily maximum °C (°F) | 13 (55) | 13 (55) | 15 (59) | 18 (64) | 21 (70) | 25 (77) | 28 (82) | 28 (82) | 25 (77) | 21 (70) | 16 (61) | 13 (55) | 19.6 (67.3) |
| Daily mean °C (°F) | 8 (46) | 9 (48) | 10 (50) | 13 (55) | 16 (61) | 19 (66) | 22 (72) | 22 (72) | 19 (66) | 16 (61) | 11 (52) | 8 (46) | 14.4 (57.9) |
| Mean daily minimum °C (°F) | 3 (37) | 4 (39) | 5 (41) | 7 (45) | 10 (50) | 14 (57) | 16 (61) | 16 (61) | 14 (57) | 11 (52) | 6 (43) | 3 (37) | 9.1 (48.4) |
| Average precipitation mm (inches) | 89.6 (3.53) | 85.4 (3.36) | 72.3 (2.85) | 62.1 (2.44) | 48.7 (1.92) | 37.9 (1.49) | 14.6 (0.57) | 42.6 (1.68) | 59.0 (2.32) | 117.0 (4.61) | 108.9 (4.29) | 85.6 (3.37) | 823.4 (32.42) |
| Mean monthly sunshine hours | 147.8 | 148.9 | 203.2 | 252.1 | 234.9 | 280.6 | 310.3 | 355.5 | 319.5 | 247.0 | 201.5 | 145.5 | 2,748.1 |

== See also ==
- Communes of the Var department
