= List of French-language authors =

Chronological list of French language authors (regardless of nationality), by date of birth. For an alphabetical list of writers of French nationality (broken down by genre), see French writers category.

== Middle Ages ==
- Turold (eleventh century)
- Wace (c. 1110 – c. 1180)
- Chrétien de Troyes (c. 1135 – c. 1183)
- Richard the Lionheart (Richard Coeur de Lion) (1157–1199)
- Benoît de Sainte-Maure (12th-century)
- Herman de Valenciennes (12th-century)
- Le Châtelain de Couci (d.1203)
- Jean Bodel (12th century – c. 1210)
- Conon de Béthune (c. 1150–1220)
- Geoffroi de Villehardouin (c. 1160 – c. 1213)
- Béroul (c. 1170)
- Thomas d'Angleterre (c. 1170)
- Aimeric de Peguilhan (c. 1170 – c. 1230)
- Gace Brulé (c. 1170)
- Marie de France (c. 1175)
- Gautier de Coincy (1177/8–1236)
- Gautier de Dargies (c. 1170–after 1236)
- Gautier d'Espinal († before July 1272)
- Gillebert de Berneville (fl c.1255)
- Gontier de Soignies (fl c.1180–1220)
- Guiot de Dijon (fl c.1200–30)
- Perrin d'Angicourt (fl c.1245–50)
- Jean Renart (fl. late 12th-first half of 13th century)
- Philippe de Rémi (c.1205–c1265)
- Philippe de Beaumanoir (c.1247–c1296)
- Raoul de Soissons (c.1215–1272)
- Richard de Fournival (1201– c.1260)
- Andrieu Contredit d'Arras († c.1248)
- Jehan le Cuvelier d'Arras (fl c.1240–70)
- Guillaume le Vinier (fl c.1220–45; †1245)
- Audefroi le Bâtard (fl c.1200–1230)
- Jehan Bretel (c.1200–1272)
- Jehan Erart († c.1259)
- Moniot d'Arras (fl c.1250–75)
- Robert de Clari (late twelfth century)
- Blondel de Nesle (late twelfth century)
- Robert de Boron (twelfth–thirteenth century)
- Guiot de Provins (d. after 1208)
- Bertrand de Bar-sur-Aube (late twelfth-early thirteenth century)
- Guillaume de Lorris (c.1200 – c.1238)
- Theobald IV of Champagne (1201–1253)
- Jean de Joinville ( c.1224 – c.1317)
- Rutebeuf (c.1230 – c.1285)
- Adam de la Halle (c.1250 – c.1285)
- Jean de Meung or Jean de Meun (1250 – c.1305) or Jean Clopinel or Chopinel
- Jacques Bretel (c. 1285 – c. 1310)
- Jean Le Bel (c.1290–1370)
- Colin Muset (end of thirteenth century)
- Guillaume de Machaut ( c.1300 – c.1377)
- Nicole Oresme (1325–1382)
- Philippe de Mézières (c.1327–1405)
- Jean Froissart (1333 – c.1404)
- Eustache Deschamps (c.1346 – c.1407)
- Jean Charlier called Gerson (1363–1429
- Christine de Pisan (1364–1430)
- Alain Chartier (c.1385 – c.1435)
- Jean Juvénal des Ursins (1388–1473)
- Antoine de la Sale (1388 – c.1469)
- Enguerrand de Monstrelet (c.1390 – c.1453)
- Charles, Duke of Orléans (1394–1465)

== Fifteenth century ==
- Martin Le Franc (c.1410–1461)
- Eustache Marcadé (1414–1440)
- Georges Chastellain (1415–1475)
- Olivier de la Marche (1425–1502)
- Martial d'Auvergne ( c.1430–1508)
- François Villon (c.1431–after 1463)
- Jean Michel (c.1435–1501)
- Jean Molinet (1435–1507)
- Philippe de Commines (1445–1511)
- Jean Marot (1450–1526)
- Lefèvre d'Etaples (1455–1537)
- Guillaume Crétin (Guillaume Dubois) (1460–1525)
- Octavien de Saint-Gelais (1468–1505)
- Guillaume Budé (1468–1540)
- Jean Meschinot (active from 1450 to 1490)
- Guillaume Alexis (active from 1450 to 1490)
- Jean Lemaire de Belges (1473 – c.1525)
- Pierre Gringore or Gringoire (c.1475–1538/1539)
- François Rabelais (c.1483–1553)
- Aliénor de Poitiers (fl.1484)
- Mellin de Saint-Gelais (c.1491–1558)
- Marguerite de Navarre (c.1492–1549)
- Clément Marot (c.1496–1544)

== Sixteenth century ==
=== 1500–1549 ===
- Bonaventure des Périers (c.1500–1544)
- Maurice Scève (c.1505 – c.1562)
- Michel de l'Hospital (1505–1573)
- Étienne Dolet (1509–1546)
- Jean Calvin (1509–1564)
- Hélisenne de Crenne (Marguerite Briet de Crenne) (c.1510–after 1552)
- Pierre Viret (1511–1571)
- Charles de Sainte-Marthe (1512–1555)
- Thomas Sébillet (c.1512–1589)
- Jacques Amyot (1513–1593)
- Jacques Peletier du Mans (1517–1582)
- Théodore de Bèze (1519–1605)
- Pierre de Saint-Julien de Balleure (1519–1593)
- Denis Sauvage (1520–1587)
- Noël du Fail (1520–1591)
- Pernette Du Guillet (c.1520–1545)
- Jacques Yver (1520–1570)
- Gilles de Gouberville (1521–1578)
- Pontus de Tyard or de Thiard (1521–1605)
- Joachim du Bellay (1522–1560)
- Pierre de Ronsard (1524–1585)
- Pierre Boaistuau (?–1566)
- Louise Labé (c.1526 – c.1565)
- Rémy Belleau (1528–1577)
- Étienne Pasquier (1529–1615)
- Étienne de La Boétie (1530–1563)
- Claude Fauchet (1530–1601)
- Jean Bodin (1530–1596)
- François de Belleforest (1530–1583)
- Henri Estienne (1531–1598)
- Jean Antoine de Baïf (1532–1589)
- Étienne Jodelle (1532–1573)
- Michel de Montaigne (Michel Eyquem, seigneur de Montaigne) (1533–1592)
- Jean de la Taille (c.1533/1540 – c.1617)
- Robert Garnier (1534–1590)
- Nicolas Rapin (1535–1608)
- Jacques Grévin (1538–1570)
- Olivier de Serres (1539–1619)
- Pierre Pithou (1539–1596)
- Pierre de Bourdeille, seigneur de Brantôme (1540–1614)
- Pierre de Larivey (1540–1619)
- Florent Chrestien (1540–1596)
- Pierre Charron (1541–1603)
- Guillaume de Salluste Du Bartas (1544–1590)
- Antoine du Verdier (1544–1600)
- Philippe Desportes (1546–1606)
- Pierre de L'Estoile (1546–1611)
- Jean de La Ceppède (1548–1623)
- Philippe Duplessis-Mornay (Philippe de Mornay, called Duplessis-Mornay) (1549–1623)

=== 1550–1599 ===
- Benigne Poissenot (c.1550–?)
- François d'Amboise (1550–1619)
- Odet de Turnèbe (1552–1581)
- Jean Bertaut (1552–1611)
- Théodore Agrippa d'Aubigné (1552–1630)
- François de Malherbe (1552–1630)
- Jacques Davy Du Perron (1556–1618)
- François Béroalde de Verville (1556–1626)
- Guillaume du Vair (1556–1621)
- Jean de Sponde (1557–1595)
- Maximilien de Béthune, baron de Rosny, duc de Sully (1560–1641)
- Alexandre Hardy (1560/1570 – c.1632)
- Nicolas de Montreux (1561–1608)
- Pierre Matthieu (1563–1621)
- Eustache de Refuge, seigneur de Précy et de Courcelles (1564–1617)
- Saint François de Sales (1567–1622)
- Honoré d'Urfé (1567–1625)
- Scipion Dupleix (1569–1661)
- Sylvestre de Laval (1570–1616)
- Antoine de Nervèze (c.1570–after 1622)
- Nicolas des Escuteaux (after 1570 – c.1628)
- François du Souhait (between 1570 & 1580–1617)
- Jean Ogier de Gombaud (1570–1666)
- Antoine de Balinghem (1571–1630)
- Mathurin Régnier (1573–1613)
- Nicholas Camusat (1575–1655)
- Antoine de Montchrestien (c.1575–1621)
- Henri, duc de Rohan (1579–1638)
- Saint Vincent de Paul (1581–1660)
- Jean Duvergier de Hauranne, abbé de Saint-Cyran (1581–1643)
- François Maynard (1582–1646)
- Jean-Pierre Camus (1584–1652)
- Francis Garasse (1585–1631)
- Jean de Schelandre (c.1585–1635)
- François de La Mothe-Le-Vayer (1588–1672)
- Honorat de Bueil, seigneur de Racan (1589–1670)
- Bertrand de Loque (1589)
- Théophile de Viau (1590–1626)
- Marc Gilbert de Varennes (1591–1660)
- François le Métel de Boisrobert (1592–1662)
- Antoine Gérard de Saint-Amant (1594–1661)
- Jean Chapelain (1595–1674)
- Jean Desmarets de Saint-Sorlin (1595–1676)
- René Descartes (1596–1650)
- Claude de Malleville (1597–1647)
- Vincent Voiture (1597–1648)
- Jean-Louis Guez de Balzac (1597–1684)

== Seventeenth century ==
=== 1600–1649 ===
- Nicolas de Bralion (1600–1672)
- Marin le Roy de Gomberville (1600–1674)
- Georges de Scudéry (1601–1667)
- François Tristan l'Hermite (1601–1655)
- Guy Patin (1601–1672)
- Jean de Bernieres-Louvigny (1602–1659)
- Charles Sorel (1602–1674)
- Charles Cotin (1604–1682)
- Jean Mairet (1604–1686)
- François Hédelin, abbé d'Aubignac (1604–1676)
- Pierre du Ryer (1605–1658)
- Charles Coypeau d'Assoucy (1605–1675)
- Jean François Sarrazin (1605–1654)
- Pierre Corneille (1606–1684)
- Antoine Gombaud, chevalier de Méré (1607–1685)
- Madeleine de Scudéry (1607–1701)
- Jean Rotrou (1609–1650)
- Paul Scarron (1610–1660)
- François-Eudes de Mézeray (1610–1683)
- Charles de Saint-Evremond (c.1610–1703)
- Antoine Arnauld (1612–1694)
- Isaac de Benserade (1612–1691)
- Jean François Paul de Gondi, cardinal de Retz (1613–1679)
- François de La Rochefoucauld (1613–1680)
- Gauthier de Costes, seigneur de la Calprenède (1614–1663)
- Georges de Brébeuf (1618–1661)
- Roger de Rabutin, Comte de Bussy, called Bussy-Rabutin (1618–1693)
- Cyrano de Bergerac (Hector-Savinien Cyrano de Bergerac) (1619–1655)
- Antoine Furetière (1619–1688)
- Gédéon Tallemant des Réaux (1619–1692)
- Jean de La Fontaine (1621–1695)
- Molière (Jean-Baptiste Poquelin) (1622–1673)
- Blaise Pascal (1623–1662)
- Jean Renaud de Segrais (1624–1701)
- Paul Pellisson (1624–1693)
- Thomas Corneille (1625–1709)
- Samuel Chappuzeau (1625–1701)
- Madame de Sévigné (Marie de Rabutin-Chantal, marquise de Sévigné) (1626–1696)
- Laurent Drelincourt (1626–1680)
- Jacques Bénigne Bossuet (1627–1704)
- Gabriel-Joseph de La Vergne, comte de Guilleragues (1628–1685)
- Charles Perrault (1628–1703)
- Pierre Daniel Huet (1630–1721)
- Louis Bourdaloue (1632–1704)
- Esprit Fléchier (1632–1710)
- Jacques Pradon (1632–1698)
- Madame de Villedieu (Marie-Catherine-Hortence Desjardins, marquise de Villedieu) (1632–1683)
- Madame de Lafayette (Marie-Madeleine, comtesse de La Fayette) (1634–1693)
- Pierre Thomas, sieur du Fossé (1634–1698)
- Philippe Quinault (1635–1688)
- Nicolas Boileau (1636–1711)
- Edmé Boursault (1638–1701)
- Antoinette du Ligier de la Garde Deshoulières (1638–1694)
- Nicolas Malebranche (1638–1715)
- Jean Donneau de Visé (1638–1710)
- Philippe de Courcillon, marquis de Dangeau (1638–1720)
- Claude Estiennot de la Serre (1639–1699)
- Guillaume Amfrye de Chaulieu (1639–1720)
- César Vichard de Saint-Réal (1639–1692)
- Jean Racine (1639–1699)
- Claude de Fleury (1640–1723)
- Louis Moréri (1643–1680)
- Gatien de Courtilz de Sandras (1644–1712)
- Anne de La Roche-Guilhem (1644–1707)
- Jean de La Bruyère (1645–1696)
- Pierre Le Pesant, sieur de Boisguilbert ( c.1646–1714)
- Antoine Galland (1646–1715)
- Pierre Bayle (1647–1706)
- Joseph Anthelmi (1648–1697)

=== 1650–1699 ===
- Madame d'Aulnoy (Marie-Catherine le Jumelle de Barneville, Baronne d'Aulnoy) (1651–1705)
- François de Salignac de la Mothe-Fénelon (1651–1715)
- Louis Du Four de Longuerue (1652–1733)
- Charlotte-Rose de Caumont La Force (Mademoiselle de La Force) (1650–1724)
- Louis Legendre (1655–1733)
- Jean-François Regnard (1655–1709)
- Jean Galbert de Campistron (1656–1723)
- Bernard le Bovier de Fontenelle (1657–1757)
- Louis (or Jean) de Mailly (1657–1724)
- Henri de Boulainvilliers (1658–1712)
- François Armand Gervaise (1660–1761)
- Charles Rollin (1661–1741)
- Florent Carton Dancourt (1661–1725)
- Jean-François Foucquet (1665–1741)
- Alain-René Lesage (1668–1747)
- Jacques Bouillart (1669–1726)
- Jean-Baptiste Rousseau (1670–1741)
- Jean-Baptiste Dubos (1670–1742)
- Prosper Jolyot de Crébillon (Crébillon père) (1674–1762)
- Louis de Rouvroy, duc de Saint-Simon (1675–1755)
- Jean-François Boyer (1675–1755)
- Philippe Néricault Destouches (1680–1754)
- Claudine Alexandrine Guérin de Tencin (Madame de Tencin) (1681–1749)
- Jérôme Besoigne (1686–1763)
- Marivaux (Pierre Carlet de Chamblain de Marivaux) (1688–1763)
- Alexis Piron (1689–1773)
- Montesquieu (Charles Louis de Secondat, baron de Montesquieu) (1689–1755)
- Louis Petit de Bachaumont (1690–1771)
- Voltaire (François-Marie Arouet) (1694–1778)
- René-Louis de Voyer de Paulmy, marquis d' Argenson (1694–1757)
- Françoise de Graffigny (1695–1758)
- Antoine François Prévost (Antoine Francois Prevost d'Exiles) a/k/a Abbé Prévost (1697–1763)
- Marie Anne de Vichy-Chamrond, marquise du Deffand (1697–1780)
- Denis-François Camusat (1697–1732)

== Eighteenth century ==
=== 1700–1749 ===
- Charles Pinot Duclos (1704–1772)
- Claude Prosper Jolyot de Crébillon (Crébillon, fils) (1707–1777)
- Georges-Louis Leclerc, Comte de Buffon (Georges Louis Leclerc, comte de Buffon) (1707–1788)
- Julien Offray de La Mettrie (1709–1751)
- Gabriel Bonnot de Mably (1709–1785)
- Jean-Baptiste-Louis Gresset (1709–1777)
- Jean-Jacques Lefranc, marquis de Pompignan (1709–1784)
- Charles-Simon Favart (1710–1792)
- Jean-Jacques Rousseau (1712–1778)
- Denis Diderot (1713–1784)
- Étienne Bonnot de Condillac (1714–1780)
- Marie Jeanne Riccoboni (Madame Riccoboni) (1714–1792)
- Claude Adrien Helvétius (1715–1771)
- Vauvenargues (Luc de Clapiers, marquis de Vauvenargues) (1715–1747)
- François-André-Adrien Pluquet (1716–1790)
- Jean-François de Saint-Lambert (1716–1803)
- Louis Carrogis Carmontelle (1717–1806
- Jean Le Rond d'Alembert (1717–1783)
- Michel-Jean Sedaine (1719–1797)
- Antoine Henri de Bérault-Bercastel (1720–c.1794)
- Jacques Cazotte (1720–1792)
- Denis Dominique Cardonne (1721–1783)
- Tiphaigne de la Roche (Charles-François Tiphaigne de la Roche) (1722–1774)
- Baron d'Holbach (Paul Henri Dietrich, baron d'Holbach) (1723–1789)
- Jean-François Marmontel (1723–1799)
- Casanova a/k/a Jacques Casanova de Seingalt (1725–1798)
- Anne Robert Jacques Turgot, Baron de Laune (1727–1781)
- Jean Dussaulx (1728–1799)
- Nicolas Bricaire de la Dixmerie (c.1730–1791)
- Jacqueline-Aimée Brohon (1731–1778)
- Pierre-Augustin Caron de Beaumarchais (1732–1799)
- Anne-Marie Lacroix (1732–1802)
- Jacques Clinchamps de Malfilâtre (1733–1767)
- Nicolas Edme Restif de La Bretonne (1734–1806)
- Jean-Benjamin François de la Borde (1734–1794)
- Charles Joseph, Prince de Ligne (1735–1814)
- Jacques-Henri Bernardin de Saint-Pierre (1737–1814)
- Jacques Delille (1738–1813)
- Jean-François de la Harpe (1739–1803)
- Marquis de Sade (Donatien Alphonse François de Sade) (1740–1814)
- Isabelle de Charrière a/k/a Belle de Zuylen (1740–1805)
- Pierre-Ambroise Choderlos de Laclos (1741–1803)
- Catherine Dorothée de Saint-Pierre (1743–?)
- Condorcet (Marie Jean Antoine Caritat, marquis de Condorcet) (1744–1794)
- Gabriel Brizard (c1744–1793)
- André-Samuel-Michel Cantwell (1744–1802)
- Étienne Pélabon (1745–1808)
- Jean Antoine Roucher (1745–1794)
- Jean-Sifrein Maury (Abbé Maury) (1746–1817)
- Joseph-Alexandre-Victor Hupay de Fuveau (1746–1818)
- Stéphanie Félicité Ducrest de St-Albin, comtesse de Genlis (Madame de Genlis) (1746–1830)
- Armand Louis de Gontaut, duc de Biron, duc de Lauzun (1747–1793)
- Olympe de Gouges (1748–1793)
- Pierre-Louis Ginguené (1748–1815)
- Honoré Gabriel Riqueti, comte de Mirabeau (1749–1791)
- Jean-Marie Collot d'Herbois (1749–1796)

=== 1750–1799 ===
- Georges Henri Victor Collot (1750–1805)
- Nicolas Joseph Laurent Gilbert (1751–1780)
- Évariste de Forges de Parny (1753–1814)
- Joseph de Maistre (1753–1821)
- Jean Armand Charlemagne (1753–1838)
- Marie Thérèse Péroux d’Abany (1753–1821)
- Joseph Joubert (1754–1824)
- Jean-Pierre Claris de Florian (1754–1794)
- Jacques Pierre Brissot a/k/a Jean-Pierre Brissot (1754–1793)
- Charles Maurice de Talleyrand (1754–1838)
- Constantin François de Chasseboeuf, Comte de Volney (1757–1820)
- William Vincent Barré (c.1760–1829)
- Victoire Babois (1760–1839)
- Adelaide Filleul, Marquise de Souza-Botelho (Madame de Souza) (1761–1836)
- André Chénier (1762–1794)
- Claude-François-Xavier Mercier de Compiègne (1763–1800)
- Joseph Chénier (1764–1811)
- Barbara Juliana, Baroness von Krüdener (Madame de Krüdener) (1764–1824)
- Madame de Staël (1766–1817)
- Las Cases (Emmanuel-Augustin-Dieudonné, comte de Las Cases) (1766–1842)
- Benjamin Constant (Benjamin Constant de Rebecque) (1767–1830)
- Joseph Fiévée (1767–1839)
- François-René de Chateaubriand (1768–1848)
- Étienne Pivert de Senancour (1770–1846)
- Fanny Raoul (1771–1833)
- Sophie de Renneville (1772–1822)
- Charles-Jean Baptiste Bonnin (1772–1846)
- Paul Louis Courier de Méré (1772–1825)
- René Charles Guilbert de Pixérécourt (1773–1844)
- Sophie Ristaud Cottin (Madame Cottin) (1773–1807)
- Eugène François Vidocq (1775–1857)
- Claire de Duras (Madame de Duras) (1777–1828)
- Ambroise Rendu (1778–1860)
- Charles Nodier (1780–1844)
- Pierre-Jean de Béranger (1780–1857)
- Victor de Bonald (1780–1871)
- Aimé Martin (1781–1844)
- Fanny Tercy (1782–1851)
- Félicité Robert de Lamennais (1782–1854)
- Amable Guillaume Prosper Brugière, baron de Barante (1782–1866)
- Victor Henri-Joseph Brahain Ducange (1783–1833)
- Stendhal (Henri Beyle) (1783–1842) (The Red and the Black, 1830)
- Pierre-Antoine Lebrun (1785–1873)
- Marceline Desbordes-Valmore (1786–1859)
- Alphonse Rabbe (1786–1829)
- Élise Voïart (1786–1866)
- François Guizot (1787–1874)
- Alexandre Guiraud (1788–1847)
- Alphonse de Lamartine (1790–1869)
- Victor Cousin (1792–1867)
- Charles Paul de Kock (1793–1871)
- Jean-M.-Vincent Audin (1793)
- Casimir Delavigne (Jean-François Casimir Delavigne) (1793–1843)
- François Stoepel (1794–1836)
- Rosine de Chabaud-Latour (1794–1860)
- Arthur Dinaux (1795–1864)
- Amédée Pichot (1795–1877)
- Modeste Gruau (1795–1883)
- Augustin Thierry (1795–1856)
- Zulma Carraud (1796–1889)
- François Mignet (1796–1884)
- Alfred de Vigny (1797–1863)
- Antoinette Henriette Clémence Robert (1797–1872)
- Adolphe Thiers (1797–1877)
- Auguste Comte (1798–1857)
- Eugène Delacroix (1798–1863)
- Charles Dezobry (1798–1871)
- Jules Michelet (1798–1874)
- Sophie Rostopchine, Comtesse de Ségur (1799–1874)
- Honoré de Balzac (1799–1850)

== Nineteenth century ==
=== 1800–1824 ===
- Pierre Alexandre Jean Mollière (1800–1850)
- Victor Hugo (1802–1885) (Les Misérables, 1862)
- Alexandre Dumas, père (1802–1870)
- Prosper Mérimée (1803–1870)
- Edgar Quinet (1803–1875)
- Eugène Daumas (1803–1871)
- Eugène Sue (1804–1857)
- Charles-Augustin Sainte-Beuve (1804–1869)
- Jules Janin (1804–1874)
- George Sand (Amandine-Lucie-Aurore Dupin, baronne Dudevant) (1804–1876)
- Alexis Henri Charles Clérel, comte de Tocqueville (1805–1859)
- Jules-Romain Tardieu (1805–1868)
- Émile de Girardin (1806–1881)
- Désiré Nisard (1806–1888)
- Émile Souvestre (1806–1854)
- Aloysius Bertrand (1807–1841)
- Gérard de Nerval (Gérard Labrunie) (1808–1855)
- Jules-Amédée Barbey d'Aurevilly (1808–1889)
- Jacques Claude Demogeot (1808–1894)
- Lucien de la Hodde (1808–1865)
- Frédéric Villot (1809–1875)
- Petrus Borel (1809–1859)
- Pierre-Joseph Proudhon (1809–1865)
- Xavier Forneret (1809–1884)
- Hégésippe Moreau (1810–1838)
- Maurice de Guérin (1810–1839)
- Alfred de Musset (1810–1857)
- Joseph Bouchardy (1810–1870)
- Alphonse Jolly (1810–1893)
- Pier Angelo Fiorentino (1811–1864)
- Armand de Pontmartin (1811–1890)
- Adolphe-Philippe d'Ennery (1811–1889)
- Théophile Gautier (1811–1872)
- Louis Blanc (1811–1882)
- Victor de Laprade (1812–1883)
- Louis du Couret (1812–1867)
- Eugène Bonnemère (1813–1893)
- Eugène Labiche (1815–1888)
- Joseph Arthur de Gobineau (1816–1882)
- Victor Séjour (1817–1874)
- Paul Féval, père (1817–1887)
- Adine Riom (1818–1899)
- Charles-Marie Leconte de Lisle (1818–1894)
- Eugène Despois (1818–1876)
- Jean Baptiste Marius Augustin Challamel (1818–1894)
- Adèle Hommaire de Hell (1819–1883), travel writer
- Eugène Fromentin (1820–1876)
- Émile Augier (1820–1889)
- Antoine-Élisabeth-Cléophas Dareste de la Chavanne (1820–1882)
- Jules Pizzetta (1820–1900)
- Charles Baudelaire (1821–1867) (Les Fleurs du mal, 1857)
- Gustave Flaubert (1821–1880) (Madame Bovary, 1857)
- Octave Feuillet (1821–1890)
- Jules-François-Félix Husson a/k/a Champfleury (1821–1889)
- Edmond de Goncourt (1822–1896)
- Erckmann-Chatrian (Emile Erckmann & Alexandre Chatrian) (1822–1899 & 1826–1890)
- Louis-Nicolas Ménard (1822–1901)
- Théodore de Banville (1823–1891)
- Ernest Renan (1823–1892)
- Alexandre Dumas, fils (1824–1895)

=== 1825–1849 ===
- Sainte Suzanne Melvil-Bloncourt (1825–1880)
- Jean-Félix Nourrisson (1825–1899)
- Charles De Coster (1827–1879)
- Juliette Figuier (1827–1879)
- Clair Tisseur (Nizier du Puitspelu) (1827–1896)
- Edmond About (1828–1885)
- Hyppolyte Taine (1828–1893)
- Jules Verne (1828–1905)
- Pauline Cassin Caro (1828/34/35 – 1901)
- Zénaïde Fleuriot (1829–1890)
- Numa-Denis Fustel de Coulanges (1830–1889)
- Jules de Goncourt (1830–1870)
- Hector Malot (1830–1907)
- Henri Rochefort (1830–1913)
- Henri Meilhac (1831–1897)
- Victorien Sardou (1831–1908)
- Valérie Simonin (1831–1919)
- Marguerite Tinayre (1831–1895)
- Émile Gaboriau (1832–1873)
- Jules Vallès (1832–1885)
- Gaston Lavalley (1834–1922)
- Claire Julie de Nanteuil (1834–1897)
- Édouard Pailleron (1834–1899)
- Ludovic Halévy (1834–1908)
- Jean-Marie Déguignet (1834–1905)
- Amélie Gex (Dian de la Jeânna) (1835–1883)
- Félix Narjoux (1836–1891)
- Jules Simon Troubat (1836–1914)
- Constant Fouard (1837–1903)
- Henry Becque (1837–1899)
- Auguste Villiers de l'Isle-Adam (1838–1889)
- Lucie Boissonnas (1839–1877)
- Sully Prudhomme (1839–1907)
- Jules Lermina (1839–1913)
- Alphonse Daudet (1840–1897)
- Émile Zola (1840–1902)
- Arvède Barine (1840–1908)
- Jules Claretie (1840–1913)
- Catulle Mendès (1841–1909)
- Charles Cros (1842–1888)
- Stéphane Mallarmé (1842–1898)
- José María de Heredia (1842–1905)
- François Coppée (1842–1908)
- Albert Sorel (1842–1906)
- René de Lespinasse (1843–1922)
- Paul Arène (1843–1896)
- Paul Verlaine (1844–1896)
- Anatole France (Anatole François Thibault) (1844–1924)
- Tristan Corbière (Edouard-Joachim) (1845–1875)
- Comte de Lautréamont (Isidore Lucien Ducasse) (1846–1870)
- Léon Bloy (1846–1917)
- Auguste Edgard Dietrich (1846)
- Henri François Marion (1846–1896)
- Geoffroi Jacques Flach (1846–1919)
- Brada (writer) (1847–1938)
- Émile Faguet (1847–1916)
- Joris-Karl Huysmans (1848–1907)
- Octave Mirbeau (1848–1917)
- Georges de Peyrebrune (1848–1917)
- Ferdinand Brunetière (1849–1906)
- Jean Richepin (1849–1926)
- Georges de Porto-Riche (1849–1930)

=== 1850–1859 ===
- Guy de Maupassant (1850–1893)
- Pierre Loti (Julien Viaud) (1850–1923)
- Gyp (1850–1932)
- Germain Nouveau (1851–1920)
- Élémir Bourges (1852–1925)
- Paul Bourget (1852–1935)
- Alfred Masson-Forestier (1852–1912)
- Maurice Rollinat (1853–1903)
- Arthur Rimbaud (1854–1891), Une Saison en Enfer
- Alphonse Allais (1854–1905)
- Hermine Lecomte du Noüy (1854–1915)
- Laurent Tailhade (1854–1919)
- Georges Rodenbach (1855–1898)
- Jean Lorrain (1855–1906)
- Émile Verhaeren (1855–1916)
- Adolphe Chenevière (1855–1917)
- Noël Valois (1855–1915)
- Marie Lion (1855–1922)
- Jean Moréas (Jean Papadiamantopoulos) (1856–1910)
- Pierre Decourcelle (1856–1926)
- Claude Ferval (1856–1943)
- Emmanuel Arene (1856-1908) Emmanuel Arène
- Gustave Lanson (1857–1934)
- Albert Samain (1858–1900)
- Jules Lemaître (1858–1915)
- Remy de Gourmont (1858–1915)
- Émile Durkheim (1858–1917)
- Alfred Capus (1858–1922)
- Georges Courteline (Georges Moineaux) (1858–1929)
- Neel Doff (1858–1942)
- Jean-Baptiste Chautard (1858–1935)
- Henri Danoy (1859–1928)
- Gustave Belot (1859–1929)
- Paul Naudet (1859–1929)
- Anatole Le Braz (1859–1926)
- Gustave Kahn (1859–1936)
- Henri Bergson (1859–1941)

=== 1860–1869 ===
- Jules Laforgue (1860–1887)
- Paul Margueritte (1860–1918)
- Michel Zévaco (1860–1918)
- Paul Roux a/k/a Saint-Pol-Roux le Magnifique (1861–1940)
- Paul Adam (1862–1920)
- Georges Darien (1862–1921)
- Georges Feydeau (1862–1921)
- Maurice Barrès (1862–1923)
- Maurice Maeterlinck (1862–1949)
- Stuart Merrill (1863–1915)
- Marguerite Audoux (1863–1937)
- Jules Renard (1864–1910)
- Henri de Régnier (1864–1936)
- Léon Broutin (fl. 1865–77)
- Maurice Leblanc (1864–1941)
- Juliette Heuzey (1865–1952)
- Romain Rolland (1866–1944)
- Tristan Bernard (1866–1947)
- Fortunat Strowski (1866–1952)
- Charles de Beaupoil, comte de Saint-Aulaire (1866–1954)
- Émile Lauvrière (1866–1954)
- René Boylesve (René Tardivaux) (1867–1926
- Jehan Rictus (Gabriel Randon) (1867–1933)
- Léon Daudet (1867–1942)
- Marcel Schwob (1867–1905)
- Paul-Jean Toulet (1867–1920)
- Romain Coolus (1868–1952)
- Edmond Rostand (1868–1918)
- Gaston Leroux (1868–1927) (The Phantom of the Opera, Le Mystère de la chambre jaune)
- Achille Essebac (1868–1936)
- Francis Jammes (1868–1938)
- Émile Auguste Chartier a/k/a "Alain" (1868–1951)
- Paul Claudel (1868–1955)
- André Spire (1868–1966)
- Gaston Arman de Caillavet (1869–1915)
- Augustin Chaboseau (1868–1946)
- André Gide (1869–1951)

=== 1870–1879 ===
- Marcelle Tinayre (1870–1948)
- Henry Bordeaux (1870–1963)
- Pierre Louÿs (Pierre Louis) (1870–1925)
- Maximilien Winter (1871–1935)
- André Chéradame (1871–1948)
- Albert Geouffre de Lapradelle (1871–1955)
- Gaston Brière (1871–1962)
- Marcel Proust (1871–1922), In Search of Lost Time
- Paul Valéry (1871–1945)
- Louis Madelin (1871–1956)
- Henry Bataille (1872–1922)
- Robert de Flers (1872–1927)
- Paul Fort (1872–1960)
- Alfred Jarry (1873–1907)
- Charles Péguy (1873–1914)
- Henri Barbusse (1873–1935)
- Colette (Sidonie Gabrielle Colette) (1873–1954)
- Alice Jouenne (1873–1954)
- Pierre Souvestre (1874–1914)
- Albert Thibaudet (1874–1936)
- Tristan Klingsor (1874–1966)
- Binet-Valmer (1875–1940)
- Paul Watrin (1876–1950)
- Anna de Noailles (Anne de Brancovan, comtesse de Noailles) (1876–1933)
- Max Jacob (1876–1944)
- Léon-Paul Fargue (1876–1947)
- Pierre Albert-Birot (1876–1967)
- Marcel Bouteron (1877–1962)
- Raymond Roussel (1877–1933)
- Oscar Venceslas de Lubicz-Milosz (1877–1939)
- Charles Ferdinand Ramuz, dit C. F. Ramuz (1878–1947)
- Victor Segalen (1878–1919)
- Henry de Monfreid (1879–1974)
- Francis Picabia (1879–1953)
- Henri Fauconnier (1879–1973)

=== 1880–1889 ===
- Louis Hémon (1880–1913)
- Guillaume Apollinaire (Wilhelm Apollinaris de Kostrowitzky) (1880–1918)
- Lucie Delarue-Mardrus (1880–1945)
- Francis de Miomandre (Francis Durand) (1880–1959)
- Alzir Hella (1881–1953)
- Valery Larbaud (1881–1957)
- Roger Martin du Gard (1881–1958)
- Camille Drevet (1881–1969)
- André Salmon (1881–1969)
- Jérôme Carcopino (1881–1970)
- Louis Pergaud (1882–1915)
- Jean Giraudoux (1882–1944)
- André Billy (1882–1971)
- Pierre MacOrlan (Pierre Dumarchais) (1883–1970)
- Rose Combe (1883–1932)
- Marie Noël (1883–1933)
- Auguste Detœuf (1883–1947)
- Albert Pauphilet (1884–1948)
- Jules Supervielle (1884–1960
- Gaston Bachelard (1884–1962)
- Georges Duhamel (1884–1966)
- Jacques Chardonne (Jacques Boutelleau) (1884–1968)
- Jean Paulhan (1884–1968)
- Alexandre Arnoux (1884–1973)
- Georges Ribemont-Dessaignes (1884–1974)
- René Hubert (1885–1954)
- Sacha Guitry (1885–1957)
- André Maurois (Emile Herzog) (1885–1967)
- Fernand Crommelynck (1885–1970)
- Jules Romains (Jules-Louis de Farigoule) (1885–1972)
- Marthe Bibesco (1885–1973)
- Alain-Fournier (Henri Fournier) (1886–1914)
- Francis Carco (François Carcopino-Tusoli) (1886–1958)
- Pierre Benoit (1886–1962)
- Geneviève Fauconnier (1886–1969)
- Roland Dorgelès (Roland Lecavelé) (1886–1973)
- Jean-Charles Roman d'Amat (1887–1976)
- Henri Pourrat (1887–1959)
- Jean de La Varende (Jean-Balthazar Mallard, comte de La Varende) (1887–1959)
- René Maran (1887–1960)
- Blaise Cendrars (1887–1961)
- François Mauriac (1887–1970)
- Saint-John Perse (Alexis Léger) (1887–1975)
- Pierre-Jean Jouve (1887–1976)
- Marcel Martinet (1887–1944)
- Georges Bernanos (1888–1948)
- Henri Bosco (1888–1976)
- Paul Morand (1888–1976)
- Marcel Jouhandeau (1888–1979)
- Jacques de Lacretelle (1888–1985)
- Tristan Derème (1889–1941)
- Pierre Reverdy (1889–1960)
- Jean Cocteau (1889–1963)
- Émile Henriot (1889–1961)

=== 1890–1899 ===
- Henriette Sauret (1890–1976)
- Maurice Genevoix (1890–1980)
- Victor Serge (1890–1947)
- Leilah Mahi (1890–1932)
- Édouard Dunglas (1891–1952)
- La Mazille (1891–1984)
- Max Ernst (1891–1976)
- Pierre Drieu La Rochelle (1893–1945)
- Edmond Brazès (1893–1980)
- Luc Benoist (1893–1980)
- Paul Foulquié (1893–1983)
- Claude Cahun (Lucy Schwob) (1894–1954)
- Louis-Ferdinand Céline (Louis Destouches) (1894–1961) (Voyage au bout de la nuit, 1932)
- Rose Celli (1895–1982)
- Paul Éluard (Eugène Grindel) (1895–1952)
- Jean Giono (1895–1970)
- Marcel Pagnol (1895–1974)
- Albert Cohen (1895–1981)
- Antonin Artaud (1896–1948)
- André Breton (1896–1966)
- Henry de Montherlant (Henry Millon de Montherlant) (1896–1972)
- Paulette Nardal (1896–1995)
- Tristan Tzara (1896–1963)
- Elsa Triolet (1896–1970)
- Louis Aragon (1897–1982)
- Georges Bataille (1897–1962)
- Joë Bousquet (1897–1950)
- Philippe Soupault (1897–1990)
- Marcel Thiry (1897–1977)
- Eugène Dabit (1898–1936)
- Michel de Ghelderode (1898–1962)
- Joseph Kessel (1898–1979)
- Paul Vialar (1898–1996)
- Louise Noëlle Malclès (1899–1977)
- Roger Vitrac (1899–1952)
- Pierre Virion (1899–1988)
- Jacques Audiberti (1899–1965)
- Marcel Achard (1899–1974)
- Louis Guilloux (1899–1980)
- Henri Michaux (1899–1984)
- Marcel Arland (1899–1986)
- Marcelle Auclair (1899–1983)
- Armand Salacrou (1899–1989)
- Francis Ponge (1899–1988)

== Twentieth century ==
=== 1900–1909 ===
- Antoine de Saint-Exupéry (1900–1944)
- Robert Desnos (1900–1945)
- Jacques Prévert (1900–1977)
- André Chamson (1900–1983)
- André Dhôtel (1900–1991)
- Albert Ayguesparse (1900–1996)
- Julien Green (1900–1998)
- Nathalie Sarraute (1900–1999)
- Amadou Hampâté Bâ (1900 or 1901–1991)
- Georges Limbour (1900–1970)
- Marcel Sendrail (1900–1976)
- Jacques Bordiot (1900–1983)
- Maurice Féaudierre (1901-1992)
- Jean Meuvret (1901–1971)
- Jean-Joseph Rabearivelo (1901–1937)
- Jean Prévost (1901–1944)
- Henri Daniel-Rops (Henri Petiot) (1901–1965)
- Lanza del Vasto (1901–1981)
- Charles Lecocq (1901–1922)
- Michel Leiris (1901–1990)
- Suzanne Lilar (1901–1992)
- André Malraux (1901–1976)
- Marcel Aymé (1902–1967)
- Fernand Braudel (1902–1985)
- Marie-Magdeleine Carbet (1902–1996)
- Julien Torma (1902–1933)
- Louise de Vilmorin (1902–1969)
- Vercors (pseudonym for Jean Bruller) (1902–1991)
- Jean Tardieu (1903–1995)
- Raymond Radiguet (1903–1923)
- Irène Némirovsky (1903–1942)
- Jean Follain (1903–1971)
- Georges Simenon (1903–1989)
- Raymond Queneau (1903–1976)
- Marguerite Yourcenar (Marguerite de Crayencour) (1903–1987)
- René Bansard (1904–1971)
- Marie-Anne Desmarest (1904–1973)
- Gilbert Lely (1904–1985)
- Yves Congar (1904–1995)
- Jean-Paul Sartre (1905–1980)
- Maurice Fombeure (1906–1981)
- Charles Exbrayat (1906–1989)
- Samuel Beckett (1906–1989)
- René Sédillot (1906–1999)
- Léopold Sédar Senghor (1906–2001)
- Roger Vailland (1907–1965)
- Pauline Réage (Anne Desclos) (1907–1998)
- Violette Leduc (1907–1972)
- Raymond Abellio (Georges Soulès) (1907–1986)
- René Char (1907–1988)
- Maurice Blanchot (1907–2003)
- René Ménil (1907–2004)
- Roger Peyrefitte (1907–2000)
- Roger Gilbert-Lecomte (1907–1943)
- Jacques Roumain (1907–1944)
- René Daumal (1908–1944)
- Simone de Beauvoir (1908–1986)
- Paul Bénichou (1908–2001)
- Robert Merle (1908–2004)
- Simone Weil (1909–1943)
- Stéphane Pizella (1909–1970)
- Jean-Marie Dallet (1909–1972)
- Anaïs Nin (1909–1977)
- Jean-Fernand Brierre (1909–1993)
- Robert Brasillach (1909–1945)
- André Pieyre de Mandiargues (1909–1991)
- Léo Malet (1909–1996)

=== 1910–1919 ===
- Jean Anouilh (1910–1987)
- Jean-Louis Baghio'o (1910–1994)
- Jean Genet (1910–1986)
- Paul Guth (1910–1997)
- Julien Gracq (Louis Poirier) (1910–2007)
- Emil Cioran (1911–1995)
- Raphaël Tardon (1911–1967)
- André Hardellet (1911–1974)
- René Barjavel (1911–1985)
- Guy des Cars (Guy de Pérusse des Cars) (1911–1993)
- Hervé Bazin (Jean Hervé-Bazin) (1911–1996)
- Jean Cayrol (1911–2005)
- Henri Troyat (Lev Tarassov) (1911–2007)
- André Jardin (1912–1996)
- Pierre Boulle (1912–1994)
- Edmond Jabès (1912–1991)
- Eugène Ionesco (1912–1994)
- Jacques de Bourbon Busset (1912–2001)
- Armand Robin (1912–1961)
- Luc Dietrich (1913–1944)
- Albert Camus (1913–1960)
- Mouloud Feraoun (1913–1962)
- Gilbert Cesbron (1913–1979)
- Armand Lanoux (1913–1983)
- Pierre Daninos (1913–2005)
- Claude Simon (1913–2005)
- Aimé Césaire (1913–2008)
- Albert Cossery (1913–2008)
- Félicien Marceau (Louis Carette) (1913–2012)
- Romain Gary (Romain Kacew a/k/a Romain Gary a/k/a Emile Ajar) (1914–1980)
- Béatrix Beck (1914–2008)
- Marguerite Duras (Marguerite Donnadieu) (1914–1996)
- Ahmed Sefrioui (1915–2004)
- Roland Barthes (1915–1980)
- Suzanne Césaire (1915–1966)
- Louis Dollot (1915–1997)
- Joseph Zobel (1915–2006)
- Virgil Gheorghiu (1916–1992)
- Jean-Louis Curtis (Louis Laffitte) (1917–1995)
- Ambroise Yxemerry (1917–2013)
- Pierre Bettencourt (1917–2006)
- Alain Guy (1918–1998)
- Maurice Druon (1918–2009)
- Michel Quoist (1918–1997)
- Jean Venturini (1919–1940)
- Alain Bosquet (Anatole Bisk) (1919–1998)
- Jacques Laurent a/k/a Jacques Laurent-Cely or Cécil Saint-Laurent (1919–2000)
- Michel Déon (1919–2016)
- Robert Pinget (1919–1997)

=== 1920–1929 ===
- Jean Dutourd (1920–2011)
- Jean Lartéguy (1920–2011)
- Jean Madiran (1920–2013)
- Mohammed Dib (1920–2003)
- Boris Vian (1920–1959)
- Françoise d'Eaubonne (1920–2005)
- Albert Memmi (1920–2020)
- Georges Brassens (1921–1981)
- Gérald Neveu (1921–1960)
- André Rogerie (1921–2014)
- Michel Guiomar (1921–2013)
- Jean-Pierre Renouard (1922–2014)
- Antoine Blondin (1922–1990)
- Jean-Charles (1922–2003)
- Jean-Claude Renard (1922–2002)
- Stefan Wul (1922–2003)
- Alain Robbe-Grillet (1922–2008)
- Yves Bonnefoy (1923–2016)
- Roger Foulon (1923–2008)
- Georges Perros (1923–1978)
- Ousmane Sembène (1923–2007)
- Jean Dumont (1923–2001)
- Claude Paillat (1924–2001)
- André du Bouchet (1924–2003)
- Salvat Etchart (1924–1985)
- Michel Tournier (1924–2016)
- Philippe Jaccottet (1925–2021)
- Roger Nimier (1925–1962)
- Jean d'Ormesson (1925–2017)
- François Augiéras (1925–1971)
- Alphonse Boudard (1925–2000)
- Roger Giroux (1925–1973)
- Frantz Fanon (1925–1961)
- Jean-Pierre Faye (1925–2026)
- Jean Robieux (1925–2012)
- Robert Misrahi (1926–2023)
- Yvon Taillandier (1926–2018)
- Michel Foucault (1926–1984)
- Michel Butor (1926–2016)
- Jacques Dupin (1927–2012)
- Gisèle Halimi (1927–2020)
- François Nourissier (1927–2011)
- Robert Fossier (1927–2012)
- Renada-Laura Portet (1927–2021)
- Jacques Rivette (1928–2016)
- André Schwarz-Bart (1928–2006)
- Édouard Glissant (1928–2011)
- Kateb Yacine (1929–1989)
- Nicolas Bouvier (1929–1998)

=== 1930–1939 ===
- Jacques Lafaye (1930–2024)
- Maggi Lidchi-Grassi (1930–...)
- Françoise Mallet-Joris (1930–2016)
- Fernand Ouellette (1930–2026)
- Jacques Ehrmann (1931–1972)
- Fernando Arrabal (1932–...)
- Mongo Beti (1932–2001)
- Hédi Bouraoui (1932–...)
- Claude Pujade-Renaud (1932–2024)
- Jacques Roubaud (1932–2024)
- Julienne Salvat (1932–2019)
- Marcelin Pleynet (1933–...)
- Huguette Bouchardeau (1935–2026)
- Claude Esteban (1935–2006)
- Ágota Kristóf (1935–2011)
- Françoise Sagan (Françoise Quoirez) (1935–2004)
- Daniel Zimmermann (1935–2000)
- Assia Djebar (1936–2015)
- Frankétienne (1936–2025)
- Jean-Edern Hallier (1936–1997)
- Georges Perec (1936–1982)
- Marie Rouanet (1936–2026)
- Philippe Sollers (1936–2023)
- Alain Grée (1936–2025)
- Anne-Marie Albiach (1937–2012)
- Marc Alyn (1937–2025)
- Pierre Billon (1937–...)
- Andrée Brunin (1937–1993)
- Hélène Cixous (1937–...)
- Maryse Condé (1934–2024)
- Abdelkebir Khatibi (1938–2009)
- Daniel Oster (1938–1999)
- Sandra Jayat (1930–2025)
- Michèle Lesbre (1939–...)
- Kenizé Mourad (1939–...)
- Gérard Roubichou (1939–...)

=== 1940–1949 ===
- Annie Ernaux (1940–...)
- Marie-Reine de Jaham (1940–...)
- J.M.G. Le Clézio (1940–...)
- Emmanuel Hocquard (1940–2019)
- Charles Duchaussois (1940–1991)
- Bernard Brizay (1941–...)
- Louis Mélennec (1941–...)
- Jean Daive (1941–...)
- Julia Kristeva (1941–...)
- Jean Marcel (1941–2019)
- François Weyergans (1941–2019)
- Josaphat-Robert Large (1942–2017)
- François-Xavier Guerra (1942–2002)
- Wladimir Troubetzkoy (1942–2009)
- Jean Bernabé (1942–2017)
- Jean-Patrick Manchette (1942–1995)
- Guy Olivier Faure (1943–...)
- Christian Gailly (1943–2013)
- Yves Manglou (1943–...)
- Eva Joly (1943–...)
- René-Louis Baron (1944–2016)
- Noëlle Châtelet (1944–...)
- Doumbi Fakoly (1944–2024)
- Jean-Jacques Greif (1944–...)
- Sergio Kokis (1944–...)
- Daniel Pennac (1944–...)
- Lucien Polastron (1944–...)
- Marc Filloux (1944–1974)
- Alain Guillerm (1944–2005)
- Françoise Chandernagor (1945–...)
- Tony Duvert (1945–2008)
- Bernard Gheur (1945–...)
- Pierre Michon (1945–...)
- Gisèle Bienne (1946–...)
- Renaud Camus (1946–...)
- Djémil Kessous (1946–...)
- Tahar Ben Jelloun (1947–...)
- Daniel Maximin (1947-...)
- Luc Perino (1947–...)
- Michel Étiévent (1947–2021)
- Loïc Le Ribault (1947–2007)
- Jean-Claude Villain (1947–...)
- Élisabeth Vonarburg (1947–...)
- Jean-Pierre Poccioni (1948–...)
- André Rouillé (1948–2025)
- Bertrand Le Gendre (1948–...)
- Jean-Paul Goux (1948–...)
- Serge Duigou (1948–...)
- François Leperlier (1949–...)
- Amin Maalouf (1949–...)
- Didier Daeninckx (1949–...)
- Pierre Bergounioux (1949–...)
- Boualem Sansal (1949–...)

=== 1950–present ===
- Bernard Bonnejean (1950–...)
- Yolande Cohen (1950–...)
- Jean-Paul Dubois (1950–...)
- Moussa Konaté (1951–2013)
- Salim Jay (1951–...)
- Bernard Cottret (1951–2020)
- Jean-Didier Urbain (1951–...)
- Raphaël Confiant (1951–...)
- Carole Achache (1952–2016)
- Pierre-Henri Bunel (1952–...)
- Dan Franck (1952–...)
- Dany Laferrière (1953–...)
- Françoise Bettencourt Meyers (1953–...)
- Nancy Huston (1953–...)
- Patrick Chamoiseau (1953–...)
- François Bon (1953–...)
- Martina Wachendorff (1953–...)
- Édouard Brasey (1954–...)
- Paul Dirmeikis (1954–...)
- Tahar Djaout (1954–1993)
- Margaret Maruani (1954–2022)
- Dai Sijie (1954–...)
- Pascale Roze (1954–...)
- Adelina Yzac (1954–...)
- Jean-Pierre Vallotton (1955–...)
- Alexandra Lapierre (1955–...)
- Caroline Lamarche (1955–...)
- Bertrand Renard (1955–...)
- Joël Henry (journalist) (1955–...)
- Renaud Girard (1955–...)
- Yasmina Khadra (1955-...)
- Florence Cadier (1956–...)
- Annie Pietri (1956–...)
- Charles Mopsik (1956–2003)
- Gisèle Pineau (1956–...)
- Jean-Pierre Thiollet (1956–...)
- Khal Torabully (1956–...)
- Fred Vargas (1957-...)
- Hervé Le Tellier (1957–...)
- Youssef Rzouga (1957–...)
- Jean-Philippe Toussaint (1957–...)
- Azouz Begag (1957–...)
- Didier Ottinger (1957–...)
- Olivier Da Lage (1957–...)
- Simon Basinger (1957–...)
- Michel Houellebecq (1958–...)
- Pierre Leroux (1958-...)
- Marc-Édouard Nabe (1958–...)
- Olivier Weber (1958–...)
- Denis Robert (1958–...)
- Benjamin Sehene (1959–...)
- Christine Angot (1959–...)
- Frédéric-Yves Jeannet (1959–...)
- Jean-Luc Bitton (1959–...)
- Malek Belarbi (1959–...)
- Nicolas Fiévé (1959–...)
- Bruno Laurioux (1959–...)
- Éric-Emmanuel Schmitt (1960–...)
- Simonetta Greggio (1961–...)
- Bernard Werber (1961–...)
- Charles Dantzig (1961–...)
- Philippe Buc (1961–...)
- Valérie Grumelin-Halimi (1961–...)
- Philippe Claudel (1962–...)
- Virginie Caillé-Bastide (1962–...)
- Catherine Cusset (1963–...)
- Beatrice Hammer (1963–...)
- Kevin Bokeili (1963–2014)
- Alexis Jenni (1963–...)
- Bill Pallot (1964–...)
- Nadine Ribault (1964–2021)
- Pierre Cormon (1965–...)
- Ann Scott (1965–...)
- Stéphane Laurent (1966–...)
- Odile Benyahia-Kouider (1966–...)
- Marie Jaffredo (1966–...)
- Alain Mabanckou (1966–...)
- Delphine Gardey (1967–...)
- Mouna Hachim (1967–...)
- Paul-Louis Roubert (1967–...)
- Jonathan Littell (1967–...)
- Amélie Nothomb (1967–...)
- Basile Panurgias (1967–...)
- Johanna Schipper (1967–...)
- Fatou Diome (1968–...)
- Fréderic Neyrat (1968–...)
- Norbert-Bertrand Barbe (1968–...)
- Kim Thúy (1968–...)
- Éric Vuillard (1968–...)
- Virginie Despentes (1969–...)
- Louis Emond (1969–...)
- Antoine Bello (1970–...)
- Christophe Honoré (1970–...)
- Fabienne Kanor (1970–...)
- Édouard Tétreau (1970–...)
- Philippe Boisnard (1971–...)
- Yannick Mireur (1971–...)
- Angela Behelle (1971–...)
- Nicolas Ancion (1971–...)
- Luis de Miranda (1971–...)
- Nicolas Bouyssi (1972–...)
- Cristina Rodríguez (1972–...)
- Kilien Stengel (1972–...)
- Roland Michel Tremblay (1972–...)
- Aurélie Filippetti (1973–...)
- Romain Sardou (1974–...)
- Guillaume Musso (1974–...)
- Olivier Adam (1974–...)
- Harold Cobert (1974–...)
- Katia Astafieff (1975–...)
- Juliette Rennes (1976–...)
- Lisa Mandel (1977–...)
- Benoît Bringer (1979–...)
- Agnès Martin-Lugand (1979–...)
- Diane Mazloum (1980–...)
- Nahema Hanafi (1983–...)
- Jérémy Marie (1984–...)
- Benjamin Hoffmann (1985–...)
- Oriane Lassus (1987–...)
- Caroline Laurent (1988–...)
- Mélissa Da Costa (1990–...)
- Édouard Louis (1992–...)
- Soraya Nini (1993–...)
- Chloé Wary (1995–...)
- Estelle Beauchamp (novelist since 1995)
- Pierre Verdrager

== See also ==
- List of French women writers
- French literature
- Francophone literature
- Lists of French-language poets, French novelists, French people, authors
- Quebec literature
- List of Quebec authors
- List of Belgian women writers
