= Loque =

Loque may refer to:

- Lokve, Croatia (Italian: Loque), a municipality
- Lokev, Sežana (Italian: Loque), a settlement
- Bertrand de Loque, 16th–17th century French Protestant minister and author
- Loque, a member of the Malaysian band Butterfingers
