= L'enfant interdit =

- Author: Pierre Verdrager
- Language: French
- Publication date: 2013
- ISBN: 9782200286439

L’enfant interdit: Comment la pédophilie est devenue scandaleuse is a 2013 book by Pierre Verdrager.
