= Henri Danoy =

Henri Danoy, in Catalan, Enric Danoy i Bru (Saint-Laurent-de-la-Salanque, 27 January 1859 – 22 August 1928) was a French playwright and linguistic.

With his friend Simon Siné, he created a sort of Roussillonaise operetta. His works are valued by Catalan-language scholars.

== Works ==
=== In Catalan language ===
- Hast'à (sic) la Mort!. Imprimerie Barrière, Perpinyà, 1924

=== In French language ===
- La truffe noire et les truffières rationnelles dans le département du Vaucluse, contenant une préface sur la Mutualité Agricole par M.M Henry Danoy et Joseph Martin, propriétaire, Editorial Seguin, Avinyó, 1910

=== In Occitan language ===
- Esteleto, la fado di tourre d'Ate. Imprimerie Lanet, Ate, 1911
- Mouloun d'auvàri en sounetoun prouvençau. Imprimerie Lanet, Ate, 1912
- Garço m'acò dins lou Couloun. Imprimerie Lanet, Ate, 1912
- Embaumo!. Imprimerie Mistral, Cavalhon, 1921

== See also ==
- Catalan studies
