= Maggi Lidchi-Grassi =

French-born writer and spiritual teacher (1930–2024)

Marguerite "Maggi" Lidchi-Grassi (9 May 1930 – 30 September 2024) was a French-born writer and spiritual teacher.

== Life and writings ==
Lidchi-Grassi was born in Paris on 9 May 1930. During World War II, she lived in South Africa, but later returned to Paris, where she encountered a cousin who had survived Auschwitz. An attempt to understand why things went wrong led her, at the age of seventeen, to discover the works of Sri Aurobindo. In 1959, married and once again living in Africa, she decided to leave her husband and family and, after some attempts to dissuade her, went to the Sri Aurobindo Ashram in Puducherry, India, where she lived in later life. She was the editor of Domani (Tomorrow), a quarterly journal in Italian that has been published by the ashram since 1968.

She preferred to write in English, and produced many novels, short stories, poems and plays. Her book, The Light That Shone into the Dark Abyss, includes a refutation of the purported relationship between Aurobindo's vision of higher mental/spiritual development for humanity and the Nazi concept of a "Master Race".

Her later book, The Great Golden Sacrifice of the Mahabharata, is a retelling of the epic from the viewpoint of Ashwatthama.

Lidchi-Grassi died at her home in Auroville, India, on 30 September 2024, at the age of 94.

== Selected works ==
- Earthman, Victor Gollancz (1967). Published as Man of Earth in the United States by William Morrow (1968). The change was made because the publisher thought the original title sounded like science fiction.
- First Wife, Littlehampton (1981) ISBN 0-575-02786-X
- Great Sir & the Heaven Lady : a True Story of the Experiences of an American Infantry Man Spiritually Guided Through World War II, Writer's Workshop (1993) ISBN 81-7189-472-0
- The Light That Shone into the Dark Abyss, Sri Aurobindo Ashram Publications (1994) ISBN 81-7058-380-2
- The Great Golden Sacrifice of the Mahabharata (Complete in one volume), Random House India (2012) ISBN 81-8400-146-0
