= Pierre Alexandre Jean Mollière =

French general

Pierre Alexandre Jean Mollière (1800 – 6 July 1850) was a French general.
