= Marie Thérèse Péroux d'Abany =

French writer

Marie Thérèse Péroux d’Abany (1753 – 24 March 1821) was a French writer.

== Biography ==
Madame d'Abany was born at Rouen. Her marriage with the violent-tempered officer d’Abany was not happy. After the separation from her husband, she settled down in Saint-Germain-en-Laye. In 1821, she died in the convent of Saint-Thomas-de-Villeneuve, where she had led a pious life.

== Works ==
In 1801, Madame d'Abany wrote a Biblical novel for young girls titled Seïla, fille de Jephté, juge et prince des Hébreux. The novel was published in Paris in two volumes. At the end of the work, the extremely virtuous daughter experiences an ascension to heaven after she has gone with her father to the sacrificial site.

In her prose poem L’Amazone française ou Jeanne d'Arc (2 volumes, 1819 and 1823), the strictly Catholic and royalist-minded author has Joan of Arc predict for Blanche of Castile the French Revolution, the death of King Louis XVI and the reign of Louis XVIII.
