= Bill Pallot =

French art historian

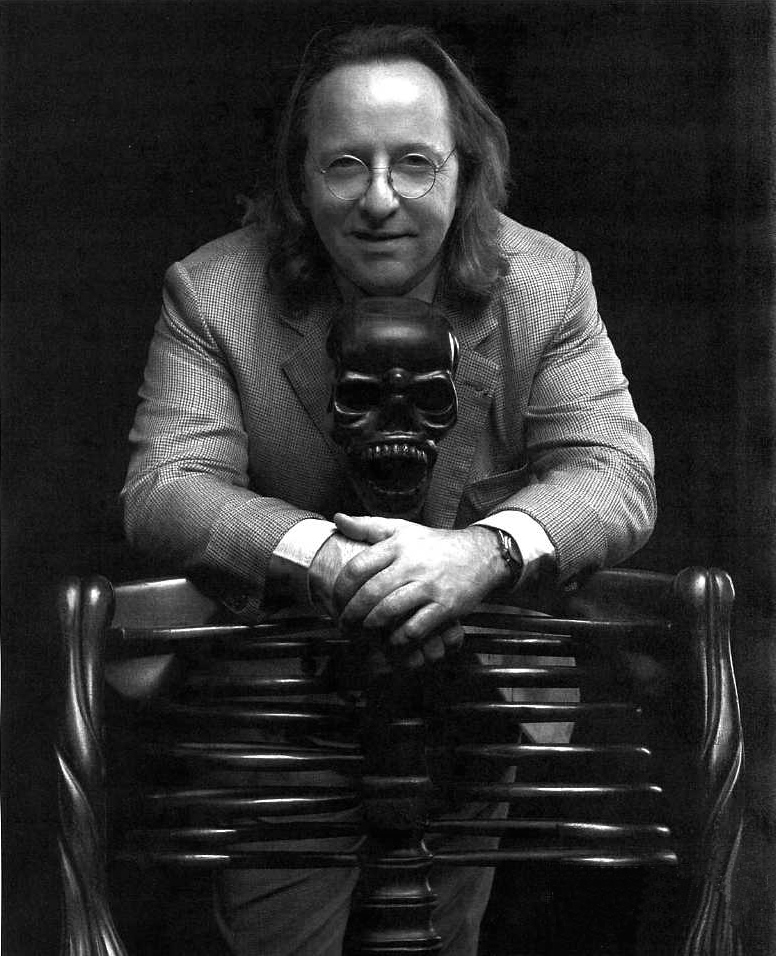
- Bill Pallot by Karl Lagerfeld, 2013

Bill G.B. Pallot (born 17 February 1964) is an art historian, art expert, collector and lecturer at the Sorbonne University (Paris IV). He was honored with the French distinction of Ordre des Arts et des Lettres Chevalier (1997) and he is now Officier in the same distinction (2011). In 2016, he was indicted for making and selling false eighteenth century furniture, some of which were sold to the Palace of Versailles.

== Life and career ==
He is the son of Maurice-Claude Pallot, an antiques dealer in Burgundy, France. Bill Pallot first studied classics and history of art at the University of Lyon, France. He then continued his studies in history of art at the Sorbonne in Paris until he obtained his Diplome des Hautes études Approfondies en Histoire de L'art (D.E.A., 1986). The subject of his thesis entitled "Les Tilliard et les Foliot, menuisiers en siéges aux XVIIéme et XVIIIéme siècles".

For over 20 years, he has been in charge of the department of furniture and objets d'art at the Didier Aaron Gallery in Paris. Advising major art collectors, he shares his passion for 18th century art with his private clients and students at the Sorbonne where he has been teaching for more than fifteen years.

He is a member of the Syndicat National des Antiquaires (Paris), a member of the Syndicat Français des Experts Professionnels (Paris) and a member of the Compagnie des Experts, the grouping of sworn experts before the Court of Appeal of Paris. He is a sworn expert in good standing before the Court of Appeal of Paris as well as before the French Customs authorities. Beyond this, he has donated to the Département des Objets d'Art of the Louvre Museum an armchair, c. 1770–75, by N.Q. Foliot (1996, Inv OA 11813) and a chair, c. 1785, by IB Boulard (2004, Inv. OA 12134). Under his patronage, a suite of 4 Louis XVI folding stools (2001, Inv. 1972) belonging to the Jacquemart-Andre Museum was restored.

As a member of the Cressent Club (President : Maryvonne Pinault), he was also a sponsor of the restoration of the Department of Objets d'Art at the Louvre Museum.

== Practical work ==
The contribution of Bill Pallot to the history of furniture is far reaching and measured by the publication of the history of chairs from 1700 to the start of the Louis XVI style (in "Bill Pallot, Antiquaire" by Roxana Azimi, Journal des Arts, April 2011). Having written his first book at the age of 22, "L'art du siège au XVIIIème siècle en France", published in 1987, ACR-Gismondi editions, then " The Furniture of the Louvre- chairs and consoles of the 17th and 18th Century", published in 1993 by Faton editions, he is considered as one of the most distinguished experts on chairs of the Age of Enlightenment.

He was a member of the Scientific committee for the major exhibition "18° siècle. Aux sources du Design.Chefs-d'œuvre du mobilier 1650–1790" ("18th Century. Birth of Design. Furniture Masterpieces 1650–1790" ) at the Palace of Versailles from 28 October 2014 to 22 February 2015, he was one of the contributors to the catalogue of the exhibition.

== Forgery accusations ==
In 2014, Ballot had raised suspicion for furniture he had sold to the Palace the Versailles as genuine, amongst others chairs falsely claimed to be historic pieces that adorned the rooms of the likes of Madame du Barry, the mistress of Louis XV, or Queen Marie-Antoinette. There had been warnings and suspicions raised by investigators, the full scandal erupted in 2016 when the French ministry of culture ordered an audit of Versailles' acquisitions policy.

On Monday 13 November 2023, Pallot and 5 conspirators were issued a trial order by the investigating magistrate.
