= Jérôme Besoigne =

French Jansenist apologist

Jérôme Besoigne (1686 in Paris – 1763) was a prominent Jansenist apologist and oppositionist to the Bull "Unigenitus."

== Biography ==
Besoigne was ordained in 1715 and received a doctorate at the Sorbonne in 1718. He served as assistant principal of the College of Plessis until his defence of Jansenism and his opposition to the Bull "Unigenitus" obliged him to resign the post. In 1729, the Sorbonne erased him from the list of Doctors and, in 1731, he was exiled from Paris. During the following year he was allowed to return.

== Bibliography ==
Works by Besoigne include:

- History of the Abbey of Port Royal (6 vols.),
- Concorde des livres de la Sagesse (Paris, 1737)
- Lives of the Four Bishops engaged in the case of Port Royal
- Morale des Apôtres ou concorde des épîtres de saint Paul et des épîtres cononiques du N. T. (Paris, 1747).
