= Nicolas Bouyssi =

French novelist

Nicolas Bouyssi (born 1972) is a French novelist. A school teacher by profession, Bouyssi has published several books. These include:

- Le Gris, P.O.L, 2007.
- En plein vent, P.O.L, 2008.
- Compression, P.O.L, 2009.
- Les Algues, P.O.L, 2010.
- S'autodétruire et les enfants, P.O.L, 2011., (reviewed by Le Monde, nominated for the Prix Wepler)
- Esthétique du stéréotype : essai sur Édouard Levé, PUF, 2011.
- Les Rayons du soleil, P.O.L, 2013. (nominated for the Prix Wepler)

He has also published short stories.
