= Michèle Lesbre =

French writer

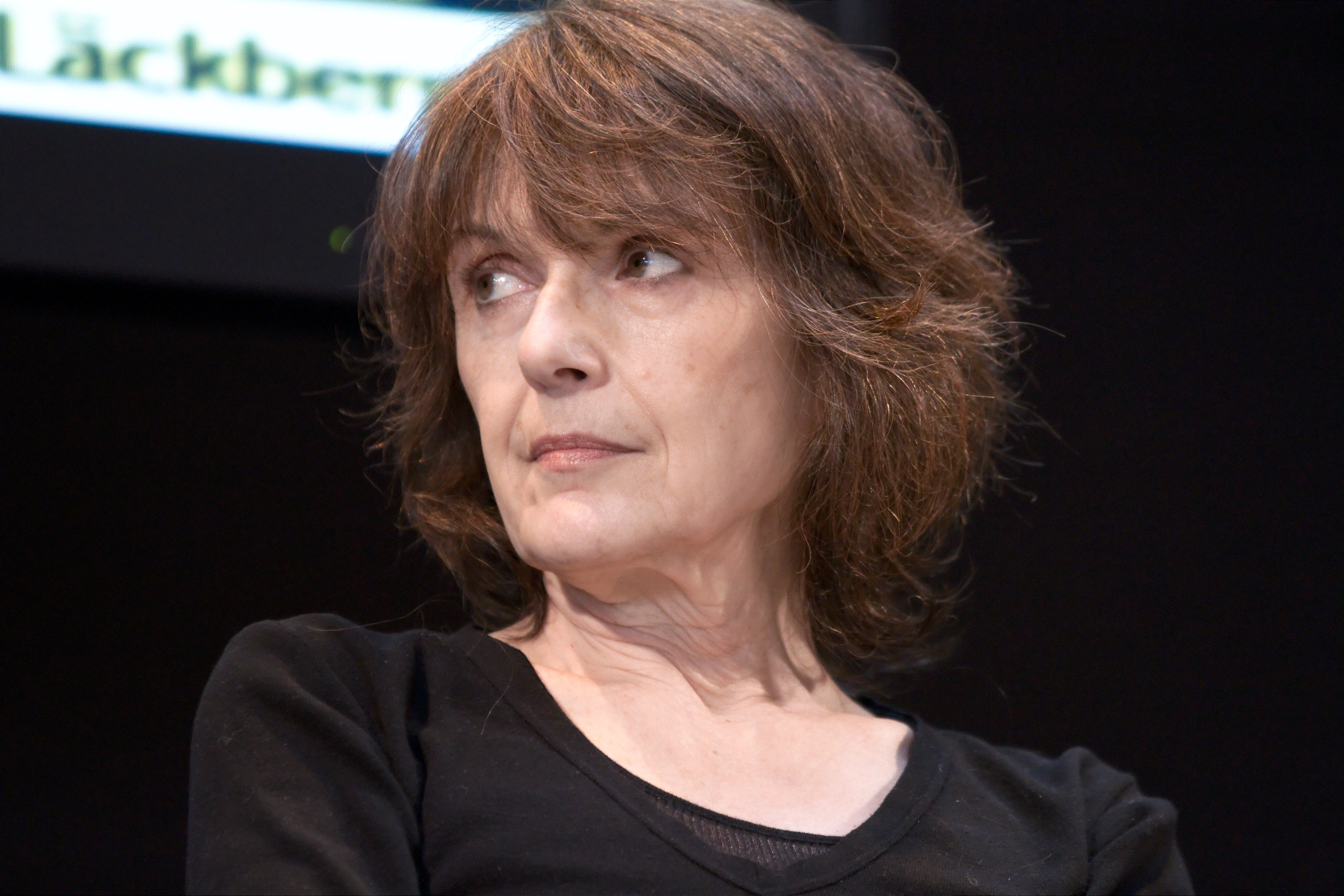
Michele Lesbre in 2010.

Michèle Lesbre (born 25 November 1939 in Tours) is a French writer best known for her novel Le canapé Rouge (2007) which was nominated for Prix Goncourt in 2008. She was invested with the Ordre des Arts et des Lettres in 2010.
