= Daniel Oster =

French writer (1938–1999)

Daniel Oster (1938–1999) was a French writer. He wrote more than 20 books in a variety of genres, spanning both fiction and non-fiction. A specialist in French literature of the 19th century, he wrote extensively on Paul Valéry and Stephane Mallarmé. In recognition of his contributions, he received the Chevalier de l’Ordre National du Mérite from the French government.
