= Paul Foulquié =

French philosopher and thinker

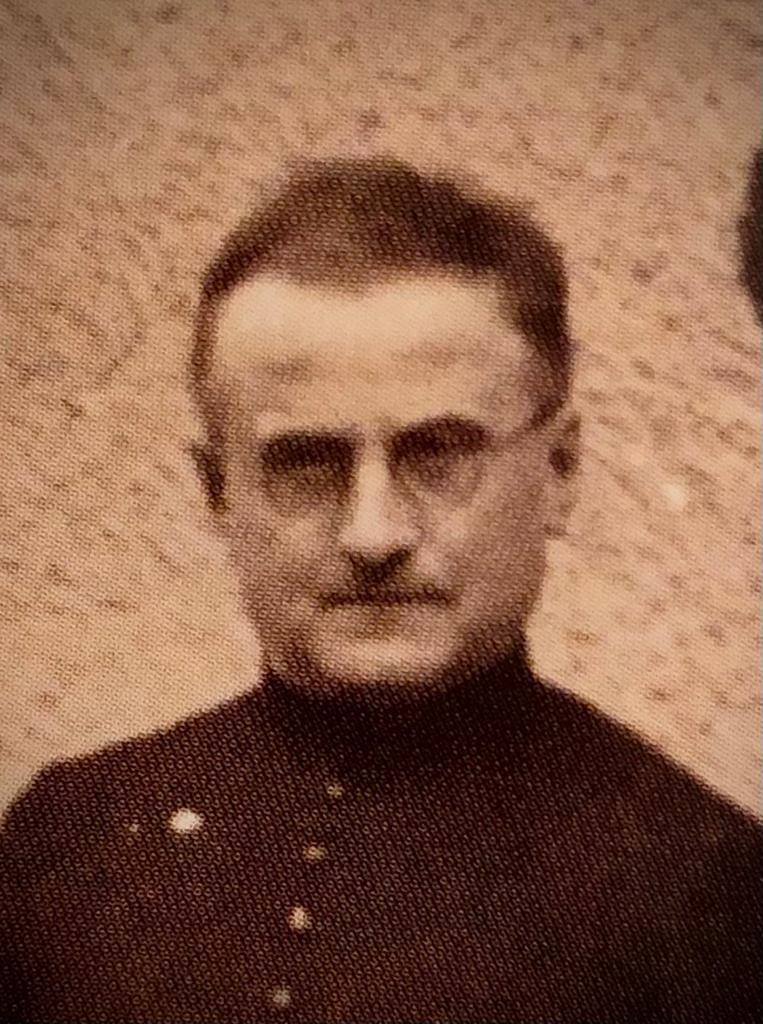
- Born: 16 March 1893; Prendeignes, France
- Died: 6 September 1983 (aged 90); Pau, Pyrénées-Atlantiques, France

Philosophical work
- Main interests: metaphysics; epistemology; existentialism; psychology
- Notable works: Dictionnaire de la langue philosophique

Paul Foulquié (16 March 1893 – 6 September 1983) was a French thinker and philosopher known for his books on metaphysics, epistemology, existentialism and psychology. His works have been translated into different languages.

== Bibliography ==
- L'existentialisme (1947. Engl., Existentialism, 1948)
- Precis de philosophie (1948)
- La volonté (1972)
- La dialectique (1953)
- La psychologie contemporaine (1951)
- Psychologie (1952)
- Dictionnaire de la langue philosophique by Foulquié Paul (1986)
- Diccionario de Pedogogia (1976)
- Dictionnaire de la langue pédagogique (French Edition) by Paul Foulquié and Quadrige (1997)
- Précis de philosophie Tome III Métaphysique (1955)
- l'action. Cours de philosophie (1961)
- Alain (French Edition) (1965)
- Précis de philosophie à l'usage des candidats au baccalauréat tome 2: Logique-morale métaphysique (1952)
- Précis de philosophie à l'usage des candidats au baccalauréat Tome 1 Psychologie (1936)
- La Republique, Livre VII (1965)
- La psychologie contemporaine (1951)
