= Loïc Le Ribault =

French geologist and essayist

Loïc Le Ribault (18 April 1947 – 6 June 2007) was a French geologist and essayist. Loïc le Ribault created the OS5 formula, which was called Silicium G5 in Europe and labeled as Orgono Living Silica in the United States.

In 2004 he was convicted of illegally practising medicine.

== Books ==
- L’Exoscopie des quartz, Éditions Masson, Paris:1977, ISBN 9782225461231
- Microanalyse et criminalistique
- Micropolis, 1998
- Le prix d'une découverte - Lettre à mon juge, 1998
- L'Irlande, un an plus tard, 2001
- Qui a peur de Loïc Le Ribault ?
- La Silice Organique, L'Élément Silicium, Son rôle, ses Bienfaits" (Organic Silica, The Silicon Element, Its Role, Its Benefits)

== Bibliography ==
- Valérie Duby & Alain Jourdan, Loïc Le Ribault : Savant maudit ?, Favre, 2005, ISBN 978-2828908065
- John McPhee, Irons in the Fire, (1998).

== Filmography ==
- Mandat d’arrêt contre un chercheur, documentary, Satya productions, by Jean-Yves Bilien and Pantxo Arretz.
