= Charles Duchaussois =

French writer (1940–1991)

Charles Duchaussois (27 January 1940 – 27 February 1991) was a French writer. Duchaussois is most noted for his autobiographical novel Flash ou le Grand Voyage.

== Biography ==
Born to diplomats, Charles was hit in the eye by shrapnel during a morning air raid when he was 4 months and 8 days old. This left him blind in one eye, a detail often evoked in his novels. In his 20s, he decided to leave for the south of France after getting fed-up with the Île-de-France. After various thefts, frauds, and multiple trips to prison, Charles left for Lebanon to meet a friend. This is where "Flash ou le grand voyage" starts.

It was 1969 at the zenith of the hippie movement, from Marseille to Beirut, from Istanbul to Baghdad, taking long detours in India, by boat, on foot, in car, Charles got closer to Kathmandu. His trip began by accident in Lebanon, with arms and hashish tradings. His destination was Kathmandu. His trip was groundbreaking from a geographical perspective but also from the sheer number of drugs he discovered. He developed a drug addiction, offering the reader not only a look at his exploits but also his challenges. He was medically repatriated to Paris on 10 January 1970, after six months of worsening addiction. The end of his trip touches insanity, Charles escaping death several times at the last minute. Upon his return, he recorded the tale of his adventure on 18 magnetic tapes and sent it to Fayard publishing house in December 1970., Insanity, death & excess, it was the decade. This psychedelic novel gives us a clear and sometimes crazy insider's look at hippie wave of the 60s.

After "Flash" : Until November 1970, he struggles with drug addiction, helped by Jocelyne, a French woman he met at Kathmandu. Charles and Jocelyne don't escape from the world of drugs, working odd jobs, raiding Parisian pharmacies, going insane and then to detox. At the beginning of 1971, they moved to Switzerland, to La Chaux-de-Fonds. 3 November 1971, their son Krishna-Romain was born. The name was in honor of a servant Charles had in Kathmandu and a friend of Charles who settled in Kuwait. At the beginning of 1972, Charles wants to travel again (in South America), but Jocelyne wants a stable life to raise Krishna-Romain.

Charles left to go live in Paris. He remarried in 1974 to Christiane, and had a baby girl: V. They separated in 1977. At the end of 1978, tragedy struck, Charles was imprisoned for homicide. Divorced in 1983, he met Fernanda and remarried for the third time in the Paris region. They divorced in 1986.

Duchaussois died of lung cancer 27 February 1991 at the hospital Saint-Michel in Paris.

Monsieur S., funeral director recognized him and let him be entombed in the Valenton intermunicipal cemetery. He rests in an unmarked grave with two brothers at his side.
