= Bernard Gheur =

Belgian writer and journalist

- Born: 18 February 1945; Liège, Belgium
- Occupations: Journalist, Novelist,

Bernard Gheur (born 18 February 1945) is a Belgian writer and journalist. In 2007, he received a prize from the Belgian parliament for his reporting on immigration. He also received the Marcel Thiry prize in 2012 for his novel Les Étoiles de l'aube and the Prix des Lycéens in 2013.
