= Virginie Caillé-Bastide =

French writer

Virginie Caillé-Bastide is a French writer of historical fiction. She was born in 1962 in Lorient. Her historical novels Le Sans Dieu and Le Sans Maitre are set in 18th-century Brittany.
