= Félix Narjoux =

French architect

Félix Narjoux (19 December 1836 – 1891) was a French architect.
