= Nicolas de Bralion =

French oratorian and ecclesiastical writer

Nicolas de Bralion (1600 – 1672) was a French oratorian and ecclesiastical writer who was influential on bringing various Italian ideas into France. De Bralion joined the Paris Oratory in 1619 and published a number of historical and religious books.
