= Pierre Verdrager =

Pierre Verdrager is a French writer. He wrote L'homosexualité dans tous ses états (2007) and L’enfant interdit (2013).
