= Jérémy Marie =

French travel writer

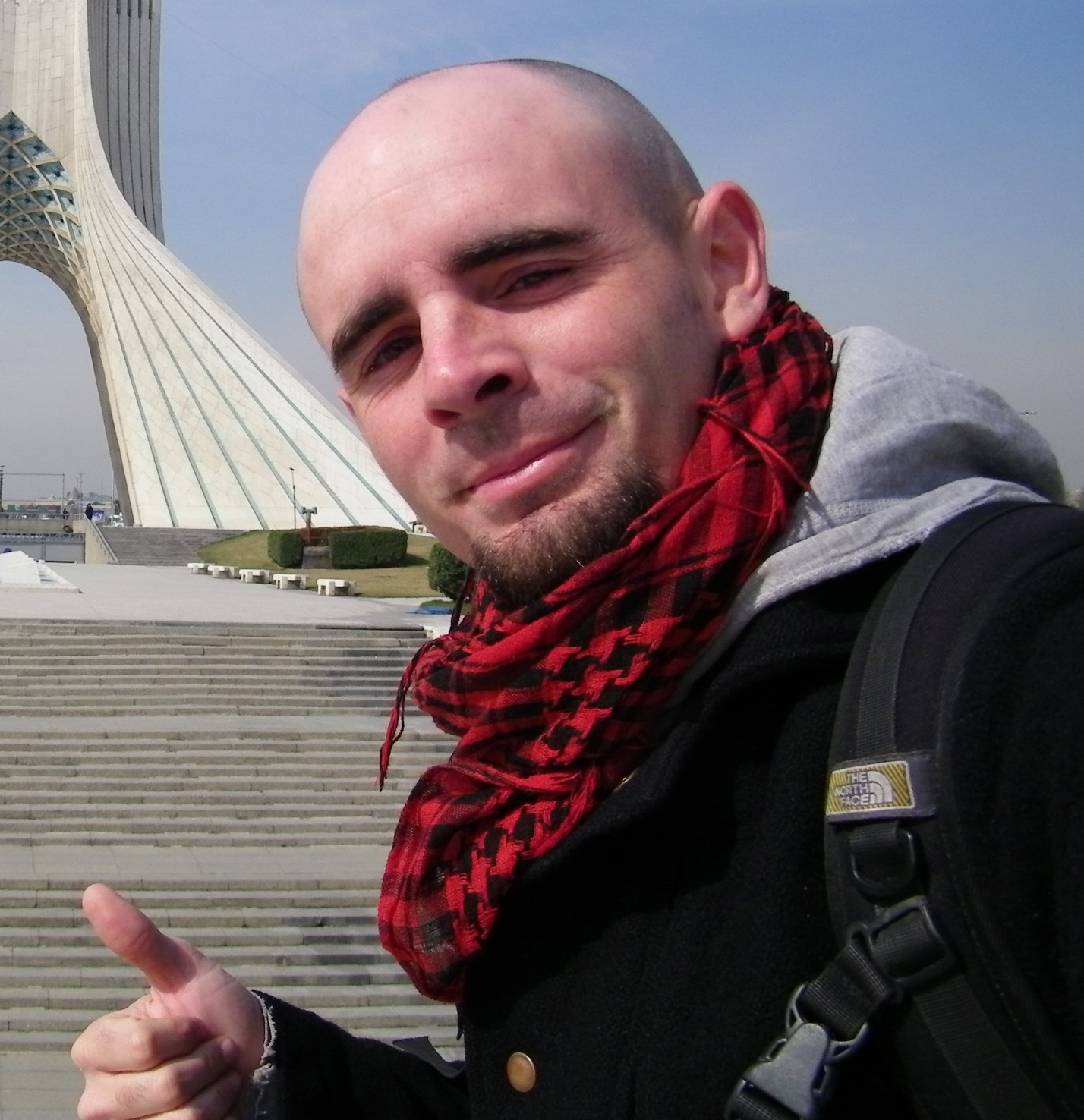
- Jérémy Marie in Tehran, 2013
- Born: 12 March 1984 (age 42); Rouen, France
- Occupation: Travel writer
- Writing career
- Genre: Travel literature

Jérémy Marie (born 12 March 1984) is a French traveler and the author of the travel book Mon tour du monde en 1980 jours (Around the world in 1980 days), that describes his world tour by hitchhiking that he accomplished between 8 October 2007 and 12 March 2013.

== Biography ==
=== Early life ===
Jérémy Marie grew up in the suburbs of Rouen in France until 2004, when he decided to go to live for one year in Llandrindod Wells in Wales in order to learn the English language. When he came back in 2005, he traveled around Europe mostly by hitchhiking, going from France to the Baltic states. In 2006, he did a tour of France by hitchhiking, before to begin his world tour in 2007.

=== Tour of the world by hitchhiking ===
==== Itinerary ====
8 October 2007, Jérémy Marie started his world tour by hitchhiking from Caen in Lower Normandy. His itinerary took him first across Europe and the Balkans on the way to Turkey. He decided to continue his journey through the Middle East and towards Africa, that he crossed on its eastern side all the way to South Africa. In January 2008, he left the city of Cape Town as a crew member on a delivering catamaran and sailed across the Atlantic Ocean all the way to Panama City, that he reached in March 2008. He went back on the road on the way to North America, crossing Central America, Mexico, the United States up to Alaska, then went down to South America all the way to Ushuaia. In March 2010, he boarded in Cartagena, Colombia the sailing boat Khamsin as a crew member and crossed the Pacific Ocean to Auckland in New Zealand. This journey that Jérémy Marie claimed to have done by "boat-hitchhiking" took him during four months to the Galápagos Islands, the Marquesas Islands, to Tahiti, Niue, to Nuku'alofa in Tonga and finally to New Zealand. From Auckland, he kept hitchhiking this time by Container ship to Brisbane in Australia, then from Darwin, Northern Territory he hitchhiked a plane to Bali in Indonesia. Finally he travelled around Southeast Asia, China, Central Asia, Iran and Europe again to complete his world tour where he started it, in Caen 12 March 2013.

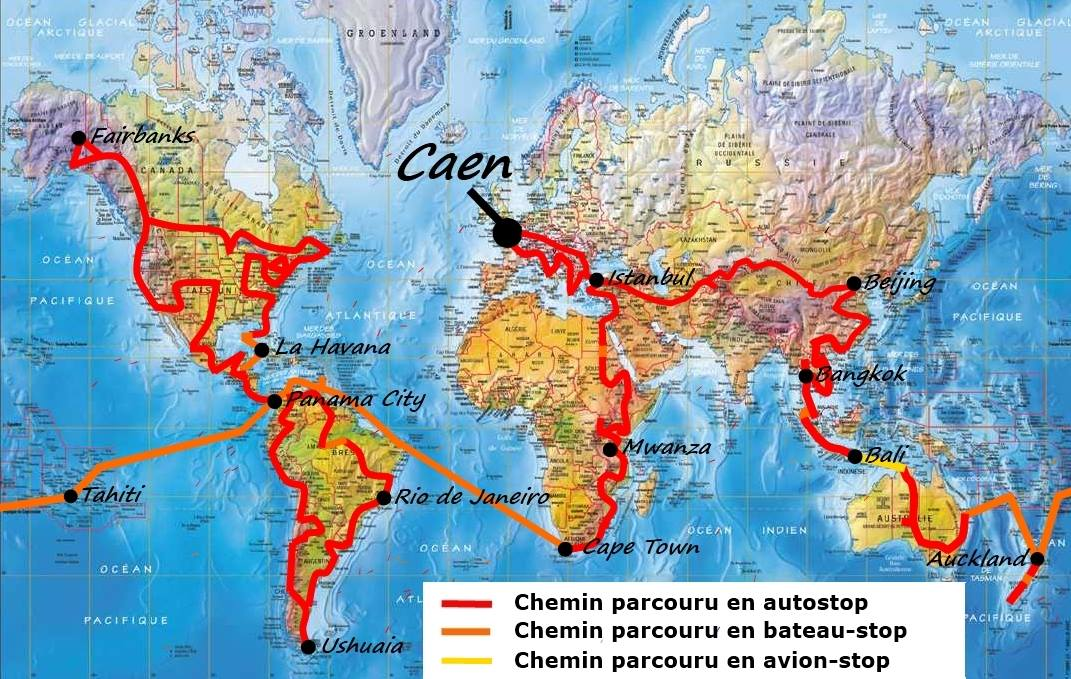
Itinerary of the world tour by hitchhiking (2007-2013).

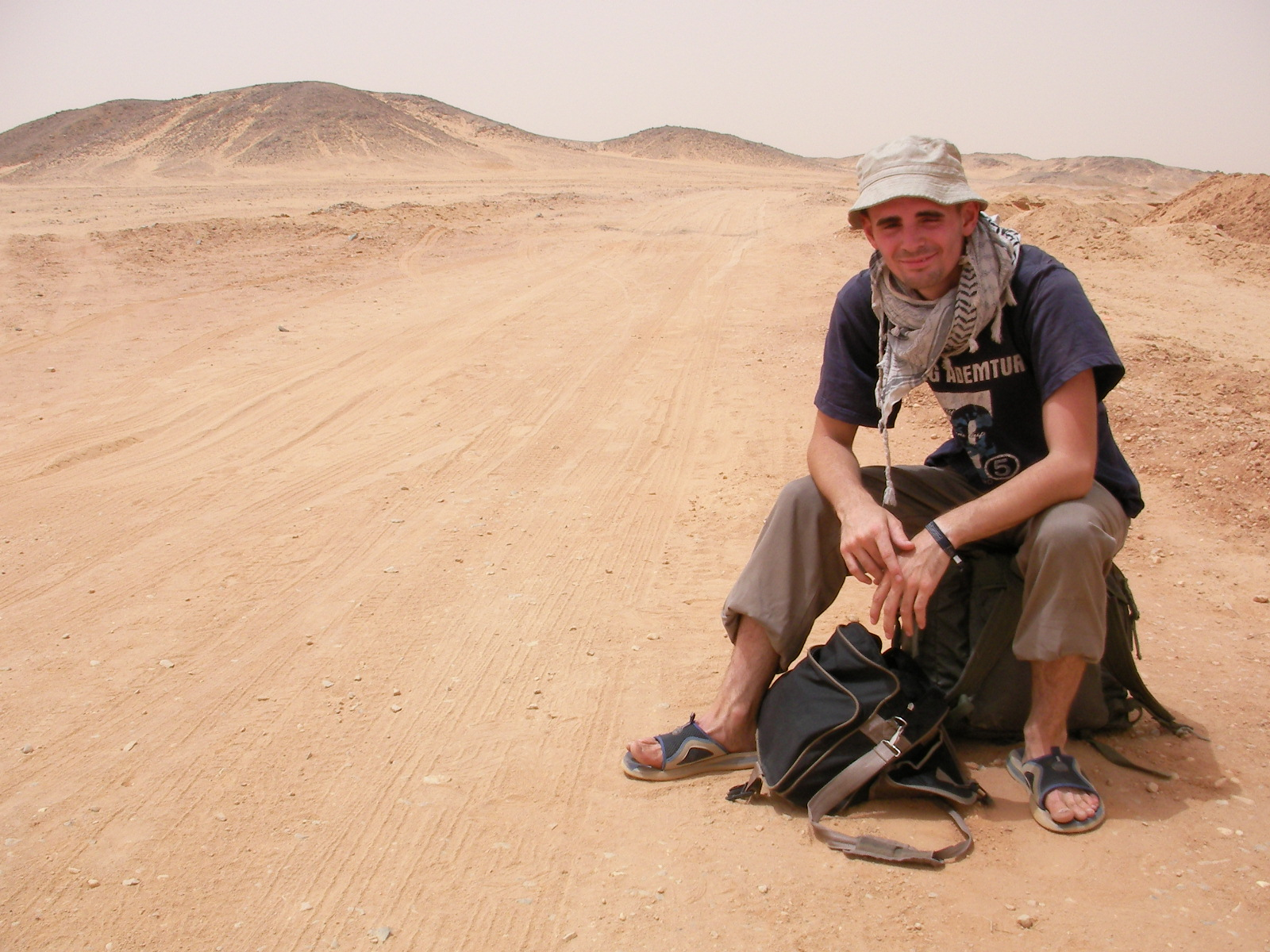
Waiting on the side of the road in Wadi Alfa, Sudan.

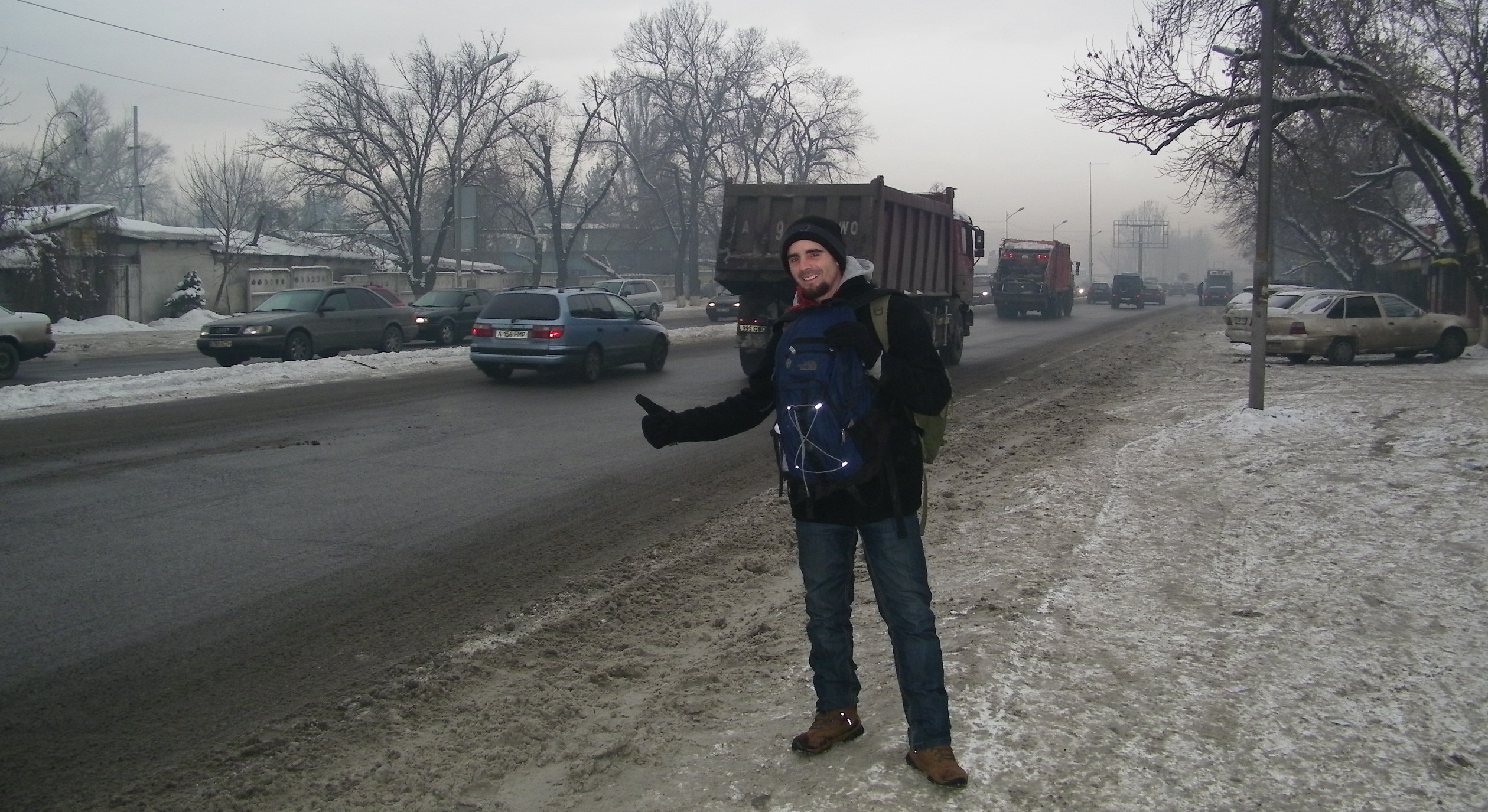
Hitchhiking Almaty, Kazakhstan.

==== Traveling facts ====
During his world tour by hitchhiking, Jérémy Marie traveled 180,700 kilometers, using 1752 different vehicles and entering 71 countries and territories. During a part of his journey, he communicated with the students of the Primary school Le Clos Herbert in Caen in order to share the information that he was collecting on the road.

While he traveled in Bali, Jérémy Marie met his Indonesian wife Herdiwati Sidabutar, with whom he lives today.

== Bibliography ==
- Mon tour du monde en 1980 jours, City Éditions (2013)
