= Léon Broutin =

Léon Broutin (fl. 1865–77) was a French writer of vaudevilles and cabaret song texts. His notable works included:

- Vive Lille!! - A mes amis A. Briffaut et E. Lépine. Paroles de Émile Duhem, Léon Broutin, musique de d'Émile Duhem.
- La Maison ensorcelée. 1865
- Le Docteur Sans Pareil!!! ou la médication universelle 1865
- La Muse au cabaret. Chansons nouvelles, par Léon Broutin 1866
- Le Tambour-major. - C'est-à-s'en lécher les doigts. - Chansons par Léon Broutin
- A ma Soeur, couplets chantés le 25 septembre 1877 Léon Broutin - 1877
- Quéqu'part, chansonnette... paroles de Léon Broutin, musique de d'Émile Duhem.
