= Louis Mélennec =

French singer, historian and activist

Louis Mélennec de Beyre (born 18 March 1941) is a French lawyer, doctor, singer, and historian, writing and performing as Louis Mélennec. He is active in Breton nationalism.

== Books and CDs ==
- Louis Mélennec de Beyre and Lorenzo Cipriani : Chants religieux et traditionnels bretons (audio CD in Breton).
