= François Stoepel =

François Stoepel, also Dr. Franz Stoepel (1794 – 19 December 1836) was a French music critic, writer, journalist, pianist, and pedagogue. He was a classical music critic for Gazette Musicale de Paris from 1834, and was an expert in Beethoven, for whom he wrote many articles for the paper until his death in 1836. He was the author of numerous theoretical and works and instruction books, and authored a biography on George Onslow, George Onslow : esquisse biographique.

As a music educator he didn't have much success, although he did translate Cherubini's Cours de contrepoint into German. Stoepel was also known to be a concert organizer, and often organized concerts at the Salle Pleyel known as matinée musicale, featuring some of the top virtuoso pianists of the period. On 25 March 1834 he organized a concert there featuring Frederic Chopin and Franz Liszt, one of only seven times they performed together.
