= Alzir Hella =

French translator

Alzir Hella (30 December 1881 – 14 July 1953) was a French translator. In collaboration with Olivier Bournac, he contributed to the knowledge of German literature in France during the first half of the 20th century.

== Biography ==
Alzir Hella was born in northern France, into a working-class, partly Walloon family.
