= Étienne Pélabon =

French writer

Estève Pelabon
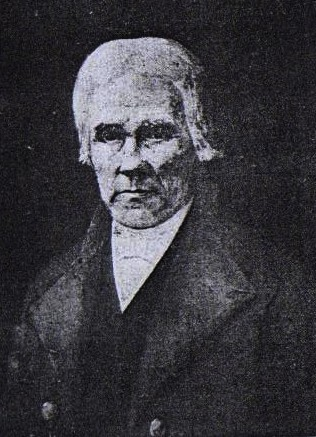
- Born: Etienne Pélabon; January 25th Tolon, Marquisate of Provence, Kingdom of France
- Died: November 1, 1808
- Occupation: Theatre manchinist
- Writing career
- Pen name: Estève Pelabon (in occitan language)
- Language: occitan (maritim provençal from Toulon
- Genre: Comedy
- Notable work: Manicla

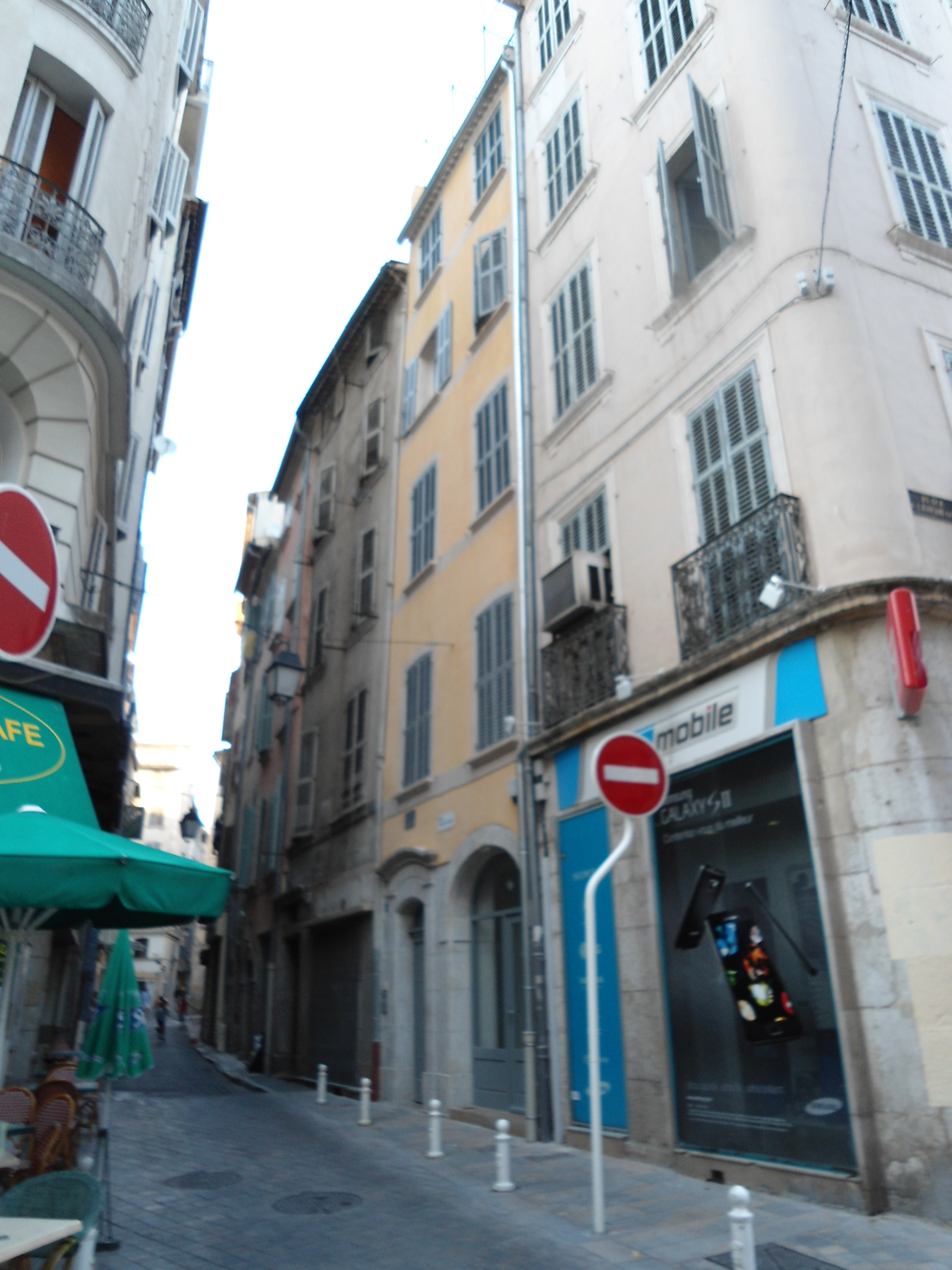
House where Etienne Pélabon was born in Tolon (3rd buildind on the right)

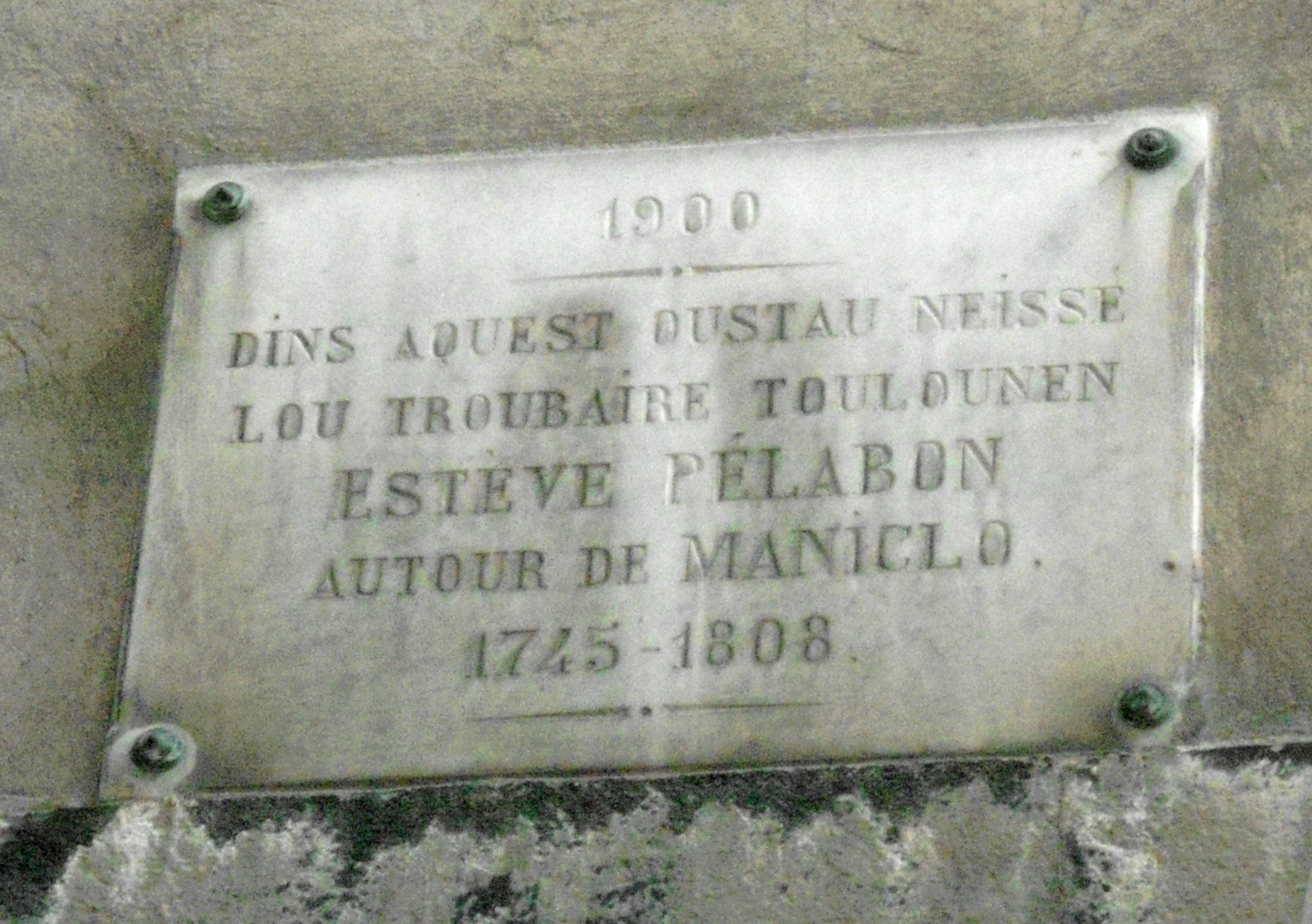
Plate that says in occitan : "In this house the troubadour Etienne Pélabon, Maniclo's author, was born"

Étienne Pélabon (in Occitan : Estève Pelabon - Tolon, 25 January 1745 - Marseille ?, 1 November 1808) was a Provençal Occitan-language writer from the 18th century. He is above all remembered for his play Maniclo (classical norm : Manicla).

Maniclo was staged for the first time in 1789, and according to Occitan scholar Robèrt Lafont, 12,000 copies were printed.
