= André Jardin =

French historian (1912–1996)

André Jardin (1912–1996) was a French biographer and historian, best known for his studies on Alexis de Tocqueville and 18th-century French history. His biography Alexis de Tocqueville (1805–1858), written in 1984, and translated into English in 1988 as Tocqueville: A Biography by Lydia Davis and Robert Hemenway, received wide acclaim.

== Tocqueville scholarship ==
Tocqueville: A Biography by André Jardin

Jardin's decades-long work on the committee which collected and published Tocqueville's papers provided an excellent background for his biography of the famed political scientist and writer. While best known for his study of the nascent American republic, Tocqueville also had a long and varied career as a politician, and was a writer on French political history. Jardin provides exhaustive detail on all aspects of Tocqueville's life, including his sometimes intense friendships and his marriage to a middle-class Englishwoman some years his senior.

Critics generally lauded the biography as the best study yet produced of Tocqueville's life and work. Historian Arthur Schlesinger, Jr. typically praised the book as "well-researched, informative and illuminating". Literary critic Max Lerner called it a "definitive biography", and wrote that "André Jardin, currently general editor of the massive ongoing 30-volume collection of everything Tocqueville wrote, now presents the life with learning, authority, and precision."

In fact, a few critics felt that the biography was all too precise and detailed. In the Los Angeles Times Book Review, Annette Smith and David Smith demurred: "This long and scrupulous study of a man who was one of the most profound and prophetic thinkers of his time is, alas, scrupulous to the point of boredom [...] Although [the book] does justice to Tocqueville's ideas, it fails in rendering the passion and grace of his intellectual life and the social brilliance of the era".

== Other works ==
Jardin also wrote, with Andre-Jean Tudesq, Restoration and Reaction, 1815–1848 (English translation of La France des Notables, 1973), a wide-ranging account of French life in Paris and the provinces during the turbulent era after Napoleon's downfall. Critics appreciated the breadth of the work, but some reviewers felt the book tried to be too comprehensive and thus could not adequately explore many facets of post-revolutionary French history.

In 1985 Jardin published Histoire du libéralisme politique: De la crise de l'absolutisme à la Constitution de 1875, a study of the political upheavals in France following the country's decisive defeat in the Franco-Prussian War of 1870–71.
