= Louis Dollot =

French diplomat

Louis Dollot (1915–1997) was a French diplomat.
