= Yannick Mireur =

French political scientist and author

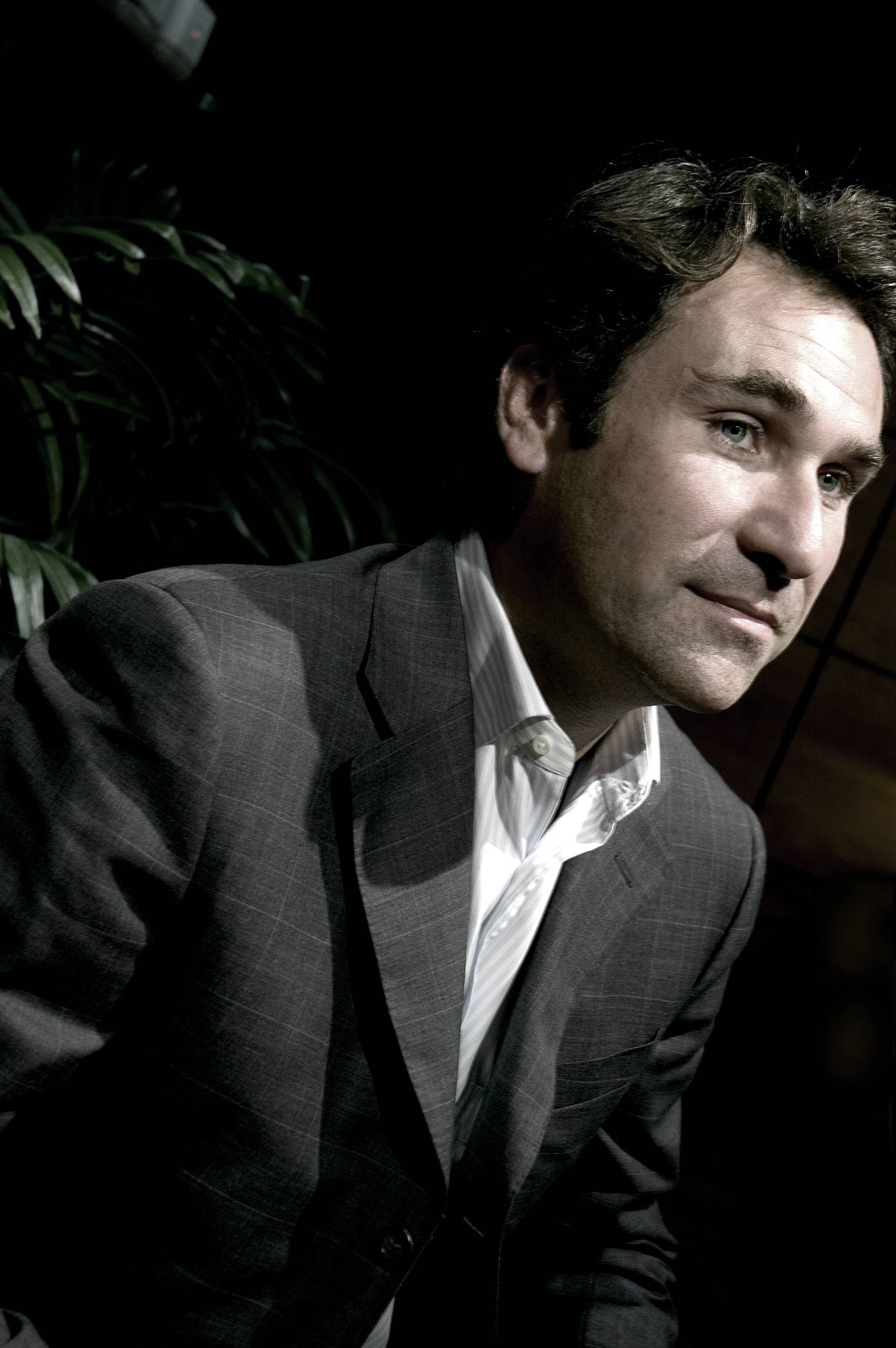
- Born: 1971 (age 54–55)
- Education: Ph.D. Fletcher School of Law and Diplomacy
- Occupations: Consultant, author
- Organization: Nexus forum

Yannick Mireur (born 1971) is a French political scientist and author specializing in American affairs and U.S. foreign policy. and the founder of Nexus forum, an independent organization that holds events and roundtables on the urban digital and energy transition.

Formerly with Cambridge Energy Research Associates, an energy consultancy where he worked on European gas matters, he later directed a Paris-based, independent think tank and publication center, Institut Choiseul, where he founded Politique Américaine, the French leading quarterly journal on US affairs with a board of US policymakers and scholars such as Joseph Bye, Francis Fukuyama, James Schlesinger and many others. Mireur was chief editor of the journal between 2004 and 2011. He is also the author of two books on American politics and society (see below After Bush: Why America Will Not Change and Obama's World).

== Education ==
A graduate of Institut d'Études Politiques de Paris, Yannick Mireur earned an MA and a PhD from the Fletcher School of Law and Diplomacy at Tufts University in Boston where he was awarded a Fulbright Program scholarship. He has taught at the French Military Academy of Saint-Cyr and is a frequent guest of leading French networks and stations to comment on US and international affairs.

== Writings ==
Under press in August 2008, as Barack Obama had not yet won the Democratic presidential nomination, Après Bush went against the mainstream arguing that the strength of American Conservatism would survive the presidency of George W. Bush. While the book reckoned that America needed to reinvent a social contract and a global leadership, it also argued that the lasting hey-day of Liberalism since FDR had been followed by a Conservative cycle that was still running its course, as the later emergence of the Tea Party movement would show. However corroded, the post-Bush Conservative movement was still a powerful one in American politics. Reminding the reader of Arthur Schlesinger’s cycles of American history, the book analyzes the sources of America's various political currents and their legacies. In his foreword, former French Foreign Minister Hubert Védrine wrote: “After Bush undertakes the more ambitious task of reconstituting the richness and complexity of these issues and events in American history and in deeper American political ideals.”

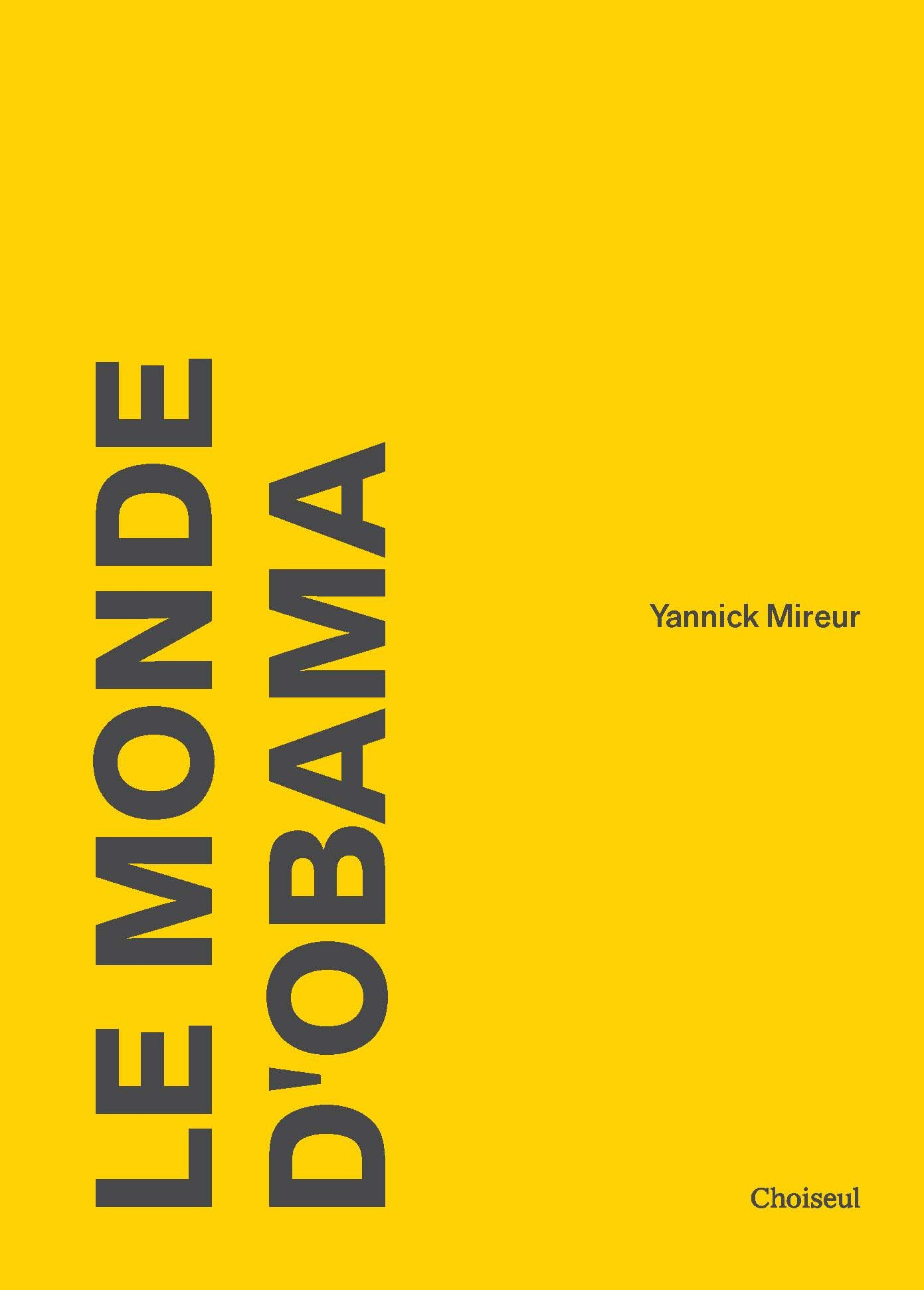

Published three years later, Le Monde d’Obama largely centers on the China-US relationship and international affairs. Half way into the Obama presidency, the book argues that the main force in international politics in the 21st century is the rise of individual aspirations and the desire for breathing space by populations suffocating under authoritarian rule, as the so-called "Arab spring" illustrated.

Both books explain American political progressivism at length, and how it influenced Obama’s political thinking. In both books the author argues that America needs to reinvent a progressivist project to revive its self-confidence and restore its unipolar power. Similar to what FDR did with his New Deal; forging a new relationship between the state and the market, and with the expansion of American leadership.

Mireur has given numerous lectures in the US (Center for Strategic and International Studies, University of Minnesota in Minneapolis, University of Columbia, University of Ottawa, California Technology Institute, etc.), and has contributed editorials to the French business daily Les Échos (France). He is a registered contributor to the newspaper’s online platform Les Cercle Les Echos. He is a regular guest of French TV and radio media outlets and appeared on CNN as guest of Christiane Amanpour.

His latest book, Populisme smart (2022) proposes a way to reconcile ordinary voters with the ruling elites by owning the anxieties of many among the working class. The book extends a previous work, Hausser le ton! (Raising your voice) that addressed French politics. Offering a historical comparison of the key political and policy issues that have riled the French public debate in the 1930s, the 1970s and the 2010s, and pointing out to a general climate of moral apathy, the book called for raising the general level of the public debate in France and for abandoning the coded political language that loses people and exacerbates the malaise generated by globalization. The chapter called "Urbanity" examines the role of aesthetics in politics, and how architecture is an integral part of political action, arguing that ambitious urban policies would greatly contribute to restore the social fabric.
