= Auguste Edgard Dietrich =

French linguist and translator

- Born: 1846
- Died: DOD unknown

Auguste Edgard Dietrich or Auguste Edgar Dietrich (born 1846 in Nancy) was a French author and translator.

== Biography ==
From an early age he took a special interest in the German language and literature, and was the first to translate two of Max Nordau's works into French under the following titles: Les mensonges conventionnels de notre civilisation (1886) and Le mal du siècle (1890). He contributed to many French and foreign reviews, such as La Revue du Nord, La Jeune France, and Le Messager de Vienne, and translated Charlotte Lady Blennerhasset's Madame de Staël et son temps (German: Frau von Staël, ihre Freunde und ihre Bedeutung in Politik und Literatur; 1890). His original publications include Les maîtresses de Louis XV (1881), Rouget de Lisle et la Marseillaise (1882), Jacques Richard et la presse (1886) and La mort de Danton (1888). He also edited the Poésies de Jacques Richard (1885).
