= Paul Naudet =

French priest and author (1959–1929)

- Born: June 27, 1859; Bordeaux, France
- Died: October 15, 1929 (aged 70); Saint-Michel-de-Fronsac, France
- Occupations: Journalist, Priest

Paul Naudet (1859–1929) was a French Catholic priest and author. He published the First Principles of Catholic Sociology in 1899.

== Works ==
Naudet wrote multiple books, some of which are:

- Notre œuvre sociale (1894)
- Mes souvenirs (1895)
- Vers l'avenir (1896)
- Le christianisme social, propriété, capital et travail (1898)
- Notre devoir social, questions pratiques de morale individuelle et sociale (1899)
- Premiers principes de sociologie catholique (1899)
- La démocratie et les démocrates chrétiens (1900)
