= Maximilien Winter =

French philosopher of mathematics

Maximilien Winter (1871–1935) was a French philosopher of mathematics.

In 1893 Winter helped Xavier Léon to found the Revue de métaphysique et de morale. After the First World War Winter ran the Supplément of the Revue until his death in 1935.

== Works ==
- La méthode dans la philosophie des mathématiques [Method in the philosophy of mathematics], Paris: F. Alcan, 1911
