= Soraya Nini =

Soraya Nini is the author of Ils disent que je suis une beurette (1993). The novel was adapted into a film, Samia, directed by Philippe Faucon in 2000.

== Bibliography ==
- Nini, Soraya. Ils disent que je suis une beurette. Paris: Fixot, 1993.

== Sources ==
- IMDb profile, https://www.imdb.com/name/nm0632453/
- McIlvanney, Siobhan. “The articulation of beur female identity in the works of Farida Belghoul, Ferrudja Kessas and Soraya Nini.” In Women’s Writing in Contemporary France: New Writers, New Literatures in the 1990s. Manchester: Manchester University Press, 2002. 130–141.
- “Female Identity in Process in Soraya Nini’s Ils disent que je suis une beurette.” Modern and Contemporary France 6 (1998): 505–17.
- “Radicalising Convention: Feminist Readings of Literature and Language in Soraya Nini’s Ils disent que je suis une beurette.” In Gender and Identities in France 4 (1999): 63–71.
