= Jean-Claude Villain =

French writer

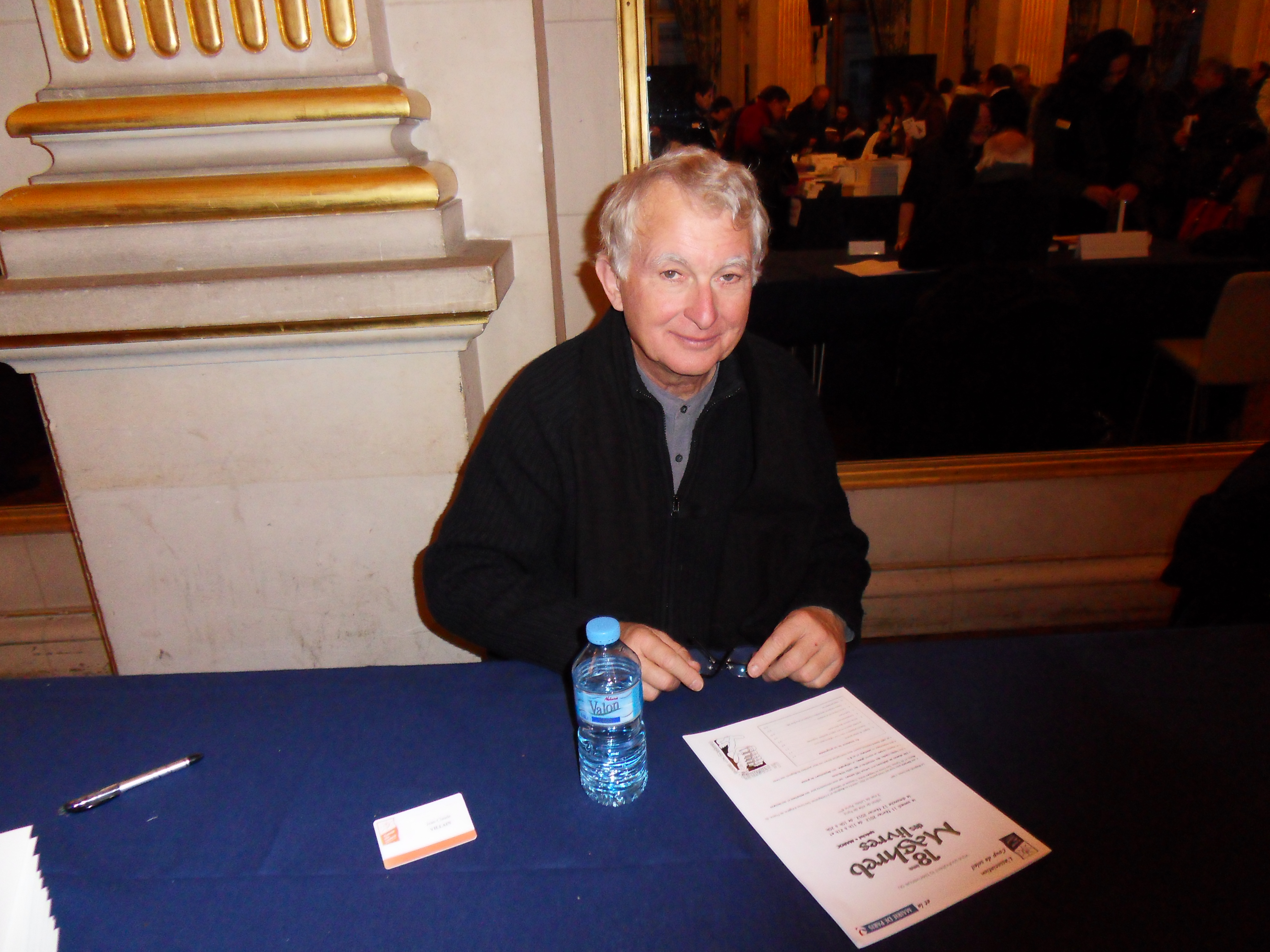

Jean-Claude Villain is a French writer. He was born in Mâcon (France) in 1947.

== Biography ==
Born in Burgundy, he lives on the shores of the Mediterranean sea since 1975, sharing his life between South France and Tunisia. He pursues a varied literary work, mainly focused on the Mediterranean world, whose myths and songs he embraces as well as the tragedy, and which he explores through writing, travels, friendships and translations.

== Works ==
He is the author of around thirty books of poetry (including Parole exil, Le Tombeau des Rois, Leur dit, Thalassa pour un retour.), all accompanied by the contribution of a visual artist, as well as plays, studies on contemporary poets, essays, chronicles, short stories, French versions of foreign poets, and numerous artists' books.

He has long pursued an activity as a literary critic for numerous magazines, both French and foreign, and as a critic in the visual arts. He has participated in festivals and conferences in different countries and gives lectures, public readings and recitals, sometimes accompanied by musicians. His works are translated and published in several languages.

His most recent titles are: Yeux ouverts dans le noir (Eyes open in the dark) (L’Harmattan Publ., Paris), Ithaques (Ithacas) (Le Cormier Publ., Brussels), Lettres du monde (Letters from the world), (Petra Publ., Paris), En regardant en écrivant (En gazing while writing, Orizons Publ., Paris).

== Bibliography ==
=== Poetry ===
Lettres du monde, 2018, Petra.

L'ombre, l'effroi, 2016, Encres vives.

Ithaques, 2011, Le Cormier.

Vrille ce vertige, 2008, Propos 2.

Fragments du fleuve asséché, 2007, L’Arbre à paroles.

Retour au sud, 2003, Tipaza.

Dix stèles et une brisées en un jardin, 1998, Tipaza.

Thalassa pour un retour, 1997, L'Harmattan.

Eté, froide saison, 1996, L'Harmattan.

Sept chants de relevailles, 1994, Encres Vives. (2° éd. 2001).

Orbes, 1993, L'Harmattan.

Et lui grand fauve aimant que l'été traverse, 1993, Unimuse.

Leur Dit, 1992, L'Harmattan.

Le Tombeau des Rois, suivi de Roi, guerrier et mendiant, 1991, L'Harmattan.

Parole, exil, précédé de Confins, 1990, L'Harmattan.

Le schiste des songes, (Lieux II), 1989, Telo Martius.

Le pays d'où je viens s'appelle amour, 1988, Des Aires.

Face à la mer, suivi de Brève Béance, 1987, H.C.

Du côté des terres, 1985, Le Temps parallèle.

Le soleil au plus près, 1984, H.C.

Lieux, 1980, H.C.

Du gel sur les mains, 1979, H.C.

Paroles pour un silence prochain, 1977, Plein Chant.

Terres étreintes, 1977, L'Arbre.

Paroles pour un silence prochain, 1977, Plein Chant.

Au creux de l'oreille, 1974, St Germain des Prés.

=== Prose ===
En regardant en écrivant, 2021, Orizons.

Le monde est beau et nous avons des yeux pour voir, 2005 (3° éd. en 2010), Encres vives.

Yeux ouverts dans le noir, récit poétique, 2003, L’Harmattan.

Aïssawiya, nouvelles, 2003, L'Harmattan.

L’heure de Pan, petites proses, 2002, L’Harmattan.

Marchand d'épices, contes poétiques, 2001, Encres Vives.

Labrys, théâtre, 2001, L'Harmattan.

Écrire au sud, chroniques, 2000, Encres Vives.

Pour Refuge B, théâtre, 2000, Les Cahiers de L'Egaré.

Essais de compréhension mythologique, 1999, L'Harmattan.

Jean-Max Tixier à l'arête des mots, essai, 1995, L'Harmattan.

Matinales de pluie, lettres, 1995, L'Harmattan.

=== In foreign languages ===
Elle dit, bilingue, Greek version from Constance Dima, Fildisi Publ., Athènes, 2023.

Le Tombeau des Rois, Greek version from Constance Dima, Publ. www.eBooks4Greeks.gr, Athènes, 2019.

Le Monde est beau et nous avons des yeux pour voir, Greek version from Constance Dima, Publ. www.eBooks4Greeks.gr, Athènes, 2019.

Thalassa pour un retour, Greek version from Irène Chalkia, Publ. www.eBooks4Greeks.gr, Athènes, 2019.

Labrys, Greek version from Constance Dima, Publ. www.eBooks4Greeks.gr, Athènes, 2019.

Et lui grand fauve aimant que l'été traverse, Greek version from Nicolas Iordanidis, 2011, Lagoudera Publ., Athènes.

Essais de compréhension mythologique, Greek version from Constance Dima, 2005, Anémodeiktis Publ., Athènes.

Et lui grand fauve aimant que l'été traverse, Bulgarian version from Aksinia Maikholova, 2003, Aquarium Méditerranéen Publ., Sofia.

Semelles de vent, title gathering Marchand d’épices and Sept chants de relevailles, Arabic version from Imane Riha, 2003, Anep Publ., Alger.

Le Livre secret, Greek version from Vasso Dermani, (unpublished).

Numerous translations into other languages of extracts from his works have also been published in foreign magazines.

He is the author of more than thirty artists' books in collaboration with contemporary visual artists and he directs a collection of artist's books, Le Livre d'argile, (The Clay book) which he founded in collaboration with the ceramist Marie-José Armando. It includes twenty collaborations with French and foreign poets.

=== Further reading ===
Chantal Danjou: "Jean-Claude Villain, damier de parole et silence", “Jean-Claude Villain, the checkerboard of words and silence “ followed by interviews, 2001, L'Harmattan Publ., Paris.

Constance Dima: "Les formes de l’amour dans l’œuvre de Jean-Claude Villain", “Forms of love in Jean-Claude Villain's work”, Kornilia Sfakianaki Publ., Thessaloniki University (Grèce), 2006.

Special issue: "File Jean-Claude Villain", Editions Encres vives, 2003. (numerous contributors)

Sylvie Besson: "Les traces de l'exil poétique dans l'œuvre de Jean-Claude Villain", Le Nouveau Recueil Publ., 2009, Paris.

A video was dedicated to him by Itiné'art.

== Notes ==
Notice d'autorité de la BNF [archive].

Jean-Claude Villain on literary web sites: Poetas del Mundo, la Société des Gens de Lettres, Le Printemps des poètes, cipM (International Center of Poetry Marseille), Poezibao, Terres de femmes, Les Carnets d'Eucharis, L'Harmattan Publ., https://jcvillain.wixsite.com/jcvillain [archive], French public radio 'France-Culture', etc.

Notices d'autorité: VIAFISNIBnF (données)IdRefLCCNGNDBelgiqueNUKATGrèceWorldCat
