= Adeline Yzac =

French author

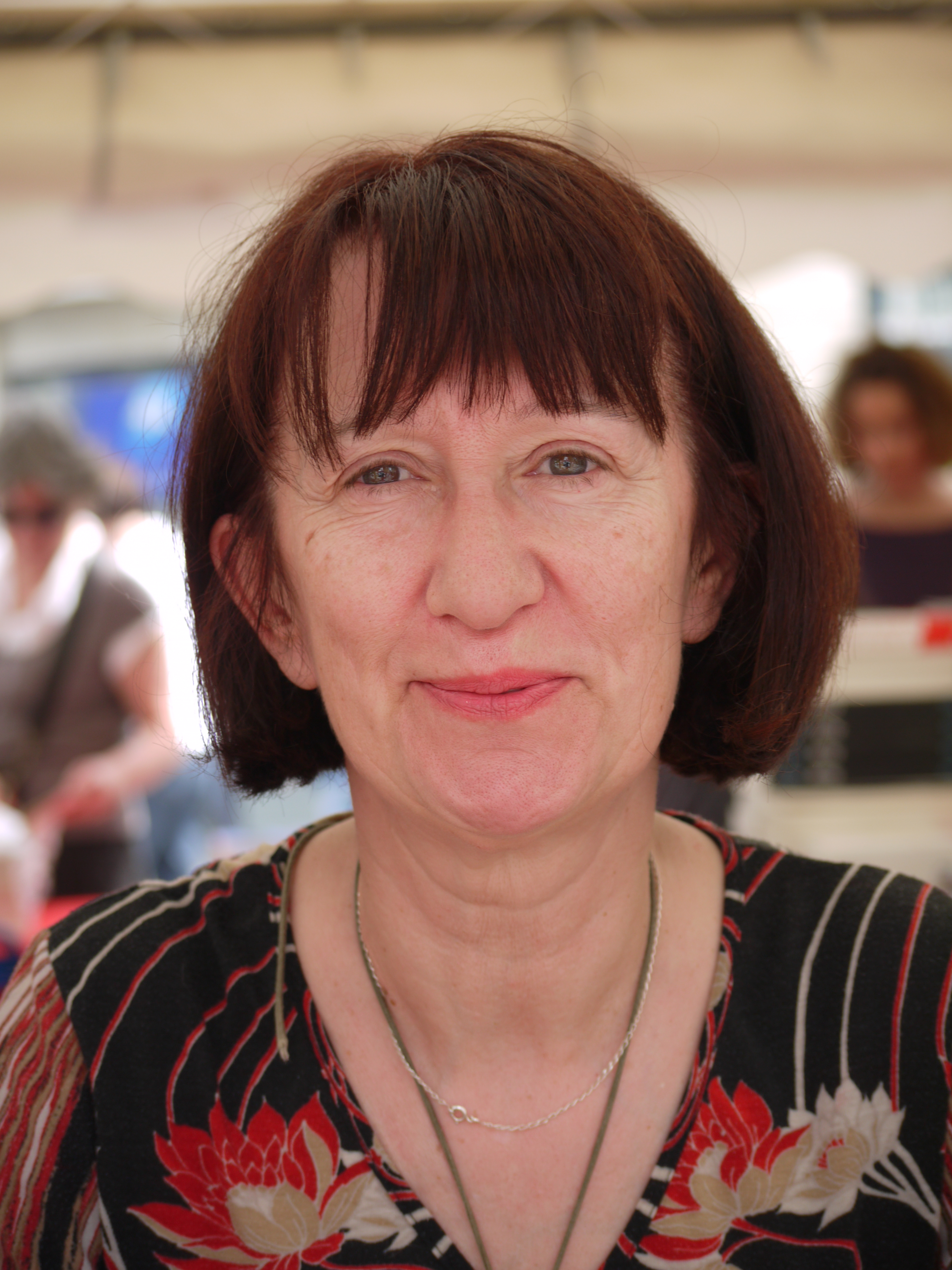
Adeline Yzac in 2010

Adeline Yzac (Occitan: Adelina Yzac, IPA: [ɒdeˈlino̞ iˈza]; born 11 June 1954 in Périgord Noir) is an author who writes in both Occitan and French. She went to school in Sarlat and specialized in literature, Spanish and linguistics at the university of Montpellier. She's also a playwright and a story writer. Her style has always been heavily influenced by the literature of Spain and Spanish-speaking Latin America.

== Bibliography ==
=== Works in Occitan ===
- D'enfança d'en fàcia (Facing Youth), 1998, with the author's French translation
- Un Tren per tu tota sola (A Train for You Only), 2002, with the author's French translation

=== Adult books ===
- La Nuit fut si lente à couler, 1999
- D'enfance d'en face, 1998, awarded the Joan Bodon prize in 1999
- Le Dernier de la lune, 2000, awarded the Alain-Fournier prize in 2001
- Enea la cathare, 2000
- Danse la vigne, 2001.
- Un Train pour toi toute seule, awarded the Jaufre Rudel prize in 2002
- Le Temps d'un retour, 2002
- Mondane de Fénelon, 2003
- Le Jardin de Jeanne, 2005

=== Children's books ===
- Les Larmes de mon père, 1995
- La Légende oubliée, 1996
- Il y avait une fois, 1997
- Histoires courtes et amusantes d'animaux de la ferme followed by Un drôle d'œuf, 1998
- Enéa la cathare, 2000
- Calicobat, 2003
- Tout Doudou Caramel Mou, 2002
- Grain de Riz, 2003
- Le Prince qui voit juste, 2003
- Le Jour des oies sauvages, awarded the Octogones prize in 2004
- La Princesse du jour et le prince de la nuit, 2004
- Le Radeau des poèmes, 2005
- TOC, 2005
- L'Enfant à la bouche de silence, 2006
- Les Trois rives du fleuve, 2006
- L'Almanavache, 2006
