= Djémil Kessous =

French activist

Djémil Kessous (born in 1946) is a retired civil servant who worked for the French Council of State, and a writer of social, and philosophical works He is a son of the Algerian politician Mohamed El Aziz Kessous.

== Biography ==
He has published in French the books La théorie générale de l'évolution (L'Harmattan, ISBN 2-7384-2616-6) and L'Universalisme (Acratie, 1997, ISBN 2-909899-10-1). The latter work was translated into Esperanto by Jacqueline Lépeix under the title "La Universalismo, Sennacieca Asocio Tutmonda, 2002, ISBN 2-9502432-6-6)".

== Selected bibliography ==
- La théorie générale de l'évolution - Le principe néguentropique, L'Harmattan, 1994 ISBN 2-7384-2616-6
- L'Universalisme, Acratie, 1997 ISBN 2-909899-10-1
- La Universalismo, Sennacieca Asocio Tutmonda, 2002 ISBN 2-9502432-6-6
