= Marc Gilbert de Varennes =

French Jesuit priest and writer

- Born: 1591
- Died: 1660 (aged 68–69)
- Occupations: Jesuit priest, writer
- Known for: writings on heraldry
- Notable work: Le Roy d'armes ou L'art de bien former, charger, briser, timbrer, et par consequent, blasonner toutes les fortes d'Armoiries (The King of Arms or The art of properly forming, charging, breaking, stamping, and consequently, emblazoning all the forts of Coats of Arms.''

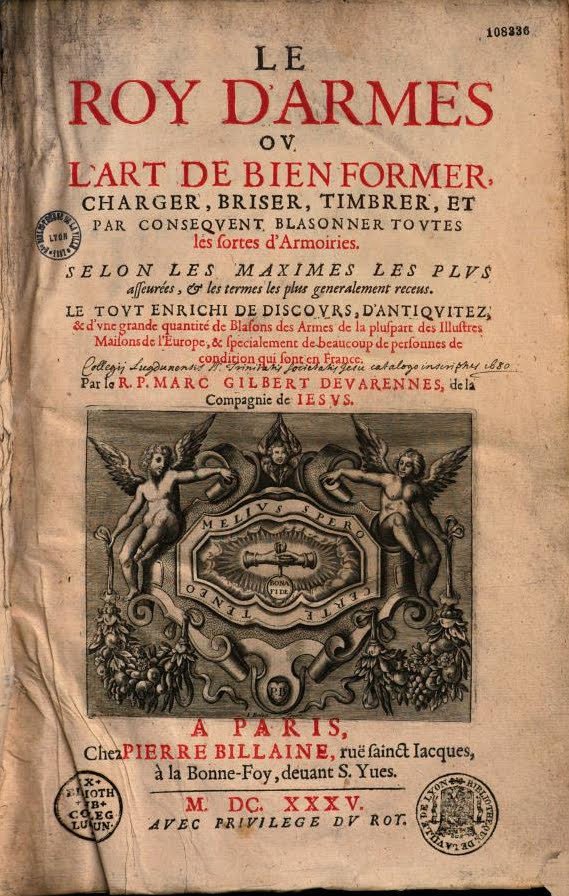
Inside cover of Le Roy d'armes (1635 edition) by Marc Gilbert de Varennes

Marc Gilbert de Varennes (1591–1660,) was a Jesuit priest and a French writer on heraldry from the 17th century. He is best known for his large folio book Le Roy d'armes ou L'art de bien former, charger, briser, timbrer, et par consequent, blasonner toutes les fortes d'Armoiries. The 1st edition was printed in 1635. The second edition was published in Paris by Jean Billaine, in 1640.
