= Luc Perino =

French physician and writer

Luc Perino (born in 1947 in Toulon, France), is a French physician, essayist, and a novelist. He is known for his promotion of general and clinical medicine and of Darwinian medicine.

Perino first practised in rural areas of France. He then went to Central Africa where he practised tropical medicine. He later lived in South China for two years. In 1990, Perino resumed his practice in France and then started to teach clinical medicine and Human and Social Sciences at the University of Lyon, highlighting his classes with his broad experience.

Perino plays the medical doctor in the movie The Consultation shot in 2007 by Hélène de Crecy, a one-hour and half documentary taking place behind closed doors in the office of a general practitioner.

== Books ==
Perino is the author of several essays and novels the main topics of which are medicine and biology, anthropology and the history of science:

- Les nouveaux paradoxes de la médecine (new paradox of medicine), 2012
- A quoi sert vraiment un médecin? (What good is a doctor?), 2011
- Une brève histoire du médicament (A short story of drugs), 2009. An essay about drugs and their history, ranging from the remote times of Homo Sapiens, when they resorted to magic and the divine to the new scientific market dominated by the invading and intrusive drug industry which influences the medical thinking and everyone's behavior.
- Darwin viendra-t-il (Will Darwin Come?), 2008. The setting is Oxford on Saturday 30 June 1860, a few months after the astonishing publication of Charles Darwin's "On the Origin of Species". The British Science Association has set up a debate between the representatives of the Anglican Church and the Science Academy, both hostile to the natural selection theory promoted by Darwin. The author takes advantage of this debate to draw a gallery of portraits of Victorian scientists, religious and public figures.
- Humeurs médicales (Medical humour), 2006
- La sagesse du médecin (The Physician's Wisdom), 2004. The practice of a medical doctor can be seen as an iniatory journey and a way to discover oneself and the world. Each case leaves the physician pondering over life and Perino shows through many examples how simple questions has led him to thinking far from what he had been taught at the Medical school.
- Carnets de santé (Medical Record), 2004
- Le Bobologue, 2001. A neologism which could be translated as "Physician of scratches, sores and pains". Today the healing roles of a physician are multiple: psychiatrist, confessor, healer of many sores and wounds. In the end, the author is inclined to think that after 10.000 years a clinical physician is for his patients a shaman or a wizard.
