= Claude-François-Xavier Mercier de Compiègne =

French writer and translator

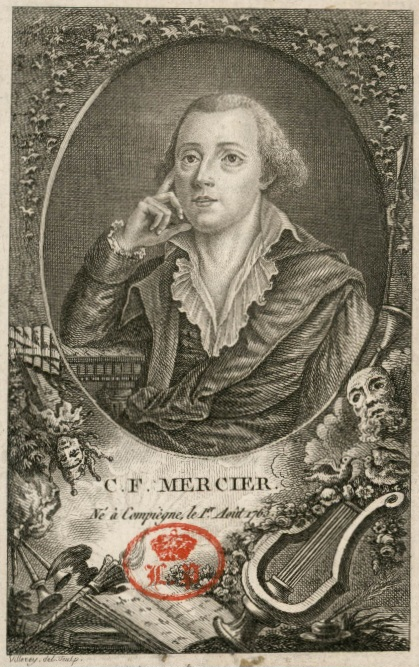
Claude-François-Xavier Mercier de Compiègne

Claude-François-Xavier Mercier de Compiègne (1763–1800) was a French writer and translator.
