= Jean Meuvret =

French historian and university teacher

Jean Meuvret (1901–1971) was a historian of early modern France. He was a tutor at the Ecole Normale Supérieure and was known in Europe and America for his pioneering studies of the French economy in the seventeenth century. His most important work, Le problème des subsistances á l'époque de Louis XIV, examines the corn economy of France during the Old Regime. Meuvret was interested in showing how historical conditions affected different networks of exchange in an early monetary economy.

He was awarded the Latvian Order of the Three Stars 4th Class on 15 November 1935.
