= André-Samuel-Michel Cantwell =

French translator (1744–1802)

André-Samuel-Michel Cantwell (1744–1802) was a French translator.
