= Henri François Marion =

French philosopher and educationalist

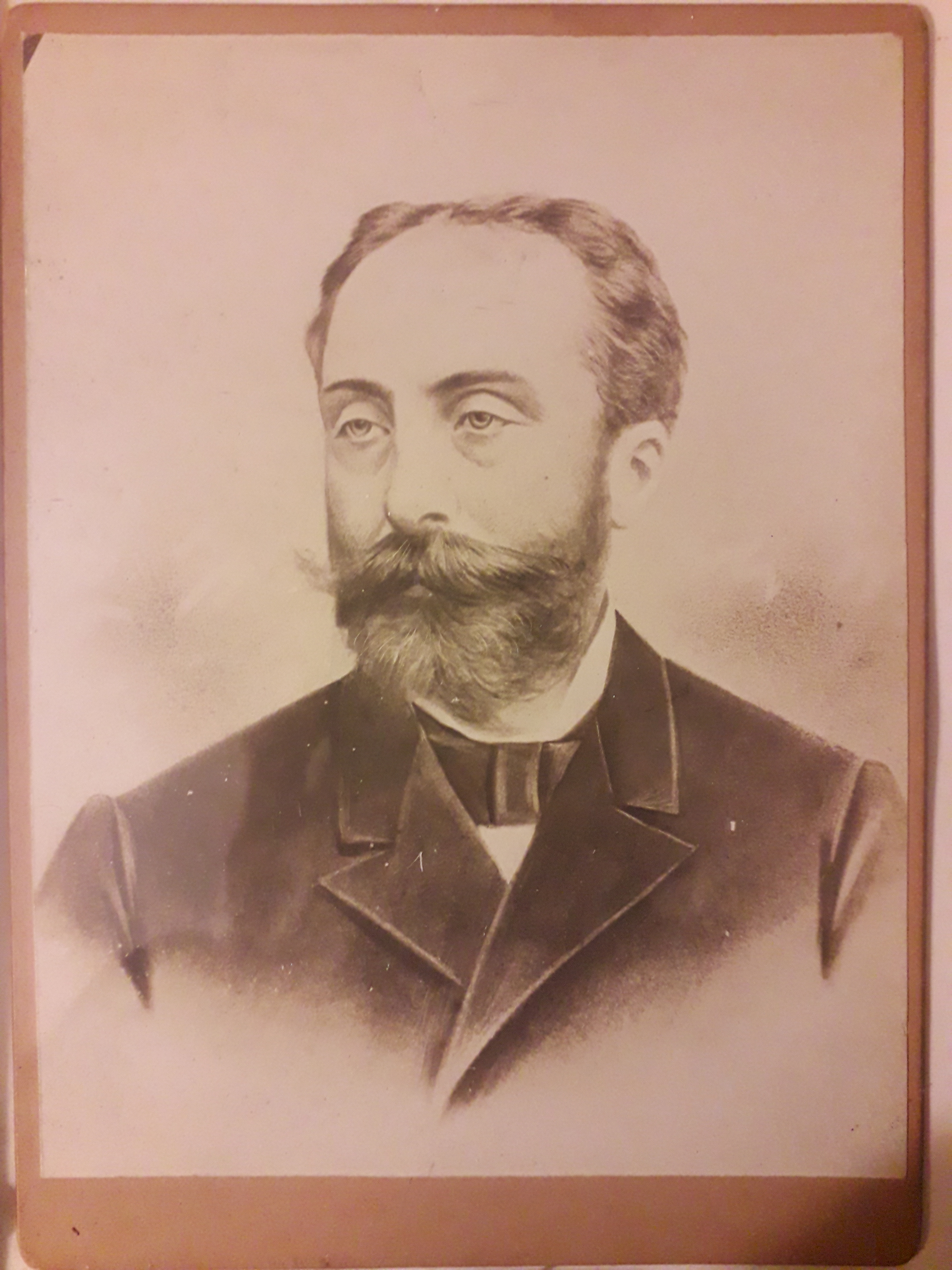

Henri François Marion (1846–1896) was a French philosopher and educationalist.

== Life ==
He was born in Saint-Parize-en-Viry, Nièvre department, on 9 September 1846.

He studied at Nevers, and at the École Normale, where he graduated in 1868. After occupying several minor positions, he returned to Paris in 1875 as professor of the Lycée Henri IV, and in 1880 he became Docteur ès lettres. In the same year he was elected a member of the Council of Public Instruction, and devoted himself to improving the scheme of French education, especially in girls' schools. He was largely instrumental in the foundation of ecoles normales in provincial towns, and himself gave courses of lectures on psychology and practical ethics in their early days. He died in Paris on 5 April 1896.

His chief philosophical works were an edition of the Théodicée of Leibniz (1874), a monograph on John Locke (1878), Devoirs et droits de l'homme (1880), Franciscus Glissonius quid de natura substantiae, seu vita naturae senserit, et utrum Leibnitio de natura substantiae cogitanti quidquam contulerit (1880); and De La solidarite morale (4th ed., 1893). His lectures at L'école normale supérieure de lettres et sciences humaines, Fontenay-aux-Roses have been published in two volumes entitled Leçons de psychologie appliquée a l'éducation, and Leçons de morale; those delivered at the Sorbonne are collected in L'éducation dans l'université (1892).
