= Jean-Didier Urbain =

Jean-Didier Urbain (born 1 August 1951) is a French sociologist, linguist, ethnologist and tourism specialist.

As explains Jean-Didier Urbain, “life with nature embodies the anti-Facebook spirit. A world apart, where we feel we can build authentic social relations with your neighbors, the baker or the teacher of your children.” He has a PhD in social and cultural anthropology from the University Paris-Descartes (Paris 5, 1987), with a thesis on "Le mort-là : anthropologie et séminologie de l'imaginaire de la mort en Occident à partir des ses cimitières" where he currently teaches.

== His books ==
- Paradis verts : désirs de campagne et passions résidentielles, éditions Payot, 2002
- La France des temps libres et des vacances, éditions de l'Aube, Datar, 2002
- Les vacances, éditions Le Cavalier bleu, 2002
- Sur la plage : mœurs et coutumes balnéaires aux XIXe et XXe siècles, éditions Payot, 2002
  - Translated into English as At the Beach Minneapolis : University of Minnesota Press, 2003. ISBN 9780816634514 According to WorldCat, the book is held in 181 libraries
- L'idiot du voyage : histoires de touristes, éditions Payot, 2002 According to WorldCat, the book is held in 148 libraries
- Secrets de voyages : menteurs, imposteurs et autres voyageurs impossibles, éditions Payot, 2003.
- Paradis verts : désirs de campagne et passions résidentielles, éditions Payot, 2008.
- L'envie du monde, éditions Bréal, 2011.
