= Bertrand de Loque =

Bertrand de Loque, author of Deux Traitéz: l'un de la guerre, l'autre du duel (Lyon: Iacob Ratoyre, 1589), Protestant minister, is said to be the same person as François de Saillans, who was born in Valence between 1540 and 1550. Loque was still alive in 1600.

Shakespeare used John Eliot's 1591 translation of Bertrand de Loque's Discourses of Warre and single Combat for inspiration and guidance in two plays, Henry V, and The Reign of King Edward III.
