= 17th-century French literature =

Epoch of a European Culture

Louis XIV, King of France and Navarre by Hyacinthe Rigaud (1701)

17th-century French literature was written throughout the Grand Siècle of France, spanning the reigns of Henri, the Regency of Marie de' Medici, Louis XIII, the Regency of Anne of Austria (and the civil war called the Fronde), and the reign of Louis XIV. The literature of this period is often equated with the Classicism of Louis XIV's long reign, during which France led Europe in political and cultural development; its authors expounded the classical ideals of order, clarity, proportion and good taste. In reality, 17th-century French literature encompasses far more than just the classicist masterpieces of Jean Racine and Madame de La Fayette.

== Society and literature in 17th-century France ==
In Renaissance France, literature (in the broadest sense of the term) was largely the product of encyclopaedic humanism, and included works produced by an educated class of writers from religious and legal backgrounds. A new conception of nobility, modelled on the Italian Renaissance courts and their concept of the perfect courtier, was beginning to evolve through French literature. Throughout the 17th century this new concept transformed the image of the rude noble into an ideal of honnête homme ("the upright man") or the bel esprit ("beautiful spirit") whose chief virtues included eloquent speech, skill at dance, refined manners, appreciation of the arts, intellectual curiosity, wit, a spiritual or platonic attitude towards love and the ability to write poetry.

Central to this transformation of literature were the salons and literary academies which flourished during the first decades of the 17th century; the expanded role of noble patronage was also significant. The production of literary works such as poems, plays, works of criticism or moral reflection was increasingly considered a necessary practice by nobles, and the creation (or patronage) of the arts served as a means of social advancement for both non- and marginalized noblemen. In the mid-17th century, there were an estimated 2,200 authors in France (mostly nobles and clergy), writing for a reading public of just a few tens of thousands. Under Cardinal Richelieu, patronage of the arts and literary academies increasingly came under the control of the monarchy.

=== Salons and Academies ===
Henry IV's court was considered by contemporaries a rude one, lacking the Italianate sophistication of the court of the Valois kings. The court also lacked a queen, who traditionally served as a focus (or patron) of a nation's authors and poets. Henry's literary tastes were largely limited to the chivalric novel Amadis of Gaul. In the absence of a national literary culture, private salons formed around upper-class women such as Marie de' Medici and Marguerite de Valois, devoting themselves to discussions of literature and society. In the 1620s, the most famous salon was held at the Hôtel de Rambouillet by Madame de Rambouillet; a rival gathering was organized by Madeleine de Scudéry.

The word salon first appeared in French in 1664 from the Italian word sala, the large reception hall of a mansion. Before 1664, literary gatherings were often called by the name of the room in which they occurred -- cabinet, réduit, alcôve, and ruelle. For instance, the term ruelle derives from literary gatherings held in the bedroom, a practice popular even with Louis XIV. Nobles, lying on their beds, would receive close friends and offer them seats on chairs or stools surrounding the bed. Ruelle ("little street") refers to the space between a bed and the wall in a bedroom; it became a name for these gatherings (and the intellectual and literary circles evolving from them), often under the wing of educated women in the first half of the 17th century.

In the context of French scholastica, academies were scholarly societies which monitored, fostered, and critiqued French culture. Academies first appeared in France during the Renaissance, when Jean-Antoine de Baïf created one devoted to poetry and music, inspired by the academy of Italian Marsilio Ficino. The first half of the 17th century was marked by a phenomenal growth in private academies, organised around a half-dozen or a dozen individuals who met regularly. Academies were generally more formal and more focused on criticism and analysis than salons, which encouraged pleasurable discourse about society. However, certain salons (such as that of Marguerite de Valois) were closer to the academic spirit.

In the mid-17th century, academies gradually came under government control and sponsorship and the number of private academies decreased. The first private academy to fall under governmental control was L'Académie française, which remains the most prestigious governmental academy in France. Founded in 1634 by Cardinal Richelieu, L'Académie française focuses on the French language.

=== Aristocratic codes ===
In certain instances, the values of 17th-century nobility played a major part in the literature of the era. Most notable of these values are the aristocratic obsession with glory (la gloire) and majesty (la grandeur). The spectacle of power, prestige and luxury found in 17th-century literature may be distasteful or even offensive. Corneille's heroes, for example, have been labeled by modern critics as vainglorious, extravagant and prideful; however, contemporary aristocratic readers would see these characters (and their actions) as representative of nobility.

The château of Versailles, court ballets, noble portraits, triumphal arches – all of these were representations of glory and prestige. The notion of glory (whether artistic or military) was not vanity or boastfulness or hubris, but rather a moral imperative for the aristocracy. Nobles were required to be generous, magnanimous and to perform great deeds disinterestedly (i.e. because their status demanded it, without expectations of financial or political gain), and to master their own emotions (especially fear, jealousy and the desire for revenge).

One's status in the world demanded appropriate externalisation ( or "conspicuous consumption"). Nobles indebted themselves to build prestigious urban mansions (hôtels particuliers) and to buy clothes, paintings, silverware, dishes and other furnishings befitting their rank. They were also required to show generosity by hosting sumptuous parties and by funding the arts. Conversely, social parvenus who took on the external trappings of the noble classes (such as the wearing of a sword) were severely criticised, sometimes by legal action (laws concerning sumptuous clothing worn by the bourgeois existed since the Middle Ages). These aristocratic values began to be criticised in the mid-17th century; Blaise Pascal, for example, offered a ferocious analysis of the spectacle of power and François de La Rochefoucauld posited that no human act—however generous it pretended to be—could be considered disinterested.

=== Classicism ===
In an attempt to restrict the proliferation of private centers of intellectual or literary life (so as to impose the royal court as the artistic center of France), Cardinal Richelieu took an existing literary gathering (around Valentin Conrart) and designated it as the official Académie française in 1634. Other original members included Jean Desmarets de Saint-Sorlin, Jean Ogier de Gombauld, Jean Chapelain, François le Métel de Boisrobert, François Maynard, Marin le Roy de Gomberville and Nicolas Faret; members added at the time of its official creation included Jean-Louis Guez de Balzac, Claude Favre de Vaugelas and Vincent Voiture. This process of state control of the arts and literature would be expanded even more during the reign of Louis XIV.

"Classicism" (as it applies to literature) implies notions of order, clarity, moral purpose and good taste. Many of these notions are directly inspired by the works of Aristotle and Horace, and by classical Greek and Roman masterpieces. In theater, a play should follow the Three Unities:

- Unity of place: The setting should not change. In practice this led to the frequent "Castle, interior". Battles take place off stage.
- Unity of time: Ideally, the entire play should take place in 24 hours.
- Unity of action: There should be one central story, and all secondary plots should link to it.

Although based on classical examples, the unities of place and time were seen as essential for the spectator's complete absorption into the dramatic action; wildly dispersed scenes in China or Africa, or over many years would—critics maintained—break the theatrical illusion. Sometimes, grouped with unity of action is the notion that no character should appear unexpectedly late in the drama.

Linked with the theatrical unities are the following concepts:

- Les bienséances (decorum): Literature should respect moral codes and good taste; nothing should be presented that flouts these codes, even if they are historical events.
- La vraisemblance: Actions should be believable. When historical events contradict believability, some critics advised the latter. The criterion of believability was sometimes used to criticize soliloquy; in late classical plays characters are almost invariably supplied with confidants (valets, friends, nurses), to whom they reveal their emotions.

These rules precluded many elements common in the baroque tragi-comedy: flying horses, chivalric battles, magical trips to foreign lands and the deus ex machina; the mauling of Hippolyte by a monster in Phèdre could only take place offstage. Finally, literature and art should consciously follow Horace's precept "to please and educate" (aut delectare aut prodesse est).

These rules (or codes) were seldom completely followed, and many of the 17th century's masterpieces broke these rules intentionally to heighten emotional effect:

- Corneille's Le Cid was criticised for having Rodrigue appear before Chimène after having killed her father, a violation of moral codes.
- La Princesse de Clèves' revelation to her husband of her adulterous feelings for the Duc de Nemours was criticised for being unbelievable.

In 1674 there erupted an intellectual debate (la querelle des Anciens et des Modernes) on whether the arts and literature of the modern era had achieved more than the illustrious writers and artists of antiquity. The Académy was dominated by the "Moderns" (Charles Perrault, Jean Desmarets de Saint-Sorlin) and Perrault's poem "Le Siècle de Louis le Grand" ("The Century of Louis the Great") in 1687 was the strongest expression of their conviction that the reign of Louis XIV was the equal of Augustus. As a great lover of the classics, Nicolas Boileau-Despréaux found himself pushed into the role of champion of the Anciens (his severe criticisms of Desmarets de Saint-Sorlin's poems did not help), and Jean Racine, Jean de La Fontaine and Jean de La Bruyère took his defense. Meanwhile, Bernard le Bovier de Fontenelle and the newspaper Mercure galant joined the "Moderns". The debate would last until the beginning of the 18th century.

The term "classicism" is also linked to the visual arts and architecture of the period where it is also known as Louis XIV style, most specifically to the construction of the Palace of Versailles (the crowning achievement of an official program of propaganda and regal glory). Although originally a country retreat used for special festivities—and known more for André Le Nôtre's gardens and fountains—Versailles eventually became the permanent home of the king. By relocating to Versailles Louis effectively avoided the dangers of Paris (in his youth, Louis XIV had suffered during the civil and parliamentary insurrection known as the Fronde), and could also keep his eye closely on the affairs of the nobles and play them off against each other and against the newer noblesse de robe. Versailles became a gilded cage; to leave spelled disaster for a noble, for all official charges and appointments were made there. A strict etiquette was imposed; a word or glance from the king could make or destroy a career. The king himself followed a strict daily regimen, and there was little privacy. Through his wars and the glory of Versailles Louis became, to a certain degree, the arbiter of taste and power in Europe; both his château and the etiquette in Versailles were copied by the other European courts. However, the difficult wars at the end of his long reign and the religious problems created by the revocation of the Edict of Nantes made the last years dark.

== Prose ==
=== Les Amours and Les histoires tragiques ===
In France, the period following the Wars of Religion saw the appearance of a new form of narrative fiction (which some critics have termed the "sentimental novel"), which quickly became a literary sensation thanks to the enthusiasm of a reading public searching for entertainment after so many years of conflict. These short (and realistic) novels of love (or amours, as they are frequently called in the titles) included extensive examples of gallant letters and polite discourse, amorous dialogues, letters and poems inserted in the story, gallant conceits and other rhetorical figures. These texts played an important role in the elaboration of new modes of civility and discourse of the upper classes (leading to the notion of the noble honnête homme). None of these novels have been republished since the early 17th century, and they remain largely unknown today. Authors associated with les Amours were Antoine de Nervèze, Nicolas des Escuteaux and François du Souhait. Meanwhile, the tradition of the dark tale—coming from the tragic short story (histoire tragique) associated with Bandello, and frequently ending in suicide or murder—continued in the works of Jean-Pierre Camus and François de Rosset.

=== The Baroque adventure novel ===
By 1610 the short novel of love had largely disappeared, as tastes returned to longer adventure novels (romans d'aventures) and their clichés (pirates, storms, kidnapped maidens) that had been popular since the Valois court. Amadis of Gaul was the favorite reading matter of Henri IV; Béroalde de Verville was still writing, and Nicolas de Montreux had just died in 1608. Both Nervèze and Des Escuteaux in their later works attempted multi-volume adventure novels, and over the next twenty years the priest Jean-Pierre Camus adapted the form to tell harrowing moral tales heavily influenced by the histoire tragique. The best known of these long adventure novels is perhaps Polexandre (1629–49) by the young author Marin le Roy de Gomberville.

All these authors were eclipsed, however, by the international success of Honoré d'Urfé's novel l'Astrée (1607–1633). This story centered on the shepherd Céladon and his love, Astrée, and combined a frame tale device of shepherds and maidens meeting, telling stories and philosophizing on love (a form derived from the ancient Greek novel "the Aethiopica" by Heliodorus of Emesa) with a pastoral setting (derived from the Spanish and Italian pastoral tradition from such writers as Jacopo Sannazaro, Jorge de Montemayor, Torquato Tasso and Giambattista Guarini) of noble, idealized shepherds and maidens tending their flocks and falling in (and out of) love. The influence of d'Urfé's novel was immense, especially in its discursive structure (which permitted a large number of stories and characters to be introduced and their resolution to be delayed for thousands of pages; a roman à tiroirs). D'Urfé's novel also promoted a rarefied neo-Platonism, which differed profoundly from the physicality of the knights in the Renaissance novel (such as Amadis of Gaul). The only element of d'Urfé's work which did not produce imitations was its roman pastoral setting.

In theorizing the origins of the novel, the early 17th century conceived of the form as "an epic in prose"; in truth, the epic poem at the end of the Renaissance had few thematic differences from the novel. Novelistic love had spilled into the epic, and adventurous knights had become the subject of novels. The novels from 1640 to 1660 would complete this melding. These novels contained multiple volumes and were structurally complicated, using the same techniques of inserted stories and tale-within-a-tale dialogues as d'Urfé. Often called romans de longue haleine (or "deep-breath books"), they usually took place in ancient Rome, Egypt or Persia, used historical characters (for this reason they are called romans héroiques) and told the adventures of a series of perfect lovers sent (by accident or misfortune) to the four corners of the world. Unlike the chivalric romance, magical elements and creatures were relatively rare. Furthermore, there was a concentration in these works on psychological analysis and on moral and sentimental questions which the Renaissance novel lacked. Many of these novels were actually romans à clé which described actual contemporary relationships under disguised novelistic names and characters. The most famous of these authors and novels are:

- Madeleine de Scudéry (1607–1701)
  - Ibrahim, ou l'illustre Bassa (4 vols. 1641)
  - Artamène, ou le Grand Cyrus (10 vols. 1648–1653)
  - Clélie, histoire romaine (10 vols. 1654–1661)
  - Almahide, ou l'esclave reine (8 vols. 1661–1663)
- Roland Le Vayer de Boutigny (1627–1685)
  - Mithridate (1648–51)
- Gauthier de Costes, seigneur de la Calprenède
  - Cassandre (10 vols. 1642–1645)
  - Cleopatre (1646–57)
  - Faramond (1661)

=== Baroque comic fiction ===
Not all fiction of the first half of the 17th century was a wild flight of fancy in far-flung lands and rarefied, adventurous love stories. Influenced by the international success of the picaresque novel from Spain (such as Lazarillo de Tormes), and by Miguel de Cervantes' short-story collection Exemplary Tales (which appeared in French beginning in 1614) and Don Quixote de la Mancha (French translation 1614–1618), the French novelists of the first half of the 17th century also chose to describe and satirize their own era and its excesses. Other important satirical models were provided by Fernando de Rojas' La Celestina and John Barclay's (1582–1621) two satirical Latin works, Euphormio sive Satiricon (1602) and Argenis (1621).

Agrippa d'Aubigné's Les Aventures du baron de Faeneste portrays the rude manners and comic adventures of a Gascon in the royal court. Charles Sorel's L'histoire comique de Francion is a picaresque-inspired story of the ruses and amorous dealings of a young gentleman; his Le Berger extravagant is a satire of the d'Urfé-inspired pastoral, which (taking a clue from the end of Don Quixote) has a young man take on the life of a shepherd. Despite their "realism" Sorel's works remain highly baroque, with dream sequences and inserted narration (for example, when Francion tells of his years at school) typical of the adventure novel. This use of inserted stories also follows Cervantes, who inserted a number of nearly autonomous stories into his Quixote. Paul Scarron's most famous work, Le Roman comique, uses the narrative frame of a group of ambulant actors in the provinces to present both scenes of farce and sophisticated, inserted tales.

Cyrano de Bergerac (made famous by Edmond Rostand's 19th-century play) wrote two novels which, 60 years before Gulliver's Travels or Voltaire (or science fiction), use a journey to magical lands (the moon and the sun) as pretexts for satirizing contemporary philosophy and morals. By the end of the 17th century, Cyrano's works would inspire a number of philosophical novels, in which Frenchmen travel to foreign lands and strange utopias. The early half of the 17th century also saw the continued popularity of the comic short story and collections of humorous discussions, typified by the Histoires comiques of François du Souhait; the playful, chaotic, sometimes-obscene and almost-unreadable Moyen de parvenir by Béroalde de Verville (a parody of "table talk" books, of Rabelais and of Michel de Montaigne's The Essays); the anonymous Les Caquets de l'accouchée (1622); and Molière d'Essertine's Semaine amoureuse (a collection of short stories).

A select list of baroque comique writers and works includes:

- Agrippa d'Aubigné (1552–1630)
  - Les Aventures du baron de Faeneste (1617, 1619, 1630)
- Béroalde de Verville (1556–1626)
  - Le Moyen de parvenir (c. 1610) (with game that manages the composition and interchangeable gags, the book teaches boys mainly girls living in a good way)
- François du Souhait (c.1570/80 –1617)
  - Histoires comiques (1612)
- Molière d'Essertine (c.1600–1624)
  - Semaine amoureuse (1620)
- Charles Sorel (1602–1674)
  - L'histoire comique de Francion (1622)
  - Nouvelles françoises (1623)
  - Le Berger extravagant (1627)
- Jean de Lannel
  - Le Roman satyrique (1624)
- Antoine-André Mareschal
  - La Chrysolite (1627)
- Paul Scarron (1610–1660)
  - Virgile travesti (1648–53)
  - Le Roman comique (1651–57)
- Cyrano de Bergerac (Hector Savinien) (1619–1655)
  - Histoire comique des Etats et Empires de la Lune (1657)
  - Histoire comique des Etats et Empires du Soleil (1662)

In the second half of the 17th century, contemporary settings would be also used in many classical nouvelles (novellas—especially as a moral critique of contemporary society).

=== The Nouvelle classique ===
By 1660, the multi-volume, baroque historical novel had largely fallen out of fashion. The tendency was for much shorter works (nouvelles or petits romans), without complex structure or adventurous elements (pirates, shipwrecks, kidnappings). This movement away from the baroque novel was supported by theoretical discussions on novel structure, which sought to apply the same Aristotelian and Horacian concepts of the three unities, decorum and verisimilitude that writers had imposed on the theater. For example, Georges de Scudéry, in his preface to Ibrahim (1641), suggested that a "reasonable limit" for a novel's plot (a form of "unity of time") would be one year. Similarly, in his discussion on La Princesse de Clèves, the chevalier de Valincourt criticized the inclusion of ancillary stories within the main plot (a form of "unity of action").

An interest in love, psychological analysis, moral dilemmas and social constraints permeates these novels. When the action was placed in an historical setting, this was increasingly a setting in the recent past; although still filled with anachronisms, these nouvelles historiques demonstrated an interest in historical detail. A number of these short novels recounted the "secret history" of a famous event (like Villedieu's Annales galantes), linking the action to an amorous intrigue; these were called histoires galantes. Some of these short novels told stories of the contemporary world (such as Préchac's L'Illustre Parisienne).

Important nouvelles classiques were:

- Jean Renaud de Segrais Nouvelles françoises (1658)
- Madame de Lafayette La princesse de Montpensier (1662)
- Madame de Villedieu Journal amoureux (1669)
- Jean Donneau de Visé Nouvelles galantes et comiques (1669)
- Madame de Villedieu Annales galantes (1670)
- Madame de Lafayette Zaïde (1671)
- Madame de Villedieu Amour des grands hommes (1671)
- César Vichard de Saint-Réal Don Carlos (1672)
- Madame de Villedieu Les Désordres de l'amour (1675)
- Jean de Préchac L'Héroïne mousquetaire (1677)
- Jean de Préchac Le voyage de Fontainebleau (1678)
- Madame de Lafayette La Princesse de Clèves (1678)
- Jean de Préchac L'Illustre Parisienne, histoire galante et véritable (1679)

The best-known of all of these is Madame de Lafayette's La Princesse de Clèves. Reduced to essentially three characters, the short novel tells the story of a married noblewoman during the reign of Henri II who falls in love with another man, but who reveals her passion to her husband. Although the novel includes several inserted stories, on the whole the narration concentrates on the unspoken doubts and fears of the two individuals living in a social setting dominated by etiquette and moral correctness; despite its historical setting, Lafayette was clearly describing her contemporary world. The psychological analysis is close to the pessimism of La Rochefoucauld, and the abnegation of the main character leads ultimately to a refusal of a conventional happy ending. For all of its force, Madame de Lafayette's novel is not the first to have a recent historical setting or psychological depth (as some critics contend); these elements may be found in novels of the previous decade, and are already present in certain of the Amours at the beginning of the 17th century.

=== Other novelistic forms after 1660 ===
The concerns of the nouvelle classique (love, psychological analysis, moral dilemmas and social constraints) are also apparent in the anonymous epistolary novel Lettres d'une religieuse portugaise (Letters of a Portuguese Nun) (1668), sometimes attributed to Guilleragues, which were a sensation when they were published (in part because of their perceived authenticity). These letters, written by a scorned woman to her absent lover, were a powerful representation of amorous passion with many similarities to the language of Racine. Other epistolary novels followed by Claude Barbin, Vincent Voiture, Edmé Boursault, Fontenelle (who used the form to introduce discussion of philosophical and moral matters, prefiguring Montesquieu's Lettres persanes in the 18th century) and others; actual love letters written by noble ladies (Madame de Bussy-Lameth, Madame de Coligny) were also published. Antoine Furetière (1619–1688) is responsible for a longer comic novel which pokes fun at a bourgeois family, Le Roman bourgeois (1666). The choice of the bourgeois arriviste or parvenu (a social climber, trying to ape the manners and style of the noble classes) as a source of mockery appears in a number of short stories and theater of the period (such as Molière's Bourgeois Gentihomme). The long adventurous novel of love continued to exist after 1660, albeit in a far shorter form than the novels of the 1640s. Influenced as much by the nouvelles historiques and nouvelles galantes as by the romans d'aventures and romans historiques, these historical novels—whose settings range from ancient Rome to Renaissance Castille or France—were published into the first decades of the 18th century. Authors include Madame Marie Catherine d'Aulnoy, Mlle Charlotte-Rose de Caumont La Force, Mlle Anne de La Roche-Guilhem, Catherine Bernard and Catherine Bédacier-Durand.

A history of the novel, Traitté de l'origine des romans (1670), was written by Pierre Daniel Huet. This work (much like theoretical discussions on theatrical vraisemblance, bienséance and the nature of tragedy and comedy) stressed the need for moral utility; it made important distinctions between history and the novel, and between the epic (which treats of politics and war) and the novel (which treats of love). The first half of the 17th century had seen the development of the biographical mémoire (see below), and by the 1670s this form began to be used in novels. Madame de Villedieu (real name Marie-Catherine Desjardins), author of a number of nouvelles, also wrote a longer realistic work which represented (and satirized) the contemporary world via the fictionalized mémoires of young woman recounting her amorous and economic hardships, Mémoires de la vie d'Henriette Sylvie de Molière (1672–1674).

The fictional mémoire form was used by other novelists as well. Courtilz de Sandras' novels (Mémoires de M.L.C.D.R. in 1687, Mémoires de M. d'Artagnan in 1700 and Mémoires de M. de B. in 1711) describe the world of Richelieu and Mazarin without gallant clichés; spies, kidnappings and political machinations predominate. Among the other mémoires of the period the best-known was the work of Englishman Anthony Hamilton, whose Mémoires de la vie du comte de Grammont... (telling of his years in the French court from 1643 to 1663) was published in France in 1713. Many of these works were published anonymously; in some cases it is difficult to tell whether they are fictionalized or biographical. Other authors include abbé Cavard, abbé de Villiers, abbé Olivier and le sieur de Grandchamp. The realism (and occasional irony) of these novels would lead directly to those of Alain-René Lesage, Pierre de Marivaux and Abbé Prévost in the 18th century.

In the 1690s, the fairy tale began to appear in French literature. The best-known collection of traditional tales (liberally adapted) was by Charles Perrault (1697), although many others were published (such as those by Henriette-Julie de Murat and Madame d'Aulnoy). A major revolution would occur with the appearance of Antoine Galland's first French (and indeed modern) translation of the Thousand and One Nights (or Arabian Nights) (in 1704; another translation appeared in 1710–12), which would influence the 18th-century short stories of Voltaire, Diderot and many others.

The period also saw several novels with voyages and utopian descriptions of foreign cultures (in imitation of Cyrano de Bergerac, Thomas More and Francis Bacon):

- Denis Vairasse – Histoire de Sévarambes (1677)
- Gabriel de Foigny – Les Avantures de Jacques Sadeur dans la découverte et le voyage de la Terre australe (or la Terre australe connue (1676)
- Tyssot de Patot – Voyages et Aventures de Jacques Massé (1710)

Of similar didactic aim was Fénelon's Les Aventures de Télémaque (1694—96), which represents a classicist's attempt to overcome the excesses of the baroque novel; using a structure of travels and adventures (grafted onto Telemachus—the son of Ulysses), Fénelon exposes his moral philosophy. This novel would be emulated by other didactic novels during the 18th century.

== Poetry ==
Because of the new conception of l'honnête homme (the honest or upright man), poetry became one of the principal genres of literary production of noble gentlemen and the non-noble professional writers in their patronage during the 17th century. Poetry was used for all purposes. A great deal of 17th- and 18th-century poetry was "occasional", meaning that it was written to celebrate a particular event (a marriage, birth or a military victory) or to solemnize a tragic occurrence (a death or a military defeat); this type of poetry was favored by gentlemen in the service of a noble or the king. Poetry was the chief form of 17th-century theater; the vast majority of scripted plays were written in verse (see "Theater" below). Poetry was used in satires (Nicolas Boileau-Despréaux is famous for his Satires (1666)) and epics (inspired by the Renaissance epic tradition and by Tasso) like Jean Chapelain's La Pucelle.

Although French poetry during the reign of Henri IV and Louis XIII was still largely inspired by the poets of the late Valois court, some of their excesses and poetic liberties found censure—especially in the work of François de Malherbe, who criticized La Pléiade's and Philippe Desportes's irregularities of meter or form (the suppression of the cesura by a hiatus, sentence clauses spilling over into the next line—enjambement—neologisms constructed from Greek words, etc.). The later 17th century would see Malherbe as the grandfather of poetic classicism. The Pléiade poems of the natural world (fields and streams) were continued in the first half of the century—but the tone was often elegiac or melancholy (an "ode to solitude"), and the natural world presented was sometimes the seacoast or some other rugged environment—by poets who have been tagged by later critics with the "baroque" label (notably Théophile de Viau and Antoine Gérard de Saint-Amant).

Poetry came to be a part of the social games in noble salons (see "salons" above), where epigrams, satirical verse, and poetic descriptions were all common (the most famous example is "La Guirlande de Julie" (1641) at the Hôtel de Rambouillet, a collection of floral poems written by the salon members for the birthday of the host's daughter). The linguistic aspects of the phenomenon associated with the précieuses (similar to Euphuism in England, Gongorism in Spain and Marinism in Italy)—the use of highly metaphorical (sometimes obscure) language, the purification of socially unacceptable vocabulary—was tied to this poetic salon spirit and would have an enormous impact on French poetic and courtly language. Although préciosité was often mocked (especially in the late 1660s, when the phenomenon had spread to the provinces) for its linguistic and romantic excesses (often linked to a misogynistic disdain for intellectual women), the French language and social manners of the 17th century were permanently changed by it.

From the 1660s, three poets stand out. Jean de La Fontaine gained enormous celebrity through his Aesop and Phaedrus-inspired "Fables" (1668–1693), which were written in an irregular-verse form (different meter lengths are used in a poem). Jean Racine was seen as the greatest tragedy writer of his age. Finally, Nicolas Boileau-Despréaux became the theorizer of poetic classicism. His Art poétique (1674) praised reason and logic (Boileau elevated Malherbe as the first of the rational poets), believability, moral usefulness and moral correctness; it elevated tragedy and the poetic epic as the great genres and recommended imitation of the poets of antiquity. "Classicism" in poetry would dominate until the pre-romantics and the French Revolution.

A select list of French poets of the 17th century includes:

- François de Malherbe (1555–1628)
- Honoré d'Urfé (1567–1625)
- Jean Ogier de Gombaud (1570?–1666)
- Mathurin Régnier (1573–1613), nephew of Philippe Desportes
- François de Maynard (1582–1646)
- Honorat de Bueil, seigneur de Racan (1589–1670)
- Théophile de Viau (1590–1626)
- François le Métel de Boisrobert (1592–1662)
- Antoine Gérard de Saint-Amant (1594–1661)
- Jean Chapelain (1595–1674)
- Vincent Voiture (1597–1648)
- Jacques Vallee, Sieur Des Barreaux (1599–1673)
- Tristan L'Hermite (1601?–1655)
- Pierre Corneille (1606–1684)
- Paul Scarron (1610–1660)
- Isaac de Benserade (1613–1691)
- Georges de Brébeuf (1618–1661)
- Jean de La Fontaine (1621–1695)
- Nicolas Boileau-Despréaux (1636–1711)
- Jean Racine (1639–1699)
- Guillaume Amfrye de Chaulieu (1639–1720)
- Jean-François Regnard (1655–1709)

== Theater ==
=== Theaters and theatrical companies ===
During the Middle Ages and the Renaissance, public theatrical productions in Paris were under the control of guilds. During the last decades of the 16th century, only one of these continued to exist; although les Confrères de la Passion no longer had the right to perform mystery plays ( since 1548), they were given exclusive rights to oversee all theatrical productions in the capital and rented out their theater (the Hôtel de Bourgogne) to theatrical troupes for a steep price. In 1599 the guild abandoned its privilege, which permitted other theaters and theatrical companies to operate in the capital. In addition to public theaters, plays were produced in private residences, before the court and in the university. In the first half of the 17th century the public, the humanist theater of the colleges and the theater performed at court exhibited a diversity of tastes; for example, while the tragicomedy was fashionable at the court during the first decade, the public was more interested in tragedy. Early theaters in Paris were often placed in existing structures like tennis courts; their stages were narrow, and facilities for sets and scene changes were often non-existent (this would encourage the development of unity of place). Eventually theaters would develop systems of elaborate machines and decors, fashionable for the chevaleresque flights of knights found in the tragicomedies of the first half of the 17th century.

In the early part of the 17th century, theater performances took place twice a week, starting at two or three o'clock. Theatrical representations often encompassed several works; they began with a comic prologue, then a tragedy or tragicomedy, then a farce and finally a song. Nobles sometimes sat at the side of the stage during the performance. Since it was impossible to lower the house lights the audience was always aware of each other, and spectators were notably vocal during performances. The place directly in front of the stage, without seats—the parterre—was reserved for men, but since these were the cheapest tickets the parterre was usually a mix of social groups. Elegant people watched the show from the galleries. Princes, musketeers and royal pages were given free admission. Before 1630, an "honest" woman did not go to the theater. Unlike England, France placed no restrictions on women performing on stage; however, the career of actors of either sex was seen as morally wrong by the Catholic Church (actors were excommunicated) and by the ascetic religious Jansenist movement. Actors typically had stage names referring to typical roles or stereotypical characters.

In addition to scripted comedies and tragedies, Parisians were also great fans of the Italian acting troupe who performed their Commedia dell'arte, a kind of improvised theater based on types. The characters from the Commedia dell'arte would have a profound effect on French theater, and one finds echoes of them in the braggarts, fools, lovers, old men and wily servants which still populate French theater. Finally, opera reached France during the second half of the 17th century.

The most important theaters and troupes in Paris were:

- Hôtel de Bourgogne – Until 1629 this theater was occupied by various troupes, including the Comédiens du Roi directed by Vallerin Lecomte and (at his death) by Bellerose (Pierre Le Messier). The troupe became the official Troupe Royale in 1629. Actors included Turlupin, Gros-Guillaume, Gautier-Gargouille, Floridor, Monfleury and la Champmeslé.
- Théâtre du Marais (1600–1673) – This rival theater of the Hôtel de Bourgogne housed the troupe Vieux Comédiens du Roi around Claude Deschamps and the troupe of Jodelet.
- La troupe de Monsieur – Under the protection of Louis XIV's brother, this was Molière's first Paris troupe. It moved to several theaters in Paris (the Petit-Bourbon and the Palais-Royal) before combining in 1673 with the troupe of the Théâtre du Marais and becoming the troupe of the Hôtel Guénégaud.
- La Comédie française – In 1680, Louis XIV united the Hôtel de Bourgogne and the Hôtel Guénégaud into one official troupe.

Outside Paris, in the suburbs and the provinces, there were many wandering theatrical troupes; Molière got his start in such a troupe. The royal court and other noble houses were also important organizers of theatrical representations, ballets de cour, mock battles and other forms of divertissement for their festivities; in the some cases, the roles of dancers and actors were held by the nobles themselves. The early years at Versailles—before the massive expansion of the residence—were entirely devoted to such pleasures, and similar spectacles continued throughout the reign. Engravings show Louis XIV and the court seated outside before the Cour du marbre of Versailles, watching the performance of a play.

The great majority of scripted plays in the 17th century were written in verse. Notable exceptions include some of Molière's comedies; Samuel Chappuzeau, author of Le Théâtre François, printed one comedy play in both prose and verse at different times. Except for lyric passages in these plays, the meter used was a twelve-syllable alexandrine line with a regular pause (or cesura) after the sixth syllable. These lines were put into rhymed couplets; couplets alternated between "feminine" (i.e. ending in a mute e) and "masculine" (i.e. ending in a vowel other than a mute e, a consonant or a nasal vowel) rhymes.

=== Baroque theater ===
17th-century French theater is often reduced to three great names—Pierre Corneille, Molière and Jean Racine—and to the triumph of "classicism". The truth, however, is far more complicated. Theater at the beginning of the 17th century was dominated by the genres and dramatists of the previous generation; most influential in this respect was Robert Garnier. Although the royal court had grown tired of the tragedy (preferring the more-escapist tragicomedy), the theatergoing public preferred the former. This would change in the 1630s and 1640s when (influenced by the long baroque novels of the period) the tragicomedy—a heroic and magical adventure of knights and maidens—became the dominant genre. The amazing success of Corneille's Le Cid in 1637 and Horace in 1640 would bring the tragedy back into fashion, where it would remain for the rest of the 17th century.

The most important source for tragic theater was Seneca and the precepts of Horace and Aristotle (plus modern commentaries by Julius Caesar Scaliger and Lodovico Castelvetro); plots were taken from classical authors such as Plutarch and Suetonius, and from Italian, French and Spanish short-story collections. The Greek tragic authors (Sophocles and Euripides) would become increasingly important by the middle of the 17th century. Important models for the 17th century's comedy, tragedy and tragicomedy were also supplied by the Spanish playwrights Pedro Calderón de la Barca, Tirso de Molina and Lope de Vega, many of whose works were translated and adapted for the French stage. Important theatrical models were also supplied by the Italian stage (including the pastoral) and Italy was also an important source for theoretical discussions on theater, especially regarding decorum (see, for example, the debates on Sperone Speroni's play Canace and Giovanni Battista Giraldi's play Orbecche).

Regular comedies (i.e. comedies in five acts modeled on Plautus or Terence and the precepts of Aelius Donatus) were less frequent on the stage than tragedies and tragicomedies around the start of the 17th century; the comedic element of the early stage was dominated by farce, satirical monologues and by the commedia dell'arte. Jean Rotrou and Pierre Corneille would return to regular comedy shortly before 1630. Corneille's tragedies were strangely un-tragic (his first version of Le Cid was even listed as a tragicomedy), as they had happy endings. In his theoretical works on theater, Corneille redefined both comedy and tragedy around the following suppositions:

- The stage—in both comedy and tragedy—should feature noble characters (this would eliminate many lowbrow characters, typical of farce, from Corneille's comedies). Noble characters should not be depicted as vile (reprehensible actions are generally due to ignoble characters in Corneille's plays).
- Tragedy deals with affairs of state (wars, dynastic marriages); comedy deals with love. For a work to be tragic, it need not have a tragic ending.
- Although Aristotle says that catharsis (purgation of emotion) should be the goal of tragedy, this is only an ideal. In conformity with the moral code of the period, plays should not show evil being rewarded or nobility being degraded.

The history of the public and critical reaction to Corneille's Le Cid may be found in other articles (he was criticized for his use of sources, his violation of good taste, and for other irregularities not conforming to Aristotian or Horacian rules), but its impact was stunning. Cardinal Richelieu asked the newly formed Académie française to investigate and pronounce on the criticism (it was the Academy's first official judgement), and the controversy reveals a growing attempt to control and regulate theater and theatrical forms. This would be the beginning of 17th-century "classicism". Corneille continued to write plays through 1674 (mainly tragedies, but also what he called "heroic comedies"). Many were successful, although the "irregularities" of his theatrical methods were increasingly criticized (notably by François Hédelin, abbé d'Aubignac); the success of Jean Racine from the late 1660s signaled the end of his preeminence.

A select list of dramatists and plays, with indication of genre (dates are often approximate, as date of publication was usually long after the date of first performance), includes:

- Antoine de Montchrestien (c.1575–1621)
  - Sophonisbe, AKA La Cathaginoise, AKA La Liberté (tragedy) 1596
  - La Reine d'Ecosse, AKA L'Ecossaise (tragedy) 1601
  - Aman (tragedy) 1601
  - La Bergerie (pastoral) 1601
  - Hector (tragedy) 1604
- Jean de Schelandre (c.1585–1635)
  - Tyr et Sidon, ou les funestes amours de Belcar et Méliane (1608)
- Alexandre Hardy (1572–c.1632) Hardy reputedly wrote 600 plays; only 34 have survived.
  - Scédase, ou l'hospitalité violée (tragedy) 1624
  - La Force du sang (tragicomedy) 1625 (the plot is taken from a Cervantes short story)
  - Lucrèce, ou l'Adultère puni (tragedy) 1628
- Honorat de Bueil, seigneur de Racan (1589–1670)
  - Les Bergeries (pastoral) 1625
- Théophile de Viau (1590–1626)
  - Les Amours tragiques de Pyrame et Thisbé (tragedy) 1621
- François le Métel de Boisrobert (1592–1662)
  - Didon la chaste ou Les Amours de Hiarbas (tragedy) 1642
- Jean Mairet (1604–1686)
  - La Sylve (pastoral tragicomedy) c.1626
  - La Silvanire, ou La Morte vive (pastoral tragicomedy) 1630
  - Les Galanteries du Duc d'Ossonne Vice-Roi de Naples (comedy) 1632
  - La Sophonisbe (tragedy) 1634
  - La Virginie (tragicomedy) 1636
- Tristan L'Hermite (1601–1655)
  - Mariamne (tragedy) 1636
  - Penthée (tragedy) 1637
  - La Mort de Seneque (tragedy) 1644
  - La Mort de Crispe (tragedy) 1645
  - The Parasite 1653
- Jean Rotrou (1609–1650)
  - La Bague de l'oubli (comedy) 1629
  - La Belle Alphrède (comedy) 1639
  - Laure persécutée (tragicomedy) 1637
  - Le Véritable saint Genest (tragedy) 1645
  - Venceslas (tragicomedy) 1647
  - Cosroès (tragedy) 1648
- Pierre Corneille (1606–1684)
  - Mélite (comedy) 1629
  - Clitandre (tragicomedy, later changed to tragedy) 1631
  - La Veuve (comedy) 1631
  - La Place Royale (comedy) 1633
  - Médée (tragedy) 1635
  - L'Illusion comique (comedy) 1636
  - Le Cid (tragicomedy, later changed to tragedy) 1637
  - Horace (tragedy) 1640
  - Cinna (tragedy) 1640
  - Polyeucte ("Christian" tragedy) c.1641
  - La Mort de Pompée (tragedy) 1642
  - Le Menteur (comedy) 1643
  - Rodogune, princesse des Parthes (tragedy) 1644
  - Héraclius, empereur d'Orient (tragedy) 1647
  - Don Sanche d'Aragon ("heroic" comedy) 1649
  - Nicomède (tragedy) 1650
  - Sertorius (tragedy) 1662
  - Sophonisbe (tragedy) 1663
  - Othon (tragedy) 1664
  - Tite et Bérénice ("heroic" comedy) 1670
  - Suréna, général des Parthes (tragedy) 1674
- Pierre du Ryer (1606–1658)
  - Lucrèce (tragedy) 1636
  - Alcione 1638
  - Scévola (tragedy) 1644
- Jean Desmarets (1595–1676)
  - Les Visionnaires (comedy) 1637
  - Erigone (prose tragedy) 1638
  - Scipion (verse tragedy) 1639
- François Hédelin, abbé d'Aubignac (1604–1676)
  - La Cyminde 1642
  - La Pucelle d'Orléans 1642
  - Zénobie (tragedy) 1647 (written with the intention of affording a model in which the strict rules of the drama were served)
  - Le Martyre de Sainte Catherine (tragedy) 1650
- Paul Scarron (1610–1660)
  - Jodelet 1645
  - Don Japhel d'Arménie 1653
- Isaac de Benserade (c.1613–1691)
  - Cléopâtre (tragedy) 1635

=== Theater under Louis XIV ===
By the 1660s, classicism had imposed itself on French theater. The key theoretical work on theater from this period was François Hedelin, abbé d'Aubignac's Pratique du théâtre (1657), and this work reveals to what degree "French classicism" was willing to modify the rules of classical tragedy to maintain the unities and decorum (d'Aubignac, for example, saw the tragedies of Oedipus and Antigone as unsuitable for the contemporary stage). Although Pierre Corneille continued to produce tragedies until the end of his life, the works of Jean Racine from the late 1660s on totally eclipsed the late plays of the elder dramatist. Racine's tragedies—inspired by Greek myths, Euripides, Sophocles and Seneca—condensed their plot into a tight set of passionate and duty-bound conflicts between a small group of noble characters, concentrating on these characters' double-binds and the geometry of their unfulfilled desires and hatreds. Racine's poetic skill was in the representation of pathos and amorous passion (like Phèdre's love for her stepson); his impact was such that emotional crisis would be the dominant mode of tragedy until the end of the 17th century. Racine's two late plays (Esther and Athalie) opened new doors to Biblical subject matter and the use of theater in the education of young women.

Tragedy during the last two decades of the 17th century and the first years of the 18th century was dominated by productions of classics from Pierre Corneille and Racine, but on the whole the public's enthusiasm for tragedy had greatly diminished; theatrical tragedy paled beside the dark economic and demographic problems at the end of the 17th century, and the "comedy of manners" (see below) had incorporated many of the moral goals of tragedy. Other later-17th century tragedians include Claude Boyer, Michel Le Clerc, Jacques Pradon, Jean Galbert de Campistron, Jean de La Chapelle, Antoine d'Aubigny de la Fosse, l'abbé Charles-Claude Geneste and Prosper Jolyot de Crébillon. At the end of the 17th century (in Crébillon's plays especially), there occasionally appeared a return to the theatricality of the beginning of the century: multiple episodes, extravagant fear and pity, and the representation of gruesome actions on stage.

Early French opera was especially popular with the royal court during this period, and composer Jean-Baptiste Lully was extremely prolific (see the composer's article for more on court ballets and opera in this period). These works carried on in the tradition of tragicomedy (especially the pièces à machines) and court ballet, and also occasionally presented tragic plots (or tragédies en musique). Dramatists working with Lully included Pierre Corneille and Molière but the most important of these librettists was Philippe Quinault, a writer of comedies, tragedies, and tragicomedies.

Comedy in the second half of the 17th century was dominated by Molière. A veteran actor, master of farce, slapstick, the Italian and Spanish theater (see above), and "regular" theater modeled on Plautus and Terence, Molière's output was great and varied. He is credited with giving the French comedy of manners (comédie de mœurs) and the comedy of character (comédie de caractère) their modern form. His hilarious satires of avaricious fathers, précieuses, social parvenues, doctors and pompous literary types were extremely successful, but his comedies on religious hypocrisy (Tartuffe) and libertinage (Dom Juan) brought him criticism from the church; Tartuffe was only performed because of the king's intercession. Many of Molière's comedies (like Tartuffe, Dom Juan and Le Misanthrope) veered between farce and the darkest of dramas, and their endings are far from purely comic. Molière's Les précieuses ridicules was certainly based on an earlier play by Samuel Chappuzeau (best known for his work Le Theatre Francois (1674), which contains the most detailed description of French theatre during this period).

Comedy until the end of the 17th century would continue on the path traced by Molière; the satire of contemporary morals and manners and the "regular" comedy would predominate, and the last great "comedy" of Louis XIV's reign (Alain-René Lesage's Turcaret) is a dark play in which almost no character exhibits redeeming traits.

Below is a select list of French theater after 1659:

- Comedies of Molière (pseudonym of Jean-Baptiste Poquelin) (1622–1673)
  - Les précieuses ridicules 1659
  - L'Ecole des femmes 1662
  - Tartuffe ou L'Imposteur 1664
  - Dom Juan ou Le festin de pierre 1665
  - Le Misanthrope 1666
  - L'Avare 1668
  - Le Bourgeois gentilhomme 1670
  - Les Fourberies de Scapin 1671
  - Les Femmes savantes 1672
  - Le Malade imaginaire 1673
- Thomas Corneille (1625–1709, brother of Pierre Corneille)
  - Timocrate (tragedy) 1659, with the longest run (80 nights) recorded of any play of the 17th century
  - Ariane (tragedy) 1672
  - Circé (tragicomedy) 1675 (cowritten with Donneau de Visé)
  - Psyché (opera) 1678 (in collaboration with Molière and Jean-Baptiste Lully)
  - La Devineresse (comedy) 1679 (cowritten with Donneau de Visé)
  - Bellérophon (opera) 1679
  - Médée (tragedy) 1693
- Philippe Quinault (1635–1688)
  - Alceste (musical tragedy) 1674
  - Proserpine (musical tragedy) 1680
  - Amadis de Gaule (musical tragicomedy) 1684, based on the Renaissance chivalric novel
  - Armide (musical tragicomedy) 1686, based on Tasso's Jerusalem Delivered
- Jean Racine (1639–1699)
  - La Thébaïde (tragedy) 1664
  - Alexandre le Grand (tragedy) 1665
  - Andromaque (tragedy) 1667
  - Les plaideurs (comedy) 1668, Racine's only comedy
  - Brittanicus (tragedy) 1669
  - Bérénice (tragedy) 1670
  - Bajazet (tragedy) 1672
  - Mithridate (tragedy) 1673
  - Iphigénie en Aulide (tragedy) 1674
  - Phèdre (tragedy) 1677
  - Esther (tragedy) 1689
  - Athalie (tragedy) 1691
- Jacques Pradon (1632–1698)
  - Pyrame et Thisbé (tragedy) 1674
  - Tamerlan, ou la mort de Bajazet (tragedy) 1676
  - Phèdre et Hippolyte (tragedy) 1677; this play, released at the same time as Racine's, enjoyed momentary success
- Jean-François Regnard (1655–1709)
  - Le Joueur (comedy) 1696
  - Le Distrait (comedy) 1697
- Jean Galbert de Campistron (1656–1723)
  - Andronic (tragedy) 1685
  - Tiridate (tragedy) 1691
- Florent Carton Dancourt (1661–1725)
  - Le Chevalier à la mode (comedy) 1687
  - Les Bourgeoises à la mode (comedy) 1693
  - Les Bourgeoises de qualité (comedy) 1700
- Alain-René Lesage (1668–1747)
  - Turcaret (comedy) 1708
- Prosper Jolyot de Crébillon (1674–1762)
  - Idomnée (tragedy) 1705
  - Atrée et Thyeste (tragedy) 1707
  - Electre (tragedy) 1709
  - Rhadamiste et Zénobie (tragedy) 1711
  - Xerxes (tragedy) 1714
  - Sémiramis (tragedy) 1717

== Other genres ==
=== Moral and philosophical reflection ===
The 17th century was dominated by a profound moral and religious fervor unleashed by the Counter-Reformation. Of all literary works, devotional books were the century's best sellers. New religious organisations swept the country (see, for example, the work of Saint Vincent de Paul and Saint Francis de Sales). The preacher Louis Bourdaloue (1632–1704) was known for his sermons, and theologian–orator Jacques-Benigne Bossuet (1627–1704) composed a number of celebrated funeral orations. Nevertheless, the 17th century had a number of writers who were considered "libertine"; these authors (like Théophile de Viau (1590–1626) and Charles de Saint-Evremond (1610–1703)), inspired by Epicurus and the publication of Petronius, professed doubts of religious or moral matters during a period of increasingly reactionary religious fervor. René Descartes' (1596–1650) Discours de la méthode (1637) and Méditations marked a complete break with medieval philosophical reflection.

An outgrowth of counter-reformation Catholicism, Jansenism advocated a profound moral and spiritual interrogation of the soul. This movement would attract writers such as Blaise Pascal and Jean Racine, but would eventually come under attack for heresy (they espoused a doctrine bordering on predestination), and their monastery at Port-Royal was suppressed. Blaise Pascal (1623–1662) was a satirist for their cause (in his Lettres provinciales (1656–57)), but his greatest moral and religious work was his unfinished and fragmentary collection of thoughts justifying the Christian religion named Pensées (Thoughts) (the most famous section being his discussion of the "pari" or "wager" on the possible eternity of the soul). Another outgrowth of the religious fervor of the period was Quietism, which taught practitioners a kind of spiritual meditative state.

François de La Rochefoucauld (1613–1680) wrote a collection of prose entitled Maximes (Maxims) in 1665 which analyzed human actions against a deep moral pessimism. Jean de La Bruyère (1645–1696)—inspired by Theophrastus's characters—composed his own collection of Characters (1688), describing contemporary moral types. François de La Mothe-Le-Vayer wrote a number of pedagogical works for the education of the prince. Pierre Bayle's Dictionnaire historique et critique (1695–1697; enlarged 1702), with its multiplicity of marginalia and interpretations, offered a uniquely discursive and multifaceted view of knowledge (distinctly at odds with French classicism); it would be a major inspiration for the Enlightenment and Diderot's Encyclopédie. Important Les Femmes and Grief des Dames and Digression about Montaigne's Essays by Madame Marie de Gournay

=== Mémoires and letters ===
The 17th century is noted for its biographical "mémoires". The first great outpouring of these comes from the participants of the Fronde (like Cardinal de Retz), who used the genre as political justification combined with novelistic adventure. Roger de Rabutin, Comte de Bussy (known as Bussy-Rabutin) is responsible for the scandalous Histoire amoureuse des Gaules, a series of sketches of amorous intrigues by the chief ladies of the court. Paul Pellisson, historian to the king, wrote a Histoire de Louis XIV covering 1660–1670. Gédéon Tallemant des Réaux wrote Les Historiettes, a collection of short biographical sketches of his contemporaries.

Jean-Louis Guez de Balzac's collected letters are credited with executing (in French prose) a reform paralleling Francois de Malherbe's in verse. Madame de Sévigné's (1626–1696) letters are considered an important document of society and literary events under Louis XIV. The most celebrated mémoires of the 17th century, those of Louis de Rouvroy, duc de Saint-Simon (1675–1755), were not published until over a century later. we also remember Ninon de Lenclos's Lettres and the little book La Coquette vengée.
