= 1628 in literature =

This article contains information about the literary events and publications of 1628.

== Events ==
- July 29 (Tuesday) – The King's Men perform Henry VIII at the Globe Theatre, London. George Villiers, 1st Duke of Buckingham is in the audience, but leaves after watching the play's Duke of Buckingham beheaded. The character is based on the historical Edward Stafford, 3rd Duke of Buckingham, who had been executed for treason in 1521. Villiers is assassinated less than a month later.
- Ten-year-old Abraham Cowley produces his Tragicall History of Piramus and Thisbe.
- Construction of St John's College Old Library, Cambridge, is completed after five years.

== New books ==
=== Prose ===
- Robert Arnauld d'Andilly – Stances pour Jésus-Christ
- John Clavell – A Recantation of an Ill Led Life
- Sir John Coke – The First Part of the Institutes of the Lawes of England, or, a Commentary upon Littleton
- Thomas Dekker – Wars, Wars, Wars
- John Earle, Bishop of Salisbury – Microcosmographie
- Nicolas des Escuteaux – Les jaloux desdains de Chrysis
- William Harvey – Exercitatio Anatomica de Motu Cordis et Sanguinis in Animalibus
- Thomas Hobbes – translation of Thucydides' History of the Peloponnesian War
- Samuel Przypkowski – Dissertatio de pace
- Tobias Venner – The baths of Bathe
- George Wither – Britain's Remembrancer

=== Drama ===
- John Ford – The Lover's Melancholy
- Ivan Gundulić – Dubravka
- Thomas May – Julia Agrippina
- James Shirley – The Witty Fair One

=== Poetry ===
- Phineas Fletcher – Britain's Ida (falsely attributed to Edmund Spenser)
- Robert Hayman – Quodlibets (first book of English poetry written in Canada)

== Births ==
- January 12 – Charles Perrault, French fairytale author (died 1703)
- November 28 – John Bunyan, English religious writer (died 1703)
- Unknown date – Abu Salim al-Ayyashi, Moroccan travel writer, poet and scholar (died 1679)

== Deaths ==
- February – Christopher Brooke, English poet, lawyer and politician (date of birth unknown)
- February 5 (burial) – Christopher Middleton, English poet and translator (born c. 1560)
- March 23 – Robert Daborne, English dramatist (born c. 1580)
- October 16 – François de Malherbe, French poet and critic (born 1555)
- Unknown date – Edward Allde, English printer (date of birth unknown)
- Probable year of death – Nicolas des Escuteaux, French novelist (born c. 1570)
