= Antoine de Nervèze =

French writer

Antoine de Nervèze (c. 1570 – after 1622) was a French nobleman and writer of novels, translations, letters and moral works at the end of the 16th and beginning of the 17th centuries.

== Biography ==
He was most likely born in Gascony; he became the secretary of Henri II de Bourbon, prince de Condé (until c.1606), and then passed into the service of king Henry IV of France as "secrétaire de la chambre du roi". Nervèze had close ties to fellow writers Philippe Desportes, Jean Bertaut and Scévole de Saint-Marthe; he was called the king of orators ("le roy des orateurs") by François Maynard and, in a satirical poem, was called (with Nicolas des Escuteaux) the "mignon des dames". Nervèze was one of the most prolific writers of his generation and became for many an arbiter of linguistic style and taste.

Nervèze is representative of a younger generation following on the literary developments of French novelists Nicolas de Montreux and Béroalde de Verville, and he is often associated – along with authors Nicolas des Escuteaux and François du Souhait – with the sentimental novels (or "amours") published during the reign of Henry IV. Nervèze wrote ten novels, of which one is a reworking of a story taken from Ariosto's Orlando furioso and one is a reworking of Tasso's Jerusalem Delivered. Nervèze dedicated his novels to high-ranking members of the nobility around the king: Maximilien de Béthune, duc de Sully; Queen Marie de Médicis; the marquis de Rosny; the vicomte d'Aubeterre.

Nervèze's first novels were published in 1598, but they were most likely written earlier and had perhaps circulated in manuscript form for years. His first "amours" are short works of tragic love that are close to the tragic tales of Italian Matteo Bandello; his later "Léandre" novels show the influence of chivalric adventure novels (like Amadis of Gaul). Most of Nervèze's novels proclaim their veracity and take place in the recent past during the civil wars in France, although the story of Palmelie and Lirisis takes place under François II of France and Charles IX of France, and the story of Lidior occurs around 1600 during the conflict between the Dutch provinces and the Spanish Netherlands. His collected novels were published several times in anthologized form, and the number of editions seems to indicate commercial success.

Along with his novels, Nervèze wrote numerous works of moral philosophy, and his moral and religious philosophy is evident in most of his works, including the novels. His Catholicism is mixed with elements of stoicism and he idealized the chastity and purity of his characters (who frequently seek out retreat in convents to assuage their woes) and his novel Les amours de Polydore et de Virgin[i]e celebrates divine love as a cure for the ravages of earthly love.

In the first decades of the 17th century, Nervèze, Des Escuteaux and their colleagues were seen by their detractors (such as Charles Sorel) as ridiculous purveyors of rhetorical and metaphorical excess, but their works represent an important stage in the development of the novel in France (leading to L'Astrée by Honoré d'Urfé and, later, to Madeleine de Scudéry and Madame de Lafayette), in the development of etiquette and a moralized sense of nobility (the conception of the "honnête homme") and in the evolution of the French language (prefiguring the "Précieuses").

== Works ==
=== Novels ===
- Les chastes et infortunées amours du baron de l'Espine et de Lucrèce de La Prade (1598, 1598, 1610)
- Les amours de Filandre [Philandre] & de Marizee (1598, 1599, 1603)
- Hierusalem assiegee, où est descrite la delivrance de Sophronie & d'Olinde, ensemble les amours d'Hermine & de Tancrede (1599, 1601, 1603) - taken from Torquato Tasso
- Les amours d'Olympe et de Birene (Paris, 1599), (Lyon, 1605) - taken from Ariosto
- Les hasards amoureux de Palmelie et de Lirisis (1600, 1601, 1603)
- Les religieuses amours de Florigene & de Meleagre (Paris, 1600), (Paris, 1602)
- Le triomphe de la constance, où sont descrites les amours de Cloridon & de Melliflore. (1601, 1602, 1605)
- Deux histoires : la première tragique, sur la mort d'une jeune damoyselle exécutée dans la ville de Padoue, la seconde de la délivrance d'un jeune gentilhomme françois, escolier, condamné à la mort, en la ville de Salamanque, en Espagne (1609)
- Les Amours diverses. Divisees en sept histoires (1605, 1606, 1608, 1612, 1615) - anthology of the preceding works
- La victoire de l'amour divin, sous les amours de Polydore et de Virgin[i]e (1608)
- Les advantures guerrieres et amoureuses de Léandre (1608, 1612)
- Suite des advantures guerrieres et amoureuses de Léandre (1609, 1612)
- Les Amours diverses. Divisees en neuf histoires (1609)
- Les avantures de Lidior (1610, 1612)
- Les Amours diverses. Divisees en dix histoires (1611)

=== Other works ===
- Méditations tres devotes en forme de prieres (1599)
- Les Epistres morales du sieur de Nervèze (1598)
- L'academie des modernes poetes françois (1599)
- L'exercice devot de la courtisane repentie (1601)
- La Joie de la France sur la naissance du prince Dauphin (1601)
- Les Larmes et martyre de S. Pierre (Paris, 1601)
- Méditations sur les mysteres de la Sepmaine saincte (1603)
- Le jardin sacré de l'âme solitaire (Paris, 1602)
- Lettre consolatoire envoyee à Mme la duchesse de Mercœur sur le trespas de Mgr le duc de Mercœur (1602)
- Les Essais poétiques (1605)
- Receuil de traictez spirituels (1605) - includes many of the previous works
- Les Poemes spirituels (1606)
- Discours sur le malheur que le Roy et la Royne ont failly en pasant l'eau au pont de Neuilly... (1606)
- Les Estrenes du sieur de Nervèze au Roy (1608)
- Histoire de la vie et trespas de... Charles de Lorraine (1608)
- Lettre consolatoire à Mme la duchesse de Montpensier sur le trespas de Mgr de Montpensier (1608)
- Consolation envoyee à M. de Sainct-Luc, sur la mort de Mme. de Sainct-Luc (1609)
- Receuil de divers cartels (1609)
- Discours consolatoire à la France... sur le trespas de Alphonse Dornano (1610)
- Discours funebre à l'honneur de la memoire de tres clement, invincible et triomphant Henri IIII... (1610)
- Les Oeuvres morales du sieur de Nervèze (1610) - includes much of the preceding
- Le Songe de Lucidor... (1610) - Nervèze deplores the death of Henry IV
- Anniversaire de soupirs et regrets... (Paris, 1611)
- Vie du duc de Mayenne
- Les cinq premiers livres du procès d'amour (1630) - Encyclopedic/Historic poem on love
