= Grand Siècle =

Period of French history, during the 17th century

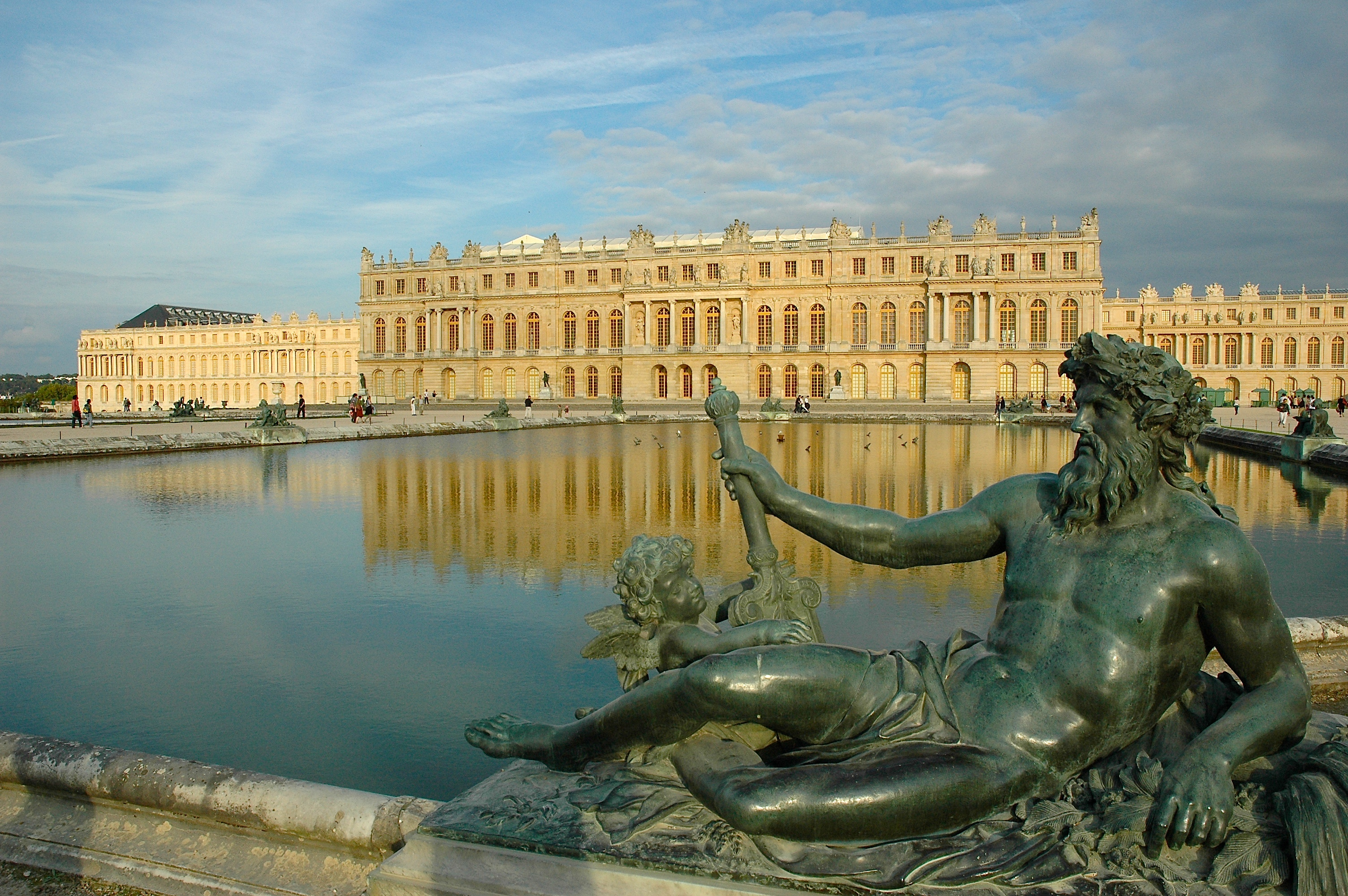
The Palace of Versailles was an expression and concentration of French art and culture, and symbolised the centralization of royal power.

Grand Siècle (French pronunciation: [ɡʁɑ̃ sjɛkl]) or Great Century refers to the period of French history during the 17th century, under the reigns of Louis XIII and Louis XIV.

== Economy, politics and warfare ==
Though primarily associated with Louis XIV's reign, the Grand siècle was notable for the development of art, music and literature already before the Sun King rise to power and historians usually date its beginnings with the start of Henry IV's reign in 1589. The effects of the end of the French Wars of Religion obtained by Henry IV (with the 1598 Edict of Nantes sanctioning religious peace between Catholics and Protestants) and, later, the impact of the Thirty Years' War, which made the Kingdom of France the dominant European power in place of a Spain exhausted by continuous wars were considerable.

This new dominant position, achieved by the middle of the 17th-century, was allowed through the newfound internal peace but also the careful management of the royal household and government by a succession of efficient kings and ministers throughout the century (kings Henry IV, Louis XIII and Louis XIV advised by ministers Sully, Cardinal Richelieu and Cardinal Mazarin). Louis XIV's personal reign, under an absolutist stance from 1661 onwards, definitively quelled the rebellion of the upper aristocracy, thanks to the construction of the Palace of Versailles, where the court was relocated, and created a powerful state apparatus, through the work of effective ministers of state such as Colbert and Louvois who reformed many policies. Hailing from families of secondary nobility and fiercely loyal to the king, they developed trade, manufacturing, the navy and French colonies according to the economic theories of mercantilism.

France's territorial acquisitions during Louis XIV reign.

In the military field, several generals succeeded one another at the head of the royal armies throughout the century, such as the Grand Condé, victorious in the 1643 Battle of Rocroi, which marked the decline of the Spanish tercios and the advent of line infantry, the great strategist Viscount Turenne, renowned for his strategic troop movements and maneuvers (he was Napoleon Bonaparte's most admired general); and, under Louis XIV, the Marshals of Luxembourg, Vendôme, and Villars.

Across the 17th-century, France experienced a military expansion of its borders to the north, east and south with the conquest of Spanish Roussillon, part of Flanders, German-speaking Alsace, and Spanish-held Franche-Comté, at the expense of the Habsburg monarchy. At the beginning of the 18th century, France, which had been surrounded by Habsburg-ruled states since the end of the 16th century, succeeded in placing a member of the Bourbon royal family on the Spanish throne, the Duke of Anjou, a grandson of Louis XIV, who became Philip V of Spain, fulfilling the objective that had governed a good part of its foreign policy during the previous century.

In 1626, Richelieu created the French Royal Navy, which was later reorganized and expanded by Minister Colbert during the reign of Louis XIV, under the leadership of brilliant flagships such as Duquesne and Tourville. In the 17th century, France created its own colonial empire with a vast domain in North America, called New France, stretching from Quebec to Louisiana (named in honor of Louis XIV) via the Mississippi. Several French explorers were the first to venture into the interior of the North American continent, the most famous being René Robert Cavelier de La Salle, who explored the Great Lakes region. But the country's most important holdings for its economy were the various islands in the Caribbean, where sugarcane cultivation was developed through slaves imported from Africa, particularly Saint-Domingue (now Haiti), Guadeloupe, Martinique, and Grenada. To trade with the Orient and India, a French East India Company was created in 1664, under state authority, while France established various trading posts along the coast of India.

== Arts, literature and architecture ==
The period was notable for its development of art, music and literature, along with the construction of the Palace of Versailles, the effects of the French Wars of Religion, and the impacts of the Thirty Years' War, which made France the dominant power in Europe instead of Spain.

Significant figures during the early period of the Grand Siècle, primarily based in Paris include architect François Mansart, painters Nicolas Poussin, Simon Vouet, Georges de La Tour, and Philippe de Champaigne.

In 1661, King Louis XIV ordered the renovation of the Palace of Versailles, which had previously been a hunting lodge and seasonal residence. Until that time, the center of the French government had been in Paris. By moving the court to Versailles, the noble families and aristocrats had to move and reside there if they desired influence over the king. He, in turn, was able to disrupt the older power structures and keep a close eye on any competitors. Aside from the political influence, Versailles was also to become the center of the French arts. Many architects and artists relocated to Versailles or were commissioned by King Louis XIV's court to contribute to the new designs. Notable figures include gardener André Le Nôtre, architects Louis Le Vau and Jules Hardouin-Mansart, painter Charles Le Brun, sculptors Pierre Puget, François Girardon and Antoine Coysevox. Louis XIV's standard of hierarchy extended into the arts, as he would approve a superintendent of a certain field, whose approval was required before an artist, architect or author could produce a given work. This was different from the patronage method of the arts which had long existed in Europe. Some scholars have compared the hierarchy disseminating from the Sun King to the image of the labyrinth of garden paths emanating from the Palace of Versailles. Similarly, the gardens were seen as a sort of theater, in which every nobleman, lady, and even tree and animal played a role in the spectacle directed by the king.

Notable playwrights during the Grand Siècle were Pierre Corneille, Molière and Jean Racine. Like other masters of the arts, playwrights were considered fortunate to have the support of the French court. They had to be cautious not to upset the monarchy and frequently faced negative consequences for upsetting the Church with the content of their plays and ballets.

The use of blackface, known as barbouillage in French theater, was prominent in the seventeenth century. Because of the developing French Caribbean trade in that century, as well as France's history as a colonial empire with holdings in Africa, it was necessary for their cultural perspectives to be reinforced even in entertainment. Although not many average French people could attend court ballets, they were nonetheless influential in policy and political power because of the aristocrats who did. For example, a scholar on the subject cites King Louis XIII's viewing of The Happy Shipwreck, a ballet with blackface, as a potential reason for his legalization of the slave trade in French colonies.

Another popular genre of play involved the intense religious sentiment of France. Numerous plays were written in the early 17th Century about martyrs of the Christian faith, particularly in defense of the Catholic Church which was being questioned across Europe since the 16th Century Protestant Reformation. These plays were written for a broad audience as a Counter-Reformation initiative. Like paintings depicting the sufferings of Christ or the saints, performances were seen as more effective than still images in showing death.

Poetry and literature were also developing during the Grand Siècle. Some important writers during this era are the poets François de Malherbe, Jean de La Fontaine and Nicolas Boileau, and novelists Madame de La Fayette, Charles Perrault, composers Henri Dumont, Jean-Baptiste Lully, Marc-Antoine Charpentier, Michel Richard Delalande, André Campra, Henri Desmarest, Marin Marais and François Couperin. Romance novels, or roman de chevalerie were a reignited genre during the Grand Siècle, having been popular during the Medieval era. They were commonly associated with female authors and especially correlated with female readers. When absolutism prevented accurate historical writing, authors often chose to write short stories, or nouvelles loosely based on history. Other authors, such as Bernard Le Bovier de Fontenelle published works of imagined dialogue between Ancient and Modern philosophers, as in his series Nouveaux Dialogues des Morts (1683).

France developed its own genre of opera during its Grand Siècle, notably through the work of Jean-Baptiste Lully and the Sun King’s preference for continual music at Versailles.

Philosophy also flourished during the Grand Siècle. Important philosophers were René Descartes, Blaise Pascal, Antoine Arnauld, Nicolas Malebranche, Pierre Gassendi, La Rochefoucauld, La Bruyere, and Pierre Bayle.

== See also ==
- 17th-century French literature
- 17th-century French art
- French Academy of Sciences
