= The Witty Fair One =

Play by James Shirley

The Witty Fair One is a Caroline era stage play, an early comedy by James Shirley. Critics have cited the play as indicative of the evolution of English comic drama from the humors comedy of Ben Jonson to the Restoration comedy of Wycherley and Congreve, and the comedy of manners that followed.

== Date, performance, publication ==
The play was licensed for performance by Sir Henry Herbert, the Master of the Revels, on 3 October 1628. It was acted by Queen Henrietta's Men at the Cockpit Theatre, as were most of Shirley's plays in this era. It was first published in quarto in 1633, printed by Bernard Alsop and Thomas Fawcet for the bookseller William Cooke. The play was revived during the Restoration era, in 1666, shortly after the poet's death.

== Synopsis ==
The play's heroine, Violetta, is determined to avoid an arranged marriage with the suitor of her father's choice, Sir Nicholas Treedle, and marry her beloved, Aimwell, instead. But to do so she must outwit her father's watchful servant, Brains. After a complex back-and-forth of misdirected and intercepted letters, Violetta manages to communicate with Aimwell through her maidservant Sensible, to prepare a plan of action. Through Sir Nicholas, she gains her father's permission to go shopping — with Brains as her escort. She has deluded Sir Nicholas's vain Tutor into thinking that she will elope with him; but when the Tutor attempts to abscond with her, he receives a beating from Brains. As this happens, however, Sensible takes Violetta's place in disguise. The Tutor brings officers to arrest Brains for assault, and seizes the disguised Sensible — only to be intercepted in turn by Sir Nicholas and his servants, who carry off Sensible under the same mistaken impression that she is Violetta. Meanwhile, Violetta and Aimwell have married. Learning that he has actually married Sensible, Sir Nicholas decides to make the best of the matter (which seems a better bargain for him than for Sensible).

In the subplot, Violetta's cousin Penelope is in love with Fowler, even though she knows him to be a libertine who will use her and abandon her if he can. Penelope schemes to lead him to the altar instead. She manipulates Fowler into attending his own false funeral, where he hears his sordid life recounted; and he imagines how it would be if the funeral were real. Penelope confronts him, as a man "dead" to his nobler nature; as she seems about to renounce him, Fowler repents and promises to reform if she will accept him as her husband.

== Critical response ==
The Witty Fair One has been praised as "a model of its type, for its novel and inventive plotting...seldom has the principle of climax and surprise been so cleverly employed as in this comedy." The identity of the "witty fair one," however, has been disputed; while the title has been assumed to apply to Violetta, the heroine of the main plot, a case has also been made for the "ingenious maiden" Penelope, the heroine of the subplot. (Some English Renaissance plays derive their titles from comic subplot characters; Blurt Master Constable and Grim the Collier of Croydon are two examples.)

Within the context of the Shakespeare authorship debate the subplot (Act V) of The Witty Fair One has been interpreted as a disclosure of the true Shakespeare's (Marlowe's) destiny: William Shakspere (Stratford) and James Shirley
