= Jean Donneau de Visé =

Jean Donneau de Visé (1638 – 8 July 1710) was a French journalist, royal historian ("historiographe du roi"), playwright and publicist. He was founder of the literary, arts and society gazette "le Mercure galant" (founded in 1672) and was associated with the "Moderns" in the "Quarrel of the Ancients and the Moderns".

== Life ==
Donneau de Visé was born in Paris. He was among the detractors of Molière during the quarrel over Molière's play "The School for Wives" (1662, "l’École des femmes"), accusing the author of obscenity and moral licentiousness. But Donneau de Visé eventually became reconciled with the comic playwright and contributed his own plays to Molière's acting troop, starting with la Mère coquette (1665) and (after Molière's death) several "machine" plays ("pièces à machines", i.e. plays with elaborate special scenic effects) written in collaboration with Thomas Corneille -- Circé (1675) and la Devineresse (1679) -- which were very successful in their runs at the Hôtel Guénégaud.

Donneau de Visé wrote a collection of short novelas: Nouvelles galantes et comiques (1669).

In 1672, Donneau de Visé founded the "Mercure galant", a gazette on the arts, theater and literature, which also included galant songs and society news and gossip. Although frequently denigrated by authors of the period (such as Jean de La Bruyère), the periodical eventually became a financial success, and brought (along with his plays and his work as royal historian) Donneau de Visé comfortable revenues.

At his death in 1710, Donneau de Visé's "Mercure galant" had become the uncontested arbiter of literary taste and the paper of record for news about the court and court society for subscribers in the provinces.

== Work ==
In 1664, Donneau de Visé produced a heterogenous literary compilation under the title Les Diversités gallantes (English:Various Galantries). It was published by Claude Barbin, initially consisting of:

- A preface dedicated to Louis Joseph, Duke of Guise, who had just inherited his title, and a dialogue discussing his qualities, 16 pages in length.
- The novella L'apothicaire de qualité, nouvellee galante et veritable (English: The Noble Apothecary, A Gallant and True Story), 45 pages in length.
- A letter critique of the recent theatrical output of Molière, 15 pages in length.
- A comic novella set at a Parisian inn, 52 pages in length.
- The seven-scene, one-act theatrical play La Vengéance des Marquis (English: The Marquis' Revenge), 40 pages in length.

The work proved popular and was reprinted twice in 1664. The 1665 edition added to the work two previously published novellas: L'Avanture d'hostellerie, ou les Deux rivales (English:Adventure at the Inn, or The Two Rivals) and Le Mariage de Belfegore, nouvelle facétieuse (English: The marriage of Belphegor, a Mischievous Novella). The work continued to receive new editions to the 1670s, both in France and abroad.

Allison Stedman summarizes the plot of The Noble Apothecary, which focuses on noble protagonists Timante (male) and Araminte (female). Timante regularly visits the residence of his friend Araminte, and a servant escorts him to her bedroom. There the two discuss various topics, with Araminte lounging in bed and the visitor seated nearby. The presence of servants and other visitors ensures that they are never alone. One day, Timante enters to find the house seemingly deserted but still heads towards Araminte's bedroom. He finds Araminte kneeling on the bed, with her behind uncovered. She is waiting for someone to administer an enema, and the syringe has already been prepared. Timante impulsively takes on the role of an apothecary and delivers the treatment. Then he slips away unseen.

Araminte and her staff cannot explain who entered the bedroom. Rumors of a ghost apothecary soon circulate in Paris. When the identity of the ghost is discovered, Araminte is humiliated and bans Timante from entry into her house. In a series of epistles, Timante tries to convince her to reconsider. He rationally argues that his treatment of her was an act of gallantry (chivalry), assisting her in her hour of need. With Cartesian-like arguments, Timante wins her over and proceeds to marry her. The society around them is puzzled by a properly-delivered enema as grounds for marriage.

Stedman finds the circumstances surrounding this work to be indicative of the publishing trends of the 17th-century. Novelistic works of various lengths and genres were typically published as part of books comprising works of more than one genre, including ghost stories, fairy tales, allegories, poetry, etc. Virtually any type of work could end up published together with a novel. But these novels and novellas are rarely studied in the context in which they originally appeared, and they are often overlooked altogether. What she terms "hybrid literary production" chronologically follows the lengthy, action-oriented novels of the previous era. And they both precede and differ from the new dominant literary form of the reign of Louis XIV: the short, psychologically-realistic novellas epitomized by La Princesse de Clèves (1678).

== Sources ==
- Schuwey, Christophe (2020), Un entrepreneur des lettres au XVII^{e} siècle: Jean Donneau de Visé, de Molière au "Mercure galant", Classiques Garnier, ISBN 978-2406095705
- Stedman, Allison (2012), Rococo Fiction in France, 1600-1715: Seditious Frivolity, Rowman & Littlefield, ISBN 978-1611484366
