= Roland Le Vayer de Boutigny =

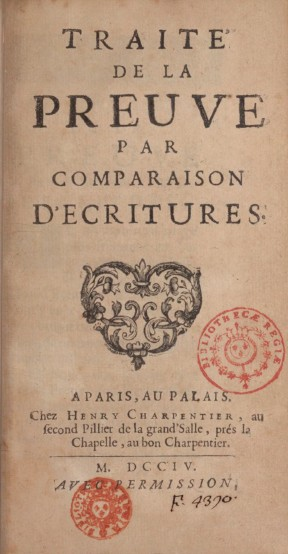
Cover page of Traité de la preuve par comparaison d'écritures by Roland Le Vayer de Boutigny (Paris : 1704). (Paris BNF).

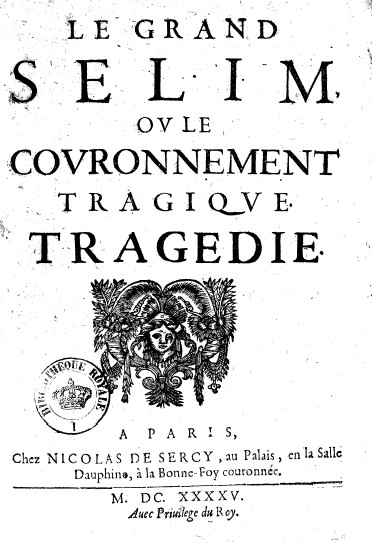
Cover page of Le Grand Selim, ou le couronnement tragique. (Paris, 1645), in-4°. (Paris BNF).

Roland Le Vayer, sieur de Boutigny (Le Mans, November 1627 – Soissons, 5 December 1685) was a French lawyer and writer at the end of the 17th century.

== Biography ==
He was a lawyer by the Parlement of Paris from 1645, then a master of requests from 1671. Between 1682 and 1685, he was "intendant de la généralité de Soissons". He published a treatise on the forensic examination of the Scriptures, as well as several theatre plays.

== Works of law ==
- Traité de la preuve par comparaison d'écritures. S.l.n.d., 4°, 50 p. (Paris BNF : F-21443).
- Traité de la preuve par comparaison d'écritures. Paris : 1666, 2°, 54 p. (Paris BNF : F-1981).
- Traité de la preuve par comparaison d'écritures. Paris : H. Charpentier, 1704. 12°, 152 p. (Paris BNF).
- A copy of this treatise appeared in the collection Taupier (No. 147); this is probably the one now in Chicago NL : Wing MS ZW 39 .501
- Extraict du traitté fait par M. Le Vayer sur la preuve par comparaison d'écritures, dans l'affaire de Maillard, où il est prouvé... que le rapport des experts ne peut faire la moindre preuve en matière criminelle... S. l. n. d. 4°, 3 p. (Paris BNF).
- Réflexion sur l'édit touchant la réforme des monastères. S. l. : 1667. 12°. (Paris BNF).
- De l'autorité du Roy, touchant l'age nécessaire à la profession solennelle des religieux. Paris : Jacques Cottin, 1669. Digitized on Gallica.
- Observations sur un manuscrit intitulé : « Traité du péculat ». S. l. n. d. 4°, 122 p. Paris BNF : F-14283.
- Traité de la peine du péculat, selon les loix et usages de France. S. l. n. d. 4°, 78 p. Digitized on Gallica.
- Dissertations sur l'autorité légitime des rois, en matière de regale. Par M.L.V.M.D.R. Cologne : Pierre Marteau, M.DC.LXXXII. 12°, [12]-333 p.

== Dramatic and literary works ==
- Le Grand Selim, ou le couronnement tragique, tragédie. Paris : Nicolas de Sercy, 1645. in-4°, 111 p. digitized on Gallica.
- Bérénice. Paris : Toussaint Quinet, 1648-1641. 4 vol. 8°.
- Mitridate. Paris : Toussaint Quinet, 1648-1651. 3 vol. 8°.
- Tarsis et Zélie. Paris : Thomas Jolly ou Guillaume de Luyne, 1665-1666. 4 vol. 8°, available on Gallica.

== Bibliography ==
- Émile-Louis Chambois. Testament de R.-R. Le Vayer de Boutigny. In Bulletin de la Société d'agriculture, sciences et arts de la Sarthe 39 (1903-1904) (p. 168-171).
- Henry C. Lancaster. A history of French dramatic literature in the seventeenth century. Baltimore : Johns Hopkins Press; Paris : Les Presses universitaires, 1929-1942. 9 vol. 8°. (see vol. II (p. 621-622).

== See also ==
- 17th-century French literature
- data.bnf : Roland Le Vayer de Boutigny (1627-1685)
