= Jean Galbert de Campistron =

French dramatist (1656–1723)

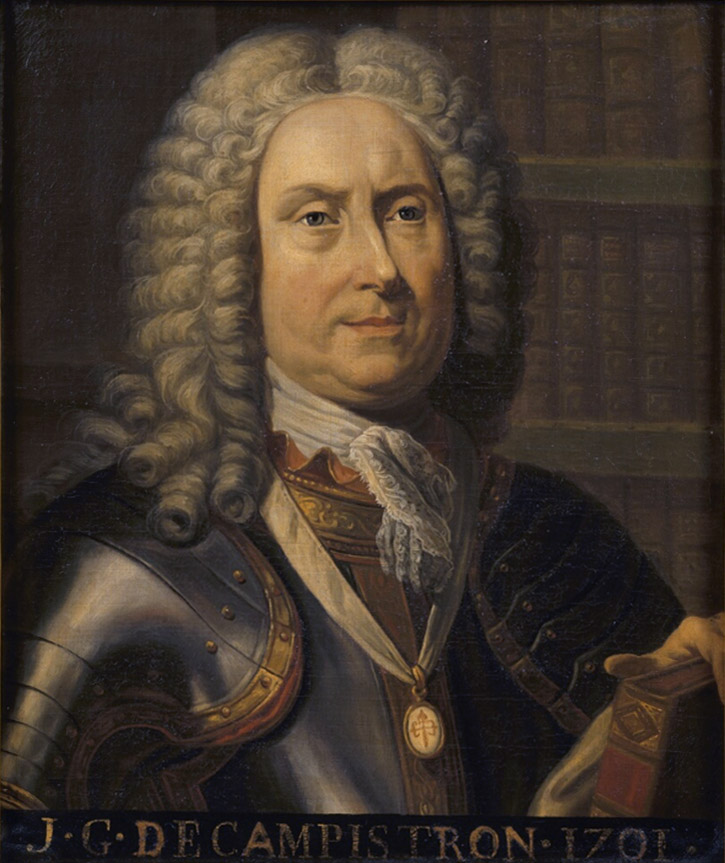
- Born: 3 August 1656; Toulouse, Languedoc
- Died: 11 May 1723 (aged 66); Toulouse
- Occupations: Writer, playwright, librettist
- Writing career
- Language: French
- Period: 17th-century French literature
- Notable awards: Académie française (1701-1723)

Jean Galbert de Campistron (3 August 1656 – 11 May 1723) was a French dramatist.

== Biography ==
Campistron was born in Toulouse, France to a noble family. At the age of seventeen he was wounded in a duel and sent to Paris. Here he became an ardent disciple of Racine.

He secured the patronage of the influential duchesse de Bouillon by dedicating Arminius to her, and in 1685 he scored his first success with Andronic, which disguised under other names the tragic story of Don Carlos and Elizabeth of France. The piece made a great sensation, but Campistron's treatment is weak, and he failed to avail himself of the possibilities inherent in his subject.

Racine was asked by Louis Joseph, duc de Vendôme, to write the libretto of an opera to be performed at a fête given in honor of the Dauphin. He handed on the commission to Campistron, who produced Acis et Galatée for Lully's music. Campistron had another success in Tiridate (1691), in which he treated, again under changed names, the biblical story of Amnon's passion for his sister Tamar.

He wrote many other tragedies and two comedies, one of which, Le Jaloux Désabusé, has been considered by some judges to be his best work.

In 1686 he had been made intendant to the duc de Vendôme and followed him to Italy and Spain, accompanying him on all his campaigns.

== Works ==
Acis et Galatée (1686).

- Virginie, tragedy (Comédie-Française, 12 February 1683)
- Arminius, tragedy (Comédie-Française, 19 February 1684)
- Alcibiade, tragedy (Comédie-Française, 28 December 1685)
- Andronic, tragedy (Comédie-Française, 8 February 1685). The play renders the legend of Carlos, Prince of Asturias under different names, transferring the action to the Byzantine empire in the 14th century in the court of John V Palaiologos.
- Acis et Galatée, opéra-ballet, music by Lully (Château d'Anet, 6 September 1686; Académie royale de musique, 17 September). Pastorale héroïque en musique, représentée pour la première fois au château d'Anet devant Mgr le Dauphin par l'Académie royale de musique.
- Phraate, tragedy (Comédie-Française, 26 December 1686).
- Phocion, tragedy (Comédie-Française, 16 December 1688).
- L'Amante amant, comédie (Comédie-Française, 2 August 1684).
- Achille et Polixène, tragedy with music (Académie royale de musique, 7 November 1687).
- Adrien, tragedy chrétienne tirée de l'Histoire de l'Église (Comédie-Française, 11 January 1690).
- Tiridate, tragedy, (Comédie-Française, 12 February 1691)
- Aétius, tragedy (Comédie-Française, 28 January 1693).
- Alcide, tragedy with music (music by Marin Marais) (Académie royale de musique, 31 March 1693). Alcide fait, par deux fois, l’objet d’une reprise : sous le titre La Mort d'Hercule (1705), puis sous le titre La Mort d'Alcide (1716).
- Le Jaloux désabusé, comedy (Comédie-Française, 13 December 1709).

== Honours ==
Many honours were conferred on him. The king of Spain bestowed on him the order of St James of the Sword; the duke of Mantua made him marquis of Penango in Montferrat; and in 1701 he was received into the Academy. After thirty years of service with Vendôme he retired to his native place, where he died on 11 May 1723.
