= François du Souhait =

French writer

François du Souhait (between 1570 and 1580 – 1617 in Nancy) was a French language author (translator, novelist, poet, satirist, moral philosopher) of the late 16th and early 17th century from the Duchy of Lorraine (at the time, a sovereign court with ties to France).

== Life ==
François du Souhait was born to a noble family in the Champagne region. He became "secrétaire ordinaire" to Charles III, Duke of Lorraine (between 1600 et 1605), and later Henry II, Duke of Lorraine (from 1608), and several of his works are dedicated to high-ranking members of the Lorraine court, including Princess Catherine of Lorraine and the brothers François de Bassompierre and Je(h)an de Bassompierre. Du Souhait lived for many years in France, but he was apparently banished in 1614 for having contributed to a scabrous satirical poetry collection. One biographer (Jean Serroy) believes that while in France Du Souhait frequented the literary circle around Marguerite de Valois (through the intervention of his friend, fellow author Jacques Corbin).

== Writings ==
Du Souhait was the author of seven novels, a collection of short stories (for which he is today most well-known), a collection of poems, a pastoral, a tragedy in 5 acts, a translation of the Iliad, and several works of moral and didactic philosophy. Of his seven novels, only his first two seem to have had a certain commercial success (four editions each, both in Paris and Lyon). As a novelist, Du Souhait's early works participated in the same tradition of the "sentimental novel" as authors Antoine de Nervèze and Nicolas des Escuteaux, although Du Souhait differs from these authors both in his content (he paints a far less idealized portrait of love and includes occasional satirical/realistic elements) and in his sometimes awkward style (especially in his "tit-for-tat" gallant dialogues). Like these other authors, in his later works Du Souhait moved away from the sentimental toward the longer adventurous novel with pastoral elements. Du Souhait's ear for oral discourse and his satirical side are most apparent in his short story collection Histoires comiques ou entretiens facetieux (Paris, 1612). Du Souhait also contributed laudatory poems to the prefatory material of works by Timothée de Chillac and Pierre de Deimier.

Du Souhait's seven novels are:

- Les amours de Poliphile et de Mellonimphe (Lyon, 1599), (Paris, 1600), (Lyon, 1605), (Lyon, 1610)
- Les amours de Palemon, suitte de Poliphile (Lyon, 1599), (Paris, 1600), (Lyon, 1602), (Lyon, 1605)
- Les amours de Glorian et d'Ismene (Paris, 1600)
- Les Proprietez d'amour et les propretez des amans, contenant une histoire des amours de Filine et de Polymante (Paris, 1601)
- Les Chastes Destinees de Cloris ou le Roman des histoires de ce temps (Paris, 1609)
- Le Romant d’Anacrine, où sont representes plusieurs Combats, Histoires veritables & Amoureuses (Paris, 1613)
- Le Romant de Gloriande, ou suitte du roman d’Anacrine, où sont continuees les Histoires du premier volume: Avec plusieurs autres nouvelles et force belles avantures (Paris, 1613), (Paris, 1630).

== See also ==
- French literature of the 17th century
