= Honnête homme =

The honnête homme (French: [ɔnɛt ɔm]; literally "honest man") was a moral ideal of seventeenth-century Europe. Widespread in the contemporary literature, the term denotes a man possessing broad general knowledge, the social qualities suited to making him agreeable at court (courtesy and humility), and moral virtues (moderation and mastery of his emotions). A man of the court and a man of the world, he was expected to show himself humble, courteous and cultivated, but also capable of adapting to those around him.

The ideal is heir to the Greek ideal of the kalos kagathos as portrayed by Xenophon in the figure of Ischomachus, but also to the reflections of medieval theologians on honestas ("moral beauty") and the "honest cleric" (clericus honestus).

== History ==
The honnête homme as an ideal human emerged in the seventeenth century from the pens of the moralists and writers of the period. It reflects the emergence and growing self-assertion of the bourgeoisie within the society of that century, in the face of a nobility that occupied the whole space of social consciousness. At the same time, the appearance of the figure of the honnête homme brings out the ambiguity of his social position. Until then, the ascendancy of the nobility had made the courtier the human ideal. With the honnête homme, by contrast, worldly politeness became a moral obligation.

=== Origins ===
Nicolas Faret wrote the first treatise in French on the subject, L'Honnête Homme (1630), drawing heavily on Baldassare Castiglione's The Book of the Courtier (1528).

=== Legacy ===
This human ideal endured until the middle of the twentieth century and was not confined to France: the concept of the cultivated, reasonable and universally curious gentleman appeared in London in the years following the Glorious Revolution, but tended to fade towards the end of the Victorian era.

In 1947 the French historian Philippe Ariès could still write that "the honnête homme represents not a professional intellectual, but a curious, cultivated mind of sure taste".

== Medieval antecedents ==
The modern origin of the use of honnête homme to characterize a person has been questioned by medieval historians. According to the medievalist Pascal Vuillemin, the norms the honnête homme embodied were largely defined and codified between the sixth and the fifteenth centuries, and the figure itself can be described as the secular avatar of the medieval "honest cleric" (clericus honestus).

=== From honestum to honestas ===
The Latin term honestas spread at the end of the Roman Republic, alongside the older honestum, an adjective used as a noun (substantive). Where honestum designated an abstract philosophical concept of moral good, honestas (first attested in the Rhetorica ad Herennium and in Cicero's De Inventione) referred to its human form: a "moral beauty" demonstrated in practice. Classical authors, however, never fixed the norms that would define such a practice; Roman moral standards varied by social condition, sex and ethnicity, and honestas remained essentially theoretical. The early Church Fathers referred to the notion only incidentally, seeking to accommodate its Stoic heritage cautiously to Christian teaching.

=== Christian definition ===
From the end of the fourth century, linking honestas to particular human traits gained acceptance. Ambrose of Milan in his De officiis ministrorum (380s) reworked Cicero's De Officiis in a Christian key, while Augustine gave honestas its first exclusively Christian definition: since God is the only honestum that deserves to be pursued as an end, honestas is the quality of the man wholly oriented toward that end, based on four virtues (prudence, fortitude, temperance and justice) which Augustine, ordered with justice being the highest (thus breaking with the Stoics). The practical aspect (missing an Augustine's treatment) was supplied by Martin of Braga's Formula vitae honestae (before 579), addressed to the Suevic king Miro. Martin had listed a set of concrete prescriptions for "honest life" (moderation in food and drink, measured speech and laughter, general modesty, cleanliness) that were attainable by laymen. This treatise (earlier attributed to Seneca) became one of the earliest medieval mirrors of princes and influenced the genre from Smaragdus of Saint-Mihiel to Vincent of Beauvais. In the twelfth century, the Moralium dogma philosophorum attributed to William of Conches synthesised the accumulated tradition to great success, and in Alan of Lille's Anticlaudianus (c. 1180) it is Honestas who instructs the perfect homo novus, the "new man" created by Nature.

=== The honest cleric ===
The term Honestash entered canon law in 1191–1192, as Bernard of Pavia compiled the Pope's decretals on clerical life into a new compendium, De vita et honestate clericorum; included into the Decretals of Gregory IX and later collections. The honestas thus became an eforceable norm, rather than an object of scholastic discussions. Decretalists and scholastic theologians (Thomas Aquinas, Hostiensis) distinguished an honestas interior, resting on the four virtues, from an honestas exterior manifested in dress (honestas in habitu), bodily discipline (in gestu) and social conduct (in conversatione). Church statutes and treatises (including the Speculum disciplinae by Bonaventure) regulated these registers in minute detail: the form of the tonsure, black as the only "honest" colour of dress, prohibitions on laughing with open teeth or crossing one's legs. In the formula of the decretalist Johannes Andreae, the cleric's honestas was to be visible "from the crown of the head to the soles of the feet".

=== Diffusion to the laity ===
Conceived as a living example for the whole of Christian society, the clerical model spread outward from thirteenth-century Italy. The judge Albertano of Brescia declared honestas to be a part of civic concord (societal consensus). Bono Giamboni is credited with the first Italian translation of the Formula; manuals for podestàs presented it as a crucial quality of the magistrate. Brunetto Latini devoted a chapter of Book of Treasures to "Honesté", thus confirming the change of an ecclesiastical norm into a lay one. Its outward forms were secularised as eloquence along with urbanity and civility, diffused by books of manners for children (the English Babees Book, the French Les Contenances de la table) that fed Erasmus's On Civility in Children (1530). Giovanni Pontano's De sermone (1501) and Baldassare Castiglione's The Book of the Courtier (1528) adapted the notion for the court, with Castiglione's sprezzatura amounting to the full internalisation of rules that had shaped the medieval cleric; when Faret perfected the portrait of the honnête homme in 1630, its first quality was precisely this assimilation, achieved "without art and without any constraint".

== Definition ==
The honnête homme is a being of contrasts and equilibrium. He embodies a tension arising from the search for balance between body and soul, between the demands of life and those of thought, between the virtues of antiquity and Christian virtues. He must shun excess, even in what is good. In a word, he is an ideal of moderation and balance in the use of all the faculties.

The honnête homme possesses what would today be called "general knowledge". He is capable of conversing on a great number of subjects. He thus stands opposed to the specialist. This (generalist) ideal of education aimed less at developing any particular type of knowledge than at cultivating "good taste". This conception of the honnête homme, which expresses a search for balance rather than an accumulation of knowledge, recalls Montaigne's principle that it is better to have "a well-made head than a well-filled one".

Through a judicious blend of general knowledge with good taste and polished manners, the aim was for man to realise fully the ancient definition of him as a "rational animal". In Nicolas Boileau's formula, he had to "know both how to converse and how to live" (savoir et converser et vivre).

== In literature ==
The concept of the honnête homme also appears in the works of seventeenth-century authors, notably Madeleine de Scudéry and Molière. It is prominently represented in Tartuffe in the character of Cléante, and likewise in Elmire, his female counterpart. Molière also condemned excess among the précieuses, calling them "dragons of virtue" (dragons de vertu in L'École des femmes, Act IV, Scene 8). In La Bruyère's Les Caractères, the characters Acis, Arrias and Périandre are depicted as opposites of the honnête homme: Acis (Book V, remark 7) is a fine talker who uses excessively elaborate and cryptic language to conceal his lack of wit; Arrias (Book V, remark 9) is a courtier who parades pseudo-knowledge — pedantic yet without learning, and prepared to lie in order to claim it; and Périandre (Book VI, remark 21) is a man who passes himself off as a noble although he holds no title of nobility, and who keeps company with self-interested people. Les Caractères defends the ideal of the honnête homme by showing that it serves to correct the failings of the society painted in its remarks.

== Criticism of the ideal ==
René Descartes took up the ideal of the honnête homme in a critical spirit. Hostile to erudition, he asserted:

It is no more the duty of an honnête homme to know Greek or Latin than to know Swiss German or Low Breton, nor the history of the Holy Roman Empire any more than that of the smallest state in Europe; and I think he should simply devote his leisure to good and useful things, and fill his memory only with the most necessary ones.

Jean-Jacques Rousseau offered a much harsher critique of the ideal of the honnête homme. In the preface to his Narcisse, he claimed to denounce the fact that "one must necessarily renounce virtue to become an honnête homme". As Jacques Roger remarks in his preface to Rousseau's two prize-winning discourses, virtue has only one meaning: "the complete devotion of man to his fellows, of the citizen to his fatherland". Thus, continuing his critique of politeness — which socially condemns one to appear other than one is, and not to see others as they are — Rousseau criticised the honnête homme, who in his view, by attaching too much importance to politeness, gives a carnivalesque dimension to human exchanges.

== See also ==
- Classicism
- Gentleman
- Humanism

== Sources ==
- Ariès, Philippe (11 January 1947). "L'histoire pour grand public". Notre Temps (in French). p. 2.
- Demimuid, M. "Le traité de l'éducation des filles" [The Treatise on the Education of Girls]. Revue du monde catholique (in French): 177–185.
- Descartes, René (1826). Cousin, Victor (ed.). Recherche de la vérité par les lumières naturelles (in French). In Œuvres de Descartes. Paris. pp. 334–376 – via Wikisource.
- Domenach, Jean-Marie (1989). Ce qu'il faut enseigner : pour un nouvel enseignement général dans le secondaire [What must be taught: in support of a new general secondary education] (in French). Paris: Seuil.
- Groulx, Lionel (1945). "L'originalité de notre histoire". Centenaire de l'Histoire du Canada de François-Xavier Garneau (in French). Montreal: Société historique de Montréal.
- Guenancia, Pierre (28 February 2023). "Descartes un honnête homme désuet". Avec Philosophie, France Culture (in French).
- Hazard, Paul (1968) [1935]. La crise de la conscience européenne 1680–1715 (in French). Paris: Fayard.
- Marmier, Jean. "Honnête homme". Encyclopædia Universalis (in French).
- Viau, Pierre (1968). "La fin de l'humanisme classique". Options humanistes (in French). Paris: Les Éditions ouvrières.
- Vuillemin, Pascal (2016). "Modernité du Moyen Âge ou Moyen Âge de la Modernité ? Généalogie médiévale de « l'Honnête Homme »". In Nijenhuis-Bescher, Andreas; Pépy, Émilie-Anne; Champeley, Jean-Yves (eds.). L'Honnête homme, l'or blanc et le Duc d'Albe. Mélanges offerts à Alain Becchia. Sociétés, Religions, Politiques (in French). Vol. 33. Chambéry: Université Savoie Mont Blanc, Laboratoire LLSETI. pp. 277–322. ISBN 978-2-919732-56-2.
