= François le Métel de Boisrobert =

French poet and playwright (1592-1662)

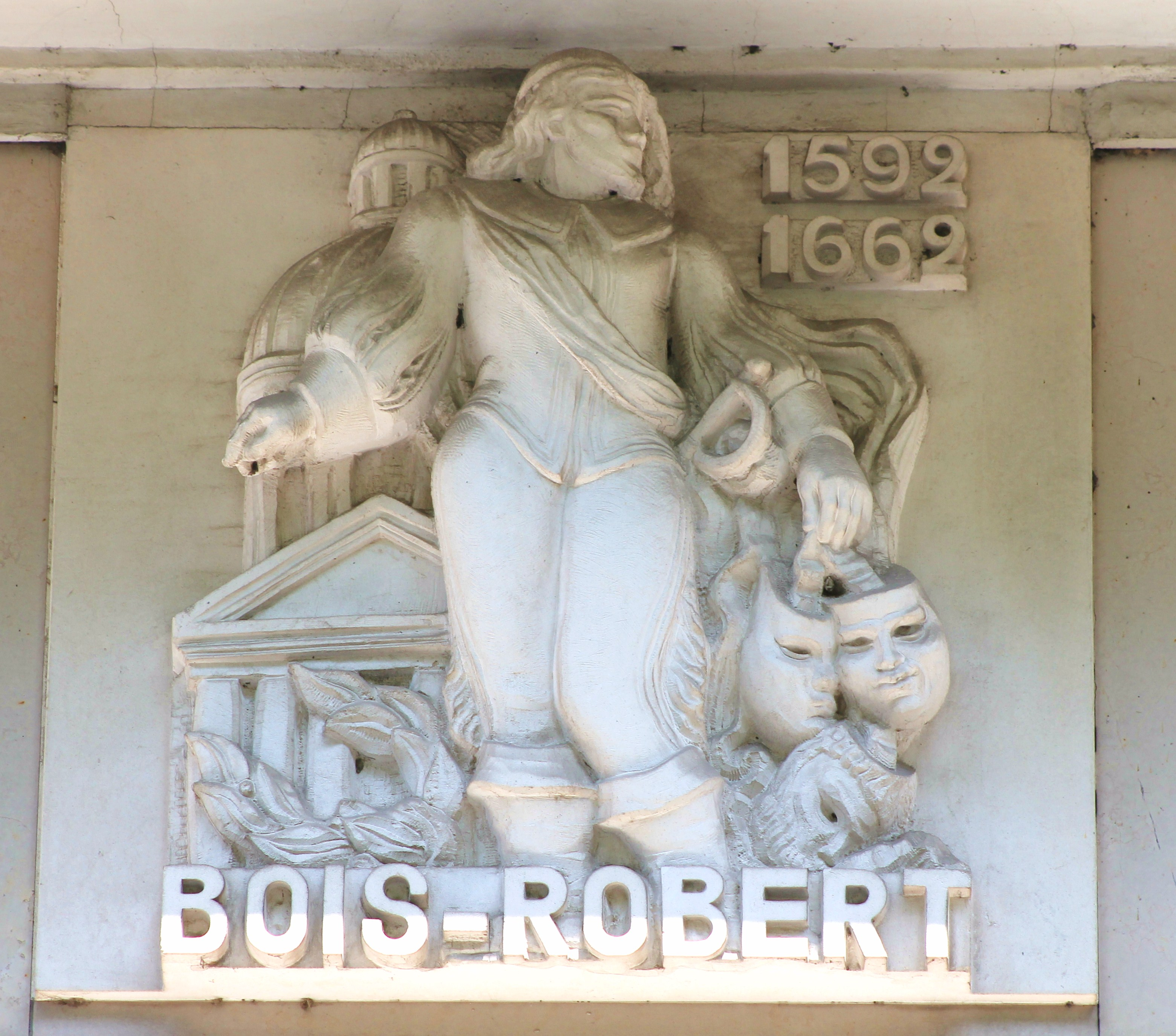
- Born: 1 August 1592; Caen
- Died: 30 March 1662 (aged 69); Paris
- Occupations: Writer, poet, playwright and abbot
- Writing career
- Language: French
- Period: 17th-century French literature
- Notable awards: Académie française (1634-1662)

François le Métel de Boisrobert (1 August 1592 – 30 March 1662) was a French poet, playwright, and courtier.

== Life ==
He was born in Caen. He trained as a lawyer, later practising for a time in Rouen. He traveled to Paris in 1622 and established employment at court, for he had a share in the ballet of the Bacchanales performed at the Louvre in February. In 1630 visited Rome, where he won the favour of Pope Urban VIII and was made a canon of Rouen.

He was introduced to Cardinal Richelieu in 1623, and became one of five poets to inspire Richelieu's works. It was Boisrobert who suggested to Richelieu the plan of the Académie française, and he was one of its earliest and most active members. These efforts resulted in him becoming quite wealthy. After the death of Richelieu, he became affiliated with Mazarin, whom he served faithfully throughout the Fronde. In his later years, he dedicated much of his time to his duties as a priest.

He wrote a number of comedies and contributed to numerous others, including La Belle Plaideuse and Molière's The Miser. Contes, published under the name of his brother D'Ouville, is also often largely attributed to him.

== Works ==
- Pyrandre et Lisimène ou l'Heureuse tromperie (1633)
- Les Rivaux amis (1639)
- Les Deux Alcandres (1640)
- La Belle Palène (1642)
- Le Couronnement de Darie (1642)
- La Vraie Didon ou Didon la chaste (1643)
- La Jalouse d'elle-même (1650)
- Les Trois Orontes (1652)
- L'hiver de Paris
- La Folle gageure ou les divertissements de la comtesse de Pembroc (1653) (from Lope de Vega
- Cassandre, comtesse de Barcelone (performed for the first time at the Hôtel de Bourgogne on 31 October 1653)
- L'Inconnue (1655)
- L'Amant ridicule (1655)
- Les Généreux ennemis (1655)
- La Belle plaideuse (1655)
- La Belle invisible ou les Constances éprouvées (1656)
- Les Apparences trompeuses (1656)
- Les Coups d'Amour et de Fortune (1656)
- Théodore, reine de Hongrie (1658)

== Sources ==
- "Boisrobert, François Metel De". Chalmers' Biography. Vol. 6. 1812. p. 13.
- Magne, Émile (1909). Le plaisant abbé de Boisrobert, fondateur de l'Académie française, 1592-1662. Documents inédits (1909). Mercure de France.
- Iline, Anastasia (2004). François Le Métel de Boisrobert (1592-1662), écrivain et homme de pouvoir (in French). École des chartes.
- Robert Aldrich; Garry Wotherspoon, eds. (2001). Who's Who in Gay and Lesbian History. Psychology Press. ISBN 9780415159821.
- Denis Hollier; R. Howard Bloch, eds. (1994). A New History of French Literature. Harvard University Press. ISBN 9780674615663.
