= French moralists =

Secular writers who described "personal, social and political conduct" through maxims

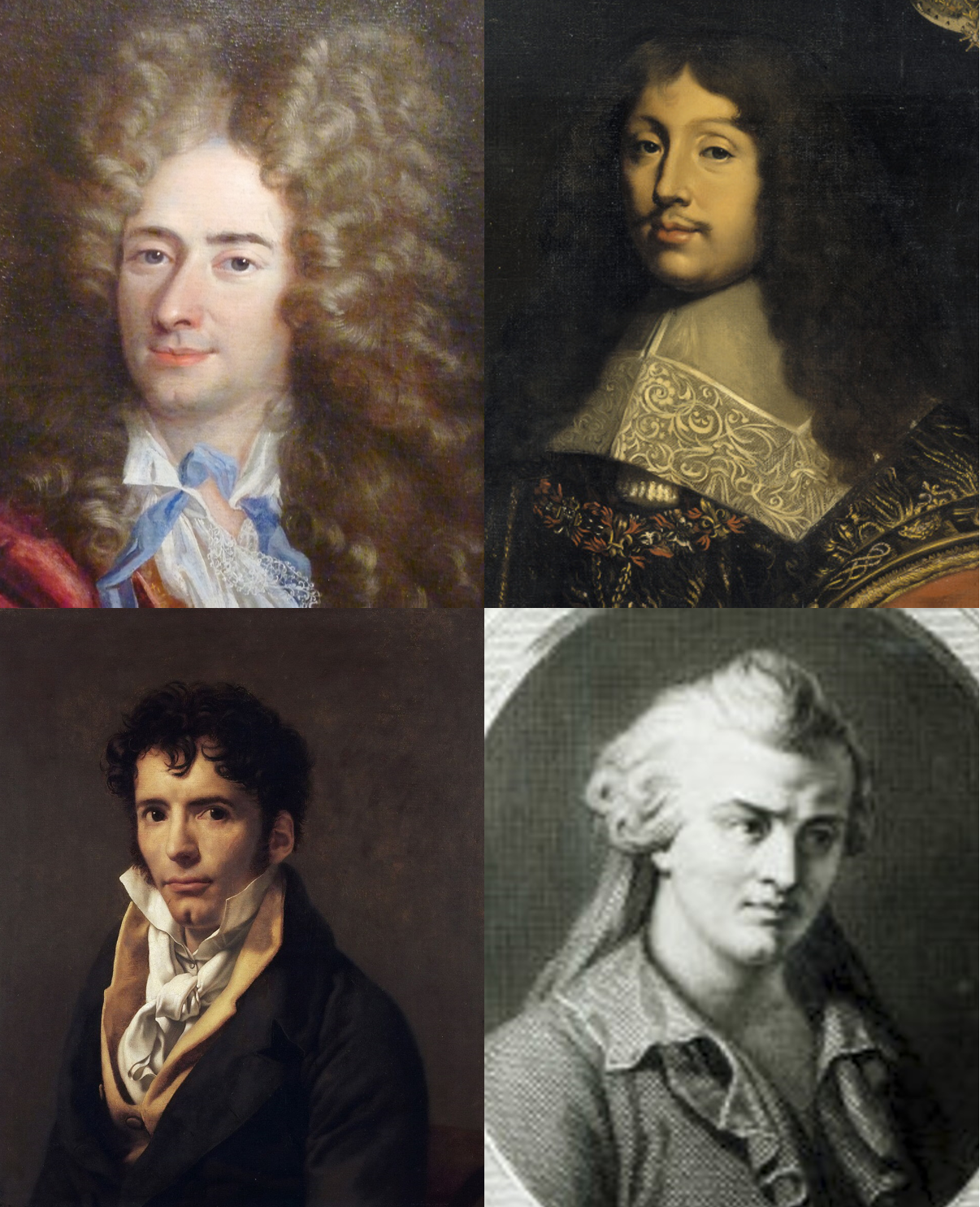
From top left and clockwise: Jean de La Bruyère, François de La Rochefoucauld, Luc de Clapiers, Nicolas Chamfort

In French literature, the moralists (French: moralistes) were a tradition of secular writers who described "personal, social and political conduct", typically through maxims. The tradition is associated with the salons of the Ancien Régime from the 16th through the 18th centuries. The tradition begins with the Essais of Michel de Montaigne (1580), but its heyday was the late 17th century.

Although the moralists wrote essays and pen-portraits, their preferred genre was the maxim. These were short abstract statements devoid of context, often containing paradoxes and always designed to shock or surprise. The moralists aimed for objective and impartial observation freed from the preconceptions of their day. Their approach was never systematic. The four principal moralists and their main works are:

- François de La Rochefoucauld, Réflexions ou sentences et maximes morales (1665)
- Jean de La Bruyère, Caractères ou les moeurs de ce siècle (1688)
- Luc de Clapiers, marquis de Vauvenargues, Introduction à la connaissance de l’esprit humain, suivie de réflexions et maximes (1746)
- Nicolas Chamfort, Maximes et pensées, caractères et anecdotes (1795)
