= Nicolas des Escuteaux =

French novelist

Nicolas des Escuteaux (or the "sieur des Escuteaux", sometimes written "Escuteaus"; after 1570 – c. 1628) was a French novelist from the early 17th century.

== Life ==
He was born into a noble family in the region around Loudun. The Reformation was strong in Loudun, and in terms of religion, Des Escuteaux seems to have been somewhat sympathetic toward the Huguenots.

== Works ==
He was responsible for 13 novels of love and adventure and one anthology published between 1601 and 1628.

Like his contemporaries Antoine de Nervèze and François du Souhait, Des Escuteaux is one of the authors most often associated with the so-called "sentimental novel" (or "amours") published during the reign of Henry IV of France. Unlike these other authors, Des Escuteaux was not a prince's secretary and he apparently only worked on novels and not on plays or works of moral philosophy. The first five novels by Des Escuteaux were dedicated to noble ladies, but it is unsure to what degree he profited from their patronage. These ladies were: Renée de Cossé, who was the daughter of Artus de Cossé, the wife of Charles of Montmorency and the cousin of Charles II de Cossé, duc de Brissac; Isabel de Rochechoüart (dame de Lesé); Lucrèce de Boüillé (mademoiselle de Créance); Jeanne de la Brunetière (dame de Vaudoré); and Catherine de Mars (comtesse douairière de Caravas).

The publication of Nervèze's first novels preceded Des Escuteaux's by two or three years, as too Nervèze's anthology of short novels, but judging from the number of editions and places of publication, it seems that Des Escuteaux's novels had a longer period of success than Nervèze's. Many of Des Escuteaux's novels are more adventurous (pirates, kidnappings, battles) than sentimental, and they clearly show the influence of the Renaissance Hispano-Portuguese adventure novel (like Amadis of Gaul) and the ancient Greek novel (like those of Heliodorus of Emesa and Achilles Tatius). Occasionally however, Des Escuteaux abandons the adventurous tradition for more realistic situations, such as portraying Italian courtly marriage alliances (Clarimond et Antonide) or the impact of the unintended killing of an uncle on the family of the beloved (Lydiam et Floriande).

Des Escuteaux's novels take place in a variety of far-flung settings and historical periods (including in France during the reign of Charles VII of France, the Baltic under the Vandals, Armenia and Cappadocia, and the Eastern coast of Africa (Sofala)) and generally feature a sublimely beautiful virgin lady (whose beauty drives men crazy) and a noble knight who is trying to rescue her.

Des Escuteaux has many passages showing the first tender moments of the lovers' self-discovery and revelation of their feelings, but he also revels in having his chaste female characters fighting back the libidinous attentions of their kidnappers. In a few of his novels, Des Escuteaux abandons the idealized portrait of his female characters and portrays them as flighty, vicious or cruel (vain and avaricious mothers who seek socially advantageous marriages for their daughters are a preferred target of his criticism).

In the first half of the 17th century, Des Escuteaux was often grouped with Nervèze by critics (such as Charles Sorel) who decried their stylized, rhetorically ornate and metaphoric language, but he is an essential figure in the development of language (prefiguring the Précieuses) and the novel in France and had a direct influence on Madeleine de Scudéry and other novelists in the 1640s.

Des Escuteaux novels:

- Les infortunées et chastes amours de Filiris et Isolia (Rouen, 1601), (Paris, 1607)
- Les chastes et heureuses amours de Clarimond et Antonide (Paris, 1601, printed in Saumur), (Rouen, 1602)
- Les avantureuses fortunes d'Ipsilis et Alixée (Poitiers, 1602), (Rouen, 1604) - see below for the sequel and the conclusion
- Les véritables et heureuses amours de Clidamant et Marilinde (Paris, 1603), (Rouen, 1603), (Saumur, 1603)
- Les amours de Lydiam et Floriande (Paris, 1605)
- La Suite des avantureuses fortunes d'Ipsilis et Alixée (Paris, 1605)
- Amours diverses (an anthology of the first four novels) (Rouen, 1607), (Rouen, 1613), (Paris, 1617)
- Les malheureuses amours de Philandre gentilhomme Bourguignon: et de Chrisilde damoiselle Grecque (Paris, 1611)
- Les traversez hasards de Clidion et Arminie (Paris, 1612)
- Les [admirables] faits d'armes d'Alcestes servant l'infidèle Lydie (Saumur, 1613)
- Le ravissement de Clarinde (Rouen, 1617), (Poitiers, 1618), (Rouen, 1627)
- Les fortunes d'Almintes (Saumur, 1623)
- Fin des avantureuses fortunes d'Ypsilis et Alixée (Poitiers, 1623)
- Les jaloux desdains de Chrysis (Poitiers, 1628)
