= Roman à tiroirs =

A roman à tiroirs (French for "novel with/made of drawers") is a French term for a novel in which the principal or main narrative (or "frame story") is interrupted by secondary narratives (involving secondary characters and/or told by other narrators), which may in turn themselves be interrupted by further narratives/narrators. As such, it is a form of the "story within a story" literary device in which the fiction is nested in two or more layers and where the resolution of the main narrative is delayed because of the inserted secondary tales/stories. In French, the embedded narratives are referred to as récits enchâssés or récits emboités.

The expression "à tiroirs" as applied to a work of literature dates from 1752, and appears to have been used originally in reference to theater and plays (a "pièce à tiroirs" or "comédie à tiroirs").

== See also ==
- Story within a story
- Frame story
