= Tobias Venner =

English physician and medical writer

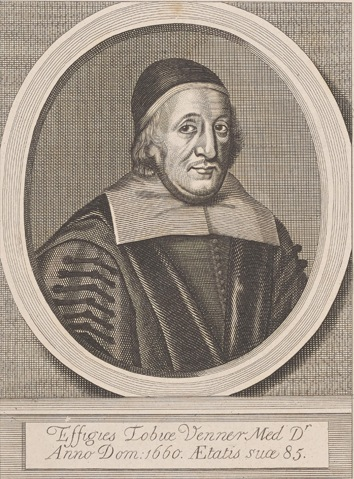
Tobias Venner

Tobias Venner (1577–1660) was an English physician and medical writer, born near North Petherton. He was known for his books aimed at the general public and his promotion of thermal bathing, particularly in the city of Bath.

== Biography ==
Venner completed his Bachelor of Arts and his Master of Arts degrees respectively in 1595 and 1603 at Oxford's Alban's Hall and went to establish his practice in Bridgwater. He then received in 1613 a Bachelor of Medicine and Doctor of Medicine degree at Oxford with a dispensation for non-attendance at lectures. This kind of exemption was granted for various reasons, sometimes unclear, at Oxford at the turn of the 17th century. After marrying Agnes Jeffrye (died 1634), with whom he had four children, he settled in Bath and by 1630 he enjoyed a rather comfortable life there: the sales of his books and his medical practice flourished, and his three sons went to study medicine at Oxford University although one died before graduating.

Tobias Venner died at Bath on 27 March 1660 at the age of 83, outliving all of his children and both wives. He was buried in Bath Abbey, where for many years a monument bore his name.

== Works ==
From 1620 to 1660, various editions of his Via Recta ad Vitam Longam were published in quarto format in London. In addition to its endorsement of thermal waters at Bath, the book gave advice on hygiene and health as well as pursuing Galen's theory of humorism. Venner explains how working on six "non-naturals" factors (environment, diet, sleep, exercise, excretion, and the passions of the mind) could affect the balance of the four humours, blood, phlegm, yellow bile, and black bile, and thus enhance one's quality of life and longevity. In regards to obesity, he is credited in Via Recta with being one of the first to refer to it as a societal and individual disease in an English language publication. Tobias Venner also ventures into nutrition, for example by decrying beef and various fishes as indigestible, or by praising potato as delightful and nutritious, as well as providing a recipe for mead.

In A briefe and accurate treatise concerning the taking of the fume of tobacco (1621), Venner considers tobacco smoking, that was rising in popularity at that time, as a means of improving digestion and offsetting the detrimental effects of cold if taken with moderation, although he recommended it should not be taken for pleasure alone nor too often. Indeed, he foresaw the risk for the lungs to become "unapt for motion, to the great offence of the heart, and ruine at length of the whole body."

== Bibliography ==
- Via Recta ad Vitam Longam (1620)
- A briefe and accurate treatise concerning the taking of the fume of tobacco (1621)
- The baths of Bathe (1628)
