= Heroic romance =

Heroic romance is a class of imaginative literature that flourished in the 17th century, principally in France.

== Characteristics ==
Today, heroic romances are more often grouped into the larger romance genre than discussed individually. As a part of this larger category, heroic romances are distinguished by their vernacular language, their celebration of chivalric adventure, and their taste for the exotic, remote, and miraculous. They generally end happily, and are separated from epics by their sophistication of narrative. Heroic romances flourished during a reawakening of medieval romantic elements and usually featured the pursuit of the valiant for impossible beauty. However, they also captured the language, feeling, and atmosphere of the age. The passion of love is dominant throughout; the object of the hero's affections is usually very beautiful and fiercely loyal. These books were written with an aim that was partly educational. Although they were meant to entertain, their message was also one meant to instill lessons of practical chivalry.

== History ==
The first works of modern fiction in France were primarily pastorals. The celebrated Astrée (1610) of Honoré d'Urfé, the earliest French novel, is structured in this style. Though the focus of this work is more sentimental than action-oriented, it would become the inspiration for a vast body of literature that would take on many and diverse forms. There was a side of the Astrée that encouraged an extravagant love of glory, that spirit of "panache," which was now rising to its height in France.

The fledglings of the genre were published in the 1620s. These earlier works highlight the chivalrous actions of their heroes through hinting that they were well-known public characters of the day in romantic disguises. Yet, the earliest novel that can be attributed to the genre is the celebrated Polexandre (1629) by Marin le Roy, sieur de Gomberville(1600–1674). In this work the romantic character typical of this class of books is celebrated for his birth, his beauty, and his exploits rather than hidden by a disguise. The story deals with the adventures of a hero who visits all the sea-coasts of the world, the most remote as well as the most fabulous, in search of an ineffable princess, Alcidiane. This work enjoyed an immense success, and historical romances of a similar class competed for the favor of the public.

The genre flourished throughout France until around 1660, and was in vogue in England from about 1645 to 1660. British imitations of the French style included Parthenissa, published in 1654 by Roger Boyle, Lord Broghill. This work was greatly admired by Dorothy Osborne and achieved a decent measure of popularity. When the drama, and in particular tragedy, was reinstituted in England, sentimental readers found a field for their emotions on the stage, and the heroic romances immediately began to go out of fashion. However, they lingered for a quarter of a century more, and M. Jusserand has analyzed what may be considered the very latest of the race, Pandion and Amphigenia, published in 1669 by the dramatist, John Crowne. Their influence is still felt in literature today: J. R. R. Tolkien specifically disavowed the descriptor "novel" for his fantasy epic The Lord of the Rings, preferring to call it a kind of "heroic romance".

== Major French works ==
- Ariane (1632) by Desmarets de Saint-Sorlin
- Cassandre (1642–1645), Cleopátre (1647), and Faramond (1661) by Gauthier de Costes, seigneur de la Calprenède
- Ibrahim, ou l'Illustre Bassa (1641), Le Grand Cyrus (1648–1653), and Clélie (1649–1654) by Georges de Scudéry and Madeleine de Scudéry

== Authorities ==
- Gordon de Percel, De l'usage des romans (1734)
- André Le Breton, Le Roman au XVII siècle (1890)
- Paul Morillot, Le Roman en France depuis 1610 (1894)
- JJ Jusserand, Le Roman anglais au XVII siècle (1888)
