= Charles Sorel, sieur de Souvigny =

French writer (c. 1602–1674)

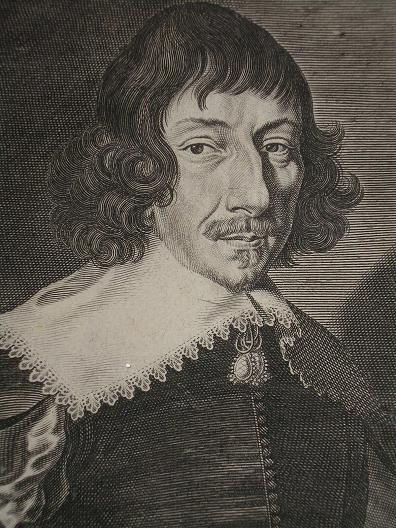
Charles Sorel

Charles Sorel, sieur de Souvigny (c. 1602 – 7 March 1674) was a French novelist and general writer.

== Life ==
Very little is known of his life except that in 1635 he was historiographer of France. He wrote on science, history and religion, but is only remembered for his novels. He tried to destroy the vogue for the pastoral romance by writing a novel of adventure, the Histoire comique de Francion (first edition in seven volumes, 1623; second edition in twelve volumes, 1633). The episodical adventures of Francion found many readers, who nevertheless kept their admiration for Honoré d'Urfé's L'Astrée, which it was intended to ridicule.

Sorel decided to make his intention unmistakable, and in Le Berger extravagant (3 vols, 1627) he wrote a burlesque, in which a Parisian shop-boy, his head turned by sentiment, chooses an unprepossessing mistress and starts life as a shepherd with a dozen sheep on the banks of the Seine. Sorel did not succeed in founding the novel of character, and what he accomplished was more in the direction of farce, but he struck a shrewd blow at heroic romances.

Among his other works are Polyandre (1648) and La Connaissance des bons livres (1671). He died in Paris on 7 March 1674.

== Works by Charles Sorel ==
=== Original editions ===
Bibliography based on Émile Roy:

- - Histoire amoureuse de Cléagénor et de Doristée. Contenant leurs diverses fortunes avec plusieurs autres estranges avantures arrivées de nostre temps, disposées en quatre livres, Paris, Toussainct Du Bray, 1621.
- - Le palais d’Angélie, Paris, Toussainct du Bray, 1622.
- - Nouvelles françaises où se trouvent divers effets de l'amour et de la fortune, Paris, Pierre Billaine, 1623.

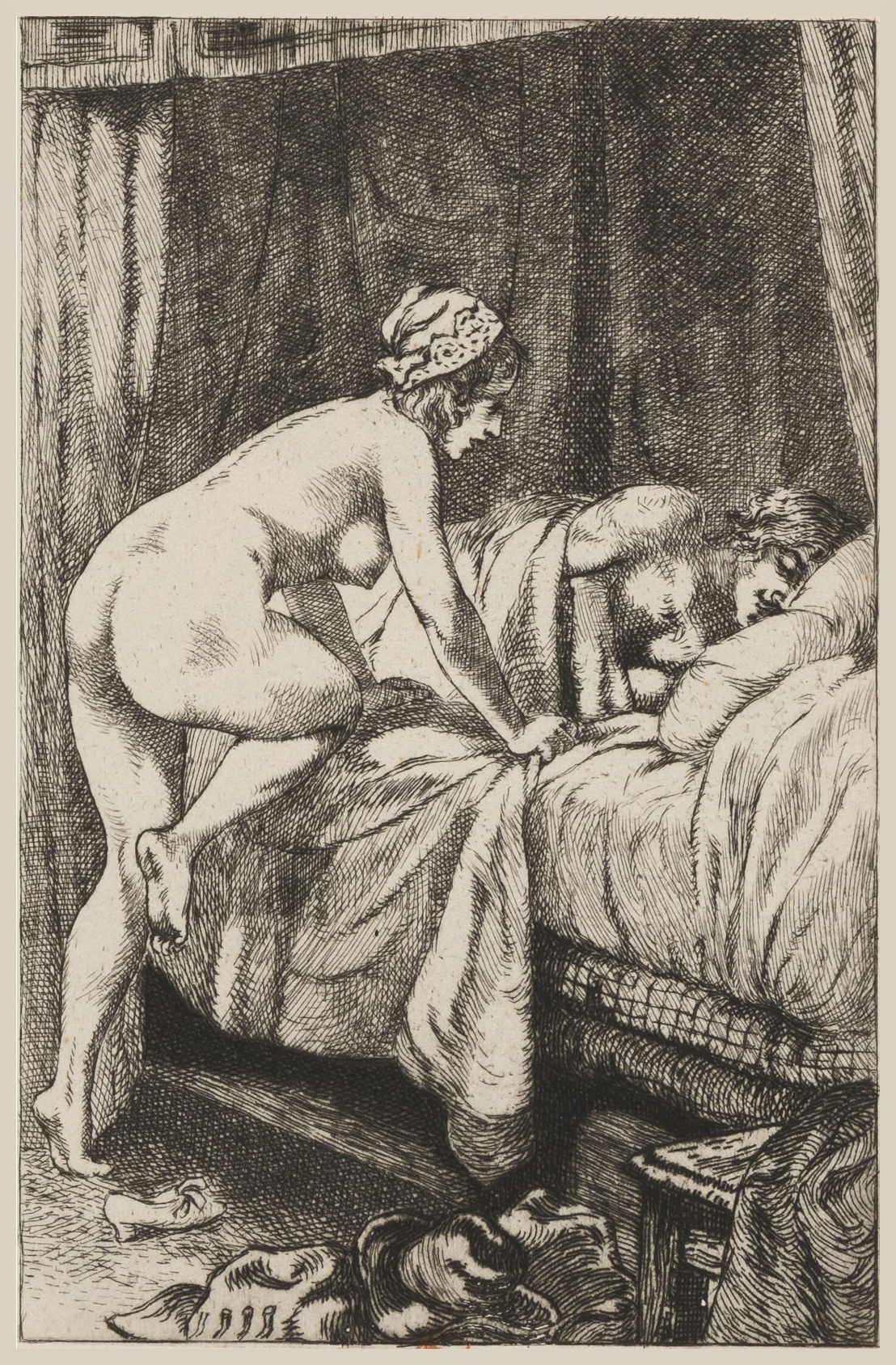
La vraye Histoire comique de Francion, illustration by Martin van Maële

- - L'Histoire comique de Francion, Paris, Pierre Billaine, 1623. Le roman est augmenté en 1626, puis, de nouveau en 1633. Dans cette dernière édition, il est intitulé La vraie histoire comique de Francion et paraît sous le nom de Nicolas de Moulinet, sieur du Parc.
- - L'Orphise de Chrysante, Paris, Toussainct Du Bray, 1626.
- - Le Berger extravagant, Paris, Toussainct Du Bray, (3 volumes) 1627-1628. Réédition sous le titre d' Anti-Roman en 1633, Paris, Toussainct Du Bray. Online text
- - Advertissement sur l’Histoire de la monarchie française, Paris, Claude Morlot, 1628,
- - Histoire de la monarchie française où sont descrits les faicts memorables & les vertus heroïques de nos anciens rois, Paris, Claude Morlot, 1629. Deuxième édition : Paris, Louys Boulanger, 1630.
- - Suite et conclusion de la Polyxene, François Pomeray et Toussaint Du Bray, 1632.
- - Nouveau recueil de lettres, harangues, et discours différents, François Pomeray, 1630. Cf. Olivier Roux, "Réapparition d'un ouvrage égaré" in XVIIe siècle, Presses universitaires de France, n° 242, janvier 2009, p. 159-178.
- - Pensées chrétiennes sur les commandements de Dieu, Paris, Jean Jost, 1634.
- - La vraye suite des adventures de la Polyvene du feu sieur de Moliere, Suivie & concluë sur ses memoires, Paris, Anthoine de Sommaville, 1634.
- - La science des choses corporelles, Paris, Pierre Billaine, 1634. Il s'agit du premier tome de La Science Universelle.
- - Des Talismans ou Figures faites sous certaines constellations... tiré de la seconde partie de la Science des choses corporelles, par le sieur de l'Isle, Paris, Antoine de Sommaville, 1636.
- - Le deuxième tome de La Science Universelle paraît sous le titre de Première partie de la Science universelle, contenant la science des choses corporelles, qui est la vraie physique, Paris, Pierre Billaine, 1637. Il comporte la deuxième partie de l’ouvrage : La science des choses spirituelles.
- - La science universelle de Sorel, où il est traité de l’usage et de la mélioration de toutes les choses du monde, Troisième volume, Paris, Toussaint Quinet, 1641. Les trois premiers volumes de la Science universelle sont réédités en 1647.
- - La perfection de l'âme, dans laquelle on trouve celle de la volonté par la morale practique [...]Quatriesme volume et conclusion de la science universelle de Sorel, Paris, Toussaint Quinet, 1644. Enfin, une dernière édition des quatre parties paraît en 1668.
- - La solitude et l’amour philosophique de Cléomède, Premier sujet des Exercices Moraux de M. Ch. Sorel, Conseiller du Roy & Historiographe de France, Paris, Antoine de Sommaville, 1640.
- - La défense des Catalans, Paris, Nicolas de Sercy, 1642.
- - Remonstrance aux peuples de Flandre. Avec les droicts du Roy sur leurs Provinces, Paris, Nicolas de Sercy, 1642.
- - La Fortune de la Cour, ouvrage curieux tiré des Mémoires d'un des principaux Conseillers du duc d'Alençon, frère du Roy Henri III, Paris, Nicolas de Sercy, 1642.
- - La Maison des jeux, Paris, Nicolas de Sercy, 1642.
- - Les Loix de la Galanterie, in Recueil des pièces les plus agréables de ce temps, Paris, Nicolas de Sercy, 1644. Réédition des Les Loix de la Galanterie : Aubry, Paris, 1855. Online text et

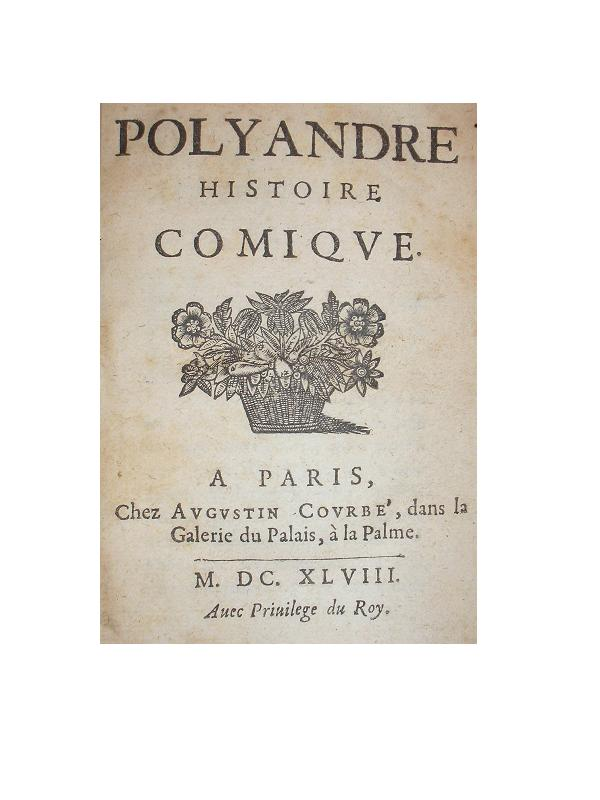
Charles Sorel : Polyandre (1648)

- - Polyandre, Histoire Comique, Paris, Veuve Sercy / Augustin Courbé, 1648.
- - Discours sur l'Académie françoise establie pour la correction et l'embellissement du langage, pour sçavoir si elle est de quelque utilité aux particuliers et au public, et où l'on voit les raisons de part et d'autre sans déguisement, Paris, Guillaume de Luyne, 1654.
- - De la perfection de l'homme, où les vrays biens sont considérez, et spécialement ceux de l'âme, avec les méthodes des sciences, Paris, Robert de Nain, 1655.
- - Description de l'Isle de portraiture et de la ville des portraits, Paris, Charles de Sercy, 1659.
- - Relation véritable de ce qui s'est passé au royaume de Sophie, depuis les troubles excités par la rhétorique et l'éloquence. Avec un discours sur la Nouvelle Allégorique, Paris, Charles de Sercy, 1659.
- - L'Histoire de la monarchie française sous le règne du roy Louis XIV, contenant tout ce qui s'est passé de plus remarquable entre les couronnes de France et d'Espagne, et autres païs estrangers, Paris, Jean-Baptiste Loyson, 1662.
- - Chemin de la fortune ou les bonnes règles de la vie pour acquérir des richesses en toute sorte de conditions et pour obtenir les faveurs de la cour, les honneurs et le crédit, Entretiens d'Ariste sur la vraye science du monde, Paris, Jean-Baptiste Loyson, 1663.
- - Oeuvres diverses, ou Discours meslez, Paris, Compagnie des libraires du Palais, 1663.
- - La bibliothèque française, Paris, Compagnie des libraires du Palais, 1664. Seconde édition en 1667.
- - Divers traités sur les droits et les prérogatives des Roys de France, Tirez des Memoires Historiques & Politiques De M. C. S. S. D. S. , Paris, Compagnie des Marchands libraires du Palais, 1666.
- - De la connoissance des bons livres, ou Examen de plusieurs autheurs, Paris, André Pralard, 1671.
- - Les récréations galantes, contenant : Diverses questions plaisantes... le Passe-temps de plusieurs petits jeux; quelques enseignes en prose; le Blazon des couleurs; l'Explication des songes; et un Traité de la phisionomie, suite et II. partie de la Maison des jeux, Paris, Etienne Loyson, 1671.
- - L'histoire des pensées, mêlée de petits jeux, nouvelle galante, Paris, Etienne Loyson, 1671.
- - De la prudence ou des bonnes règles de la vie pour l'acquisition, la conservation et l'usage légitime des biens du corps et de la fortune, et des biens de l'âme..., Paris, André Pralard, 1673.

=== Modern editions ===
- Histoire comique de Francion, in Romanciers du XVII^{e}, édition établie par Antoine Adam, Gallimard, Pléiade, 1958.
- Histoire comique de Francion, édition de Fausta Garavini chez Folio classique, 1996.
- La Soeur jalouse, extraite des Nouvelles françaises a été publiée par Roger Guichemerre dans Dom Carlos et autres nouvelles françaises du XVII^{e}, folio classique, 1995.
