= Nicolas Faret =

French writer (1600–1646)

Nicolas Faret (Bourg-en-Bresse, c. 1596 – 8 September 1646) was a French statesman, writer, scholar and translator. He was born in Bourg-en-Bresse in about 1596 when the area was still part of the Savoyard state, but it came under the control of France in about 1601. It was after that date within the Duchy of Burgundy. He translated Eutropius's Roman History (Paris, 1621, in-18).
