= Jean de La Bruyère =

French philosopher and moralist (1645–1696)

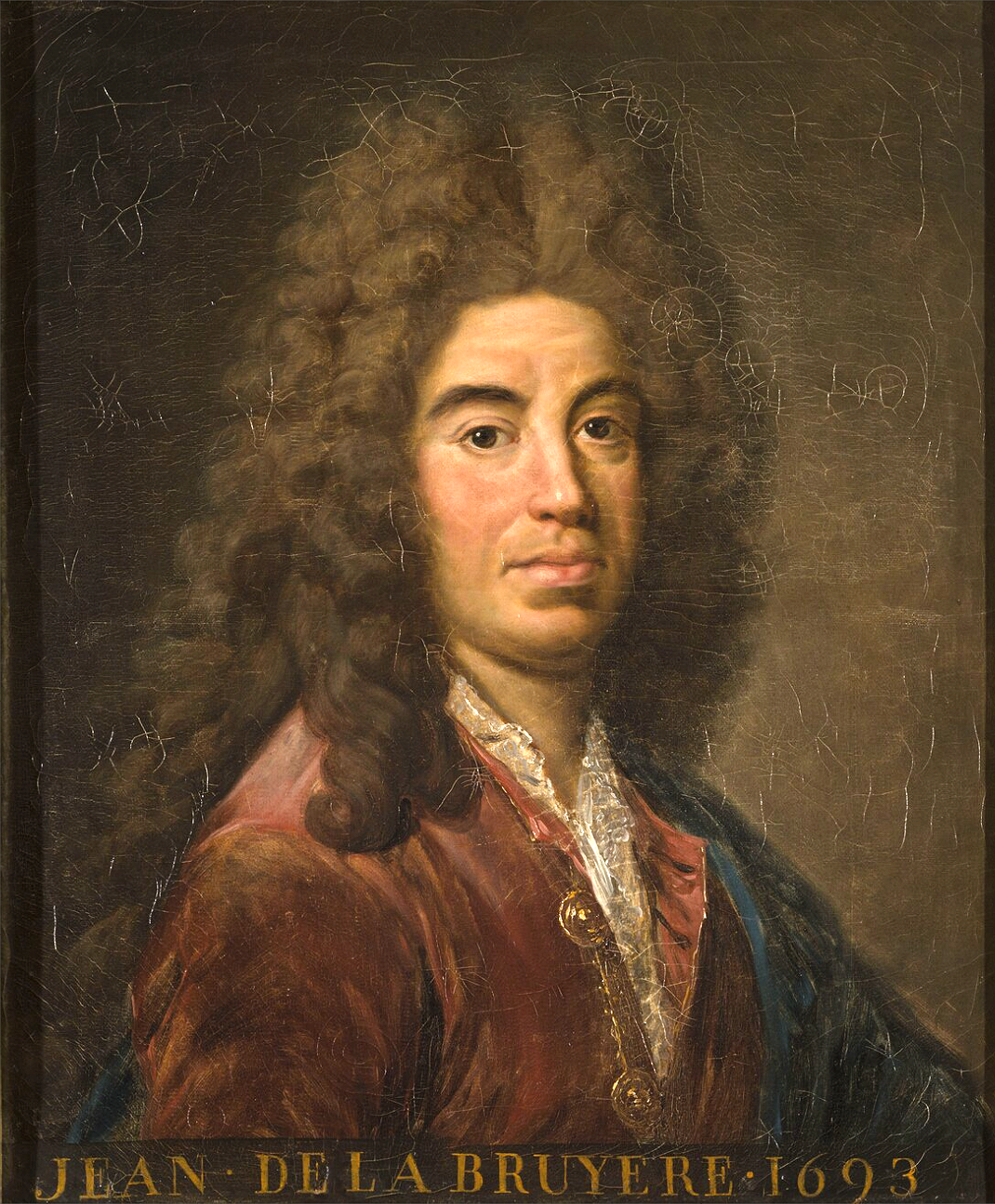
- Painting of Bruyère attributed to Nicolas de Largillière, 1775
- Born: 16 August 1645; Paris, Kingdom of France
- Died: 11 May 1696 (aged 50); Versailles, Kingdom of France
- Writing career
- Language: French
- Period: 17th-century French literature
- Notable awards: Académie française (Seat 36)
- Literary movement: French moralists

Jean de La Bruyère (UK: /ˌlæ bruːˈjɛər/, UK: /ˌlɑː bruːˈjɛər, ˌlɑː briːˈɛər/; French: [ʒɑ̃ d(ə) la bʁɥijɛʁ]; 16 August 1645 – 11 May 1696) was a French philosopher and moralist who was noted for his satire.

== Early years ==
Jean de La Bruyère was born in Paris, in today's Essonne département, in 1645. His family was middle class, and his reference to a certain "Geoffroy de La Bruyère", a crusader, is only a satirical illustration of a method of self-ennoblement then common in France, as in some other countries. As such, he signed his surname as Delabruyère in one word, as evidence of this disdain.

La Bruyère could trace his family back on his father's side at least as far as his great-grandfather, who along with his grandfather had been dedicated members of the Catholic League. His great-grandfather had been exiled from France when Henry IV came to the throne and Catholics fell into disfavor.

La Bruyère's father also had been active in the league under the Duke of Guise in 1584. His father was controller general of finance to the Hôtel de Ville, and despite the turmoil in the country, was able to pay for La Bruyère's education and to leave him a considerable sum as an inheritance.

He was educated by the Oratorians and at the University of Orléans. He was called to the bar, and in 1673 bought a post in the revenue department at Caen, which gave him status and an income. His predecessor in the post was a relation of Jacques Benigne Bossuet, and it is thought that the transaction of the change was the cause of La Bruyère's introduction to the great orator, Bossuet, who, from the date of his own preceptorship of the Dauphin, was a kind of agent-general for tutorships in the royal family, and, in 1684, who introduced La Bruyère to the household of Louis, Grand Condé.

La Bruyère became tutor to the prince's grandson, Louis, as well as to the prince's child-bride, Mlle de Nantes, a natural child of Louis XIV. The rest of his life was passed in the household of the Prince or else at court, and he seems to have profited by the inclination that the entire Condé family had for the society of men of letters.

Very little is known of the events of this part—or, indeed, of any part—of his life. The impression derived from the few notices of him is of a silent, observant, but somewhat awkward man, resembling in manners Joseph Addison.

His critical book, Caractères appeared in 1688. It garnered numerous enemies, but despite that, most notations about him are favorable—notably that of Saint-Simon, an acute judge and one bitterly prejudiced against commoners generally. A curious passage in a letter by Boileau to Racine exists, however, in which the writer regrets that "nature has not made La Bruyère as agreeable as he would like to be."

== Literary activity ==
When La Bruyère's Caractères appeared in 1688, Nicolas de Malézieu predicted at once, that it would bring "bien des lecteurs et bien des ennemis" (many readers and many enemies). That proved to be true.

Foremost among the critics were Thomas Corneille, Bernard le Bovier de Fontenelle, and Isaac de Benserade, who were clearly critical of the book. They were joined by innumerable others, men and women of letters as well as of society, who are identifiable by manuscript "keys" compiled by the scribblers of the day.

The friendship of Bossuet and protection of the Condés sufficiently defended the author, however, and he continued to insert fresh portraits of his contemporaries in each new edition of his book, especially in the fourth edition (1689). Those whom he had attacked were powerful in the Académie française, however, and numerous defeats awaited La Bruyère before he could make his way into becoming a member among their ranks.

He was defeated three times in 1691, and on one memorable occasion, he had but seven votes, five of which were those of Bossuet, Boileau, Racine, Paul Pellisson, and Bussy-Rabutin.

It was not until 1693 that he was elected, and even then, an epigram, which, considering his admitted insignificance in conversation, was not of the worst, haeret lateri:

"Quand La Bruyère se présente
Pourquoi faut il crier haro?
Pour faire un nombre de quarante
Ne falloit il pas un zéro?"

His unpopularity was, however, chiefly confined to the subjects of his sarcastic portraiture and to the hack writers of the time, of whom he was wont to speak with a disdain only surpassed by that of Alexander Pope. His description of the Mercure galant as "immédiatement au dessous de rien" (immediately below nothing) is the best-remembered specimen of these unwise attacks; and would, of itself, account for the enmity of the editors, Fontenelle and the younger Corneille.

La Bruyère's discourse of admission at the academy, one of the best of its kind, was, like his admission itself, severely criticized, especially by the partisans of the "Moderns" in the "Ancient and Modern" quarrel.

La Bruyère died very suddenly, and not long after his admission to the academy. He is said to have been struck dumb in a gathering of his friends, and, being carried home to the Hôtel de Condé, to have expired of apoplexy a day or two afterward. It is not surprising that, considering contemporary panic about poisoning, the bitter personal enmities that he had excited, and the peculiar circumstances of his death, suspicions of foul play should have been entertained, but there was apparently no foundation for them.

The Caractères, a translation of Theophrastus, and a few letters mostly addressed to the prince de Condé, complete the list of his literary work, with the addition of one curious, and much-disputed, posthumous treatise.

Two years after his death, a certain Dialogues sur le Quiétisme appeared, alleged to have been found among his papers, incomplete, and to have been completed by its editor. As these dialogues are far inferior in literary merit to La Bruyère's other works, their genuineness has been denied. A straightforward and circumstantial account of their appearance was given by the editor, the Abbé du Pin, however. He was a man of acknowledged probity and he knew of the intimacy of La Bruyère with Bossuet, whose views in his contest with Fénelon these dialogues are designed to further, at so short a time after the alleged author's death, and without a single protest on the part of his friends and representatives, all of which seems to have been decisive in the acceptance of authorship.

== The Caractères ==
Although it is permissible to doubt whether the value of the Caractères has not been somewhat exaggerated by traditional French criticism, they deserve a high place.

The plan of the book is thoroughly original, if that term may be accorded to a novel, and skillful combination of elements exists in it. The treatise of Theophrastus may have furnished the concept, but it gave little more. With the ethical generalizations and social Dutch paintings accompanying his original, La Bruyère combined the peculiarities of the Montaigne Essais, of the Pensées, and Maximes of which Pascal and La Rochefoucauld are the masters respectively, and lastly of that peculiar seventeenth-century product, the "portrait" or elaborate literary picture of the personal and mental characteristics of an individual. The result was quite unlike anything that had been seen previously, and, it has not been exactly reproduced since, although the essay of Addison and Steele resembles it very closely, especially in the introduction of fancy portraits.

La Bruyère's privileged position at Chantilly provided him with a unique vantage point from which he could witness the hypocrisy and corruption of the court of Louis XIV. As a Christian moralist, he aimed at reforming people's manners and ways by publishing records of his observations of aristocratic foibles and follies, which earned him many enemies at the court.

In the titles of his work, and in its extreme desultoriness, La Bruyère reminds the reader of Montaigne, but he aimed too much at sententiousness to attempt even the apparent continuity of the great essayist. The short paragraphs of which his chapters consist are made up of maxims proper, of criticisms literary and ethical, and above all, of the celebrated sketches of individuals baptized with names taken from the plays and romances of the time.

These last are the feature of the work which gave it its immediate popularity. They are considered to be piquant, extraordinarily lifelike, and to have conferred pleasure or exquisite pain to the apparent subjects.

== See also ==
- French moralists
