= List of French novelists =

This is a list of novelists from France. Novelists in this list should be notable in some way, and have Wikipedia articles on them.

See also French novelists Category Index.

== Born before 1800 ==
- Antoine de la Sale (1385-1460/61)
- Philippe Camus (writer) (fl. 15th century)
- Sébastien Mamerot (between c. 1418 and 1440–1490)
- Dr. François Rabelais (between 1483 and 1494–1553)
- François de Belleforest (1530–1 January 1583)
- François Béroalde de Verville (27 April 1556 – 19–26 October 1626)
- Nicolas de Montreux (c. 1561–1608)
- Marie de Gournay (1565–1645)
- Honoré d'Urfé (1568–1625)
- Antoine de Nervèze (c. 1570-after 1622)
- François du Souhait (between 1570 and 1580–1617)
- Jean Ogier de Gombauld (1576–1666)
- Charles Sorel (c. 1602–1674)
- Madeleine de Scudéry (1607–1701)
- Madame de Lafayette (1634–1693), author of La Princesse de Clèves
- Alain-René Le Sage (1668–1747)
- Pierre de Marivaux (1688–1763)
- Voltaire (1694–1778), philosophe, satirist, playwright, author of Candide
- Françoise de Graffigny (1695–1758), author of Lettres d'une Péruvienne
- Abbé Prévost (1697–1763), author of Manon Lescaut
- Claude Prosper Jolyot de Crébillon (1707–1777)
- Jean-Jacques Rousseau (1712–1778), philosophe, author of Julie, or the New Heloise
- Denis Diderot (1713–1784), philosophe, author of Rameau's Nephew
- Marie Jeanne Riccoboni (1714–1792)
- Restif de la Bretonne (1734–1806)
- Jacques-Henri Bernardin de Saint-Pierre (1737–1814), author of Paul et Virginie
- Marquis de Sade (1740–1814), author of "Dialogue Between a Priest and a Dying Man", Justine, The 120 Days of Sodom, Philosophy in the Bedroom, and Juliette
- Choderlos de Laclos (1741–1803), author of Les Liaisons dangereuses
- Anne Louise Germaine de Staël (1766–1817)
- Benjamin Constant (1767–1830), author of Adolphe
- Sophie de Renneville (1772–1822), writer, editor, journalist
- François-René de Chateaubriand (1768–1848), author of Atala and René
- Étienne Pivert de Senancour (1770–1846)
- Charles Nodier (1780–1844)
- Fanny Tercy (1782–1851), author of Pierre et Marcellin; sister-in-law of Charles Nodier
- Stendhal (1783–1842), author of The Red and the Black, considered by some to be the first modern novel, and The Charterhouse of Parma
- Élise Voïart, (1786–1866), writer and translator
- Charles Paul de Kock (1793–1871)
- Antoinette Henriette Clémence Robert (1797–1872)
- Charles Dezobry (1798–1871), historian and historical novelist
- Honoré de Balzac (1799–1850), author of La Comédie Humaine, a series of novels presenting a full picture of France in the early 19th century

== Born 1800–1900 ==
- Alexandre Dumas, père (1802–1870), author of The Count of Monte Cristo and The Three Musketeers
- Victor Hugo (1802–1885), author of The Hunchback of Notre-Dame and Les Misérables
- Prosper Mérimée (1803–1870), author of Carmen
- Charles Augustin Sainte-Beuve (1804–1869)
- George Sand (1804–1876), pseudonym of Amantine Aurore Lucile Dupin, Baroness Dudevant
- Eugène Sue (1804–1857)
- Jules Amédée Barbey d'Aurevilly (1808–1889)
- Alfred de Musset (1810–1857)
- Théophile Gautier (1811–1872)
- Gustave Flaubert (1821–1880), author of Madame Bovary and Sentimental Education
- Edmond de Goncourt (1822–1896)
- Henri Murger (1822–1861), author of Scènes de la vie de bohème
- Alexandre Dumas, fils (1824–1895), author of La Dame aux camélias
- Edmond About (1828–1885)
- Jules Verne (1828–1905), writer of techno-thrillers like Twenty Thousand Leagues Under the Seas, and founding father of science fiction
- Pauline Cassin Caro (1828/34/35 – 1901), novelist
- Jules de Goncourt (1830–1870)
- Hector Malot (1830–1907)
- Émile Gaboriau (1832–1873), pioneer of modern detective fiction
- Jules Vallès (1832–1885)
- Eugène Le Roy (1836–1907)
- Alphonse Daudet (1840–1897)
- Émile Zola (1840–1902), naturalist, author of Germinal and Nana
- Anatole France (1844–1924)
- Léon Bloy (1846–1917)
- Brada (1847–1938)
- Joris-Karl Huysmans (1848–1907), author of À rebours and Là-bas
- Guy de Maupassant (1850–1893)
- Pierre Loti (1850–1923)
- Élémir Bourges (1852–1925)
- Paul Bourget (1852–1935)
- René Bazin (1853–1932)
- Hermine Lecomte du Noüy (1854–1915)
- Adolphe Chenevière (1855–19??)
- Claude Ferval (1856–1943)
- Jean Bertheroy (1858–1927)
- Jean de La Brète (1858–1945)
- Maurice Barrès (1862–1923)
- Henri Ardel (1863–1938)
- Henri de Régnier (1864–1936)
- Jules Renard (1864–1910)
- Mathilde Alanic (1864–1948)
- Marie Léra (1864–1958)
- Juliette Heuzey (1865–1952)
- Romain Rolland (1866–1944), Nobel Prize in Literature, 1915
- Gaston Leroux (1868–1927), author of The Phantom of the Opera and The Mystery of the Yellow Room which is recognized as the first locked room puzzle mystery novel
- Gabrielle Réval (1869–1938)
- André Gide (1869–1951)
- Henry Bordeaux (1870–1963)
- Marcel Proust (1871–1922), author of In Search of Lost Time, sometimes seen as the greatest modernist novel
- Colette (1873–1954), best known for Gigi and Chéri
- Alfred Jarry (1873–1907), satirist, inventor of Pataphysics
- Jeanne Landre (1874–1936), journalist, critic and novelist
- Fanny Clar (1875–1944)
- Louisa Emily Dobrée (fl. c. 1877–1917)
- Roger Martin du Gard (1881–1958), Nobel Prize in Literature, 1937
- Louis Pergaud (1882–1915)
- Rose Combe (1883–1932)
- Georges Duhamel (1884–1966)
- François Mauriac (1885–1970), Nobel Prize in Literature, 1952
- Jules Romains (1885–1972)
- Alain-Fournier (1886–1914)
- Ève Paul-Margueritte (1885–1971)
- Lucie Paul-Margueritte (1886–1955)
- René Maran (1887–1960)
- Georges Bernanos (1888–1948)
- Adrien Bertrand (1888–1917)
- Henri Bosco (1888–1976)
- Pierre Drieu La Rochelle (1893–1945), author of Gilles and The Fire Within
- Louis Ferdinand Céline (1894–1961), author of Journey to the End of the Night and Death on the Installment Plan or Mort à Crédit
- Rose Celli (1895–1982)
- Henri de Montherlant (1895–1972)
- Jean Giono (1895–1970)

== Born in or after 1900 ==
- Julien Green (1900–1998)
- Antoine de Saint-Exupéry (1900–1944)
- Nathalie Sarraute (1900–1999)
- André Malraux (1901–1976)
- Marie-Magdeleine Carbet (1902–1996)
- Irène Némirovsky (1903–1942), author of Suite française
- Raymond Queneau (1903–1976)
- Pierre Herbart (1903–1974)
- Marguerite Yourcenar (1903–1987)
- Raymond Radiguet (1903–1923)
- Jean-Paul Sartre (1905–1980), Nobel Prize in Literature, 1964
- Jeanine Delpech (1905–1992)
- Louise Aslanian (1906–1945), pseudonym "Las", author of "The Way of doubt".(1956–...)
- Paul Gadenne (1907–1956)
- Pauline Réage (1907–1998)
- Simone de Beauvoir (1908–1986)
- Paul Berna (1908–1994)
- Alix André (1909–2000)
- Jean Genet (1910–1986)
- Jean-Louis Baghio'o (1910–1994)
- Raphaël Tardon (1911–1967)
- Henri Troyat (1911–2007)
- Pierre Boulle (1912–1994), author of The Bridge on the River Kwai and Planet of the Apes
- Albert Camus (1913–1960), Nobel Prize in Literature, 1957
- Gilbert Cesbron (1913–1979)
- Albert Cossery (1913–2008)
- Claude Simon (1913–2005), Nobel Prize in Literature, 1985
- Romain Gary (1914–1980), winner of the Goncourt prize twice, 1956, and 1975 under the pseudonym of Emile Ajar
- Marguerite Duras (1914–1996)
- Joseph Zobel (1915–2006)
- Maurice Druon (1918–2009)
- Boris Vian (1920–1959)
- Alain Robbe-Grillet (1922–2008)
- Salvat Etchart (1924–1985)
- Michel Tournier (1924–2016)
- Philippe Daudy (1925–1994)
- Michel Butor (1926–2016)
- Édouard Glissant (1928–2011)
- André Schwarz-Bart (1928–2006)
- Sébastien Japrisot (1931–2003)
- Emmanuelle Arsan (1932–2005)
- Jean Bernabé (1942–2017)
- Régine Deforges (1935–2014)
- Françoise Sagan (1935–2004)
- Georges Perec (1936–1982)
- Maryse Condé (1934–2024)
- J.M.G. Le Clézio (born 1940), Nobel Prize in Literature, 2008
- Annie Ernaux (born 1940), Nobel Prize in Literature, 2022
- Marie-Reine de Jaham (born 1940)
- Patrick Modiano (born 1945), Nobel Prize in Literature, 2014
- Daniel Maximin (born 1947)
- Raphaël Confiant (born 1951)
- Carole Achache (1952–2016)
- Kama Sywor Kamanda (born 1952)
- Patrick Chamoiseau (born 1953)
- Nancy Huston (born 1953)
- Frederic Monneyron (born 1954)
- Florence Cadier (born 1956)
- Gisèle Pineau (born 1956)
- Fred Vargas (born 1957)
- Michel Houellebecq (born 1958), Impact award winner
- Itxaro Borda (born 1959), Euskadi prize winner
- Éric-Emmanuel Schmitt (born 1960)
- Charles Dantzig (born 1961)
- Pavel Hak (born 1962)
- Marie-Hélène Lafon (born 1962), winner of the Prix Goncourt de la Nouvelle, 2016
- Beatrice Hammer (born 1963)
- Nadine Ribault (1964–2021)
- Sedef Ecer (born 1965)
- Basile Panurgias (born 1967)
- Éric Vuillard (born 1968), winner of the Prix Goncourt, 2017
- Fabienne Kanor (born 1970)
- Laurent Binet (born 1972)
- Maëlle Guillaud (born 1974)
- Katia Astafieff (born 1975)
- Tristan Garcia (born 1981)
- Caroline Laurent (born 1988)
- Édouard Louis (born 1992)

== See also ==
- French literature
- Francophone literature
- List of French-language authors
- List of French-language poets
- List of French people
- List of novelists
- List of people by nationality
- List of people by occupation
