= Women in ancient Sparta =

"Why are you Spartan women the only ones who can rule men?"
"Because we are also the only ones who give birth to men."

— Gorgo, Queen of Sparta and wife of Leonidas, as quoted by Plutarch

Spartan women were famous in ancient Greece for seemingly having more freedom than women elsewhere in the Greek world. To contemporaries outside of Sparta, Spartan women had a reputation for promiscuity and controlling their husbands. Spartan women could legally own and inherit property, and they were usually better educated than their Athenian counterparts. The surviving written sources are limited and largely from a non-Spartan viewpoint. Anton Powell wrote that to say the written sources are "'not without problems'... as an understatement would be hard to beat".

Similar to other places in ancient Greece, in Sparta, far more is known about the elites than the lower classes, and ancient sources do not discuss gender in relation to the non-citizens (e.g. helots) who constituted the majority of the population of the Spartan state.

== Sources ==
Sparta is one of only three states in ancient Greece, along with Athens and Gortyn, for which any detailed information about the role of women survives. This evidence is mostly from the Classical period and later, but many of the laws and customs we know of probably date back to the Archaic period. The literary sources which give us the most information about women's lives in Sparta are written exclusively by non-Spartans; they are also exclusively written by men. Non-literary sources, including archaeology and ancient art, are limited.

The earliest evidence about the lives of Spartan women come from archaic Greek poetry, such as the partheneia ("maiden songs") of Alcman, a Lydian poet who lived and worked in Sparta in the seventh century BC. Other important sources are Herodotus, fifth-century Athenian drama, and fourth-century Athenian political treatises, including Xenophon’s Constitution of the Spartans and Aristotle's Politics. In the Roman period, sources include Plutarch's biographies and collections of sayings and customs of the Spartans and Pausanias' guide to Laconia.

== Childhood ==
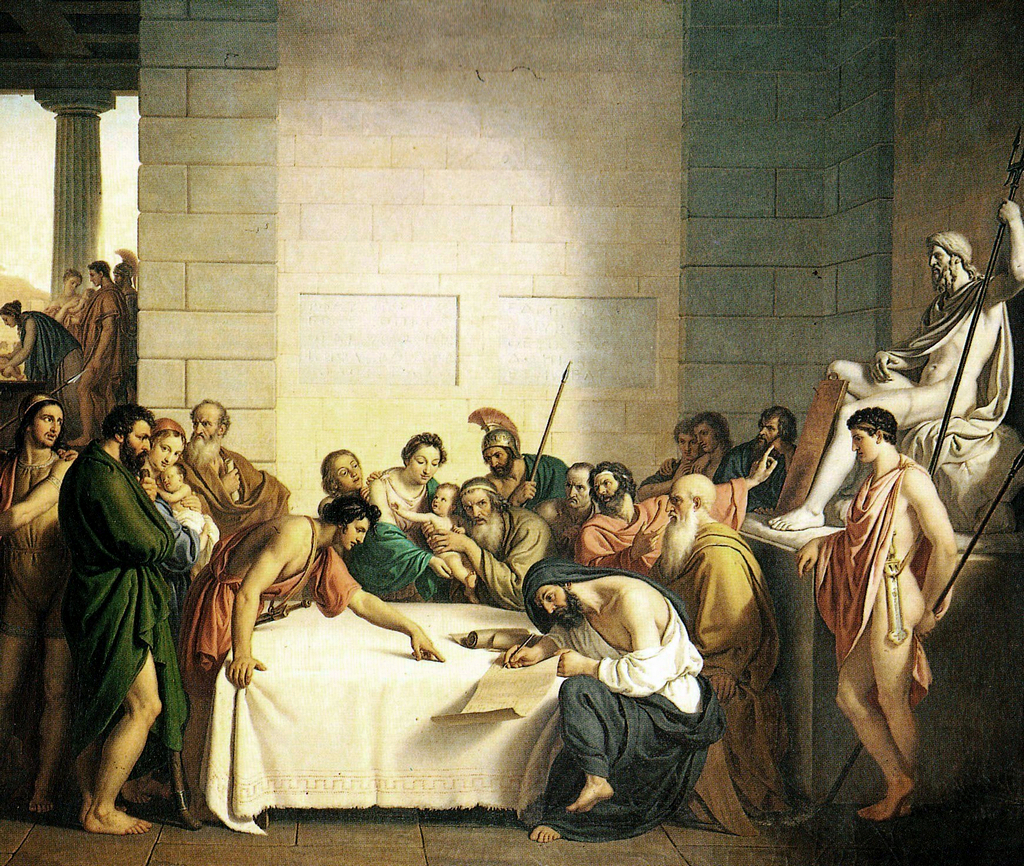
According to Plutarch, Spartan children were assessed at birth, and those judged to be unhealthy were left to die. This painting by Giuseppe Diotti shows a baby being judged. It is unclear whether female children also suffered this treatment.

According to Plutarch, Spartans practiced infanticide as a matter of course if children were thought to be unhealthy. It is unclear whether this applied to girls as well as boys, though evidence from elsewhere in Plutarch and Xenophon implies that it did not. It is likely that girls were simply given into the care of their mothers immediately after birth, though there is not enough evidence to say whether this was the case throughout Spartan history. Female Spartan babies were as well fed as their male counterparts – in contrast to Athens, where boys were better fed than girls – in order to have physically fit women to carry children and give birth.

=== Education ===
Information about the education of Spartan women is hard to find as there are more surviving sources about the education of Spartan boys. In Sparta, boys were educated in the agoge from the age of seven, at least during some periods of Spartan history. It is likely that whenever the state arranged for the education of boys, it also institutionalized the education of girls. Unlike their male counterparts, Spartan girls would have been raised at home with their mothers while undergoing their education. They would learn about the duties and responsibilities of looking after the home, largely because the males of the household were often away. There is evidence for some form of official educational program for girls as early as the archaic period, and this system seems to have been discontinued in the Hellenistic period. The extent to which education for girls was restored under the reforms of Cleomenes III is unclear, but it may have become voluntary rather than compulsory. State-supervised education for girls was once again abolished in 188 BC and restored in the Roman period.

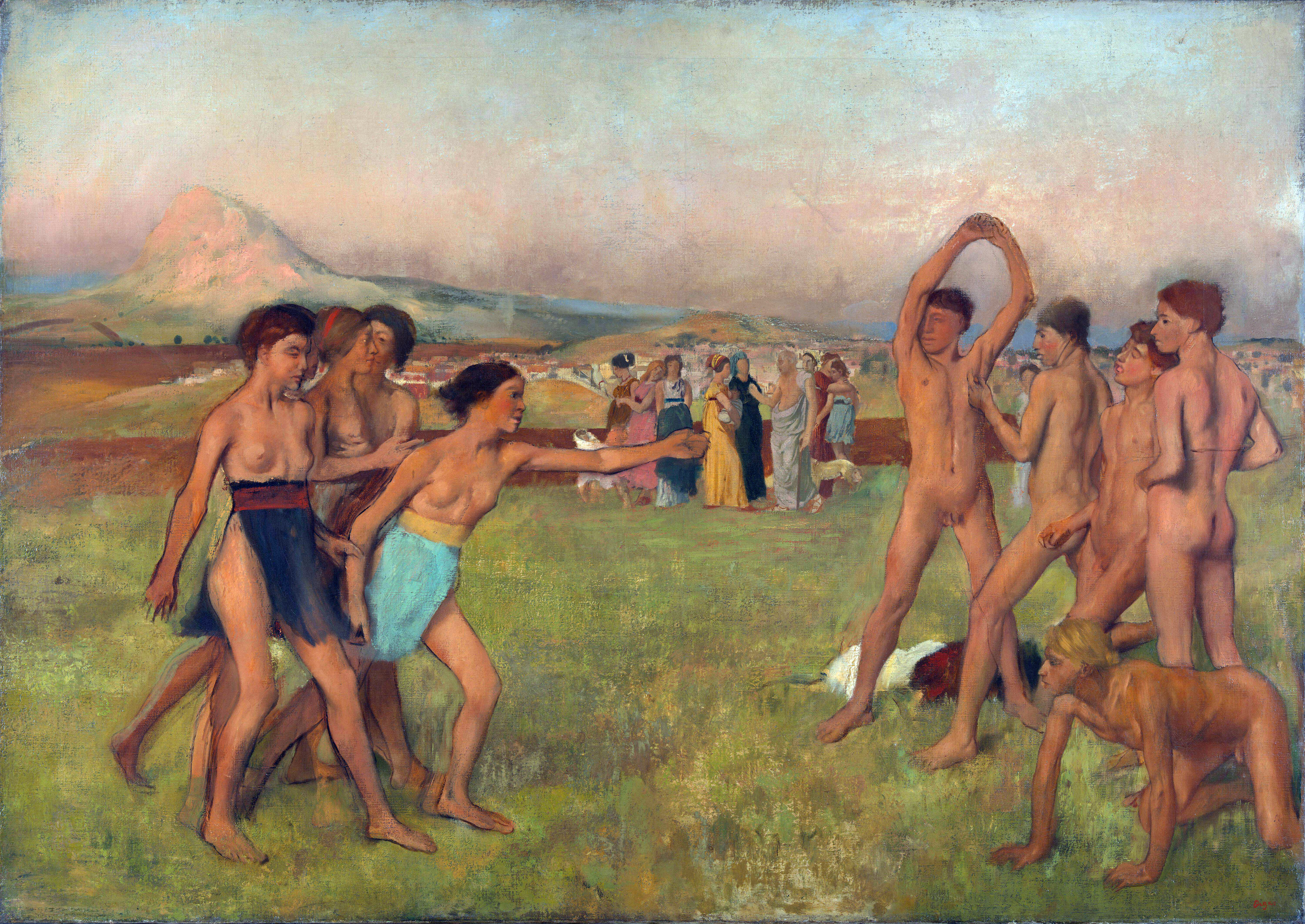
Young Spartans Exercising by Edgar Degas, c. 1860.

Literacy in Sparta was a skill limited to the elite. However, there is evidence from the Classical period that some women could read. For instance, anecdotes about Sparta are preserved which feature mothers writing letters to their sons who were away. A reference by Aristophanes to a Spartan woman poet, Cleitagora, and the Spartan Pythagoreans listed by Iamblichos, suggest that some Spartan women may have been highly literate.

As well as reading and writing, women studied mousike – which consisted of not just music, but also dance and poetry. Women seem to have learned to play musical instruments, as shown in surviving statuettes. Mousike was an important part of Spartan religious activity, particularly as part of the cults of Helen and Artemis. Spartan girls danced in choruses made up of girls of similar ages, and they were led by an older girl (chorēgos), and trained by a professional poet. Along with training in song and dance, these choruses educated girls in ritual and cultic activity. Dance also provided physical benefits: in Aristophanes' Lysistrata, the Spartan character Lampito attributes her fitness to the Laconian dance known as the bibasis, which involved buttock kicks and leaps. The bibasis was a competition that both Spartan men and women competed in to win prizes. Finally, the songs to which the girls danced provided an opportunity to inculcate them with Spartan values and gender roles.

=== Athletics ===
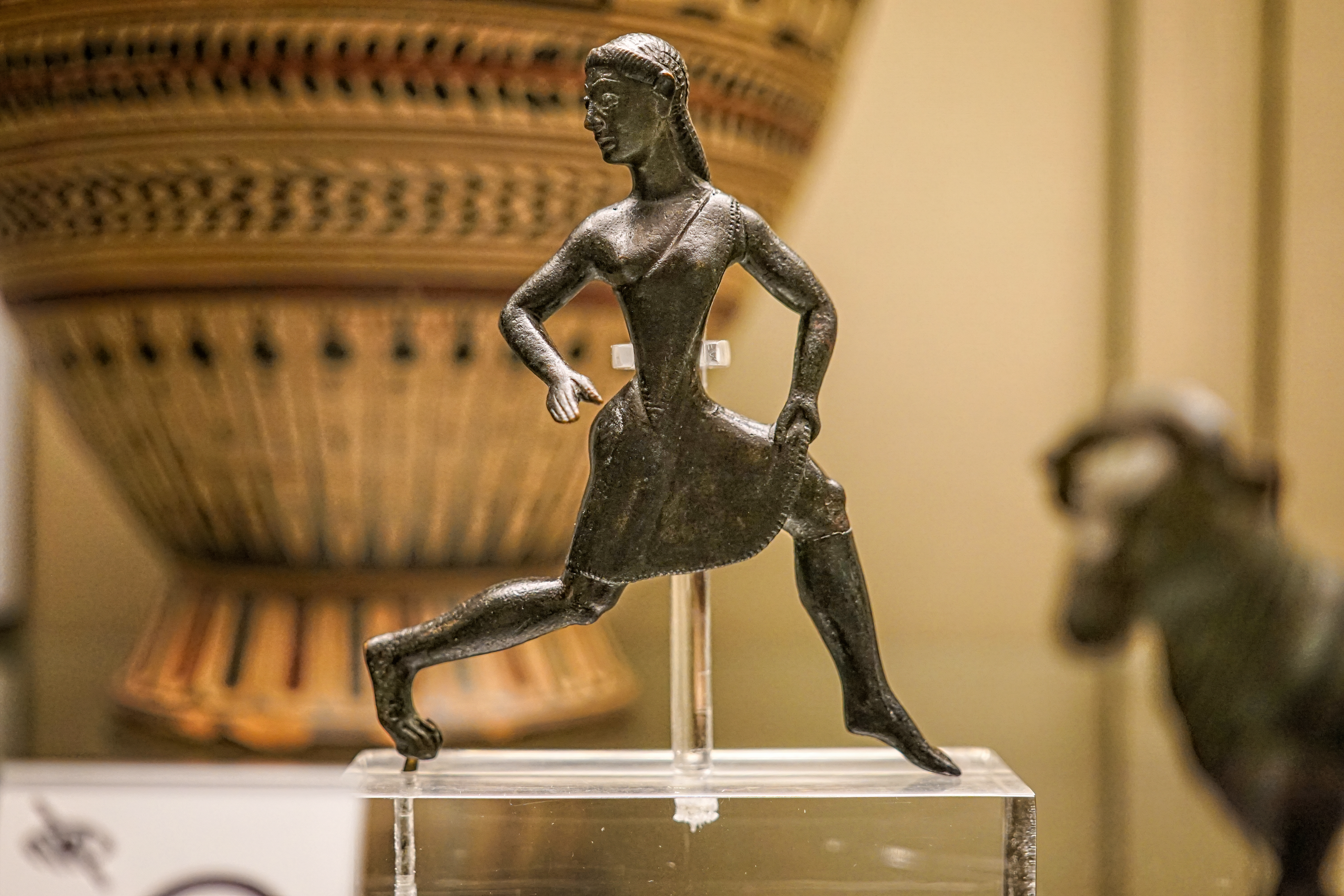
Spartan bronze figure of a running girl, wearing a single-shouldered chiton (British Museum)

Unlike elsewhere in Greece, in Sparta, unmarried girls regularly participated in sports. The Spartan exercise regimen for girls was designed to make them "every bit as fit as their brothers", though unlike their brothers they did not actually train for combat. In his Constitution of the Spartans, Xenophon reports that Lycurgus required that women should exercise just as much as men, and to this end instituted athletic competitions for women.

Early sources report that Spartan girls practiced running and wrestling; later texts also mention throwing the javelin and discus, boxing, and pankration. They also learned to ride, and votive offerings have been discovered depicting Spartan women on horseback. It is possible that Spartan girls exercised naked, because Archaic Spartan art portrays naked girls, unlike the art of other areas of Greece. Roman sources describe Spartan girls participating in mixed-sex athletic activities alongside Spartan boys; this may have been the case during the Roman period but is unlikely before that point.

Girls might have competed in gymnopaedia, the Spartan festival of naked youths. They also competed in running races for various festivals, of which the most prestigious was the Heraean Games. In the Roman period, games were established at Sparta in honour of the empress Livia which included a girls' footrace. Upon marrying, Spartan women likely ceased participating in athletics.

== Marriage ==
Spartan women seem to have married relatively late in comparison to their counterparts elsewhere in Greece. While Athenian women might have expected to marry for the first time around the age of fourteen to men much older than them, Spartan women normally married between the ages of eighteen and twenty to men close to them in age. Spartan men under the age of thirty were not permitted to live with their wives, instead they were expected to live communally with other members of their syssitia. Due to the husband's absence, women were expected to run the household largely alone. Unlike in Athens, where state ideology held that men were in charge of the household, Sue Blundell argues that in Sparta it is likely that women's control of the domestic sphere was accepted, and possibly even encouraged, by the state.

According to Spartan ideology, the primary role of adult women was to bear and raise healthy children. This focus on childbearing was likely responsible for the emphasis on physical fitness in Spartan women, as it was believed that physically stronger women would have healthier children. Before marriage, there was a trial period for the potential couple to ensure that they could have children; if they could not, divorce and remarriage was the customary solution. For Spartans, all activities involving marriage revolved around the single purpose of producing strong children and thus improving their military.

Spartan marriages could also be arranged based on one's wealth and status. The evidence for the role of kurioi (male guardians) in arranging Spartan women's marriages is not decisive, though Paul Cartledge believes that, like their Athenian (and unlike their Gortynian) counterparts, it was the responsibility of the kurios to arrange a Spartan woman's marriage.

There is some evidence in ancient sources that the Spartans practiced polygyny. Herodotus says that the bigamy of Anaxandridas II, who married a second wife because his first had not been able to produce an heir, was un-Spartan, but Polybius wrote that it was common at his time, and a time-honoured practice. Andrew Scott suggests that polygyny would have been more common in ancient Sparta in the early 4th century BC, when the number of Spartan citizen men sharply decreased. Along with plural marriage, Xenophon states that older men with younger wives were encouraged to allow younger, more fit men impregnate their wives, in order to produce stronger children. Further, Polybius claims that when a man had enough children, it was a Spartan custom for him to give his wife to another man so that he too might have children.

=== Marriage ritual ===
On the night of the wedding, the bride would have her hair cut short and be dressed in a man's cloak and sandals. The bride appeared dressed like a man or a young boy to be perceived as less threatening to her husband. The bride was then left alone in a darkened room, where she would be visited and ritually captured (Ancient Greek: ἁρπάζω, romanized: harpazō, lit. 'to snatch') by her new husband. Men were expected to visit their new wives at night and in secret. The purpose of this was to make it more difficult for new couples to consummate their marriage, which was thought to increase the desire between husband and wife, and lead to the creation of stronger children.

=== Matriarchal duties ===
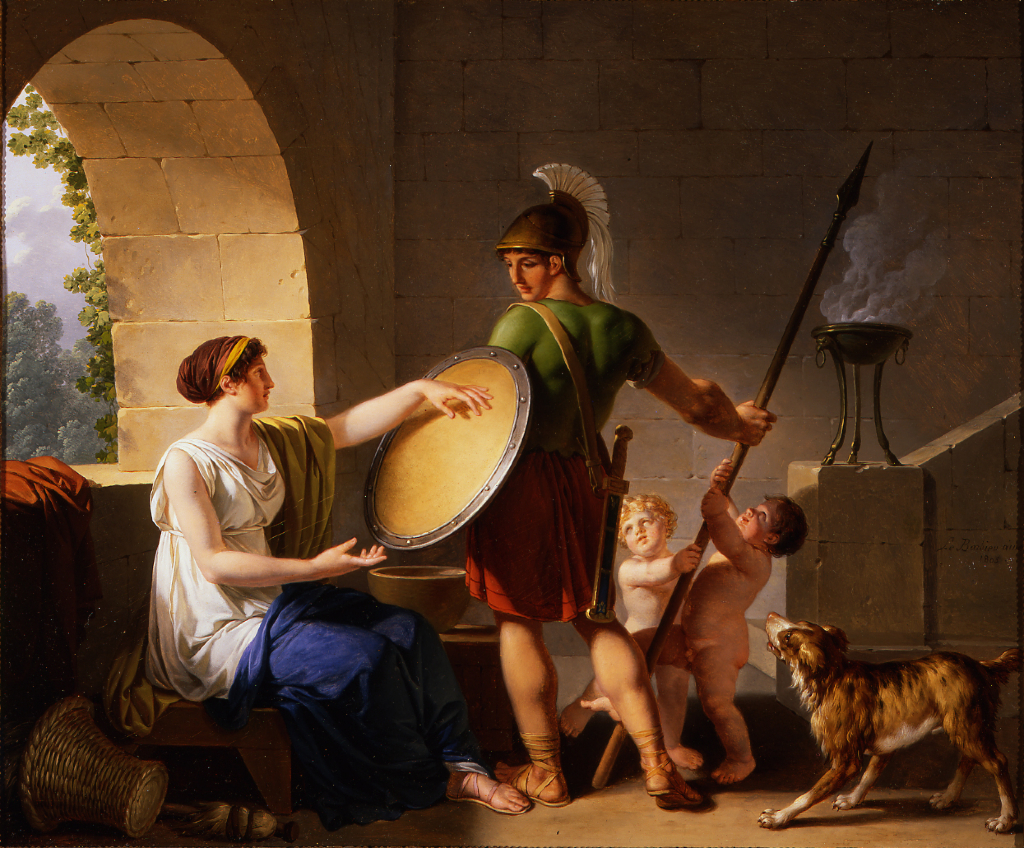
Spartan women enforced the state ideology of militarism and bravery. Plutarch relates that one woman, upon handing her son his shield, instructed him to come home "either with this, or on it".

Because Spartan men spent much of their time living in barracks or at war, Spartan women were expected to run the household themselves. Unlike in Athens, where state ideology held that men were in charge of the household, Sue Blundell argues that in Sparta it is likely that women's control of the domestic sphere was accepted by the state. Due to this Aristotle was critical of Sparta, and claimed Spartan men made a "mistake" giving their women rights, unlike in the rest of Greece. Aristotle also criticized Spartan women for their wealth. He attributed the state's precipitous fall from being the master of Greece to a second-rate power in less than 50 years, to the fact that Sparta had become a gynocracy whose women were intemperate and loved luxury.

All Spartan women, not just the richest, would have taken advantage of helot labour to perform the domestic tasks that elsewhere in Greece would have fallen to free women. Activities such as weaving, which were considered women's work elsewhere in Greece, were not considered fit for free women in Sparta. Therefore, women were more preoccupied with governance, agriculture, logistics and other sustenance tasks.

Spartan law codified under Lycurgus expressed the importance of child-bearing to Sparta. Bearing and raising children was considered the most important role for women in Spartan society; equal to male warriors in the Spartan army. Spartan women were encouraged to produce many children, preferably male, to increase Sparta's military population. They took pride in having borne and raised brave warriors. Having sons who were cowards, however, was a cause for sorrow, and the ancient author Aelian claims that women whose sons died as cowards lamented this. By contrast, the female relatives of the Spartans who died heroically in the Battle of Leuctra were said to have walked around in public looking happy.

Spartan women did not simply celebrate their sons who had shown bravery and mourn when they had not, but they were crucial in enforcing social consequences for cowardly men. When Pausanias, a traitor to Sparta, took refuge in a sanctuary to Athena, his mother Theano is said to have taken a brick and placed it in the doorway. Following this example, the Spartans bricked up the temple door with Pausanias inside. Similarly, three of Plutarch's Sayings of Spartan Women tell of Spartan mothers killing their cowardly sons themselves.

== Female homoeroticism ==
by limb-loosening desire.
She looks at me more meltingly
Than sleep or death;
She is sweet in no way ineffectually.
But Astymelosia does not answer me at all,
When she has the crown,
Just like a brilliant star falling through the sky
Or a golden bough or soft feather...
She advanced with striding feet...
The moist allure of Cinyras
Sits upon her maidenly hair...
Ah! If she should come closer and take
My tender hand, I would become hers.

— Alcman, as quoted by Sandra Boehringer

Alcman’s Partheneia or ‘maiden song’ was among the earliest documents discovered to express homoerotic sentiments between women. This was performed as choral hymns by young women in Sparta, and the piece was probably commissioned by the state to be performed publicly.

Alcman’s poem has a verse where the younger choral girls admire their older choral leaders who invoke admiration and also inspires these erotic sentiments. The women describe the way that eros for their choral leaders has taken over their bodies.

== Religion ==
In ancient Sparta, cults for women reflected Spartan society's emphasis on the women's roles as child-bearers and raisers. Consequently, cults focused on fertility, women's health, and beauty. The cult of Eileithyia, the goddess of childbirth, was an important cult for Spartan women. Also important was the cult of Helen, with many objects used by women – mirrors, eye-liners, combs, and perfume bottles, for instance – dedicated at her cult sites. As well as two major cult sites, a shrine to Helen was located in the center of Sparta, and many steles featuring her were carved and displayed throughout the city. Cynisca, the first woman to win an Olympic victory, also had a cult in Sparta, the "only woman on record" to have been thus commemorated.

Plutarch writes, in his Life of Lycurgus, that only men who died in battle and women who died while holding a religious office should have their name inscribed on their tombstone. This would be consistent with the Spartan reputation for piety, though one translation (Latte) emended the manuscript to read instead that women who died in childbirth would have named memorials, a reading which has become popular among many scholars. Matthew Dillon has argued that the tombstone inscriptions which Latte based this emendation on are not sufficient to support it.

== Clothing ==
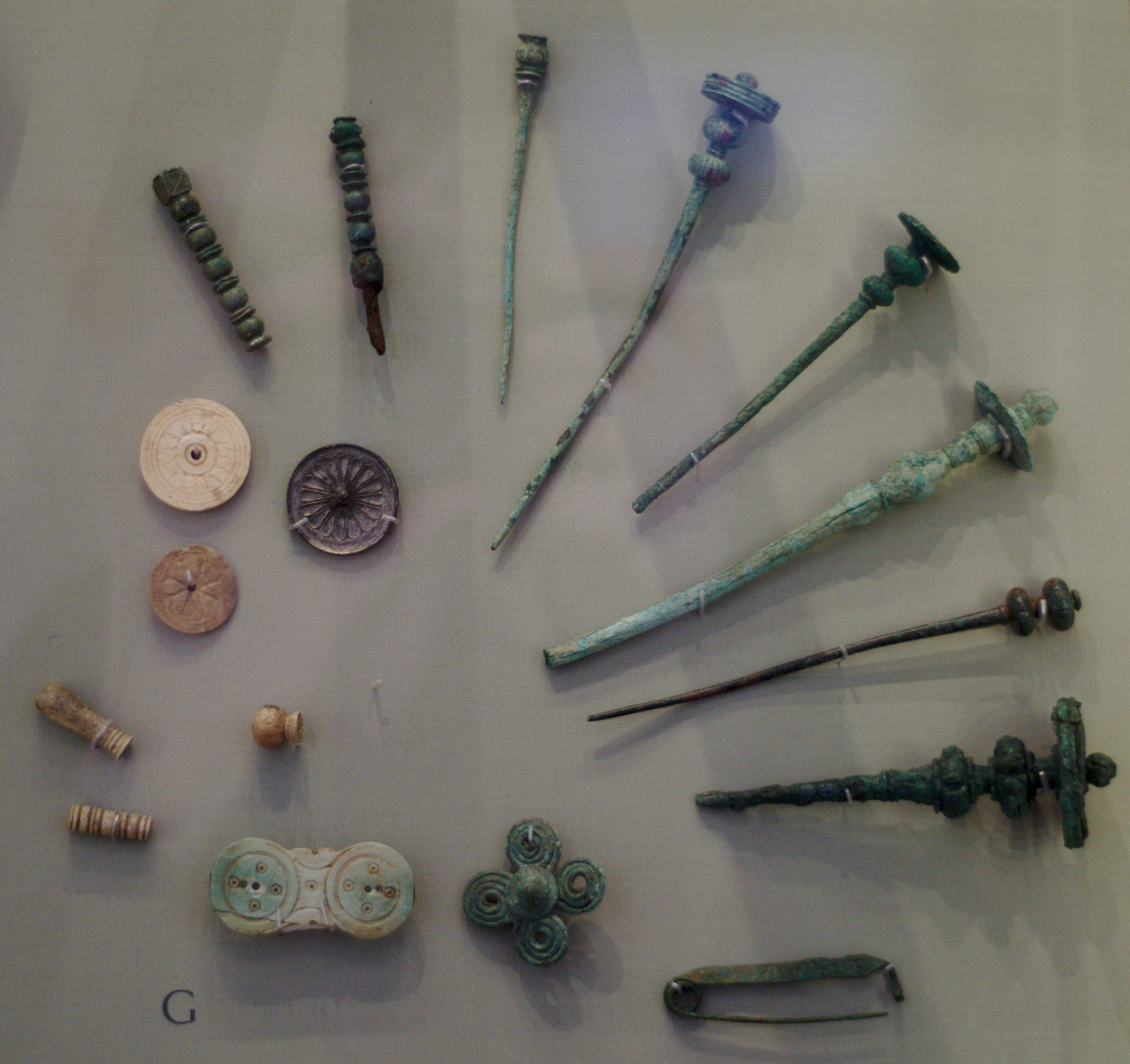
The Dorian peplos, worn by Spartan women, was fastened at the shoulder with pins called fibulae. These examples date to the archaic period and were discovered at the sanctuary of Artemis Orthia, one of Sparta's most important religious sites.

Spartan women's clothing was simple and notoriously short. They wore the Dorian peplos, with slit skirts which bared their thighs. The Dorian peplos was made of a heavier woolen material than was common in Ionia, and was fastened at the shoulder by pins called fibulae. When running races, Spartan girls wore a distinctive single-shouldered, knee-length chiton.

Since women did not weave their own clothes and instead left the creation of goods to the perioikoi; the purchase of elaborate cloth and metal bracelets was a sign of wealth. It is unknown whether women wore these silver and gold bracelets at all times or if only for religious ceremonies and festivals. Lycurgus was said to have forbidden women from using cosmetics.

Young women grew their hair long and did not cover it, but married women were not allowed to wear their hair long and covered their heads with veils.

== Non-Spartiate women ==
Similar to other places in ancient Greece, in Sparta far more is known about the elites than the lower classes, and ancient sources do not discuss gender in relation to the non-citizens who lived in Sparta. Various groups of free non-Spartiates lived in Sparta, as did helots and, at least later in Spartan history, personal slaves.

According to Xenophon, Spartan women were not required to do the domestic labour which women elsewhere in the Greek world were responsible for. He reports that in Sparta, doulai (slave women) did the weaving. In archaic Sparta it would have been helot women who fulfilled this role, but later in Spartan history, especially after the emancipation of the Messenian helots, many of these women were likely personal slaves. (Note: In early sources, doulos is used both for Spartan helots and for slaves as held elsewhere in the Greek world; later sources distinguish between helots, who were the property of the Spartan state, and douloi, who were owned by individuals.) Women in perioicic communities were presumably responsible for the domestic labour for their own household, just as women were elsewhere in the Greek world.

Plutarch says in his Life of Lycurgus that due to the lack of money in ancient Sparta, and because of the strict moral regime instituted by Lycurgus, there was no prostitution in Sparta. Later on, when gold and silver was more available, prostitution seemed to have surfaced. By the Hellenistic period, the geographer Polemon of Ilium reported that he had seen bronze statues in Sparta dedicated by the prostitute Cottina, and there was a brothel named for her near the temple of Dionysos.

Spartan nurses were famous throughout Greece, and wealthy families from across Greece had their children nursed by Spartans. Plutarch reports that Alcibiades was nursed by a Spartan woman called Amycla. The status of these nurses is not clear – they were probably not helots who would not have been sold to foreigners, but could have been some other form of non-citizen women from Laconia.

Unlike other slaves in ancient Greece, the helot population was maintained through reproduction rather than the purchase of more slaves. Because of this, helots were able to freely choose partners and live in family groups, whereas other Greek slaves were kept in single-sex dormitories. Along with relationships with helot men, some helot women seem to have had children with Spartan men. These children were called mothakes, and were apparently free and able to gain citizenship – according to Aelian, the admiral Lysander was a mothax. The main purpose of mothakes from a Spartan point of view was that they could fight in the Spartan army, and Sarah Pomeroy suggests that daughters of Spartan men and helot women would therefore have been killed at birth.

== See also ==
- Aristotle's views on women
- Archidamia: Spartan queen, famously organized the women of Sparta to defend the city against Pyrrhus of Epirus.
- Chilonis (daughter of Leotychidas)
- Chilonis (wife of Cleombrotus II)
- Euryleonis: Second woman to win an Olympic crown, for the two-horse chariot race.
- Women in Classical Athens

== Bibliography ==
- Blundell, Sue (1995), Women in Ancient Greece, Cambridge: Harvard University Press, ISBN 978-0-674-95473-1
- Boehringer, Sandra (2013), "Female Homoeroticism", A Companion to Greek and Roman Sexualities, John Wiley & Sons Ltd., pp. 155–156, doi:10.1002/9781118610657.ch9, ISBN 9781118610657
- Cartledge, Paul (1981), "Spartan Wives: Liberation or License?", The Classical Quarterly, 31 (1): 84–105, doi:10.1017/S0009838800021091, S2CID 170486308
- Cartledge, Paul (2013), The Spartans: an Epic History (New ed.), London: Pan Books, ISBN 978-1-447-23720-4
- Christensen, P. (2012), "Athletics and Social Order in Sparta in the Classical Period.", Classical Antiquity, 31 (2): 193–255, doi:10.1525/ca.2012.31.2.193, JSTOR 10.1525/ca.2012.31.2.193
- Dillon, Matthew (2007), "Were Spartan Women Who Died in Childbirth Honoured with Grave Inscriptions?", Hermes, 135 (2): 149–165, doi:10.25162/hermes-2007-0016, JSTOR 40379113, S2CID 170274193
- Ducat, Jean; Stafford, Emma; Shaw, Pamela-Jane (2006), Spartan Education: Youth and Society in the Classical Period, Swansea: Classical Press of Wales, ISBN 978-1-905125-07-4
- Fantham, Elaine; Foley, Helene Peet; Kampen, Natalie Boymel; Pomeroy, Sarah B.; Shapiro, H. Alan (1994), Women in the Classical World: Image and Text, New York: Oxford University Press, ISBN 9780195067279
- Hodkinson, Stephen (2000), Property and Wealth in Classical Sparta, London: David Brown Book Co., ISBN 9780715630402
- Hughes, Bettany (2005), Helen of Troy: Goddess, Princess, Whore, London: Pimlico, ISBN 978-1-844-13329-1
- Lerne, Gerda (1986), The Creation of Patriarchy, New York: Oxford University Press
- Millender, Ellen (2017), "Spartan Women", A Companion to Sparta, John Wiley & Sons Ltd., p. 504, doi:10.1002/9781119072379.ch19, ISBN 9781119072379
- Ogden, Daniel (2003), "Women and Bastardy in the Greek World", in Powell, Anton (ed.), The Greek World, London: Routledge, ISBN 0203042166
- Plutarch; Talbert, Richard (2005), Plutarch on Sparta, London: Penguin Books, ISBN 978-0140449433
- Pomeroy, Sarah B. (1994), Goddesses, Whores, Wives and Slaves: Women in Classical Antiquity, London: Pimlico, ISBN 978-0-712-66054-9
- Pomeroy, Sarah (2002), Spartan Women, Oxford: Oxford University Press, ISBN 978-0-195-13067-6
- Pomeroy, Sarah (2008), "Spartan Women Among the Romans: Adapting Models, Forging Identities", Memoirs of the American Academy in Rome. Supplementary Volumes, 7, JSTOR 40379356
- Powell, Anton (2004), "Sparta: A Modern Woman Imagines", The Classical Review, 54 (2): 465–467, doi:10.1093/cr/54.2.465
- Powell, Anton (2001), Athens and Sparta: Constructing Greek Political and Social History from 478 BC, London: Routledge, ISBN 978-0-415-26280-4
- Redfield, James (1978), "The Women of Sparta", The Classical Journal, 73 (2): 146–161, JSTOR 3296868
- Scott, Andrew G. (2011), "Plural Marriage and the Spartan State", Historia: Zeitschrift für Alte Geschichte, 60 (4): 413–424, doi:10.25162/historia-2011-0017, ISSN 0018-2311, JSTOR 41342859, S2CID 252457703
- Sealey, Raphael (1976), A History of the Greek City States, ca. 700–338 B.C., Berkeley: University of California Press, ISBN 978-0-520-03177-7
- Wiesner-Hanks, Merry E. (2011), Genders in History: Global Perspective (Second ed.), Wiley-Blackwell, p. 31, ISBN 978-1-4051-8995-8
