= Cynisca =

Spartan princess (born 442 BC)

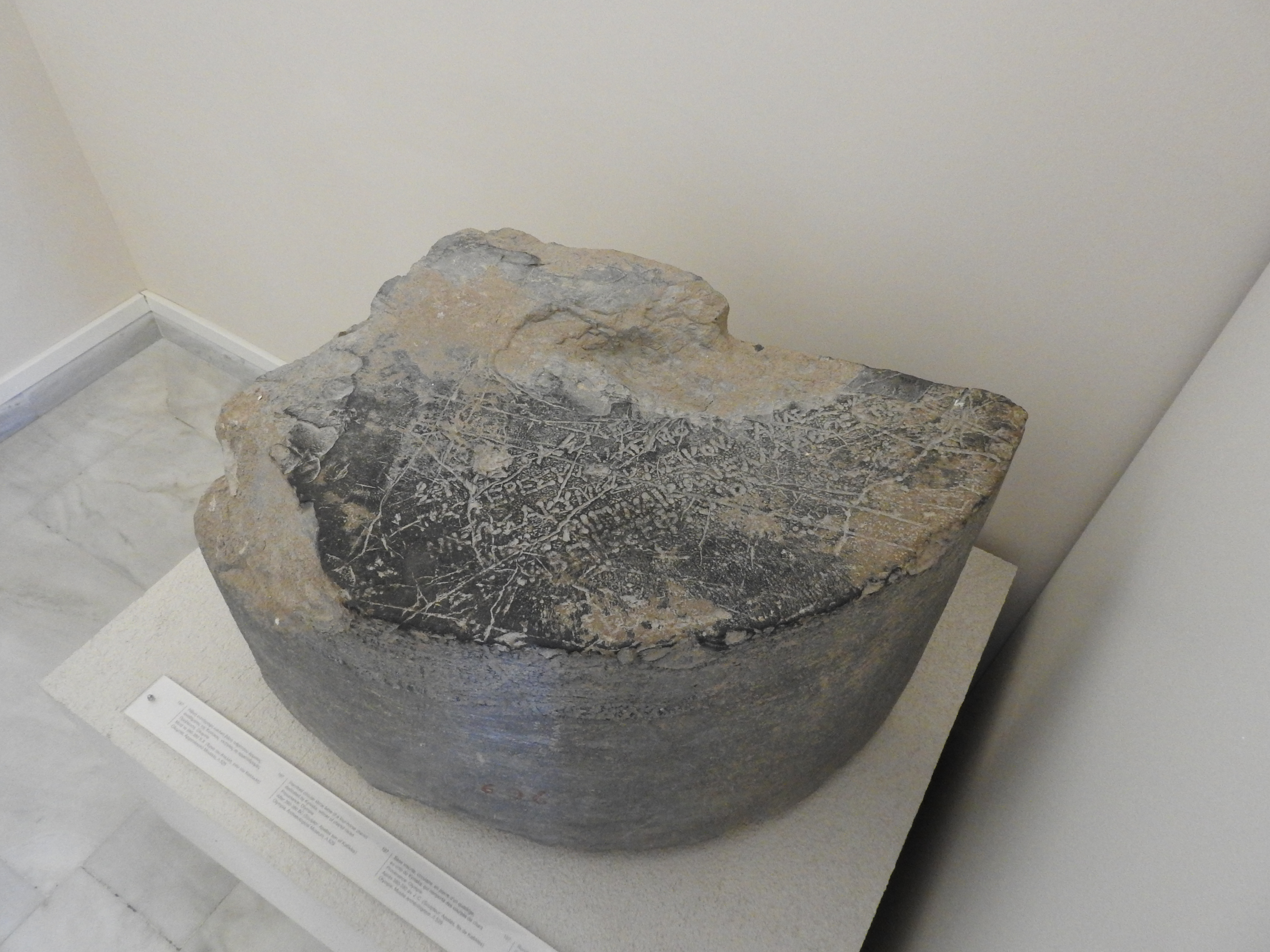
Statue base with an inscription in memory of Cynisca's 396 BC Olympic victory. Museum of the Olympic Games in Antiquity, Olympia

Cynisca (/sɪˈnɪskə/; or Kyniska, Greek: Κυνίσκα; born c. 440 BC) was a wealthy Spartan princess. She is famous for being the first woman to win at the Olympic Games. Cynisca first entered the Olympics in 396 BC, where she won first prize competing with a team of horses she had trained herself. In 392 BC, Cynisca entered her horses in the Olympics for a second time and was awarded another victory in the same event.

== Name ==
The name Cynisca means 'female puppy' or 'little hound' in Ancient Greek. She was named after her grandfather Zeuxidamus, who was also called Cyniscos. Sarah B. Pomeroy suggest that this unusual name could have been a nickname for a tomboyish woman and it alludes to an interest in hunting. It is possible that the name is derived from the hunting traditions of the Spartan elite. Per Cartledge, it could have been a tribute to a species of a Spartan hound that was renowned as scenter during hunting. Pomeroy notes that the names of her close female relatives point to equestrian interests in their lineage.

== Early life ==
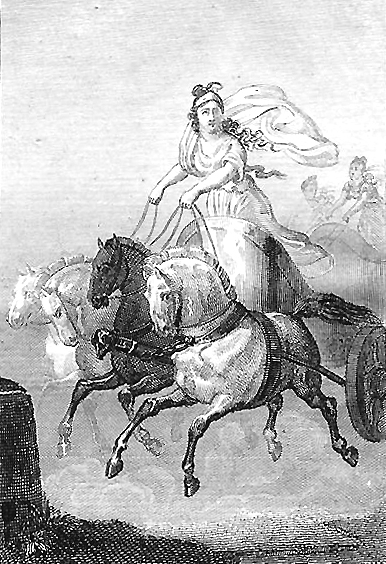
Illustration for Sophie de Renneville, Biographie des femmes illustres de Rome, de la Grèce, et du Bas-Empire (Paris, 1825)

Cynisca was born in the ancient Greek city-state of Sparta probably around 440 BC. A member of the Eurypontid dynasty, she was the daughter of King Archidamus II and his wife Eupolia. She was probably half-sister to Agis II (r. 427–400 BC) and full sister to Agesilaus II (r. 400–360 BC), both of whom succeeded their father as a kings of Sparta. She had a sister named Proauga. In her childhood, Cynisca may have earned some experience in sporting from Sparta's female physical education curriculum (equivalent to boys' agoge), which she presumably attended. Coming from a wealthy family, she could own racehorses. According to Pausanias, Cynisca was the first woman to breed horses and was exceedingly ambitious to succeed at the Olympic Games.

Several sources from Xenophon and Plutarch mention how Agesilaus encouraged her to breed horses and compete in the games during her youth. However, his motivations for doing so have recently been debated. According to these ancient sources, Agesilaus supposedly viewed success in chariot racing as a victory without merit. Unlike other events, where a man's bravery and virtue were the decisive factors, he believed that chariot racing merely demonstrated wealth, as it required no direct involvement from the horses' owner. Both of these ancient authors suggested that Agesilaus hoped to expose how the sport was unmanly and aristocratic by having a woman win. Though in reality, Cynisca's victories did not stop wealthy Spartans from engaging in the sport. Several modern scholars, on the other hand, have theorized that Agesilaus' motivations were more practical. They suspect that he was using her victories and wealth to promote his own political career and gain public support through association, rather than providing a moral lesson. The evidence provided to support this theory is that Cynisca's two Olympic victories would have also brought fame to Agesilaus and to the wider Eurypontid house. Additionally, the establishment of Cynisca's hero-cult after her death could suggest that Agesilaus was still making use of his sister's fame even after her death.

== Olympic Games ==
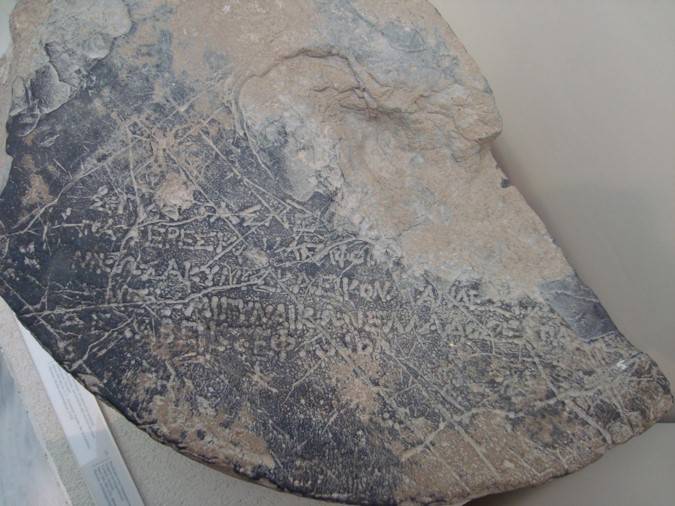
Statue base dedicated by Cynisca, with the inscription commemorating her Olympic victoriy.

In 396 BC, Cynisca employed charioteers to drive the horses she trained and entered her team at the Olympics for the first time, where it won in the four-horse chariot race (tethrippon Greek: τέθριππον). Cynisca is thought to have been approximately 40 years old when she won her first Olympic victory. In 392 BC, Cynisca again entered her racing team at the Olympic games and secured another victory.

To commemorate her Olympic achievements, Cynisca dedicated a set of bronze statues which depicted herself, her charioteer, her chariot, and her horses at the Temple of Zeus in Olympia. According to Pausanias, these statues were placed in a prominent location in the entrance way of the temple, next to the throne dedicated by Arimnestus, a king of Etruria. Along with the statues, Cynisca also celebrated her victories with an inscription, declaring that she was the only woman to win the wreath in the chariot events at the Olympic Games. Cynisca also dedicated another monument with copy of the same inscription in Sparta. The inscription from Olympia (c. 390-380 BC) reads:

English
Kings of Sparta are my father and brothers
I, Kyniska, victorious with a chariot of swift-footed horses,
have erected this statue. I declare myself the only woman
in all Hellas to have won this crown.
Apelleas son of Kallikles made it.

Ancient Greek

Σπάρτας μὲν βασιλῆες ἐμοὶ :πατέρες καὶ ἀδελφοί, ἅρματι δ’ ὠκυπόδων ἵππων :νικῶσα Κυνίσκα εἰκόνα τάνδ’ ἔστασεν μόναν :δ’ ἐμέ φαμι γυναικῶν Ἑλλάδος ἐκ πάσας τόν[-] :δε λαβεν στέφανον. Ἀπελλέας Καλλικλέος ἐπόησε.

Pausanias also mentions an epigram to Cynisca of unknown authorship, which he claims was the only poetic composition ever written to commemorate the deeds of the royal houses of the Lacedaemonians. In addition to this, a heroön (hero-shrine) was erected for Cynisca in Sparta at Plane-tree Grove, where religious ceremonies were held. Previously, only Spartan kings had been graced in this way; Cynisca was the first woman to receive this honor.

== Cultural context ==
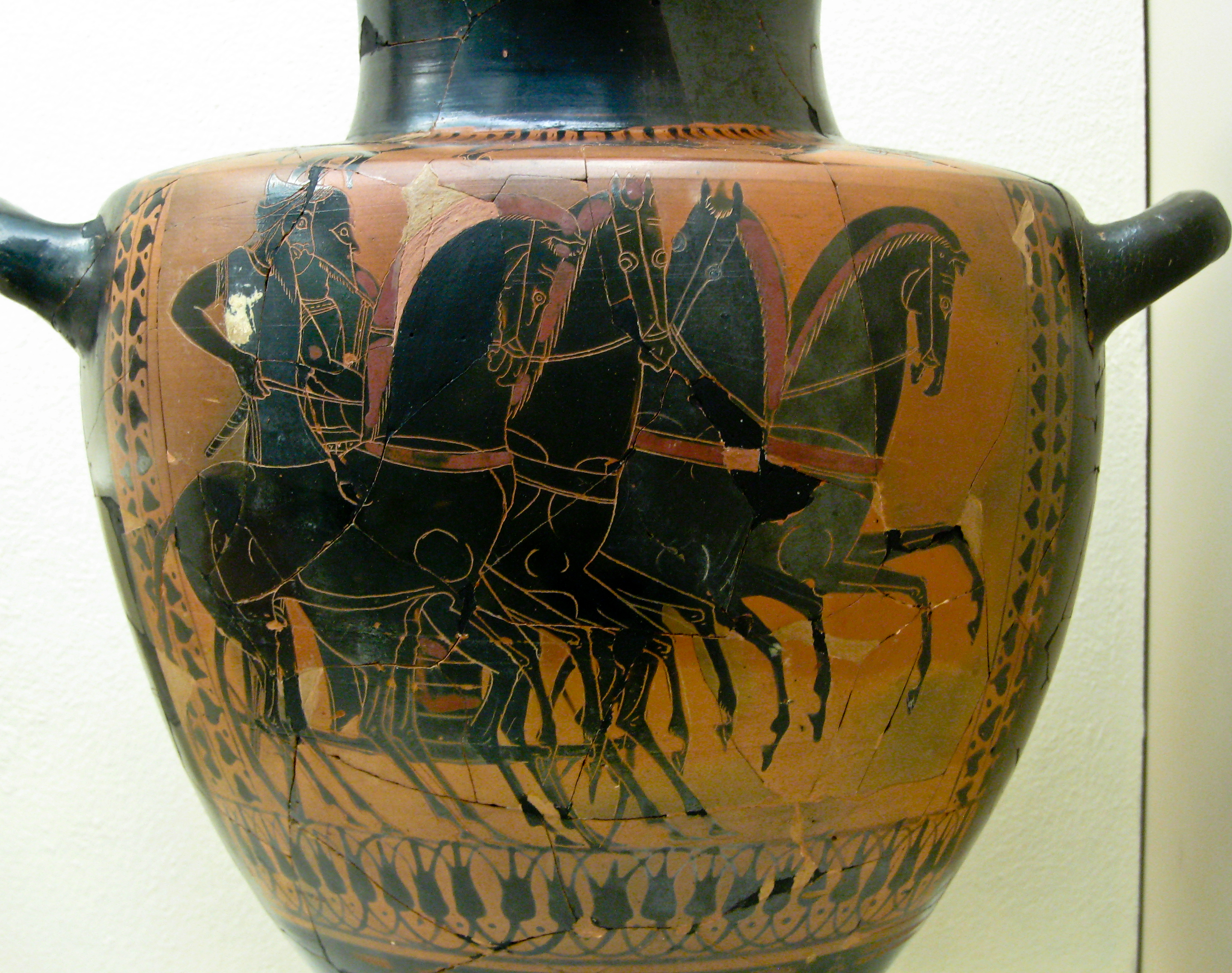
A depiction of an ancient Greek four-horse chariot, c. 530-520 BC

While most women in the ancient Greek world were kept in seclusion and forbidden to pursue athletic activities such as riding or hunting, Spartan women of the elite spartiate class (Note: Though full citizenry, i.e. spartiate class, was restricted to men, 'spartiate' is used here as shorthand for elite women of adjacent status.) were trained to excel in sports. The greater freedom that spartiate women experienced in terms of athletic pursuits was largely due to the fact that they were able to dedicate significant amounts of time to their training, since the helot system, whereby the majority of the population was kept in slavery, relieved them of the typical household duties that most other Greek women were expected to attend to. High levels of female athleticism were encouraged in Sparta because as a society, they believed that strong women would produce strong children and supply the army with powerful soldiers.

Despite the greater level of social freedom that spartiate women enjoyed, participation in Olympic Games remained almost entirely restricted to men. There is debate about whether women were even allowed to attend the games as spectators. Several passages from Pausanias shed light on this issue, as he suggests that parthenai (young, unmarried women) were allowed to attend the Olympics as spectators, but gynaikes (married women) were barred from entering. In terms of competing in the Olympic games, women were only allowed to enter the equestrian events, not by participating themselves, but rather by owning and training the horses.

However, while it was rare for women to compete against men in athletic games, as Cynisca did, there is evidence to suggest that separate athletic competitions existed for women in the Greek world. The existence of these competitions is supported by Pausanias' mention of a number of bronze statues dedicated by victorious female runners (mostly Spartan) at the temple of Hera at Elis, as well as several stone inscriptions that have been uncovered.

== Cynisca's cultural impact ==
Based on archaeological evidence such as the locations of her dedications and hero-cult, as well as the speculation of modern scholars, Cynisca's win at the Olympics likely had a great impact on women across the Greek world, not only her fellow Lacedaemonians. After Cynisca's victory, several other Greek women went on to achieve varying levels of success in the sport of chariot racing, including Euryleonis, Belistiche, Zeuxo, Encrateia and Hermione, Timareta, Theodota, and Cassia. However, according to Pausanias, none of these women gained greater recognition for their victories than Cynisca. When Berenike of Egypt won in the four-horse chariot race at the Olympics in the early third century BC, she commissioned an epigram by the poet Posidippus in which she explicitly claimed to have "stolen" the fame (κῦδος) of Cynisca. Her epigram was included in the so-called Greek Anthology, which also indicates its continuing relevance long after the victory itself. Some scholars have suggested that Cynisca's Olympic victories and heroic qualities were likely also honored by men, based on the fact that her heroön was placed in a prominent location near the Platanistas, the exercise grounds for Spartan youths.

In modern times, Cynisca has been commemorated by the Greek poet Zoe Karelli, who wrote a poem about her love for horses and the Olympic victory which made her name famous in Greek history. Cynisca is included in Judy Chicago's 1979 feminist art exhibit commemorating historically famous women throughout civilization, The Dinner Party. In sports of the modern era, Cynisca continues to be recognized. Cynisca Cycling is a U.S. registered women's professional cycling team named after the Spartan princess. Kyniska Advocacy is a UK organization fostering a safe environment for women in sports. Kyniska Hoops is an AAU girls' basketball club, also playing in the girls' U.S. Junior National basketball tournament.

== See also ==
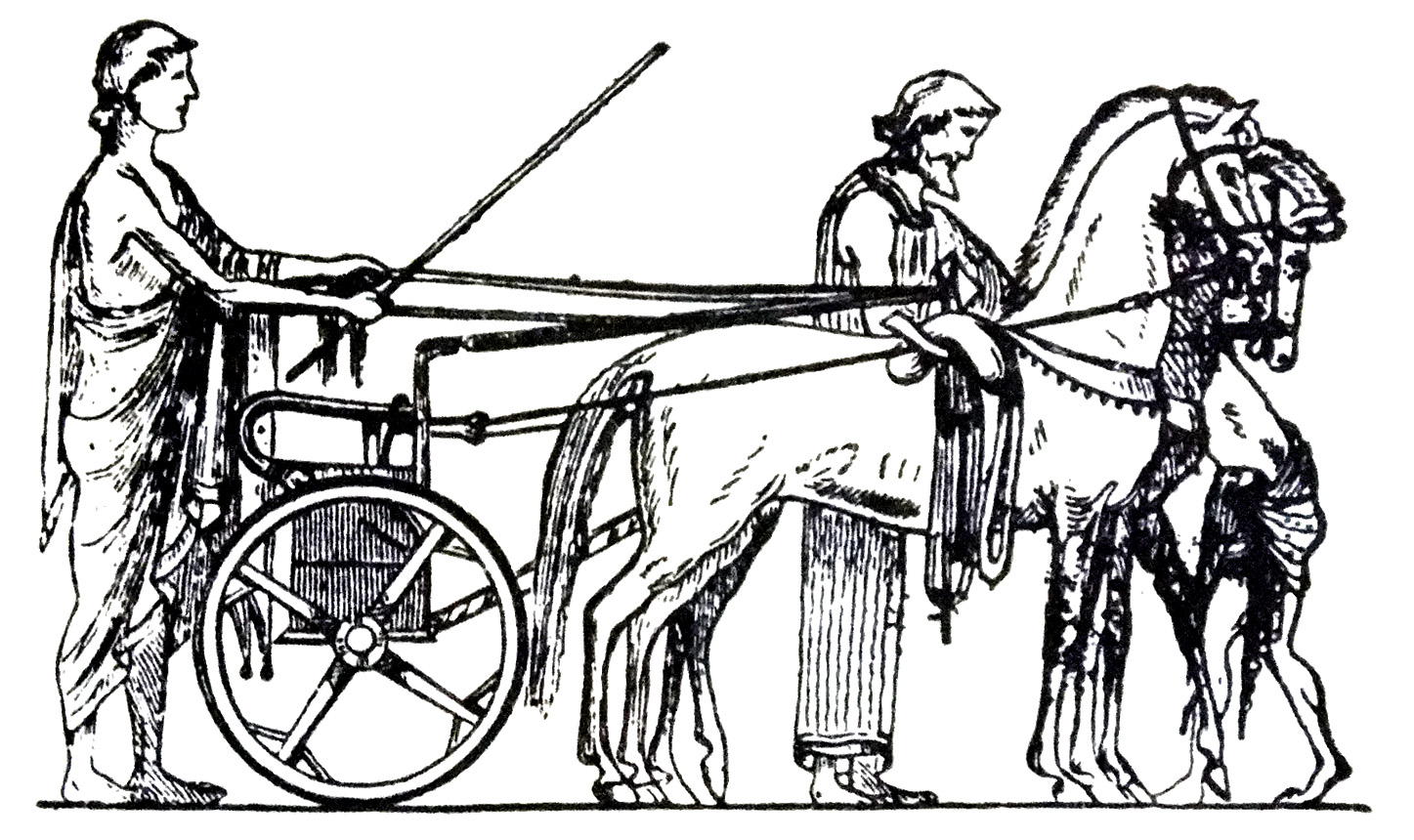
A two-horse ancient Greek racing chariot, the kind used by Euryleonis.

- Euryleonis – another celebrated Spartan woman who won the two horse chariot races in 368 BC.
- List of ancient Olympic victors

== Bibliography ==
- Cartledge, Paul (2013). The Spartans, An Epic History. Pan Books. ISBN 9781447237204.
- Stephen Hodkinson, Property and Wealth in Classical Sparta, The Classical Press of Wales, 2000. ISBN 0-7156-3040-7
- Kyle, Donald (2003). "The Only Woman in All Greece": Kyniska, Agesilaus, Alcibiades and Olympia". Journal of Sport History. 30. University of Illinois Press: 183–203.
- Pomeroy, Sarah B. (2002). Spartan Women. Oxford University Press. ISBN 9780198030003.
- G. P. Schauss and S. R. Wenn (eds). Onward to the Olympics: Historical Perspectives on the Olympic Games (Waterloo, Ont., Canada: Wilfrid Laurier University Press, 2007).
- Melanie Meaker, "Women at the Races: Female Victors at Greek hippikoi agones", in: C. Frank, G. Gilles, C. Plastow, L. Webb (eds.), Female Agency in the Ancient Mediterranean, Liverpool 2024: 49–82.
