= Goddesses, Whores, Wives, and Slaves =

1975 feminist history book by Sarah Pomeroy

Goddesses, Whores, Wives, and Slaves: Women in Classical Antiquity
- First edition
- Author: Sarah B. Pomeroy
- Language: English
- Subject: Women's history, feminist history, classical antiquity
- Published: 1975 (Schocken Books)
- Publication place: United States

Goddesses, Whores, Wives, and Slaves: Women in Classical Antiquity is a 1975 feminist history book by Sarah B. Pomeroy. The work covers the lives of women in antiquity from the Greek Dark Ages to the death of Constantine the Great. The book was one of the first English works on women's history in any period. It has been used as a textbook in many university-level courses on women in classical antiquity.

== Reception ==
When the book was first published, reviewers commented that Pomeroy's work was an improvement on previous treatments of women in classical antiquity, such as J. P. V. D. Balsdon's Roman Women, and it was praised for its lack of "polemical bias". Marylin Arthur thought that Goddesses, Whores, Wives, and Slaves was "important", and particularly praised the chapter on women in the Hellenistic period as "the high point of her book". However, Daphne Nash criticised Pomeroy's work for its "poor level of historical argumentation" and for Pomeroy refusing to give her own opinion on disputed points. She concluded that Goddesses, Whores, Wives, and Slaves ultimately "failed to transcend the limitations of its predecessors".

Goddesses, Whores, Wives, and Slaves is now considered to be a turning point in the study of women in ancient history. In 1994, Edith Hall said that it "marked the inauguration of women's studies within classics"; in the same year, Shelley Haley wrote that it "legitimized the study of Greek and Roman women in ancient times". Lin Foxhall, writing about the historiography of gender in classical antiquity, has described Pomeroy's book as "revolutionary", and "a major step forward" compared to existing scholarship on women in the ancient world.

== See also ==
- Women in ancient Rome
- Women in ancient Sparta
- Women in Classical Athens
