= Gadenne =

Gadenne is a surname. Notable people with the surname include:

- Alfred Gadenne (1946–2017), Belgian politician
- Paul Gadenne (1907–1956), French novelist
