= Villerupt =

- Commune
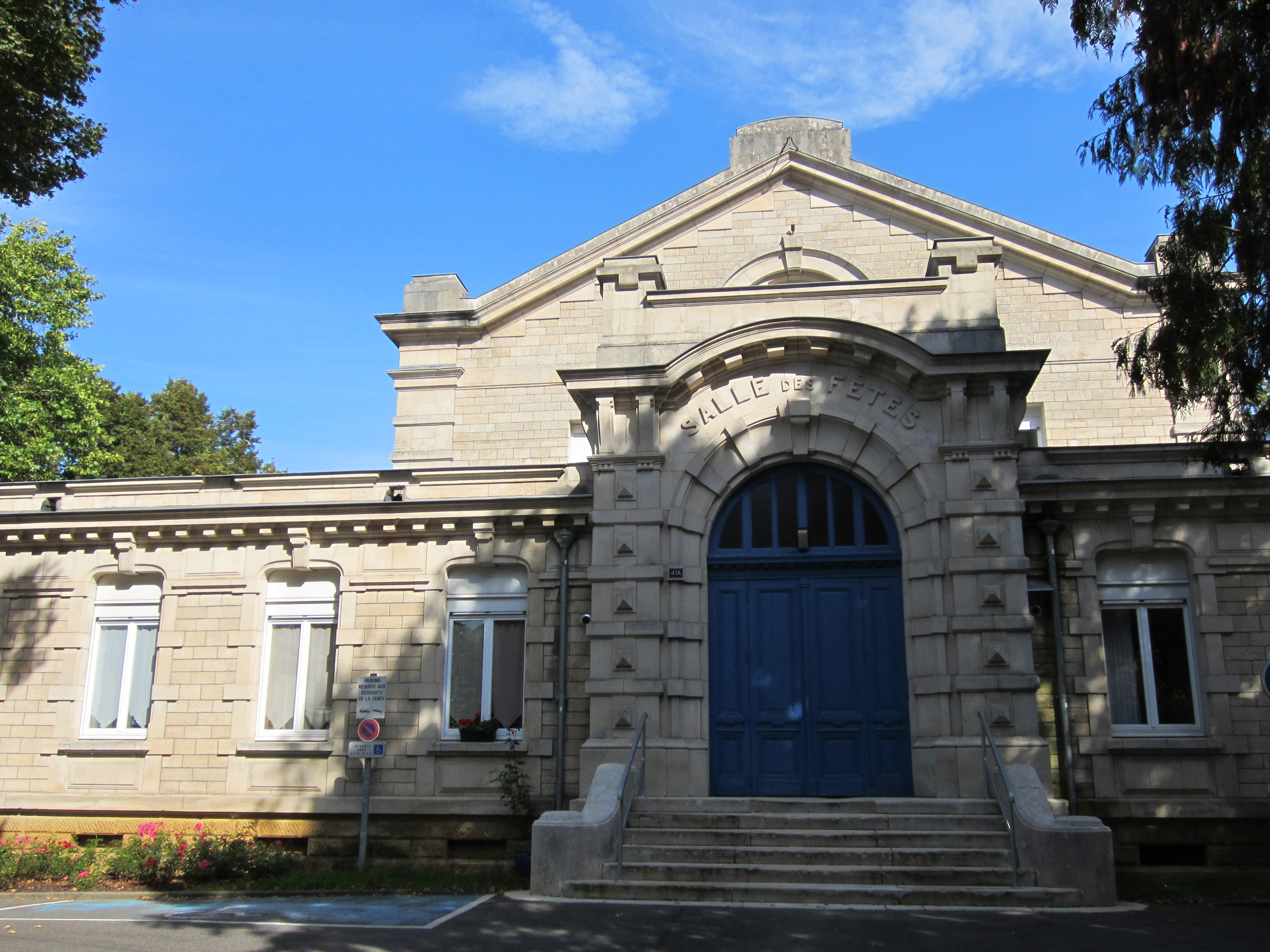
- The old festival hall in Villerupt

- Coat of arms
- Location of Villerupt
- Location within France Location within Grand Est
- Coordinates: 49°28′11″N 5°55′43″E
- Country: France
- Region: Grand Est
- Department: Meurthe-et-Moselle
- Arrondissement: Val-de-Briey
- Canton: Villerupt
- Intercommunality: Pays Haut Val d'Alzette

Government
  - Mayor (2021–2026): Pierrick Spizak
- Area^{1}: 6.56 km^{2} (2.53 sq mi)
- Elevation: 380 m (1,250 ft)
- Highest elevation: 442 m (1,450 ft)
- Lowest elevation: 309 m (1,014 ft)
- Population (2023): 10,102
  - Density: 1,540/km^{2} (3,990/sq mi)
- Time zone: UTC+01:00 (CET)
  - Summer (DST): UTC+02:00 (CEST)
- INSEE/Postal code: 54580 /54190
- Website: www.mairie-villerupt.fr
- ^{1} French Land Register data, which excludes lakes, ponds, glaciers > 1 km^{2} (0.386 sq mi or 247 acres) and river estuaries.

Villerupt (pronounced [vilʁy]; Luxembourgish: Weller [ˈvælɐ]) is a commune in the Meurthe-et-Moselle department in the Grand Est region in Northeastern France. It is located on the departmental border with Moselle, not far from the France–Luxembourg border.

A festival takes place in the commune each year in October–November.

== Demographics ==
Historical population
Year	Pop.	±% p.a.
1968	14,797	—
1975	13,401	−1.41%
1982	11,465	−2.20%
1990	10,070	−1.61%
1999	9,686	−0.43%
2007	9,580	−0.14%
2012	9,354	−0.48%
2017	9,737	+0.81%
2023	10,102	+0.62%
Source: INSEE

== Notable people from Villerupt ==
- Katia Astafieff (born 1975), travel writer, novelist and children's author
- Aurélie Filippetti (born 1973), politician and novelist
- Olivier Jacque (born 1973), former professional Grand Prix motorcycle road racer

== See also ==
- Communes of the Meurthe-et-Moselle department
