= Euryleonis =

4th-century BC Spartan horse breeder

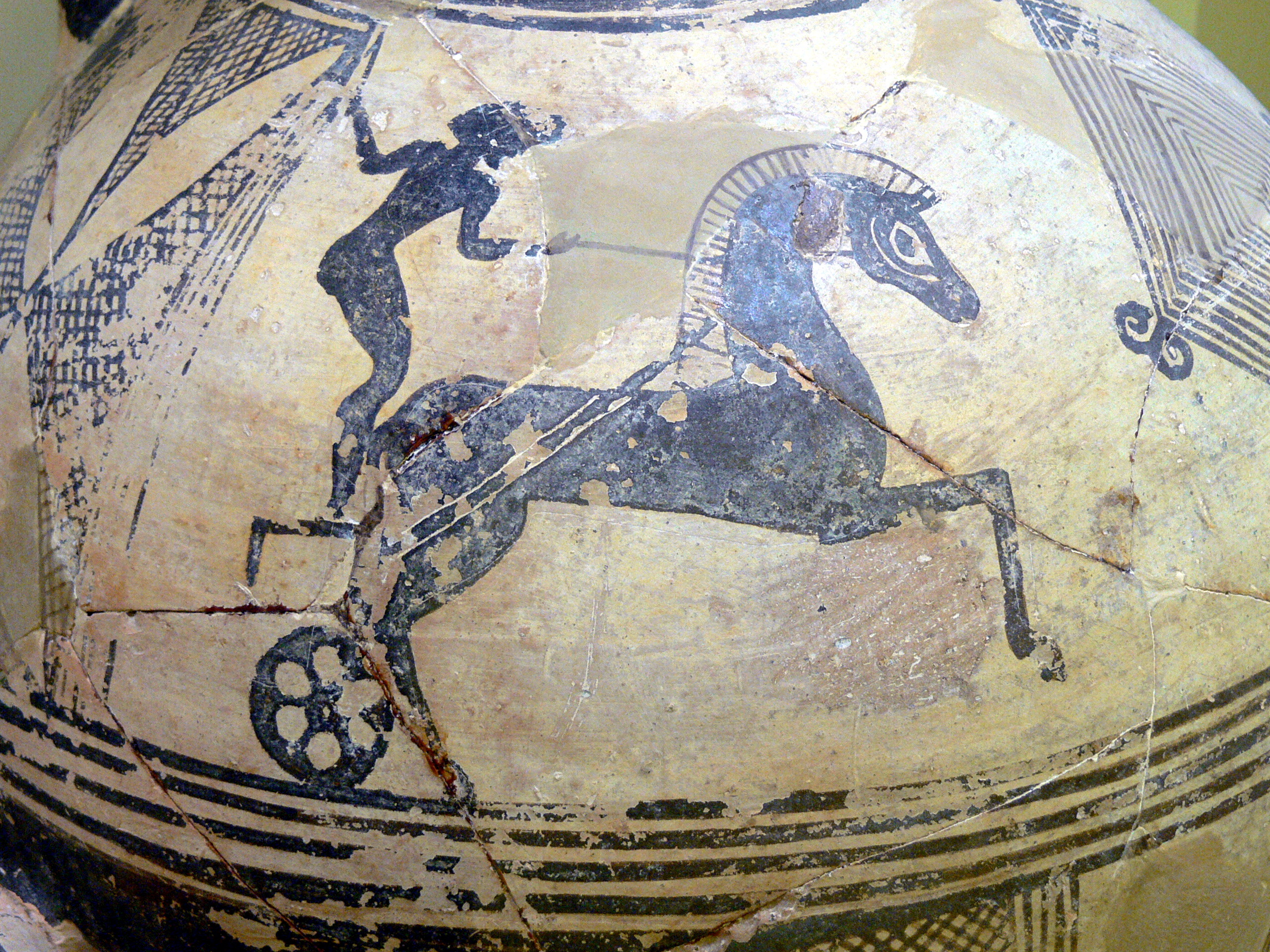
Representation of a chariot race on a clay hydria.

Euryleonis (Ancient Greek: Ευρυλεωνίς) was a woman honored with a statue in Sparta as the owner of a victorious pair of horses in the chariot races at the Ancient Olympic Games probably in 368 BC.

Euryleonis would have been a wealthy aristocrat. She was the second female stephanite (crowned victor) in the long history of the ancient Olympics. The Spartan princess Kyniska, won the four-horse race in 396 BCE and again in 392 BCE, the first ever woman to win at the Olympics. Women were barred from attending the Ancient Olympic games, but could own horses that competed. The owner of the winning team of horses, not the rider, won recognition as the Olympic victor.

== Statue ==
Her existence is known only from one sentence in the Greek travel writer Pausanias (flourished 143–176 CE). He saw a statue of a woman said by the Spartans to be of Euryleonis standing next to the Skenoma on the acropolis of Sparta.

The statue does not survive, nor has its base been found, but it was presumably cast in bronze. No personal statues of athletic or military victors in Sparta are attested before the statue of Euryleonis.

== Bibliography ==
- Warren, Patricia Nell (2009-09-03). "Women's History Month: Filling In the Blanks". The Bilerico Project for iPhone. Archived from the original on 2011-07-18.
- Pomeroy, Sarah B. (2002). Spartan Women. Oxford University Press. ISBN 0-19-513067-7.
