= Apellas =

Apellas (Ancient Greek: Ἀπελλᾶς) was a sculptor of ancient Greece who made, in bronze, statues of worshipping women (ad orantes feminas). He made the statue of Cynisca, who conquered in the chariot race at Olympia. Cynisca was sister to Agesilaus II, king of Sparta, who died at the age of 84, in 362 BCE. Therefore, the victory of Cynisca, and the time when Apellas flourished, may be placed about 400. His name indicates his Doric origin.

His father Callicles and his grandfather Theocosmus were also sculptors.

The writer Diogenes Laërtius mentions a different man with this name, a sceptic philosopher with the name Apellas, about whom nothing else is known.
