= Verb Wellington =

- Formation: 2014; 12 years ago
- Headquarters: Wellington, New Zealand
- Director: Claire Mabey
- Website: https://www.verbwellington.nz/

Verb Wellington is an organisation that since 2014 has run an annual literary festival in Wellington, New Zealand called Verb Writers and Readers Festival. It was founded by Claire Mabey. Part of the festival is an event called LitCrawl which is like a pub crawl, across many venues (20 in 2022, 25 in 2026). In addition to the festival, Verb Wellington run other events; for example, it partnered with the British Council in 2023 to bring together Chris Tse (the New Zealand Poet Laureate) and Simon Armitage (the United Kingdom Poet Laureate) at an event called Does Literature Matter? at the National Library of New Zealand.

== Background ==
Andrew Laking and Claire Mabey created the first Verb Wellington event in 2014. Laking's background was as a musician and Mabey had been at the Tauranga Arts Festival and has a diploma in publishing from Whitireia Polytechnic. Mabey brought forward the concept of LitCrawl which grew into the bigger festival. Verb Wellington works in partnership with the New Zealand Arts Festival every two years to deliver their literary festival programme. Verb Wellington's festival and events were disrupted in 2020, like many, by COVID-19.

Wellington Treasure Trust is a registered charity that supports Verb Wellington. Board members in 2023 were Emma Marr, Catherine Robertson, Branavan Gnanalingam, Andrew Laking and Claire Mabey.

I think Wellington is a leading literary city, globally. When you look at the history of book production and writing here, it’s amazing. Patricia Grace, Bill Manhire, Elizabeth Knox. (Claire Mabey 2020)

In 2023 the festival programmers are Rangimarie Sophie Jolley, Trinity Thompson-Browne, Damien Levi, Rosabel Tan and Chris Tse. Melanie Hamilton is the executive director. Claire Mabey has left to pursue writing.

== Verb Writers and Readers Festival ==
LitCrawl was the start of the annual festivals. The format is a number of short events for example in 2019 there were free events in three time slots, 6pm – 6.45pm, 7.15pm – 8pm, 8.30pm – 9.15pm with time to move between venues. LitCrawl in 2014 included The Bat Show at Arty Bees bookshop with Abby Howells and Daniel Pengelly, Writing Tunes and Playing Poetry at a music shop (Alistair's Music) on Cuba Street with Ebony Lamb and Nick Bollinger and Little Beasties with writer from the Modern Institute of Letters including Damien Wilkins, Helen Heath, and Chris Price.

The programme in 2015 featured Jacinda Ardern in the event Women of Letters.

In 2017 the Women of Letters event included Georgina Beyer, Gaylene Preston and Ashleigh Young. Also in 2017 were Joy Cowley, Witi Ihimaera, Emily Perkins and Hēmi Kelly, it was the biggest LitCrawl so far with 25 events.

The 2018 LitCrawl was the first one to utilise guest curators for the programming. One event organised by writing group Crip the Lit attended by 200 people was a debate with Mandy Hager, Paula Tesoriero and Henrietta Bollinger on the negative and Trish Harris, Steff Green and Alisha Tyson on the affirmative. They were debating “There’s no such thing as a disabled writer. We are all just writers.”

In 2019 the festival featured a family programme with a KidsCrawl at Porirua Library and a session at Polhill Reserve with author Robert Vennell, Paul Ward and expert Arihia Latham. Of the 2019 programme writer Nina Mingya Powles described a panel that included three writers of Chinese heritage (poets Gregory Kan and Chen Chen and founding editor of The Pantograph Punch, Rosabel Tan) as a significant event, 'solidifying a growing feeling that there is indeed a small but strong community of New Zealand Chinese writers'.

In 2021 an event was A Clear Dawn: New Asian Voices from Aotearoa New Zealand with writers Rupa Maitra, Mikee Sto Domingo, Rose Lu and Chris Tse.

The 2022 festival had a theme called Radical Possibility. Rijula Das was a festival programmer. Featured writers included Hinemoa Elder, Coco Solid, Albert Cho, Vincent O’Sullivan and Gaylene Preston. Also Jenny Pattrick and Fiona Kidman.

The 2025 festival was cancelled due to a reduction in funding from Creative New Zealand.

== Residencies ==
Verb Wellington have a number of writers residencies including a three-week paid writing time with Katherine Mansfield House & Garden that started in 2020. The inaugural resident of this programme was Himali McInnes, then Iona Winter (2021), Himali McInnes again in 2022 and Jack Remiel Cottrell in 2023. The patron is John Ormiston in memory of his wife, Diana (Dinny) Lennon who died in 2018.
