= Randell Cottage Writers' Residency =

New Zealand literary residency

Coordinates: 41°16′42.9″S 174°46′6.2″E

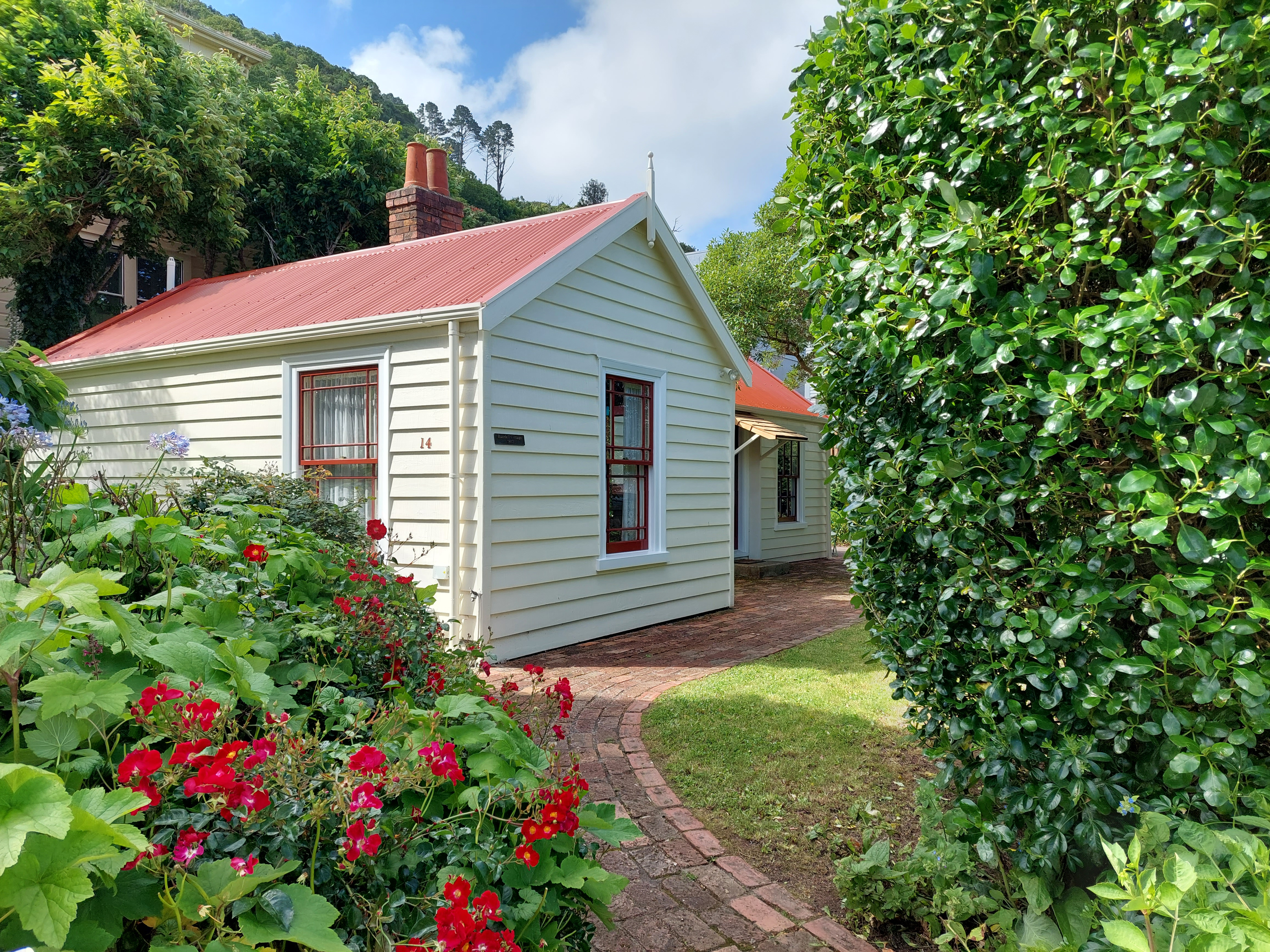
- Randell Cottage, 2021
- Awarded for: Writing
- Location: Thorndon, Wellington
- Country: New Zealand
- Presented by: Randell Cottage Writers' Trust
- Rewards: Rent-free accommodation and stipend
- First award: 2002; 24 years ago
- Website: www.randellcottage.co.nz

The Randell Cottage Writers' Residency is a literary residency in New Zealand. It is awarded annually to one New Zealand writer and one French writer, comprising six months' rent-free accommodation at Randell Cottage in Wellington and a stipend (as of 2025 set at NZ$32,000). The recipients are usually mid-career writers. The cottage itself is listed with Heritage New Zealand.

== History ==
The residency is based at Randell Cottage in the suburb of Thorndon, Wellington. The cottage was built in 1868 by William Randell, the great-grandfather of children's author Beverley Randell. He and his wife Sarah raised their 10 children at the cottage. After seventy years of the cottage being owned by other families, Beverley and her husband, Hugh Price, bought the cottage in 1994 and restored it to how it had been at the time of William's ownership.

In 2002, on the suggestion of her daughter Susan Price, Beverley Randell decided to gift the cottage to a trust for the purpose of setting up a writers' residency. The plan was partly inspired by an attempt to set up a similar residency in memory of the poet Lauris Edmond, which had been unsuccessful. It was the first dedicated writers' residency in Wellington. In part, the residency reciprocates the Katherine Mansfield Menton Fellowship, which provides a residency based in France for New Zealand writers. The trust has been supported by Creative New Zealand, the New Zealand–France Friendship Fund and the Wellington City Council. Founding trustees included Fiona Kidman and Vincent O'Sullivan.

Kirsty Gunn, 2009 writer-in-residence, described the cottage:

From the moment I stepped inside the door at Randell Cottage, 14 St Mary St, Wellington, I felt like I was coming home. Everything about the place was familiar — from the New Zealand timber floorboards to the very positioning of the sash windows that looked out to a garden of native trees and hydrangeas. I had spent Wairarapa holidays in cottages like this, with a coal range in the kitchen and a lean-to pantry with a tin roof that gave off to one side. Even the kinds of prints on the wall, the blue-and-white china in the pantry, were familiar.

Caroline Laurent, the 2021 French recipient, was unable to take up the residency during the year due to COVID-19 border restrictions. She eventually was able to take up her residency in December 2022.

In late 2024 it was reported that the fellowship was experiencing funding difficulties after Creative New Zealand declined its funding application for the next three years. The trust sought crowd-funding to enable a 2025 residency.

=== Heritage registration ===
Randell Cottage
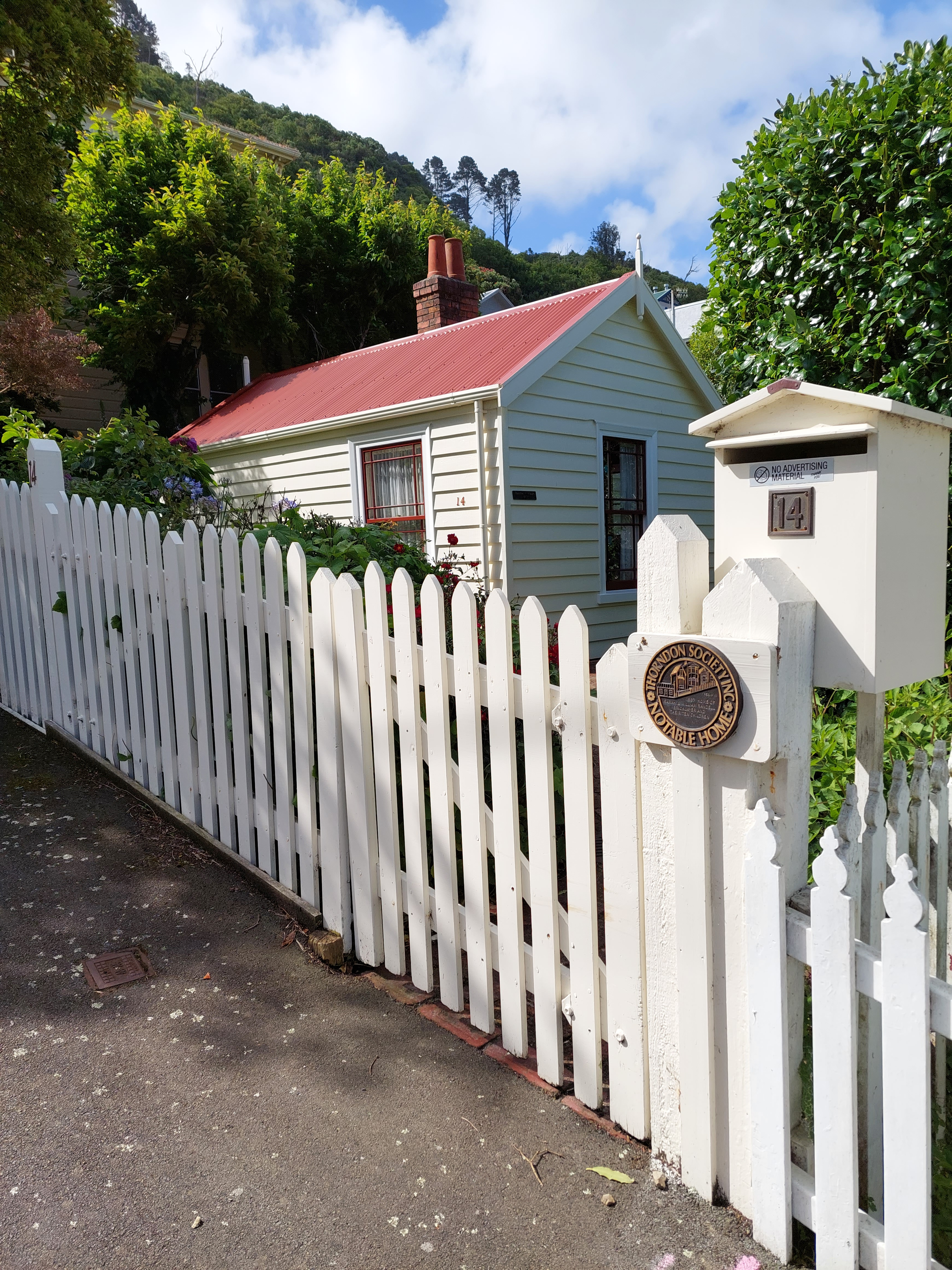
- Randell Cottage as viewed from St Mary Street in Thorndon

General information
- Type: cottage

Heritage New Zealand – Category 2
- Designated: 14 December 1995
- Reference no.: 7281

Randell Cottage was registered by the New Zealand Historic Places Trust (now Heritage New Zealand) on 14 December 1995. The building has a Category II classification. The registration covers the building and the section it is placed on and the rationale for the listing was the "historical and cultural heritage significance and value". Some of the household items uncovered during the restoration of the cottage are held at Te Papa.

== Writers-in-residence ==
The recipients of the residency have been:

Year	New Zealand recipient	French recipient
2002	Peter Wells	Nadine Ribault
2003	Tim Corballis	Charles Juliet
2004	Michael Harlow	Pierre Furlan
2005	Renée	Dominique Mainard
2006	Beryl Fletcher	Annie Saumont
2007	Whiti Hereaka	Nicolas Kurtovitch
2008	Jennifer Compton	Olivier Bleys
2009	Kirsty Gunn	Fariba Hachtroudi
2010	Pat White	Yann Apperry
2011	Peter Walker	Florence Cadier
2012	Vivienne Plumb	
2013	Denis Welch	Estelle Nollet
2014	Tina Makereti	Thanh-Van Tran-Nhut
2015	Witi Ihimaera; Owen Marshall	David Fauquemberg
2016	Stephanie Johnson	Nicolas Fargues
2017	Stephen Daisley	Josef Schovanec
2018	James Norcliffe	Amélie Lucas-Gary
2019	Paddy Richardson	Karin Serres
2020	Michalia Arathimos	Amaury da Cunha
2021	Lynn Davidson	Caroline Laurent
2022	Rose Lu	Caroline Laurent
2023	Rachel O'Neill (poet)	Sedef Ecer
2024	Hinemoana Baker	Julien Blanc-Gras
2025	Saraid de Silva	Titaua Peu
2026		Katia Astafieff
