= Iona Winter =

New Zealand writer

Iona Winter is a New Zealand writer specialising in hybrid fiction, poetry and short fiction.

== Career ==
Winter is of Māori (Waitaha) and Pākehā descent, and holds a Master's degree in Creative Writing from the Auckland University of Technology (AUT). After writing a novel as part of her master's study, she pivoted to writing flash fiction. She cites Hone Tuwhare, Patricia Grace, Sam Hunt, James K Baxter and Witi Ihimaera as influences.

Winter has served as poetry editor for the Otago Daily Times, and in 2016 she was an International Cities of Literature guest reader at the Edinburgh International Book Festival.

Her first collection of stories and poems, and then the wind came, was published by Steele Roberts in 2018. Siobhan Harvey in The New Zealand Herald described it "a stunning book" with themes of nature, family and loss, confirming Winter "as a fresh, necessary voice, one we'll hear a lot more about in the future".

Winter's second collection, Gaps in the Light, was published in 2021. Author Pip Adam described it as "the most amazing and transforming hybrid work" and said she had "never read anything quite like it". Paula Green praised the work's treatment of grief; her review comments that Winter "is translating personal experience into hybrid writing and it is incredibly potent".

=== Multi-disciplinary work ===
Winter's work has appeared on the fence of the Anteroom Art Gallery in Port Chalmers and on a FIFA Women's World Cup mural in The Octagon, Ōtepoti Dunedin. Her 2021 short fiction collection Gaps in The Light is available as a podcast via Otago Access Radio. She contributed to 2020 Dunedin Fringe Festival show (a)version, and has also made several video recordings of her work.

=== Elixir & Star Press ===
Winter is also the founder and editor of Elixir & Star Press, an independent press with a focus on grief. In 2023 she ran a successful crowdfunding campaign to fund the publication of a liminal gathering: 2023 Elixir & Star Grief Almanac, the press's first publication.

== Advocacy ==
Winter's son, musician Reuben Winter (also known as Totems), died in 2020. Winter has since advocated for the suicide bereaved and raised awareness about suicide bereavement.

Winter is also an advocate for te reo Māori, and uses te reo in her work.

== Works ==
- Gaps in The Light (Ad Hoc Fiction, 2021), short fiction
- then the wind came (Steele Roberts, 2018), stories and poems

== Awards ==
- New Zealand Society of Authors mentorship, 2015
- Headland Frontier Prize, 2016
- Second place in the published poets section of the Robert Burns Poetry Competition, 2021, with Jilly O'Brien
- Verb Writer in Residence, 2021
- CLNZ/NZSA Writers' Award for the creative non-fiction project A Counter of Moons, 2022
