= Claire Mabey =

New Zealand writer and editor

Claire Mabey is a New Zealand children's writer, and books editor for The Spinoff. She is the founder of literary festival Verb Wellington. In 2020, Mabey was awarded a Ghost Light Award at Wellington Theatre Awards, and won the NZSA Best First Book Award in 2025 for her 2024 children's book The Raven's Eye Runaways. She published a sequel, The Raven’s Eye Rebellion, in 2026, and a picture book.

== Life ==
Mabey is originally from Tauranga, but studied English and art history at the University of Otago in Dunedin before moving to Wellington. Mabey is a children's writer, and books editor for The Spinoff. She is the founder of literary festival Verb Wellington, and LitCrawl, a series of free literary events that take place within the Verb festival, held in a variety of venues. In 2020 Mabey received a Ghost Light Award at the Wellington Theatre Awards, and was described in the citation as "a force of nature in the Wellington arts community".

In 2024 her first book The Raven's Eye Runaways was published by Allen & Unwin. She had received the 2022 Creative New Zealand Louis Johnson New Writer's Bursary to support her work on the novel. Hera Lindsay Bird described it as "powerfully atmospheric", and said Mabey "pays her young readers the highest compliment, by respecting their intelligence, compassion and capacity for language". The book won the NZSA Best First Book Award at the 2025 New Zealand Book Awards for Children and Young Adults. The sequel The Raven’s Eye Rebellion was published in 2026. Mabey's first picture book, Cass and the Beast, published in 2026, is about a girl who refuses to accept what she is told. Mabey says her childhood was filled with stories about brave little girls.

In 2026, Mabey was awarded the Lynley Dodd Children's Writers Award.

== Bibliography ==
- The Raven's Eye Runaways (Allen & Unwin, 2024)
- The Raven's Eye Rebellion (Allen & Unwin, 2026)
- Cass and the Beast, illustrated by Jill Calder (Gecko Press, 2026)
