= Beryl Fletcher =

New Zealand novelist (1938–2018)

Beryl Joan Fletcher (31 May 1938 – 21 February 2018) was a New Zealand feminist novelist. Her first novel, The Word Burners won the 1992 Commonwealth Writers' Prize, Best First Book, Asia/Pacific region.

She graduated from the University of Waikato with a master's degree in Sociology in 1979. She was resident at the University of Iowa, International Writing Program. In 1999, she was Writer in Residence at Waikato University. In 2005, she was a Ledig House International Writers’ Resident. In 2006, she was Writer in Residence at the Randell Cottage.

== Works ==
- The Word Burners. Daphne Brasell Associates Press. 1991. ISBN 978-0-908896-03-5.; Spinifex Press, 2002, ISBN 978-1-876756-23-9
- The Iron Mouth. Spinifex Press. 1993. ISBN 978-1-875559-22-0.
- The Silicon Tongue. Spinifex Press. 1996. ISBN 978-1-875559-49-7.
- The Bloodwood Clan. Spinifex Press. 1999. ISBN 978-1-875559-80-0.
- Juno and Hannah. Spinifex Press. 2013. ISBN 978-1-74219-875-0

=== Memoir ===
- The House at Karamu. Spinifex Press. 2004. ISBN 978-1-876756-35-2.
