= Rose Lu =

New Zealand author (born 1990)

- Traditional Chinese: 陸楊怡
- Simplified Chinese: 陆杨怡
Transcriptions
Standard Mandarin
- Hanyu Pinyin: Lù Yángyí

Rose Lu (born 1990) is a New Zealand writer and software developer. Her book All Who Live on Islands is a series of autobiographic essays sharing her experience of growing up as a Chinese person in New Zealand and has been acclaimed as "an intimate and confident view of New Zealand life through the eyes of an Asian immigrant". In 2018, she was a recipient of the Creative Nonfiction Prize at the International Institute of Modern Letters. She has a bachelor's degree in mechatronics engineering from University of Canterbury and a master's degree in creative writing from Victoria University of Wellington.

== Biography ==
Lu is from Chongming District, Shanghai, China and came to New Zealand when she was five years old with her parents and grandparents in 1995. The family ended up in Whanganui where her parents owned a dairy and takeaway shop.

She completed her undergraduate degree in mechatronics engineering at the University of Canterbury in 2011. Lu has worked as a software developer since 2012. She studied creative writing at the International Institute of Modern Letters at Victoria University of Wellington graduating in 2018 with a master's degree. When asked about her engineering background in relationship to her creative writing Lu said, "it had a big impact on the level of clarity and precision in my writing". Her technical career started with a role writing software for microcontrollers for a wheelchair company in Christchurch. As of 2021 she works as a web developer as well as being an author, and is based in Wellington.

Lu's book All Who Live on Islands (2019) contains personal essays from the perspective of a Chinese person living in New Zealand and covers topics of racism, culture and family. It was written to capture the experience of growing up "caught between worlds" in China, Whanganui, Christchurch, Palmerston North, Auckland and Wellington. It is unique as there are very few Chinese New Zealand authors published in New Zealand. Lu is amongst a new generation of Asian New Zealand writers and artists, following from a small handful including Helene Wong, Emma Ng, Alison Wong and Kerry Ann Lee. Extracts of Lu's book All Who Live on Islands have appeared in journals and online including Sport, Starling, The Pantograph Punch, Turbine Kapohau and Mimicry.

In December 2021 Lu was announced to be the recipient of the 2022 Randell Cottage Writers' Residency. She said that she would use her six months at the cottage in Thorndon to work on her first novel. She was awarded an emerging writer's residency at the Michael King Writers Centre in 2024.

Literary festivals which have featured Lu include the Auckland Writers Festival and the Verb Wellington Festival. Lu has named authors Esme Weijun Wang, Carmen Maria Machado and Jenny Zhang as her influences.

== Awards ==
- 2018: Creative Nonfiction Prize at the International Institute of Modern Letters, Victoria University of Wellington
- 2022: Randell Cottage Writer in Residence
- 2024: Michael King Writers Centre emerging writer's residency
