= Theocosmus =

Ancient Greek sculptor

Theocosmus (Ancient Greek: Θεόκοσμος, romanized: Theokosmos) was a Greek sculptor born in Megara, active in his city and in Delphi during the second half of the 5th century BC. He was the father of the sculptor Callicles of Megara.

He was part of a family of artists from Megara; in addition to his own work, the sculptural activities of both his son Callicles and his grandson Apellas are documented.

With the help of Phidias, he worked on a seated statue of Zeus for the Olympieion of Megara, which remained unfinished due to the outbreak of the Peloponnesian War in 431 BC and the subsequent incursions of the Athenians into Megarian territory. The face may have been completed in gold and ivory (chryselephantine), but as resources for these materials were unavailable during the war, the rest was made of clay and plaster. At the back of the throne lay some partially worked wooden logs that Theocosmus had intended to cover with ivory and gold and use to complete the statue. Above the god’s head were the Horae and the Moirae. The wooden parts of the rest of the figure, meant for later work, were displayed behind the temple.

He also created the statues that were part of the grand ex-voto dedicated by the Lacedaemonians at Delphi, made from the spoils of the Battle of Aegospotami (405 BC). The work included around forty bronze statues of gods, Spartans, Lysander with his seer Agias, his helmsman Hermon, and a herald, as well as the navarchs of Sparta's allied cities. Therefore, Theocosmus must have flourished from before the beginning to after the end of the Peloponnesian War, roughly around 435–430 BC.

== Bibliography ==
- Pausanias (1918). Description of Greece. Translated by Jones, W. H. S.; Ormerod, H. A. Cambridge, MA; London: Harvard University Press; William Heinemann Ltd.
- Smith, William. A Dictionary of Greek and Roman Biography and Mythology. London. Entry: "Theocosmus".
- Lippold, Georg (1934). "Theokosmos". Paulys Realencyclopädie der classischen Altertumswissenschaft (RE) (in German). V A, 2. Stuttgart: 1999 y sigs.
- Moreno, Paolo (1966). "Theokosmos". Enciclopedia dell'Arte Antica, Classica e Orientale (in Italian). 7. Rom: Istituto della Enciclopedia Italiana.
- Vollkommer, Rainer (2001). "Theokosmos". Künstlerlexikon der Antike (in German). 2: L–Z. Addendum A–K. Saur, München/Leipzig 2004: 891–892. ISBN 3-598-11414-1.
