= Florence Cadier =

French writer (born 1956)

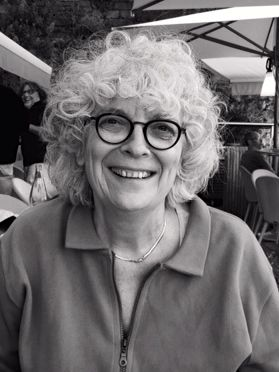
- Born: 1956 (age 69–70) Orléans, France
- Occupation: Children's author; journalist
- Language: French

Florence Cadier (born 1956) is a French writer of books for children and young adults.

== Biography ==
Cardier was born in Orléans, France, in 1956. She has worked as a journalist, and began to write children's literature in 1995.

My Parents are Getting Divorced with Melissa Daly was published in English in 2004 by Amulet Books as part of the Sunscreen self-help series aimed at teenagers. A review in the School Library Journal described it as "a great, upbeat book, giving wise advice in a voice that speaks to kids", although said it was unfortunate that "all but one of the titles in the bibliography are in French". Booklist praised it for its "conversational and warm" tone and "solid, reassuring advice".

Cadier's 2009 novel Le Rêve de Sam received the 5th/4th level prize of the Dévoreurs de livres award, elected by students and teachers in Eure. It also received the Literary Al Terre Ado prize at the Hermillon Book Fair, and the Prix Ados en colère at the 2010 Salon du livre d'expression populaire et de critique sociale d'Arras (a book fair held in Arras). In 2011 Cadier received the Randell Cottage Writers' Residency and spent six months in Wellington, New Zealand. During this residency she wrote the novel L'Ombre d'un père. Her 2015 collection of short stories, Contre courant, focuses on the theme of civil disobedience from a humanist perspective.

Her 2023 novel Né coupable was about the trial of George Stinney and was supported by Amnesty International. It received the 5th/4th prize at the Prix des Incorruptibles awards, elected by young readers, and the Prix littéraire des jeunes Caladois awarded by young people of Villefranche-sur-Saône.

== Selected works ==
- My Parents are Getting Divorced: How to Keep It Together When Your Mom and Dad Are Splitting Up (Abrams/Amulet, 2004) with Melissa Daly; translated from French by Jackie Strachan and Jane Moseley, illustrated by Claire Gandini
- Le Rêve de Sam (Gallimard Jeunesse, 2009)
- L’été des amours (Oslo, 2011)
- L'Ombre d'un père (Thierry Magnier, 2013)
- Contre courant (Le Muscadier, 2015)
- Dans l'ourlet de nos jupes (Talents Hauts, 2017)
- Né coupable (Talents Hauts, 2023)
