= Maëlle Guillaud =

French writer and editor

Maëlle Guillaud (born 1974) is a French writer and editor. Lucie ou la vocation was her debut novel, followed by Une famille tres francaise.
