= Zoé Karelli =

Zoé Karelli was the pen-name used by Chryssoulas Argyriadou (1901–1998), a Greek poet, playwright and essayist.

== Life ==
Chrysoulas Pentziki was born in Thessaloniki. Her younger brother was the writer Nikos Gavril Pentzikis. She married at the age of 17, acquiring the married name Argyriadou. His first poems were published in the journal The Third Eye, and collected in her debut volume, The March. (1940).

== Works ==
=== Poetry ===
- The March, 1940
- Seasons of Death, 1948
- Fantasy of Time, 1949
- Of Solitude and Arrogance, 1951
- Copper Engravings and Sacred Icons, 1952
- The Ship, 1955
- Kassandra and Other Poems, 1955
- Tales from the Garden, 1955
- Contrasts, 1957
- The Mirror of Midnight, 1958

=== Plays ===
- Suppliants, 1962
- Simonis, Byzantine Prince, 1965
- Orestes, 1971
