= Nadine Ribault =

French writer (1964–2021)

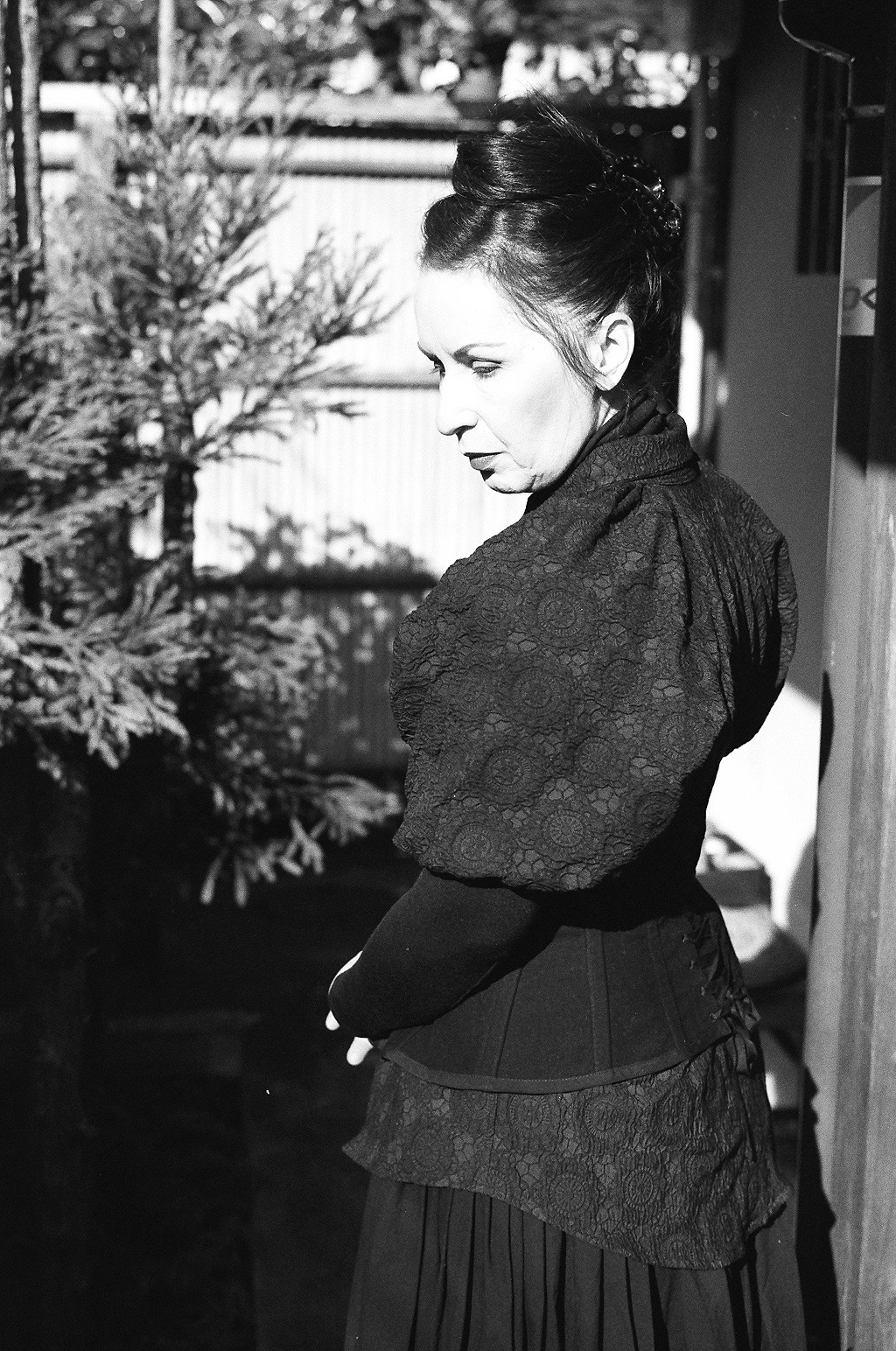
- Ribault, 2014
- Born: Nadine Nicole Claire Payet; 20 January 1964; Paris, France
- Died: 15 January 2021 (aged 56); Condette, France
- Education: La Sorbonne (BA)
- Occupations: Novelist; short story writer; translator
- Spouse: Thierry Ribault
- Children: 1

Nadine Nicole Claire Ribault (née Payet; 20 January 1964 – 15 January 2021) was a French novelist, short story writer and translator.

== Life and career ==
Ribault was born in Paris on 20 January 1964. She graduated from La Sorbonne with a bachelor's degree in French literature. She taught French and French literature in France and Japan.

Ribault's first book of short stories Un caillou à la mer was published in 1999. It was translated into English by Jean Anderson and published under the title A Pebble in the Sea. Her first novel Festina Lente was published in 2000.

In 2002 she was the first French recipient of the Randell Cottage Writers' Residency in New Zealand. As part of this residency she spent five months living and working at Randell Cottage in Wellington, and wrote her second collection of short stories, Cœur anxieux. She also had a poem published in Poetry New Zealand. In 2012, she said of her experience in New Zealand (translated by Jean Anderson):

Nature is the nourishment that gives us strength for the struggle, and in New Zealand, exactly ten years ago, I was very well nourished. Cliffs, beaches, fjords, bays, lagoons, rivers, volcanoes, mountains, forests, all filled me with their magic and a wonderful energy. I feed from it still, it nourishes my sense of struggle and my dreams.

In 2006 Ribault and Anderson collaborated on the first French translation of Janet Frame's book of short stories, The Lagoon and Other Stories. It was published as Le Lagon et Autres Nouvelles by Éditions des Femmes. A review in New Zealand Books describes it as a "tour de force" which respects Frame's language and style choices. In the same year, Ribault's novel Le vent et la lumière was published.

She was married to economist Thierry Ribault, and they had one daughter. Together with Thierry she published Les sanctuaires de l'abîme – chronique du désastre de Fukushima (Éditions de l'Encyclopédie des Nuisances, 2012), a work which criticised the response of the Japanese government to the Fukushima nuclear accident. In 2012 she also published Carnets des Cévennes and Carnets des Cornouailles with Éditions Le mot et le reste.

Ribault's historical novel Les Ardents, set in the 11th century, was published in 2019. She died on 15 January 2021 at Condette.
