= Katia Astafieff =

French writer (born 1975)

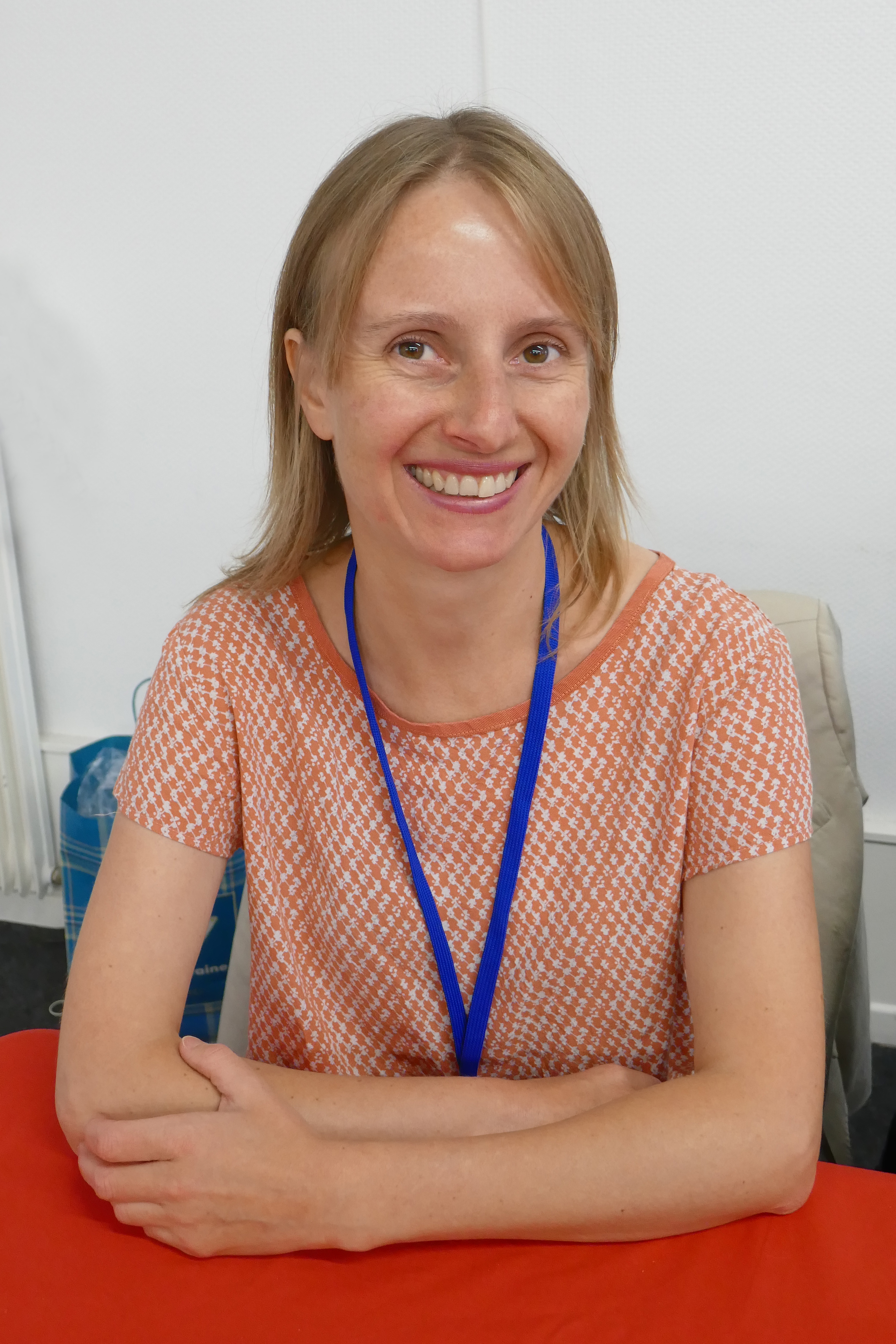
- Astafieff in 2016
- Born: 1975 (age 50–51); Villerupt, France
- Occupations: Travel writer; novelist; children's author
- Writing career
- Language: French
- Website: katia-astafieff.fr

Katia Astafieff (born 1975) is a French travel writer, novelist and children's author. Born in Villerupt and based in Lorraine, she has a background in biology and has worked at the Jardins botaniques du Grand Nancy et de l'Université de Lorraine, where she later became deputy director. Astafieff's notable books include Comment voyager seule quand on est petite, blonde et aventureuse ("How to travel alone when one is petite, blonde, and adventurous", 2016) and Par les chemins des Indes ("Along Indian Routes") (2025).

== Biography ==
Astafieff was born in Villerupt, France in 1975. She studied biology and completed an internship in Montreal, Canada, where she began to develop a love of solo travelling. In 2004 she began working at the Jardins botaniques du Grand Nancy et de l'Université de Lorraine in a public-facing role; she later became the deputy director.

In 2016, she published a travel book titled Comment voyager seule quand on est petite, blonde et aventureuse ("How to travel alone when one is petite, blonde, and adventurous"). In 2019, Astafieff hiked the International Appalachian Trail in Canada; her children's novel La fille qui voulait voir l’ours arose out of this experience.

Astafieff's 2025 book Par les chemins des Indes ("Along Indian Routes") was inspired by the life of botanist Victor Jacquemont; Astafieff travelled solo in India on the same route as Jacquemont. Her first attempt at the route ended in hospitalisation with food poisoning; she completed the journey on her second attempt.

In 2026, Astafieff received the Randell Cottage Writers' Residency, a four-month residency in Wellington, New Zealand. She plans to use her time at Randell Cottage to work on a project about Marianne North, an English illustrator.

== Selected works ==
- Comment voyager seule quand on est petite, blonde et aventureuse (Editions du Trésor, 2016)
- L'Aventure extraordinaire des plantes voyageuses (Éditions Dunod, 2018)
- La fille qui voulait voir l’ours (Éditions Arthaud, 2022)
- L’aventure extraordinaire des plantes voyageuses (Éditions Dunod, 2023)
- Par les chemins des Indes: Sur les traces du botaniste français qui aurait pu devenir vice-roi du Cachemire (Éditions Paulsen, 2025)
