= Sophie de Renneville =

French writer, editor and journalist (1772–1822)

- Born: Sophie de Senneterre; 1772; Senneterre, Caen, France
- Died: 1822 (aged 49–50); Paris, France
- Other name: Marquise de Senneterre
- Occupations: Writer, editor, journalist

Sophie de Renneville or Madame de Renneville, was the pen name of Sophie de Senneterre, who was born in Senneterre, Caen, France in 1772 and died in Paris in 1822 at 50. She was a writer, editor and journalist.

== Biography ==
Sophie was born the Marquise de Senneterre into French nobility in Normandy, and she took up writing to support her family, which had been financially ruined during the French Revolution. Using a pen name to assure anonymity, she published many books intended for young people, some of which have been translated, such as Charles and Eugenia (1926) in English, or Savinianito, o Historia de un joven huérfano (English: Savinianito, or Story of a young orphan) (1820) in Spanish, and the Dot, which was translated into Russian. The primary themes of her books included the proper role of young girls in good society, moral stories and history.

In addition to her writings for children, she also published politically engaging works for adults such as Life of Saint Clotilde, Queen of France, wife of the Great Clovis, followed by a précis mixed with anecdotes, concerning the mores and customs of the first centuries of the French monarchy (1809).

=== Feminist ===
In addition to her books, Renneville was also editor of the feminist periodical Athénée des dames which confronted the masculine-centered ideas of the French society of her time and provided female readers with a forum to voice alternative perspectives.

Her writings provided a common ground that allowed her audiences, even those who read her work in the years following Renneville's death, to campaign for better and more fair treatment by society at large. According to Karen Offen, she had a profound effect on another feminist, Henriette Wild.

"The author's [Henriette's] focus on the sage femme, which renders in English both as 'midwife' and as 'wise woman,' is significant; a key issue in Parisian women's protest in the 1840s was the admission of women to the study of medicine and, more generally, to higher learning, to savoir or learned knowledge. The book referred to [by Henriette] by the much published Mme de Renneville (née Sophie de Senneterre) is doubtless her Biographie des femmes Ulustres de Rome, de la Grèce et du Bas-Empire (Paris: Parmantier, 1825)."

In that book by Renneville, her female protagonist named Agnodice from Athens, decided to dressed as a man so she could attend "the famous school of Herophilus to study medicine and especially the art of midwifery." After opening her own practice, she proved to be a popular physician but, when she was unmasked, was condemned by her male colleagues by "invoking the law that denied her the right to practice medicine." But the outcry from Agnodice's patients, and the greater female community, caused the law to be overturned. In 19th century France, readers popularized the book and bemoaned the fact that Renneville's heroine was only fiction.

== Selected publications ==
According to WorldCat, Renneville has 288 works in 700 publications in 5 languages and 1,296 library holdings worldwide, as of 2020.

- Vie de Ste Clotilde, reine de France, femme du grand Clovis, suivie d’un Précis mêlé d’anecdotes, concernant les mœurs et coutumes des premiers siècles de la monarchie française, Paris, Villet, 1809
- Biographie des femmes illustres : de Rome, de la Grèce et du Bas-Empire, Paris, Parmantier, 1825
- À bas la Cabale. Par un anonyme qui n’a jamais vu Buonaparte, Paris, Pierre Blanchard, 1814
- Adèle & Justine, ou, Histoires d’une grand’ tante, Paris, Lavigne, 1900
- Amusements de l’adolescence, ou, Lectures instructives et agréables à l’usage des deux sexes, Paris, Nepveu, 1815
- Antony, ou La conscience : suivi de petites histoires morales et instructives, Paris, Lavigne, 1838
- Beautés de l’histoire du jeune âge : ouvrage propre à inspirer aux jeunes gens l’amour de leur devoir et de toutes les vertus, Paris, Thierot et Berlin, 1823
- Contes à ma petite fille et à mon petit garçon : pour les amuser, leur former un bon cœur, et les corriger des petits défauts de leur âge, Paris, Saintin, 1817
- Contes pour les enfans de cinq à six ans, Paris, Blanchard, 1829
- Conversations d’une petite fille avec sa poupée ; suivies de L’histoire de la poupée, Paris, Billois, 1813
- Correspondance de deux petites filles : ouvrage propre à former de bonne heure les enfans au style épistolaire, Paris, Belin Le Prieur, 1811
- Coutumes gauloises : ou, origines curieuses et peu connues de la plupart de nos usages, Paris, Lavigne, 1834
- Éducation de la poupée, ou Petits dialogues instructifs et moraux, à la portée du jeune âge, Paris, A. Eymery, 1822
- Éducation par l’histoire, ou école des jeunes gens : contenant des modèles de toutes les vertus du premier ordre, pris parmi les français de différentes classes ; extraits des ouvrages de Rollin, Bossuet, Fénélon, l’abbé Barthélemy, et autres auteurs célèbres, Paris, Genets jeune, 1820
- Galerie des femmes vertueuses, ou Leçons de morale, à l’usage des demoiselles, Paris, Le Prieur, 1808
- Galerie des jeunes vierges, ou, Modèle des vertus qui assurent le bonheur des femmes : ouvrage destiné aux jeunes personnes de tous les états : où l’on prouve, par des exemples, qu’un cœur pur est le premier des biens : qu’il est le garant de toutes les vertus chrétiennes et des qualités sociales : que l’innocence de mœurs appelée sagesse fait la bonne fille, l’épouse respectable, ainsi que la bonne mère : qu’enfin, elle assure aux femmes des jours heureux jusque dans la vieillesse la plus avancée, Paris, Thiérot et Belin, 1824
- La fée bienfaisante, ou, La mère ingénieuse, Paris, A. Eymery, 1814
- La mère gouvernante, ou Principes de politesse fondés sur les qualités du cœur, Paris, Belin-Le Prieur, 1812
- Le Conteur moraliste : ou, Le bonheur par la vertu. Contes, Paris, Belin-Leprieur, 1820
- Le livre des enfants laborieux ; ou, petits tableaux des principales connaissances mises à la portée des enfants : suivis de fables et de petits contes amusans et instructifs, Paris, A. Eymery, 1824
- Le livre du second âge, dédié aux pères et mères de famille ; contenant, en abrégé, les articles qui suivent: religion, ancien testament, sphère, géographie, troisième race des rois de France, quadrupèdes, mythologie, et des contes, Paris, Lavigne, 1836
- Le Petit Philippe, ou, l’Émulation excitée par l’amour filial, Paris, Brianchon, 1824
- Le petit Savinien, ou, Histoire d’un jeune orphelin, Paris, Genets jeune, 1815
- Le précepteur des enfans, ou Livre du second âge, dédié aux pères et mères de famille; contenant, en abrégé, les articles qui suivant: religion, Ancien Testament, grammaire, sphère, géographie, troisième race des rois de France; quadrupèdes, mythologie, et des contes, Paris, Ledoux et Tenré, 1818
- Le retour des vendanges ; contes moraux et instructifs à la portée des enfants de différents ages, Paris, chez Genets jeune, libraire, 14 rue Dauphine, 1820
- Le réveil de Napoléon; ou, Les destins de la France accomplis, Paris, Delaunay, 1815
- L’école chrétienne, Paris, Thomine, 1800
- Les aventures de Télamon ou, Les Athéniens sous la monarchie, Paris, Villet, 1819
- Les bons petits enfants contes et dialogues pour le jeune âge, Limoges : Ardant, 1882
- Les deux éducations : ou, Le pouvoir de l’exemple, Paris, Eymery, 1813
- Les enfants de quinze ans, Paris, Lebailly, 1842
- Les espiègleries de l’enfance : ou, L’indulgence maternelle. Contes et historiettes propres à être donnés aux enfans de l’âge de six à huit ans, Paris, Nadau, 1824
- Les fagots de monsieur Croque-Mitaine : contes pour les petits enfants, Paris, Genets, 1821
- Les récréations d’Eugénie, contes propres à former le cœur et à développer la raison des enfans, Paris, Genets jeune, 1815
- Lettres d’Octavie, jeune pensionnaire de la maison de Saint-Clair : ou, Essai sur l’éducation des demoiselles, Paris, Villet, 1818
- Miss Lovely de Macclesfield, ou, Le domino noir, Paris, Mme Ve Lepetit, 1811
- Mythologie de la jeunesse. Ornée d’un grand nombre de gravures, Paris, Bellavoine 1822
- Nouvelle mythologie du jeune âge, Paris, Genets Jeune, 1822
- Palmyre; ou, L’Éducation de l’Expérience, Paris, Parmentier, 1823
- Parafaragaramus, ou, Croquignole et sa famille : folie dédiée aux écoliers, Paris, Ledoux et Tenré, 1817
- Polichinelle instituteur : sur le théâtre duquel on voit figurer Mlle. Fanferluche, Rustaud, Mr. Brise-Ménage, & a., & a., Paris, Genets, 1817
- Récréations instructives et amusantes, ou, Choix d’historiettes morales tirées des ouvrages de Mesdames de Choiseul, de Renneville, Jauffret et al., à l’usage de la jeunesse, Philadelphie : H. Perkins, 1835
- Stanislas, roi de Pologne, roman historique, suivi d’un abrégé de l’histoire de Pologne et de Lorraine, Paris, C. Villet, 1807
- Veillées d’hiver, Lyon, Gilbertson et Brun, 1840
