= Paul Gadenne =

French novelists

Paul Gadenne (4 April 1907 – 1 May 1956) was a French writer. He wrote six novels that were published during his lifetime and were followed by several posthumous works. His most prominent novel is La plage de Scheveningen (The Beach at Scheveningen) (1952) which deals with Christian faith and moral consequences of collaboration during the Second World War, as well as epuration trials. This work is partly inspired by the trial of collaborationist writer Robert Brasillach while its title alludes a painting by Jacob van Ruisdael. His other known works include his debut novel Siloé (1941) and the short story "Baleine" (1949). Gadenne's stories place heavy emphasis on the inner lives of the characters. Henri Peyre described him as "one of the least superficial" novelists in modern literature. His life and work were influenced by three factors: a strong Catholic faith, the moral compromises of French intellectuals in the face of fascism, and the chronic tuberculosis that ultimately took him prematurely (Siloé and the posthumous Les Hauts Quartiers share many similarities with Thomas Mann's The Magic Mountain). Gadenne's work can also be seen as a transition or link between psychological naturalism, existentalist novel, and Nouveau Roman.
