= Sarah B. Pomeroy =

American Professor of Classics (born 1938)

- Born: March 13, 1938 (age 88)

Academic background
- Education: Barnard College (BA) Columbia University
- Thesis: (1961)
- Doctoral advisor: John Day

Academic work
- Discipline: Ancient History, Classics
- Sub-discipline: Women in Ancient Rome, Women in Ancient Greece
- Institutions: Graduate Center, CUNY, Hunter College

Sarah B. Pomeroy (born March 13, 1938) is an American Professor of Classics.

== Early life and education ==
Sarah Pomeroy was born in New York City in 1938. She attended the Birch Wathen School, taking Latin and ancient history among other subjects. She graduated high school at age 16, and began a degree course at Barnard College in Classics, taking courses at Columbia University alongside those at Barnard, due to the small size of the Barnard department at the time. Pomeroy graduated in 1957, at the age of nineteen, and began a course of graduate study at Columbia, under the supervision of Eve Harrison and Otto Brendel. During her graduate study, she worked on papyrology with John Day, and from 1962 to 1963, she also undertook a course of study in Roman Law at Columbia. Her PhD dissertation studied the first published lease of an olive grove from Karanis in Egypt.

== Academic career ==
Pomeroy moved to The University of Texas at Austin in order to take up her first job in 1961, where she worked until 1962. In 1964, she took a post as a lecturer at Hunter College, where she remained until 1965. She worked at Brooklyn College from 1967 to 1968, before returning to Hunter in 1968, where she remained for the rest of her career. She also began working as a faculty member in Classics at the Graduate School at City University of New York in 1978, and later was also appointed to the Program in History. She was named a Distinguished Professor of Hunter College in 1996, and in 2003, she was awarded the title of Professor Emerita of Classics and History of Hunter College and The Graduate Center.

Pomeroy has been the recipient of multiple distinguished fellowships and awards over the course of her career. She held a Ford Foundation Fellowship, was recognised in the “Salute to Scholars” reception by the City University of New York in 1981–1982, and won the City University President's Award in Scholarship in 1995. She was elected Guggenheim Fellow at the John Simon Guggenheim Memorial Foundation in 1998, and has received grants from the American Council of Learned Societies, the Ford Foundation, the National Endowment for the Humanities, the Andrew W. Mellon Foundation, and the American Numismatic Society. In 2003, she gave the Josephine Earle Memorial Lecture at Hunter College. She has also been elected to the American Philosophical Society.

== Scholarship and influence ==
Pomeroy's first book, Goddesses, Whores, Wives, and Slaves: Women in Classical Antiquity was published in 1975 and is one of the first English works on women's history in any period. Its lasting influence led to its reissue in 1994, and it has been described by an editor at Random House as "one of the five paradigm-changing books of the 20th century." The work has been translated into German, Italian and Spanish. It has since been used as a textbook in many university-level courses on gender studies, and Pomeroy herself describes the book as being part of her teaching the "first course in America on women in antiquity." Her other works include Xenophon, Oeconomicus: A Social and Historical Commentary (1994), Families in Classical and Hellenistic Greece: Representations and Realities (1998), Spartan Women (2002), and, with Stanley M. Burstein, Walter Donlan, and Jennifer Tolbert Roberts, the textbooks Ancient Greece: a Political, Social, and Cultural History (4th edition, 2017) and A Brief History of Ancient Greece: Politics, Society, and Culture (3rd edition, 2011).

== Books ==
- Goddesses, Whores, Wives, and Slaves: Women in Classical Antiquity (Schocken, 1975); ISBN 9780805205305
- Ancient History (with Stanley M. Burstein, 1984); ISBN 9780910129114
- Women in Hellenistic Egypt: From Alexander to Cleopatra (Schocken, 1984); ISBN 9780805239119
- Women's History and Ancient History (Chapel Hill, 1991); ISBN 9780807819494
- Oeconomicus: A Social and Historical Commentary, with Xenophon (Clarendon Press, 1994); ISBN 9780198140825
- Families in Classical and Hellenistic Greece: Representations and Realities (Oxford University Press, 1997); ISBN 9780198152606
- Ancient Greece: A Political, Social, and Cultural History (with Stanley M. Burstein, Walter Donlan and Jennifer Tolbert Roberts, Oxford University Press, 1999); ISBN 9780195097436
- Plutarch’s Advice to the Bride and Groom and A Consolation to His Wife: English Translations, Commentary, Interpretive Essays, and Bibliography (Oxford University Press, 1999); ISBN 9780195120233
- Spartan Women (Oxford University Press, 2002); ISBN 9780195130669
- A Brief History of Ancient Greece: Politics, Society, and Culture (with Stanley M. Burstein, Walter Donlan and Jennifer Tolbert Roberts, Oxford University Press, 2004); ISBN 9780195156812
- The Murder of Regilla: A Case of Domestic Violence in Antiquity (Harvard University Press, 2007); ISBN 9780674042209
- Pythagorean Women (Johns Hopkins University Press, 2013); ISBN 9781421409566
- Maria Sibylla Merian: Artist, Scientist, Adventurer (with Jeyaraney Kathirithamby, J. Paul Getty Museum, 2018); ISBN 978-1947440012
- Benjamin Franklin, Swimmer: An Illustrated History (American Philosophical Society Press, 2021); ISBN 9781606181065

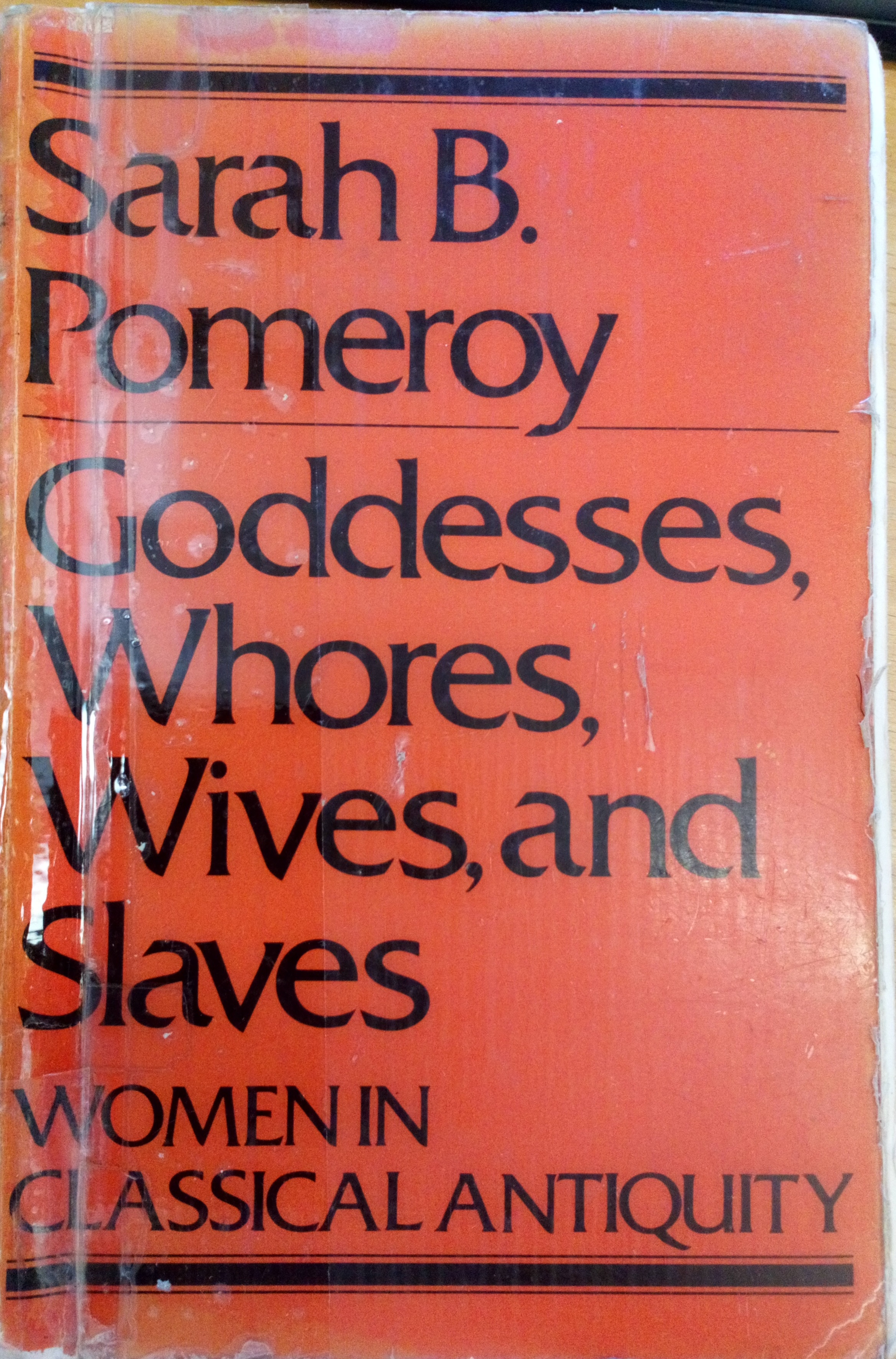
Front cover of Sarah B. Pomeroy's Goddesses, Whores, Wives and Slaves. Women in Classical Antiquity (1975)
