= List of French women writers =

This is a list of women writers born in France, or whose writings are closely associated with France.

== A ==
- Geneviève Aclocque (1884–1967), historian
- Juliette Adam (1836–1936), novelist, non-fiction writer, and magazine editor
- Marie d'Agoult, pen name Daniel Stern (1805–1876), novelist, essayist, and history writer
- Mathilde Alanic (1864–1948), novelist, short-story writer
- Anne-Marie Albiach (1937–2012), poet and translator
- Hortense Allart (1801–1879), feminist writer and essayist
- Almucs de Castelnau (12th century), troubadour poet, writing in Occitan
- Catherine d'Amboise (1475–1550), semi-autobiographical novelist and poet
- Virginie Ancelot (1792–1875), painter and playwright
- Alix André (1909–2000), romance novelist
- Christine Angot (born 1959), novelist and playwright
- Leili Anvar (born 1967), Persian-French writer and translator
- Azalaïs d'Arbaud (1834–1917), Occitan-language writer
- Sophie d'Arbouville (1810–1850), poet and short-story writer
- Henri Ardel (1863–1938), writer, novelist
- Catherine Arley, pen name of Pierrette Pernot (1922–2016), novelist and actress
- Marie Célestine Amélie d'Armaillé (1830–1918), writer, biographer, and historian
- Angélique Arnaud (1799–1884), novelist, essayist, and feminist
- Katia Astafieff (born 1975), travel writer, novelist and children's author
- Madeleine de l'Aubespine (1546–1596), poet, literary patron, and one of the earliest female erotic poets
- Gwenaëlle Aubry (born 1971), novelist, philosopher, and non-fiction writer
- Colette Audry (1906–1990), novelist, screenwriter, and critic
- Marie-Catherine d'Aulnoy (c. 1650–1705), writer of fairy tales and historical novels
- Aurélia Aurita (born 1980), comic book author
- Félicie d'Ayzac (1801–1881), poet, art historian
- Azalais de Porcairagues (12th century), Occitan-language troubadour

== B ==
- Victoire Babois (1760–1839), writer of elegies
- Marie-Claire Bancquart (1932–2019), poet, essayist, critic, and educator
- Tristane Banon (born 1979), novelist, journalist, and television presenter
- Arvède Barine (1840–1908), non-fiction writer, historian, and literary critic
- Natalie Clifford Barney (1876–1972), American-born poet, playwright, and novelist, who wrote mainly in French
- Lauren Bastide (born 1981), French journalist
- Sophie Bawr (1773–1860), playwright, non-fiction writer
- Fanny de Beauharnais (1737–1813), poet, novelist, playwright, and salonist
- Simone de Beauvoir (1908–1986), novelist, essayist, existentialist philosopher, and feminist
- Béatrix Beck (1914–2008), novelist, short-story writer, and poet of Belgian origin
- Alice Becker-Ho (born 1941), poet and non-fiction writer
- Claude de Bectoz (1490–1547), poet and letter writer
- Géraldine Beigbeder, novelist, screenwriter
- Maud de Belleroche (1922–2017), best-selling novelist, memoirist, and biographer
- Loleh Bellon (1925–1999), actress and playwright
- Yannick Bellon (1924–2019), film director and screenwriter
- Juliette Benzoni (1920–2016), novelist
- Catherine Bernard (1662–1712), poet, playwright, and novelist
- Paulette Bernège (1896–1973), journalist, housework specialist, and prolific non-fiction writer
- Emmanuèle Bernheim (1955–2017), novelist and screenwriter
- Carmen Bernos de Gasztold (1919–1995), poet
- Jean Bertheroy (1858–1927), writer
- Louise Bertin (1805–1877), composer and poet
- Mireille Best (1943–2005), novelist, often featuring lesbian characters
- Nella Bielski (1930s – 2020), Ukrainian-born French novelist and actress
- Gisèle Bienne (born 1946), novelist and writer for young adults
- Raphaële Billetdoux (born 1951), novelist
- Augustine-Malvina Blanchecotte (1830–1897), poet
- Stella Blandy (1836–1925), writer and feminist
- Janine Boissard (born 1932), writer
- Lucie Boissonnas (1839–1877), author
- Marie Bonaparte-Wyse (1831–1902), novelist, playwright
- Itxaro Borda (born 1959), novelist, poet, translator in Basque language
- Louise de Bossigny (died 1700), fairy-tale writer
- Laurence Bougault (1970–2018), poet, essayist, and travel writer
- Claire Bouilhac (born 1970), bande dessinée illustrator, scriptwriter, colorist
- Catherine de Bourbon (1559–1604), princess, poet, and letter writer
- Louise Bourbonnaud (c. 1847–1915), writer, explorer, and philanthropist
- Charlotte Bourette (1714–1784), poet, playwright and lemonade seller
- Jeanne Bouvier (1865–1964), feminist and trade unionist
- Sarah Bouyain (born 1968), novelist and film director
- Nina Bouraoui (born 1967), novelist
- Dounia Bouzar (born 1964), anthropologist and writer
- Marie-Anne de Bovet (1855 – unknown date), novelist and journalist
- Brada (1847–1938), novelist, biographer, memoirist, scriptwriter
- Anne-Sophie Brasme (born 1984), novelist
- Geneviève Brisac (born 1951), novelist, short-story writer, children's writer, critic, and screenwriter
- Jacqueline-Aimée Brohon (1731–1778), novelist and essayist
- Josette Bruce (1920–1996), Polish-born novelist
- Fabienne Brugère (born in 1964), non-fiction writer
- Andrée Brunin (1937–1993), poet, many of whose works have been set to music

== C ==
- Florence Cadier (born 1956), children's author and journalist
- Claude Cahun (1894–1954), poet, novelist, photograph, essayist, translator, and résistante
- Nina de Callias (1843–1884), poet and salonnière
- Amélie-Julie Candeille (1767–1834), composer, librettist, and playwright
- Marcelle Capy (1891–1962), novelist, journalist, and pacifist
- Marie Cardinal (1929–2001), novelist
- Pauline Cassin Caro (1828/1834/1835–1901), novelist
- Castelloza (13th century), troubadour poet
- Claire Castillon (born 1975), novelist and playwright
- Bernadette Cattanéo (1899–1963), newspaper editor, magazine co-founder, trade unionist, and communist activist
- Agathe-Pauline Caylac de Caylan (1782–1847), novelist, essayist, contributor to periodicals and historian
- Anne-Marie Cazalis (1920–1988), journalist, poet, essayist, novelist, and actress
- Charlotte-Rose de Caumont de La Force (1654–1724), novelist, poet, and memoirist
- Rose Celli (1895–1982), novelist, children's author, playwright, translator, and poet
- Rosine de Chabaud-Latour (1794–1860), translator
- Françoise Chandernagor (born 1945), novelist and playwright
- Véronique Chankowski (born 1971), French historian, non-fiction writer
- Edmonde Charles-Roux (1920–2016), novelist, journalist, and photographer
- Noëlle Châtelet (born 1944), essayist, novelist, short-story writer, and educator
- Chantal Chawaf (born 1943), novelist and essayist
- Madeleine Chapsal (1925–2024), novelist, poet, and critic
- Charlotte Saumaise de Chazan (1619–1684), poet and lady in waiting
- Élisabeth Sophie Chéron (1648–1711), painter, poet, and translator
- Maryse Choisy (1903–1979), philosopher, novelist, and non-fiction writer
- Hélène Cixous (born 1937), Algerian-born French novelist, poet, playwright, philosopher, critic, and feminist writer
- Fanny Clar (1875–1944), French journalist and writer
- Catherine Clément (born 1939), philosopher, novelist, feminist, and critic
- Gabrielle de Coignard (1550–1586), religious poet
- Louise Colet (1810–1876), poet, novelist, salonist
- Colette (1873–1954), novelist, author of Gigi
- Henriette de Coligny de La Suze (1618–1673), poet
- Anne-Hyacinthe de Colleville (1761–1824), novelist and playwright
- Danielle Collobert (1940–1978), poet, novelist, short-story writer, and journalist
- Rose Combe (1883–1932), novelist
- Sophie Ristaud Cottin (1770–1807), novelist, including several historical novels
- Hélisenne de Crenne (1510–1552), novelist, epistolary writer, and translator
- Pauline Marie Armande Craven (1808–1891), non-fiction writer

== D ==
- Jocelyne Dakhlia (born 1959), French historian, anthropologist, and academic
- Gilberte H. Dallas, pen name of Gilberte Herschtel (1918–1960), poet, important member of the poètes maudits
- Gerty Dambury (born 1957), poet, playwright, and theatre director from Guadeloupe
- Marie Darrieussecq (born 1969), novelist
- Countess Dash, pen name of Gabrielle Anne Cisterne de Courtiras, vicomtesse de Saint-Mars (1804–1872), novelist
- Régine Deforges (1935–2014), novelist, short-story writer, essayist, and playwright
- Alix Delaporte (born 1969), film director and screenwriter
- Lucie Delarue-Mardrus (1874–1945), poet, novelist, journalist, and sculptor
- Florence Delay (1941–2025), novelist, essayist, playwright, translator, and actress
- Jeanine Delpech (1905–1992), journalist, translator, and novelist
- Sylvie Denis (born 1963), novelist, magazine editor, and translator
- Maria Deraismes (1828–1894), playwright, essayist, and women's rights activist
- Maryline Desbiolles (born 1959), novelist
- Marceline Desbordes-Valmore (1786–1859), poet and novelist
- Antoinette Des Houlières (1638–1694), poet
- Marie-Anne Desmarest (1904–1973), novelist
- Catherine Des Roches (1542–1587), Renaissance poet, daughter of Madelaine Des Roches
- Madeleine Des Roches (c. 1520–1587), Renaissance poet, mother of Catherine Des Roches
- Madeleine Desroseaux (1873–1939), Breton poet, novelist, playwright, and short-story writer
- Jeanne Deroin (1805–1894), journalist and women's activist after the Revolution
- Dominique Desanti (1920–2011), journalist, novelist, biographer, and educator
- Agnès Desarthe (born 1966), children's writer and novelist
- Anne Desclos (1907–1998), journalist, novelist, and translator, known under pen-names Pauline Réage and Dominique Aury
- Madeleine Desroseaux (1873–1939), Breton-language poet and novelist
- Régine Deforges (1935–2014) best-selling novelist, editor, director, and playwright, known for her erotic works
- Antoinette Deshoulières (1638–1694), poet
- Virginie Despentes (born 1969), novelist and autobiographer
- Marie Desplechin (born 1959), novelist and children's writer
- Jane Dieulafoy (1851–1916), archaeologist, novelist, and journalist
- Fatou Diome (born 1968), French-Senegalese French-language novelist, short story writer, and essayist
- Clotilde Dissard (1873–1919), journalist and feminist
- Louisa Emily Dobrée (fl. ca. 1877–1917), novelist, short-story writer, children's writer, non-fiction writer
- Geneviève Dormann (1933–2015), journalist and novelist
- Camille Drevet (1881–1969), editor-in-chief, La Voix des femmes
- Pernette Du Guillet (c. 1520–1545), Renaissance poet
- Caroline Dubois (born 1960), poet
- Charlotte Dubreuil (born 1940), novelist, filmmaker, and screenwriter
- Catherine Dufour (born 1966), novelist
- Claire de Duras (1777–1828), novelist, author of Ourika
- Marguerite Duras (1914–1996), novelist, playwright, and screenwriter of Hiroshima mon amour
- Vanessa Duriès (1972–1993), novelist author of The Ties That Bind
- Yvette Duval (1931–2006), Moroccan-born French historian, specializing in ancient North Africa

== E ==
- Françoise d'Eaubonne (1920–2005), feminist essayist and science-fiction novelist
- Alexandrine des Écherolles (1779–1850), memoirist
- Catherine Enjolet, French novelist and essayist
- Annie Ernaux (born 1940), autobiographical novelist
- Gisèle d'Estoc (1845–1894), writer, sculptor, and feminist
- Claire Etcherelli (1934–2023), novelist

== F ==
- Geneviève Fauconnier (1886–1969), novelist
- Madame de La Fayette (1634–1693), novelist, author of La Princesse de Clèves
- Nathalie Ferlut (born 1968), comic book illustrator, scriptwriter, colorist
- Juliette Figuier (1827–1879), playwright and novelist
- Amanda Filipacchi (born 1967), French-born American novelist
- Aurélie Filippetti (born 1973), novelist
- Adelaide Filleul (1761–1836), novelist
- Clara Filleul (1822–1878), painter and children's writer
- Zénaïde Fleuriot (1829–1890), prolific novelist, writing for young women
- Pierrette Fleutiaux (1941–2019), novelist and short-story writer
- Brigitte Fontaine (born 1939), singer, novelist, playwright, and poet
- Viviane Forrester (1925–2013), essayist, novelist, and critic
- Jeanne-Justine Fouqueau de Pussy (1786–1863), author of children's and educational works
- Jocelyne François (born 1933), lesbian novelist, poet, and diarist
- Camille Froidevaux-Metterie (born 1968), non-fiction writer and novelist

== G ==
- Marie-Louise Gagneur (1832–1902), essayist, novelist, and feminist
- Jeanne Galzy (1883–1977), novelist and biographer
- Anne-Marie Garat (1946–2022), novelist
- Delphine Gardey (born 1967), non-fiction writer
- Anne F. Garréta (born 1962), novelist
- Judith Gautier (1845–1917), poet, historical novelist, playwright, translator, and music critic
- Anna Gavalda (born 1970), best-selling novelist, short-story writer, and works widely translated
- Sophie Gay (1776–1852), novelist, playwright, and librettist
- Stéphanie Félicité, comtesse de Genlis (1746–1830), novelist, playwright, and children's writer
- Rosemonde Gérard (1871–1953), poet and playwright
- Sylvie Germain (born 1954), novelist, essayist, and biographer
- Amélie Gex (1835–1883), poet, who also wrote in Franco-Provençal
- Azza Ghanmi (fl. 1970s), feminist editor
- Delphine de Girardin (1804–1855), essayist, poet, and novelist
- Anne Golon (1921–2017), novelist author of the Angélique series of historical novels
- Mélanie Gouby (active since 2011), journalist
- Olympe de Gouges (1748–1793), playwright and feminist writer, executed after the French Revolution
- Marie de Gournay (1585–1645), novelist, essayist, and critic
- Françoise de Graffigny (1695–1758), novelist and playwright
- Évelyne Grandjean (born 1939), actress, playwright, and screenwriter
- Virginie Greiner (born 1969), comic book scriptwriter
- Henry Gréville, pen name of Alice Durand (1842–1902), widely translated novelist
- Benoîte Groult (1920–2016), novelist and feminist
- Claudine Guérin de Tencin (1682–1749), literary patron, novelist, and correspondent
- Pernette du Guillet (c. 1520–1545), poet, most of whose works were intended to be set to music

== H ==
- Béatrice Hammer (born 1963), novelist, children's writer, and playwright
- Myriam Harry (1869–1958), significant pre-1914 writer, daughter of Moses Shapira
- Mireille Havet (1898–1932), poet, diarist, and novelist
- Nathalie Henneberg (1910–1977), science-fiction novelist
- Marie de Hennezel (born 1946), non-fiction writer
- Catherine Hermary-Vieille (born 1943), novelist
- Juliette Heuzey (1865–1952), novelist, biographer
- Adèle Hommaire de Hell (1819–1883), explorer and travel writer
- Violaine Huisman (born 1979), novelist, essayist, cultural journalist

== J ==
- Paula Jacques (born 1949), Egyptian-born French novelist, journalist, and radio host
- Martine L. Jacquot (born 1955), French-born Canadian academic, novelist, poet, short-story writer, and journalist
- Marie Jaffredo (born 1966), comics scriptwriter
- Gaëlle Josse (born 1960), poet and novelist
- Alice Jouenne (1873–1954), French educator, socialist activist, and writer

== K ==
- Fabienne Kanor (born 1970), journalist, novelist, and filmmaker
- Maylis de Kerangal (born 1967), novelist
- Kiyémis (born 1993), poet, Afro-feminist
- Nadia Yala Kisukidi (born 1978), philosopher
- Thérèse Kuoh-Moukouri (born 1938), Cameroon-born French novelist and essayist

== L ==
- Jean de La Brète (1858–1945), novelist
- Anne-Marie Lacroix (1732–1802), French writer
- Anne de La Roche-Guilhem (1644–1710), novelist, moved to England
- Sylvie Lainé (born 1957), science-fiction novelist and short-story writer
- Claire Lalouette, French Egyptologist
- Jeanne Lapauze (1860–1920), born Jeanne Loiseau, poet and novelist, who used the pen name Daniel Lesueur
- Oriane Lassus (born 1987), author, cartoonist, illustrator
- Camille Laurens (born 1957), novelist
- Caroline Laurent (born 1988), novelist, memoirist and editor
- Linda Lê (1963–2022), Vietnamese-born French novelist
- Simone Le Bargy (1877–1985), actress, novelist, and memoirist
- Martine Le Coz (born 1955), novelist, poet, and non-fiction writer
- Violette Leduc (1907–1972), novelist and autobiographer
- Lucie Leiciague (1880–1962), French communist and writer
- Marie Léopold-Lacour (1859–1942), feminist activist, writer, and storyteller
- Jeanne-Marie Leprince de Beaumont (1711–1780), novelist and fairy-tale writer, author of Beauty and the Beast
- Marie Léra (1864–1958), journalist, novelist, and translator
- Michèle Lesbre (born 1939), writer and novelist
- Marguerite de Lussan (1682–1758), historical novelist
- Grace Ly (born 1979), writer, podcaster, feminist

== M ==
- Lisa Mandel (born 1977), comics scriptwriter
- Jeanne Marni (1854–1910), novelist, playwright, and essayist
- Anne de Marquets (c. 1533–1588), religious poet, nun, and author of Les Sonets spirituels
- Agnès Martin-Lugand (born 1979), novelist
- Margaret Maruani (1954–2022), non-fiction writer
- Sophie Massieu (born 1975), journalist
- Renée Massip (1907–2002), novelist, journalist
- Nicole-Claude Mathieu (1937–2014), sociologist specializing in gender studies
- Claire-Marie Mazarelli de Saint-Chamond (1731–unknown), woman of letters, writer
- Diane Mazloum (born 1980), French-Lebanese writer
- Meavenn, pen name of Francine Rozec (1911–1992), Breton-language poet, novelist, and playwright
- Natacha Michel (born 1941), political activist, novelist, and critic
- Hélène Miard-Delacroix (born 1959), historian, Germanist, professor
- Marijane Minaberri (1926–2017), children's author, poet, and short-story writer
- Jane Misme (1865–1935), journalist and feminist
- Ursule Molinaro (1916–2000), French-American novelist, playwright, and translator, who wrote in French and English
- Kenizé Mourad (born 1939), journalist, non-fiction writer, and novelist

== N ==
- Claire Julie de Nanteuil (1834–1897), children's literature writer
- Marguerite de Navarre (1492–1549), poet, playwright, and short-story writer, including the collection Heptaméron
- Marie NDiaye (born 1967), novelist and playwright
- Anaïs Nin (1903–1977), diarist, essayist, novelist, and short story writer
- Anna de Noailles (1876–1933), highly acclaimed novelist, poet, and autobiographer
- Florence Noiville (born 1961), journalist, children's writer, novelist, and non-fiction writer

== O ==
- Véronique Olmi (born 1962), novelist, playwright, and short-story writer
- Mona Ozouf (born 1931), historian and philosopher

== P ==
- Katherine Pancol (born 1954), novelist, journalist, and author of Les Yeux jaunes des crocodiles (The Yellow Eyes of Crocodiles)
- Ève Paul-Margueritte (1885–1971), novelist
- Lucie Paul-Margueritte (1886–1955), writer and translator
- Madeleine Pelletier (1874–1939), feminist writer
- Gabrielle Petit (feminist) (1860–1952), newspaper editor
- Michelle Perrot (born 18 May 1928, Paris), historian, feminist, and grand officer of the legion of honor
- Georges de Peyrebrune (1841–1917), prolific novelist, columnist, and feminist
- Louise Pioger (1848–1920), anarchist, nursery rhymes
- Anne Plichota (born 1968), children's writer and novelist
- Maria Pognon (1844–1925), writer, journal editor, feminist, suffragist, and pacifist
- Aliénor de Poitiers (15th century), writer on court etiquette
- Renada-Laura Portet (1927–2021), poet, prose writer, non-fiction writer
- Alice Poulleau (1885–1960), travel writer and geographer

== R ==
- Rachilde, pen name of Marguerite Vallette-Eymery (1860–1953), novelist and non-fiction writer, author of Monsieur Vénus
- Geneviève-Françoise Randon de Malboissière (1746–1766), playwright, poet, and multi-lingual translator
- Fanny Raoul (1771–1833), feminist writer, journalist, philosopher, and essayist
- Pauline Réage, pen-name of Anne Desclos (1907–1998), who also used the pen-name Dominique Aury, novelist, editor, critic, and author of Story of O (Histoire d'O)
- Marie Redonnet, pen name of Martine L'hospitalier (born 1948), poet, novelist, essayist, short-story writer, and playwright
- Christine Renard (1929–1979), science-fiction novelist
- Juliette Rennes (born 1976), sociologist and non-fiction writer
- Gabrielle Réval (1869–1938), novelist and essayist
- Sandrine Revel (born 1969), comics illustrator and author
- Yasmina Reza (born 1959), playwright, novelist, actress, screenwriter, and author of God of Carnage
- Nadine Ribault (1964–2021), novelist, short-story writer, and translator
- Marie Jeanne Riccoboni (1714–1792), novelist and editor
- Catherine Rihoit (born 1950), novelist and biographer
- Christiane Rimbaud (1944–2023), historian
- Blandine Rinkel (born 1991), novelist
- Christine de Rivoyre (1921–2019), novelist and journalist
- Antoinette Henriette Clémence Robert (1797–1872), novelist and playwright
- Nina Roberts (born 1979), erotic novelist and actress
- Tatiana de Rosnay (born 1961), journalist, novelist, and screenwriter
- Marie-Anne de Roumier-Robert (1705–1771), early science-fiction novelist
- Pascale Roze (born 1954), playwright and novelist, author of Sarah's Key (Elle s'appelait Sarah)
- Léonie Rouzade (1839–1916), journalist, novelist, and feminist

== S ==
- Françoise Sagan (1935–2004), playwright, novelist, and screenwriter, author of Bonjour Tristesse
- Catherine Dorothée de Saint-Pierre (1743–?), letter writer
- Vefa de Saint-Pierre (1872–1967), explorer, reporter, Breton-language poet, and children's writer
- Lydie Salvayre (born 1948), novelist, widely translated
- George Sand (1804–1876), novelist and playwright, author of Indiana
- Anne de Seguier, 16th-century French poet and salon-holder
- Nathalie Sarraute (1900–1999), Russian-born French novelist, who pioneered the nouveau roman
- Albertine Sarrazin (1937–1967), French-Algerian novelist, essayist, and poet
- Johanna Schipper (known as "Johanna"; born 1967), Taiwanese-born French comics artist and short-story writer
- Ariane Schréder, novelist
- Simone Schwarz-Bart (born 1938), Guadeloupean-French novelist, playwright, and non-fiction writer
- Ann Scott (born 1965), novelist, short-story writer
- Madeleine de Scudéry (1607–1701), novelist, works containing lengthy conversations
- Countess of Ségur (1799–1874), Russian-born French novelist and children's writer
- Eulalie de Senancour (1791–1876), journalist, novelist, and children's writer
- Coline Serreau (born 1947), actress, film director, playwright, and essayist
- Marie de Rabutin-Chantal, marquise de Sévigné (1626–1696), correspondent
- Shan Sa, pen name of Yan Ni (born 1972), Chinese-born French poet, novelist, and painter, now writing in French
- Valérie Simonin (1831–1919), novelist
- Maboula Soumahoro (born 1976), scholar, Afro-feminist
- Gabrielle Soumet (1814–1886), dramatist, poet, and feminist writer
- Audrey Spiry (born 1983), animator, illustrator, and bande dessinée author
- Germaine de Staël, also Madame de Staël (1766–1817), essayist, novelist, non-fiction writer, and salonnière
- Louise Swanton Belloc (1796–1881), translator, essayist, novelist, non-fiction writer, children's book writer, and feminist

== T ==
- Tibors de Sarenom (12th century), troubadour poet, writing in Occitan
- Marie-Louise Tenèze (1922–2016), ethnologist, folklorist
- Françoise Thébaud (born 1952), historian and professor emeritus
- Françoise Thom (born 1951), historian and Sovietologist
- Chantal Thomas (born 1945), historian and novelist
- Édith Thomas (1909–1970), novelist, historian, and journalist
- Gilles Thomas, pen name of Éliane Taïeb (1929–1985), science-fiction novelist
- Annette Tison (1942–2010), architect, children's writer, and co-creator of Barbapapa
- Valerie Toranian (born 1962), journalist and editor of Elle
- Nicole Tourneur (1950–2011), novelist and children's writer
- Elsa Triolet (1896–1970), Russian-born French novelist, first women to win the Prix Goncourt, wrote in Russian and French
- Nadine Trintignant (born 1934), film editor, writer, director, producer, and novelist
- Flora Tristan (1803–1844), socialist writer and feminist

== V ==
- Valérie Valère (1961–1981), autobiographical novelist
- Fred Vargas, pen name of Frédérique Audoin-Rouzeau (born 1957), crime fiction writer and historian
- Delphine de Vigan (born 1966), novelist and author of No et moi, translated into 20 languages
- Marie-Catherine de Villedieu (1640–1683), playwright, novelist, and short-story writer
- Gabrielle-Suzanne Barbot de Villeneuve (c. 1695–1755), novelist, fairy-tale writer, and author of Belle et la Bête
- Louise Lévêque de Vilmorin (1902–1969), novelist, poet, and journalist
- Renée Vivien (1877–1909), British-born French-language poet, often writing autobiographical verse
- Élisabeth Vonarburg (born 1947), science-fiction novelist

== W ==
- Chloé Wary (born 1995), comics writer
- Simone Weil (1909–1943), philosopher and non-fiction writer
- Anne Wiazemsky (1947–2017), German-born French novelist and actress
- Joëlle Wintrebert (born 1949), science-fiction novelist and children's writer
- Monique Wittig (1935–2003), novelist, playwright, and feminist writer
- Cendrine Wolf (born 1969), children's writer, who collaborates with Anne Plichota

== Y ==
- Marguerite Yourcenar (1903–1987), novelist and essayist

== Z ==
- Léontine Zanta (1872–1942), novelist and feminist

== See also ==
- List of French-language authors
- List of women writers
