= Jaffredo =

Jaffredo is a surname of French origin. Notable people with the surname include:

- Lionel Jaffredo (born 1970), French football referee
- Marie Jaffredo (born 1966), French comics artist
- Martial Jaffredo (born 1976), former ice dancer who represented France
