= Catherine Enjolet =

French novelist and essayist

Catherine Enjolet (born in Paris) is a French novelist and essayist.

== Biography ==
Enjolet is an author and a full professor of French literature. She formerly taught communication and cultural studies in the United States as well as at the Sorbonne in Paris, France. She is also a screenwriter and director, she was contracted by the INA (National Institute for Broadcasting) to study the relationships between literature and broadcasting in France. In 1990, Enjolet created the non-governmental organization Parrains Par Mille, which organizes voluntary sponsorship for isolated children "next door", to enable them to receive educational and emotional support.

== Literature prizes ==
- Sélection des Lectrices de ELLE - 1997
- Prix Georges Brassens - 1995
- Prix du Jeune Cinéma Français - 1980

== Awards ==
- Chevalier des Arts et Lettres - 2015 (Officer of arts and letters)
- Chevalier de la légion d'honneur - 2008 (Officer of legend and Honor)
- Prix Figaro Humanitaire - 2005
- Prix Trofémina - 2005
- Prix Entreprise Citoyenne du Monde - CLARINS - 2004
- Prix Radio France - 1995

== Novels ==
- Rousse comme personne, Stock, 1990 (prix Georges Brassens)
- Princesse d'ailleurs, Éditions Phébus, 1997
- Mémoires d'enfance, Phébus, short stories (collective work), 2008
- Under Silence, Phébus, 2012, French Academy Creation Prize
- Under Shadows, Phébus, 2014, Paris Literature Prize
- Nina, Ed Lattes, 2016

== Essays ==
- En danger de silence, Robert Laffont, 1999
- L'amour et ses chemins, Pocket, with Jacques Salomé, 2000
- Les liens du sens, Ramsay, 2003
- Ceux qui ne savent pas donner ne savent pas ce qu'ils perdent, JC Lattès, 2006
- Conversations solidaires, édition Rue de L'Echiquier, 2009

. Defense for Affective Adoption ed Pocket 2011

== Album ==
- Une étoile pour chacun, Belin, 2006

== Member of jury ==
- 'Member of literary book award'
- 'Member of PARIS' book award
- 'Présidente of Morocco literary Prize'
- 'Presidente of international literary Escapes et conferences - Le Figaro Newspaper'
- Member of jury of le literary Summer Novel Prize
