= Geneviève Aclocque =

French historian (1884–1967)

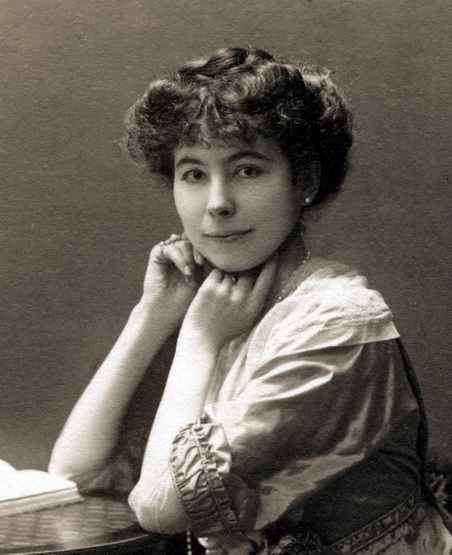
- Geneviève Aclocque in 1913
- Born: Léopoldine Marcelle Geneviève Aclocque; May 5, 1884; Lyon, France
- Died: August 28, 1967 (aged 83); Saint-Antoine-du-Rocher, France
- Education: Archivist-paleography, École Nationale des Chartes (1910)

Geneviève Aclocque (Léopoldine Marcelle Geneviève Aclocque) (5 May 1884 - 28 August 1967) was a French historian.

== Biography ==
Geneviève Aclocque was born on 5 May 1884 in Lyon. In 1906, She became the first woman to be admitted to the École Nationale des Chartes. She graduated in 1910.

In 1917 she published a “historical study of the trades at Chartres.” An ordinance of wool makers at Chartres allowed women to participate in trade. According to Aclocque, the early stages of wool production were undertaken by the male workers, while the spinning was done by women using distaffs. There was also a practice in which the master weavers of wool at Chartres could teach their heirs, male or female, to replace them as masters of the trade.

Her studies also revealed links between trade practices and certain religious rituals. Further her publications claim that in order to avoid even a reduced tax, the tavern keepers sold their wine in Chartres' nave.

She was married to historian Joseph de Croy. She died on 28 August 1967 in Saint-Antoine-du-Rocher.

== Publications ==
- Études sur le commerce et l'industrie à Chartres depuis le XI^{e} siècle jusqu'à la fin du ministère de Colbert : thèse, Abbeville, imprimerie F. Paillart 1910.
- Les corporations, l'industrie et le commerce à Chartres, du XI^{e} siècle à la Révolution, Paris : éditions Picard, 1917, réédité par B. Franklin, New York 1967.
- André-Arnoult Aclocque, commandant général de la garde nationale parisienne, 1748-1802 : un défenseur du roi, Paris : A. et J. Picard, 1947.
- Un épisode sur la presse clandestine au temps de Madame de Pompadour, Paris Clavreuil, 1963.
