= Louis Figuier =

French scientist and writer

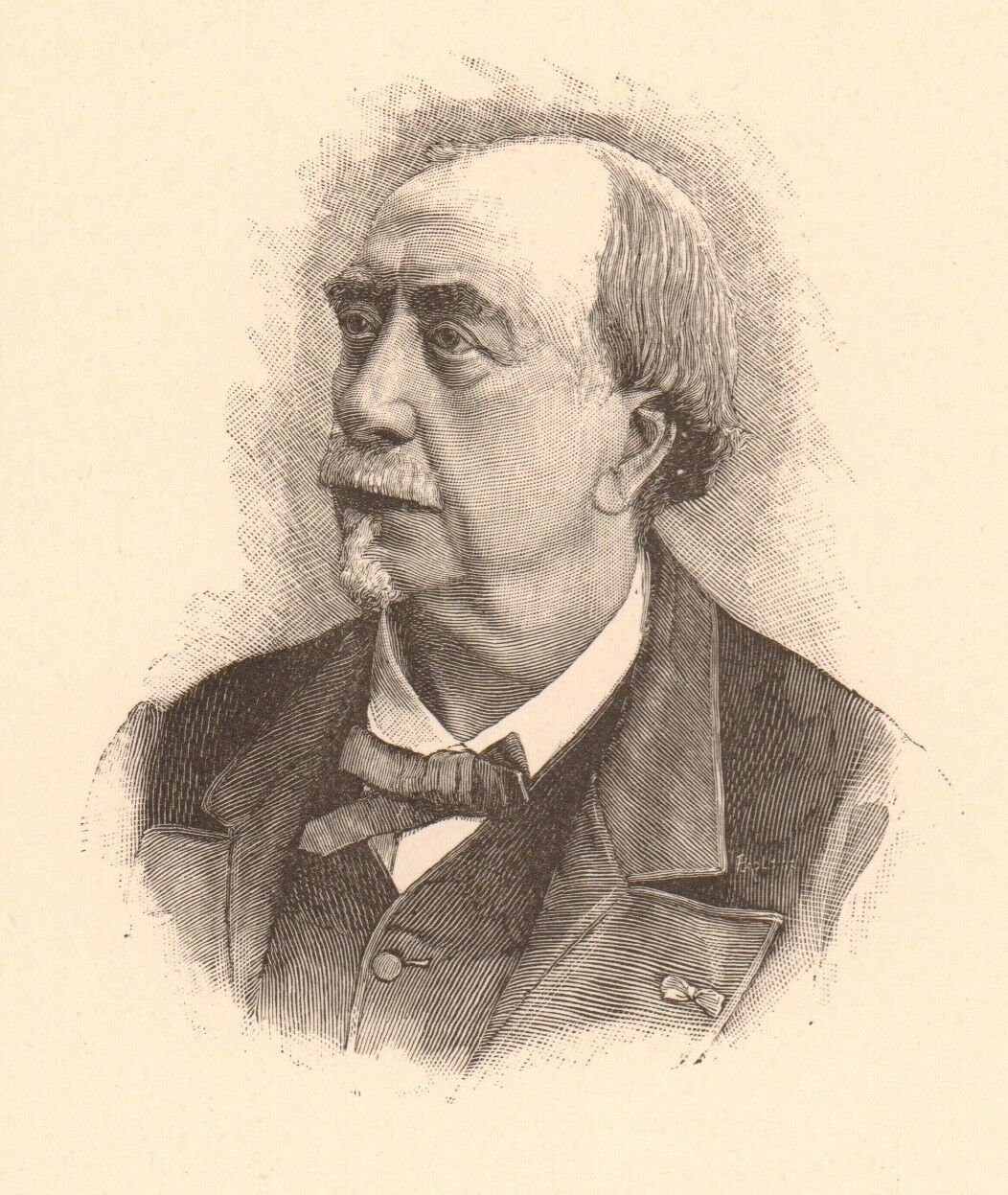
Louis Figuier

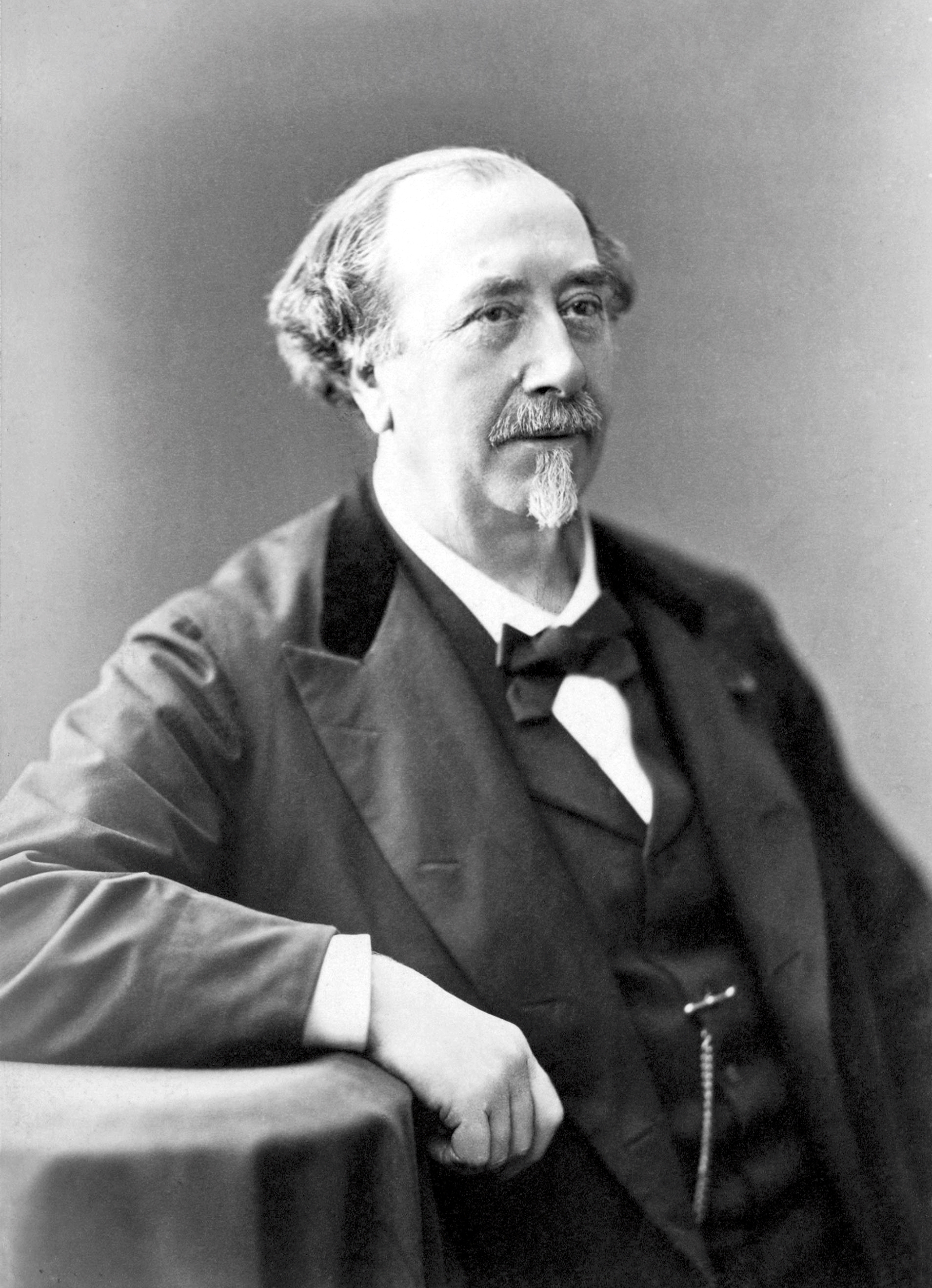
Figuier in a photograph by Nadar

Louis Figuier (French pronunciation: [lwi fiɡje]; 15 February 1819 in Montpellier – 8 November 1894 in 9th arrondissement of Paris) was a French scientist and writer. He was the nephew of Pierre-Oscar Figuier and professor of chemistry at the École de pharmacie of Montpellier. Louis Figuier was married to French writer Louise Juliette Bouscaren.

== Career ==
Figuier became Doctor of Medicine (1841), agrégé of pharmacology, chemistry (1844–1853) and physics and gained his PhD in (1850). Figuier was appointed professor at the École de Pharmacie of Paris after leaving Montpellier. In his research he found himself opposed to Claude Bernard; as a result of this conflict, he abandoned his research to devote himself to popular science. He edited and published a yearbook from 1857 to 1894 – L'Année scientifique et industrielle (or Exposé annuel des travaux) – in which he compiled an inventory of the scientific discoveries of the year (it was continued after his death until 1914). He was the author of numerous successful works: Les Grandes inventions anciennes et modernes (1861), Le Savant du foyer (1862), La Terre avant le déluge (1863) illustrated by Édouard Riou, La Terre et les mers (1864), Les Merveilles de la science (1867–1891).

He wrote extensively on the subject of photography, including it in his study on the marvels of nineteenth-century science, and also writing a self-standing book on the subject.

Influenced by Charles Lyell's Geological Evidences of the Antiquity of Man of 1863, the 1867 second edition of La Terre avant le déluge abandoned the Garden of Eden shown in the first edition, and included dramatic illustrations of savage men and women wearing animal skins and wielding stone axes.

== Main works ==
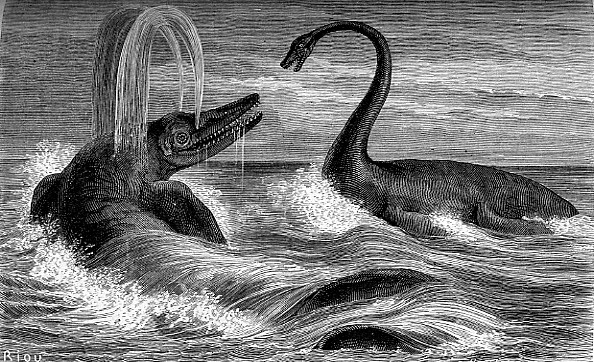
Illustration from La Terre avant le déluge

- La Terre avant le déluge, 1863, 2nd. edition 1867
  - English translation, World Before the Deluge, 1865
  - Swedish translation by Carl Hartman, Jorden före syndafloden, 1868, based on the 5th French edition
- Vies des savants illustres de l'antiquité (Lives of the Illustrious Scholars of Antiquity), 1866
- Vies des savants illustres du Moyen âge (Lives of the Illustrious Scholars of the Middle Ages), 1867
- The Vegetable World, 1867
- Vies des savants illustres de la Renaissance [Lives of the Illustrious Scholars of the Renaissance]. 1868.
1. Via Internet Archive (Internet Archive).
- The Ocean World, 1868
- The Insect World, 1868
- Reptiles and Birds, 1869
- Vies des savants illustres du XVIIe siècle (Lives of the Illustrious Scholars of the 17th century), 1869
- Vies des savants illustres du XVIIIe siècle (Lives of the Illustrious Scholars of the 18th century), 1870
- Primitive Man, 1871
- The human race, 1872
- La Photographie, 1889
- Les merveilles de la science ou description populaire des inventions modernes [The Wonders of Science or Descriptions of Popular Modern Inventions] (1867–1891; 4 Vols. and 2 Supplement Vols.). Paris: Libraire Furne, Jouvet et Cⁱᵉ, éditeurs. Corbeil: Imprimerie Crêté. OCLC 1120244135 (all editions), 716844343, 457972881, and 896988001.
1. 'Vol. 1: "Machine à vapeur – bateau à vapeur – locomotive et chemins de fer – locomobiles – machine électrique – paratonnerres – pile de Volta – électro-magnétisme".
  1. Via BnF (Gallica).
  2. Via BnF (Gallica).
2. Vol. 2: "Télégraphie aérienne, électrique et sous-marine — câble transatlantique — galvanoplastie — dorure et argenture — électro-chimiques — aérostats — éthérisation". 1868.
  1. Via Google Books (UCLA).
3. Vol. 3: "Photographie — stéréoscope — poudres de guerre — artillerie ancienne et moderne — armes à feu portatives — bâtiments – cuirassés — drainage — pisciculture".
  1. Via Internet Archive (Internet Archive).
4. Vol. 4: "Éclairage — chauffage — ventilation — phares — puits artésiens — cloche à plonger — moteur à gaz — aluminium — planète Neptune". 1870.
  1. Via Internet Archive (Getty Research Institute).
5. Supplément 1 : "À la machine à vapeur – aux bateaux à vapeur — à la locomotive et aux chemins de fer — aux locomobiles — au paratonnerre — à la pile de Volta – à l'électro-magnétisme et aux machines à courant d'induction — au moteur électrique — à la galvanoplastie et aux dépôts électro-chimiques — au télégraphe aérien (télégraphie optique et télégraphie pneumatique) — au télégraphe électrique — à la télégraphie sous-marine et au câble Atlantique — aux aérostats". [Supplement 1 (translation'): To the Steam Engine — To the Steamships — To the Locomotive and to the Railways — To the Locomobiles — To the Lightning Rod — To Volta's Pile — To Electromagnetism and to Induction Current Machines — To the Electric Motor — To Electroplating and to Electrochemical Deposits — To the Aerial Telegraph (Optical Telegraphy and Pneumatic Telegraphy) — To the Electric Telegraph — To Submarine Telegraphy and the Atlantic Cable — To the Aerostats (Balloons)]. p. 621. OCLC 492631961 and 496282335.
  1. Via HathiTrust.
  2. Via Internet Archive.
6. Supplément 2 : À la photographie — aux poudres de guerre — à l'artillerie moderne — aux armes à feu portatives — aux bâtiments cuirassés — a l'art de l'éclairage — à l'art du chauffage — au moteur à gaz aux phares — le phonographe. [Supplement 2 (translation): To Photography — To Gunpowder — To Modern Artillery — To Portable Firearms — To Armored Ships — To the Art of Lighting — To the Art of Heating — To the Gas Engine — To Lighthouses — The Phonograph.
  1. Via Internet Archive (Wellcome Library).
