= Jeanne-Justine Fouqueau de Pussy =

French author

Jeanne-Justine Fouqueau de Pussy (1786–1863) was a French author.

She specialized in writing children's books. She was active in the field of educational literature. She is known as the founder of the girls' magazine Journal des Demoiselles (1833–1922). She functioned as the director of the Journal des Demoiselles from 1833 to 1852. The magazine was educational and focused on a number of subjects such as fashion, geography, history, moral and sports.
