= Juliette Figuier =

French playwright and novelist

Louise Juliette Bouscaren, known as Juliette Figuier (4 February 1827, Montpellier – 6 December 1879, Paris), was a French playwright and novelist. She also published some works under the pseudonym Claire Sénart. She was the wife of Louis Figuier.

== Selected works ==
- La Femme avant le déluge (1889)
- Le gardian de la Camargue (1889)
- Le Premier voyage aérien (1889)
- Cherchez la fraise (1889)
- Le Mariage de Franklin (1889)
- Le Sang du Turco (1889)
- Le Jardin de Trianon (1889)
- Le Presbytère (1888)
- La Fraise (1878)
- Les Deux carnets (1877)
- Barbe d'or (1876)
- La Dame aux lilas blancs (1875)
- Les Pilules de M. Brancolar (1874)
- Le Pied-à-terre (1874)
- L'Enfant (1874)
- La Parisienne (1873)
- La Vie brûlée (1873)
- Gutenberg (1869)
- L'Italie d'après nature (1868)
- Scènes et souvenirs du Languedoc. La Prédicante des Cévennes (1864)
- Le Gardian de la Camargue (1862)
- Les Soeurs de lait (1861)
- Nouvelles languedociennes (1860)
- Mos de Lavène (1859)
