= Marie Jaffredo =

French comics artist (born 1966)

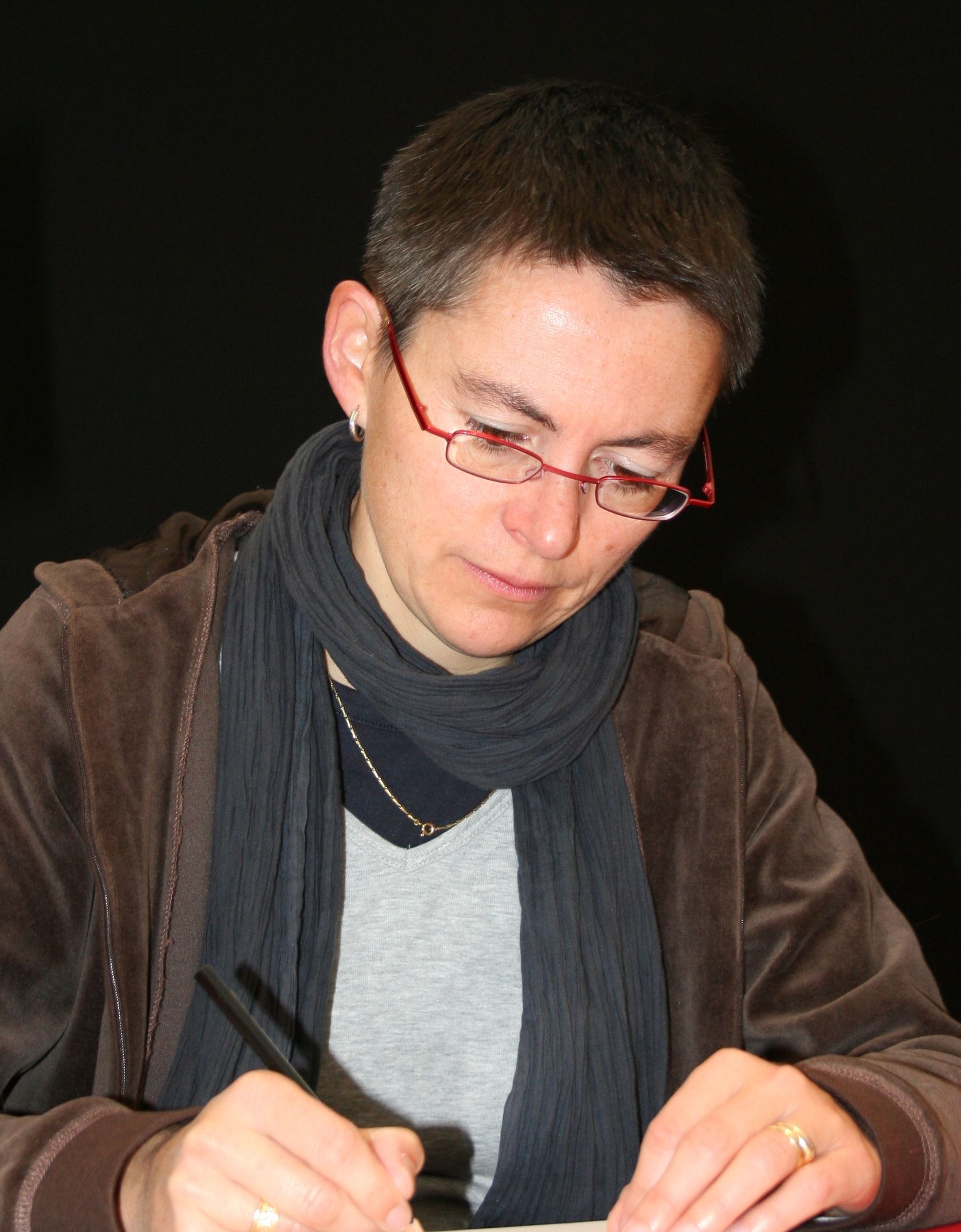
- Marie Jaffredo at the comic festival Quai des Bulles in 2008
- Born: 12 October 1966 (age 60) Caen, France
- Areas: Cartoonist, Writer, Artist, Colourist
- Collaborators: Michaël Le Galli

Marie Jaffredo (born 12 October 1966 in Caen) is a French comics artist of Breton and Norman origin.

With scripts by Michaël Le Galli, Jaffredo creates dark and anguishing stories like the series Les Démons de Marie (dealing with madness), the series Le Sang des bâtisseurs (a medieval thriller), or the album Les Damnés de Paris (the clouds which accumulate on a Paris of before the war of 1870, of before the Commune of 1871). As a writer-drafter, Jaffredo tackles the village chronicle with Et si... and the course of adoption in China with Yuan: journal d'une adoption.

== Biography ==
As a child, Jaffredo read the classic comics: The Adventures of Tintin, Lucky Luke, Asterix, Boule et Bill, Spirou & Fantasio, Gaston, and Les Petits Hommes. She drew a lot, without thinking of making it her profession.

From 1985 to 1991, Jaffredo was a student at the École nationale supérieure d'architecture de Normandie, in Darnétal. In 1991, after graduating, she moved to Brussels, where she worked as an architect and then as an urban planner.

In 2000, back in Caen, Jaffredo returned to comics. She collaborates with the local fanzines Bol d'encre and Bulle de gomme. In 2001, she made her professional debut with the Norman publisher that publishes comics Petit à Petit, providing short stories (from three to ten pages) for collective albums. For the first of these albums, Édith Piaf en bandes dessinées, Jaffredo worked with the scriptwriter Michaël Le Galli. Over the years, she contributed to five other "Petit à Petit" albums, devoted to Verlaine, Bourvil, Louise Attaque, Grimm, and Maupassant.

Le Galli and Jaffredo reunited for an adventure story about the care of madness, Les Démons de Marie: "A cloudy and windy island, a mess of madmen, a priest, some innocent children, a strong and dark story...". This series of two albums was published by Carabas in 2004 and 2005.

In 2003, Jaffredo moved to the hillsides of the Lyonnais. The region and its inhabitants inspired her to write a village chronicle of the 1960s, mixed with a family secret. At the end of 2006, she embarked on her first scriptwriting experience. She sought the advice of scriptwriter Olivier Jouvray, who reviewed her text and guided her. The whole work on the album (writing, drawing, and coloring) took her a year and a half. She was lucky; the publisher Vents d'Ouest was about to launch "Terres d'origine", a collection that would honor the regions of France. Et si... was published in this collection in 2008.

In 2009, Jaffredo joined "La fourmilière BD", a small publishing house in Lyon. She published Les Pop Korn: dur, dur la vie de famille! In 2010, she participated in the collective album Les Inventions de la vie moderne for the same publisher.

Jaffredo worked again with Le Galli for a medieval thriller, the series Le Sang des bâtisseurs (two albums), whose volume 1 was released in 2010 by Vents d'Ouest: "An abbey under construction, macchabees gutted willy-nilly, the cold, a young woman of character, visions of horror, in short, an agonizing atmosphere as she likes them!" In 2014, she published Les Damnés de Paris, based on a script by Le Galli, published by Vents d'Ouest. The story takes "from the slums and shady and noisy inns to the beautiful neighborhoods, to the worldly and artistic Paris through the country island of the Montmartre hill", the Paris that Hausmann's works metamorphose is that of writers and impressionists, but also a city on the brink of collapse, just before the decline of the Second Empire, the 1870 war, and the Commune.

In 2015, Jaffredo published a comic book thriller, Meurtre au Mont-Saint-Michel, based on a script by Djian (comic book author), co-published by Glénat Editions and Editions du Patrimoine. In 2017, in Édouard Manet et Berthe Morisot: une passion impressionniste, published by Glénat, Jaffredo illustrates on a script by Le Galli the beginnings of the two painters, their relationship, and society at the end of the Second French Empire. Returning to scriptwriting for an autobiographical story, Jaffredo evokes the adoption of her daughter and the discovery of China, her daughter's country of origin, in Yuan : journal d'une adoption,, published by Vent d'Ouest in October 2019.

== Selected works ==
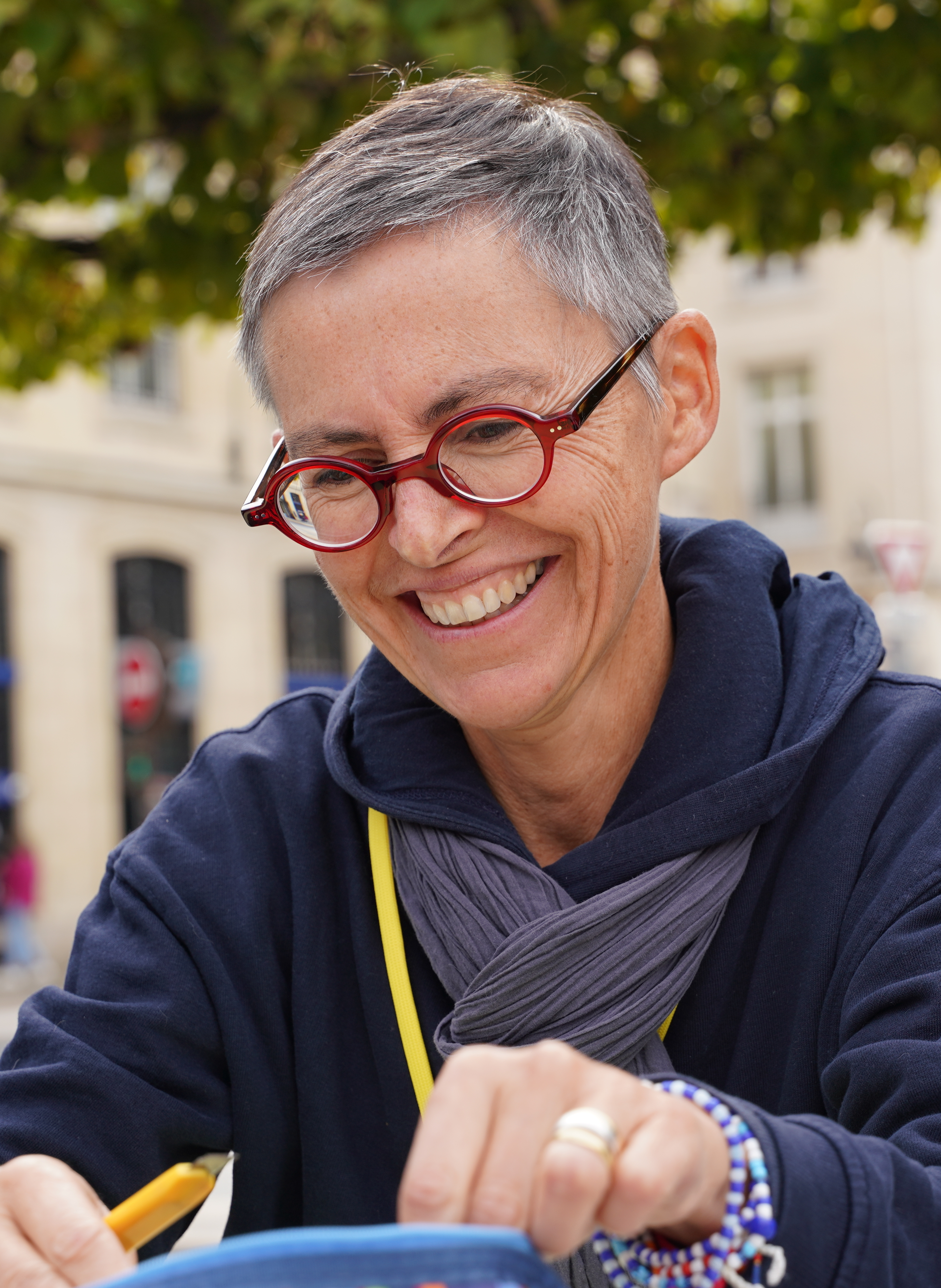
(2022)

- Drawing, with Michaël Le Galli (scriptwriter), contribution to the collective album Édith Piaf en bandes dessinées, Darnétal, Petit à Petit, 2001.
- Drawing, contribution to the collective album Poèmes de Verlaine en bandes dessinées, collection "Littérature en bandes dessinées", Petit à Petit, 2003.
- Drawing, contribution to the collective album Chansons de Bourvil en bandes dessinées, collection "Chansons en bandes dessinées", Petit à Petit, 2003.
- Drawing, with Michaël Le Galli (scriptwriter), series Les Démons de Marie, collection "Époques", Paris, Carabas-Tournon :
  1. L'Expérience du professeur Mesmer, 2004
  2. La Rédemption du père Anselme, 2005
- Drawing, contribution to the collective album Les Chansons de Louise Attaque en bandes dessinées, collection "Chansons en bandes dessinées », Petit à Petit, 2006.
- Drawing, contribution to the collective album Contes de Grimm en bandes dessinées, collection "Littérature en bandes dessinées", Petit à Petit, 2007.
- Drawing, contribution to the collective album Contes de Guy de Maupassant en bandes dessinées, collection "Littérature en bandes dessinées », Petit à Petit, 2007.
- Scriptwriter, drawing, colorist, Et si : au cœur des coteaux lyonnais, collection "Terres d'origine", Vents d'Ouest, 2008.
- Scriptwriter, drawing, colorist, series Les Pop Korn, collection "3 cases", Villeurbanne, La fourmilière BD:
  1. Dur, dur, la vie de famille ! 2009.
- Participation in the collective album Les Inventions de la vie moderne, La fourmilière BD, 2010.
- Illustrations, in Béatrix de L'Aulnoit & Philippe Alexandre (text), Des fourchettes dans les étoiles: brève histoire de la gastronomie française, Fayard, 2010.
- Illustrations, in Philippe Cavalier (text), Une promenade magique dans Paris: avec les initiés, les sorciers et les alchimistes, l'itinéraire secret du vieux Paris, Anne Carrière, 2010.
- Drawing, colorist, with Michaël Le Galli (scriptwriter), series Le Sang des bâtisseurs, collection "Fantastique", Vents d'Ouest :
  - volume 1, 2010
  - volume 2, 2011
- Drawing, with Michaël Le Galli (scriptwriter), Les Damnés de Paris, Vents d'Ouest, 2014.
- Drawing, with Djian (scriptwriter), Meurtre au Mont-Saint-Michel, Glénat, Patrimoine, 2015.
- Drawing, colorist, with Michaël Le Galli (scriptwriter), Édouard Manet et Berthe Morisot: une passion impressionniste, Glénat, 2017.
- Scriptwriter, drawing, colorist, Yuan: journal d'une adoption, Vent d'Ouest, 2019.
