= Louise Bourbonnaud =

French philanthropist, explorer, writer

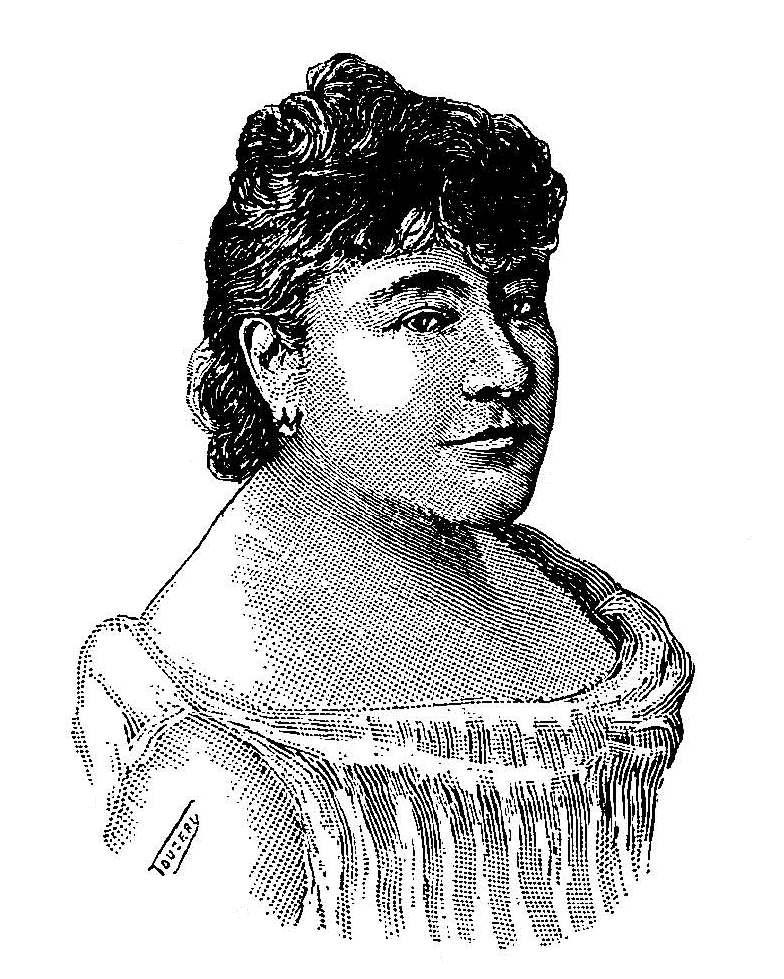
- Engraving of Louise Bourbonnaud
- Born: Louise Cosseron c. 1847; Paris
- Died: 19 March 1915; Paris
- Burial place: Père Lachaise Cemetery
- Occupations: Philanthropist, writer, explorer
- Spouse: Étienne Bourbonnaud

Louise Cosseron Bourbonnaud was born in Paris (c. 1847–1915) and was a French writer, explorer and philanthropist. who helped found the Relief Society for the Wounded of the Land and Sea Armies, which went on to become the French Red Cross. She also contributed to hospitals and a nursery in Paris.

== Biography ==
Louise Cosseron married the wealthy Parisian entrepreneur Étienne Bourbonnaud, who created the city's Boulevard Barbès with his friend, city urban planner Baron Haussmann and engineer Adolphe Alphand.

The Bourbonnaud couple used their fortune to provide assistance to residents of Paris. They faced the insurgents of the Commune in 1871 who attempted to seize their property during uprisings.

After Étienne died in 1875 at 48, Louise Bourbonnaud decided to continue her philanthropy and follow her passion for travel allowing her to discover and write about the world and its inhabitants.

=== Traveller ===
Beginning in the mid-1880s, Bourbonnaud undertook a series of extended journeys across several continents, travelling largely on her own at a time when long-distance travel by women without companions was still unusual. Her journeys took place during a period when a small number of European women, including Isabella Bird, Ida Pfeiffer and later Mary Kingsley, gained recognition for publishing accounts of independent travel.

Her first major tour took place in 1885, when she travelled through North America. The following year she visited Central America and the Caribbean, and in 1887 continued on to South America. During these journeys she sought out working-class communities whom she described as "the most humble people", recording observations about everyday life for publication after her return to Paris.

In 1888, Bourbonnaud embarked on a journey through Asia, visiting India, Sri Lanka, Borneo, Sumatra, Vietnam, China and Japan. In the following years she undertook additional journeys in Africa and Europe and returned to the Americas on further expeditions. In her writings she also described encounters with brigands and other dangers encountered along the routes she followed.

In her travel writings she made a point of contradicting prevailing social attitudes toward adventurous women. Writing about her decision to travel alone, she said:

How impressionable is woman's nature! The slightest thing upsets her, frightens her, makes her lose her head! How incomplete is her organization in sangfroid, presence of mind, and composure in the face of the hardships that life is filled with and which confront her at every step. What would she do without a man? How could she get along, poor thing? Well, I, a woman, wanted to show that those ideas enumerated above about women were getting very stale and out-of-date. Still young, in possession of a rather decent fortune, and a widow, that is to say, mistress of my actions, I set out upon my journey around the world.

=== Philanthropist ===
An eminent Parisian, Bourbonnaud often used her many friends with large socioeconomic resources to advocate for the most disadvantaged in the capital city. She financed (and co-financed) foundations, hospitals and a nursery, including in her neighborhood, the 18th arrondissement.

She actively participated in the founding of the Relief Society for the Wounded of the Land and Sea Armies, which later became known as the French Red Cross.

=== Exploration prize ===
She created the Louise Bourbonnaud Prize in 1891 and endowed it with the Société de Géographie de Paris. The prize was intended to reward great travelers of French origin, and it was given each year in her name.

- In 1892, the gold medal and prize money went to Henri Coudreau for his ten-year exploration of French Guiana from 1881-1891.
- In 1895, the award went to Father Élie Colin for his work in Madagascar.
- In 1906 The prize was awarded to Mr. R. Avelot.
- Marie Anne de Bovet also received the award, date unknown.

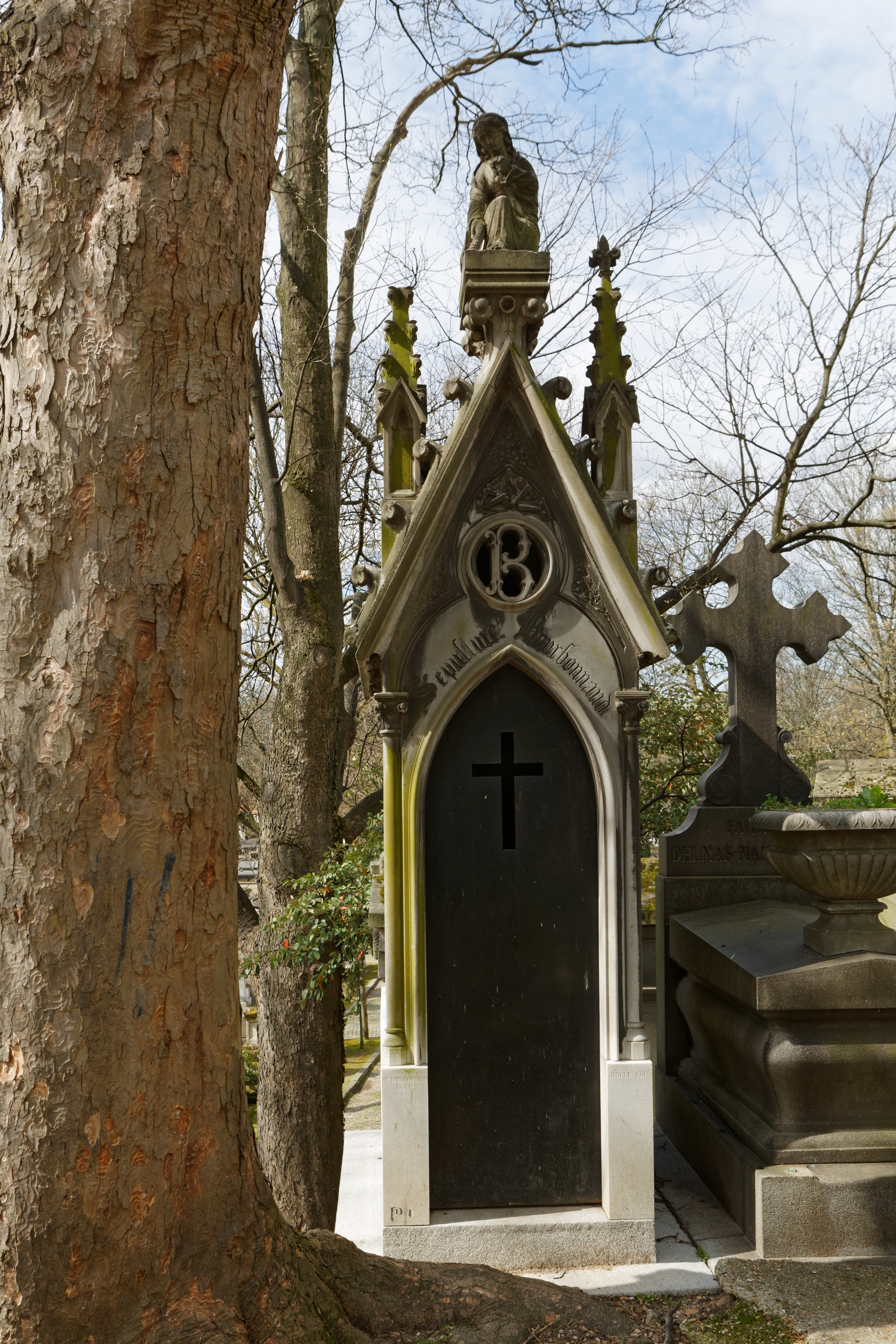
Gravesite of Louise Bourbonnaud and her husband in Père-Lachaise Cemetery, Paris.

=== Final years ===
She was honored by Gilbert Nabonnand with the naming of the “Louise-Bourbonnaud” tea rose, bred in 1892.

Bourbonnaud died 19 March 1915 at the age of 68 and is buried next to her husband in the Père-Lachaise Cemetery, in Paris (56th division).

== Works ==
Louise Bourbonnaud recounted her adventures in three books.

- Les Amériques: Amérique du nord, les Antilles, Amérique du sud. (Americas: North America, West Indies, South America) L. Vanier, 1889.
- India and the Far East, travel impressions of a Parisian woman, Paris, 1892
- Alone across 145,000 land, sea and air leagues, Paris.
