= Gerty Dambury =

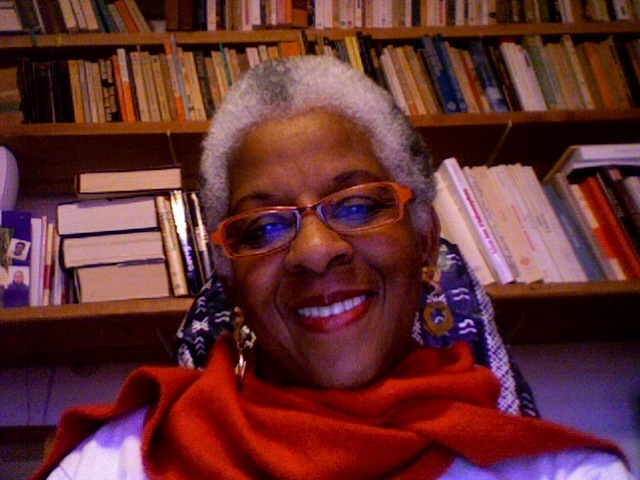
Gerty Dambury (2012)

Gerty Dambury (born 1957) is a writer, educator and theatre director from Guadeloupe. Since 1981, she has written several plays including Lettres indiennes (1996) translated as Crosscurrents (1997). Her first novel Les rétifs (2012) appeared in English as The Restless in 2018. It is centred on the police violence in French Guadeloupe in 1967. For her play Le rêve de William Alexander Brown, she was awarded the Prix Carbet de la Caraïbe et du Tout-Monde in 2015.

== Biography ==
Born on 27 February 1957 in Pointe-à-Pitre, Gert Dambury studied English and Arabic at Paris Vincennes University. She went on to study drama at Paris Nanterre University and at Paris Sorbonne Nouvelle University.

She first taught English in Guadeloupe and in the Paris region. In 1981, she began writing plays in French or Creole. Her most famous play, Lettres indiennes, comparing Martinique life for immigrants with that of Guadeloupe, was first performed in Avignon in 1996 and in English as Crosscurrents in New York in 1997. Her play Trames (2008), presented in English as Shades, was awarded the prize for drama by the Société des Auteurs et Compositeurs Dramatiques. In 2015, she received the Prix Carbet de la Caraïbe et du Tout-Monde for her play Le rêve de William Alexander Brown.

Dambury's first novel, Les rétifs, published in French in 2012, builds on the riots in Guadeloupe in May 1967 when the author was 10 years old. The character Emilienne appears to bear many similarities to Dambury herself. The novel was published in English as The Restless in 2018, attracting positive critical support.

== See also ==
- Kiyémis
