= Kiyémis =

French Afrofeminist blogger and poet (born 1993)

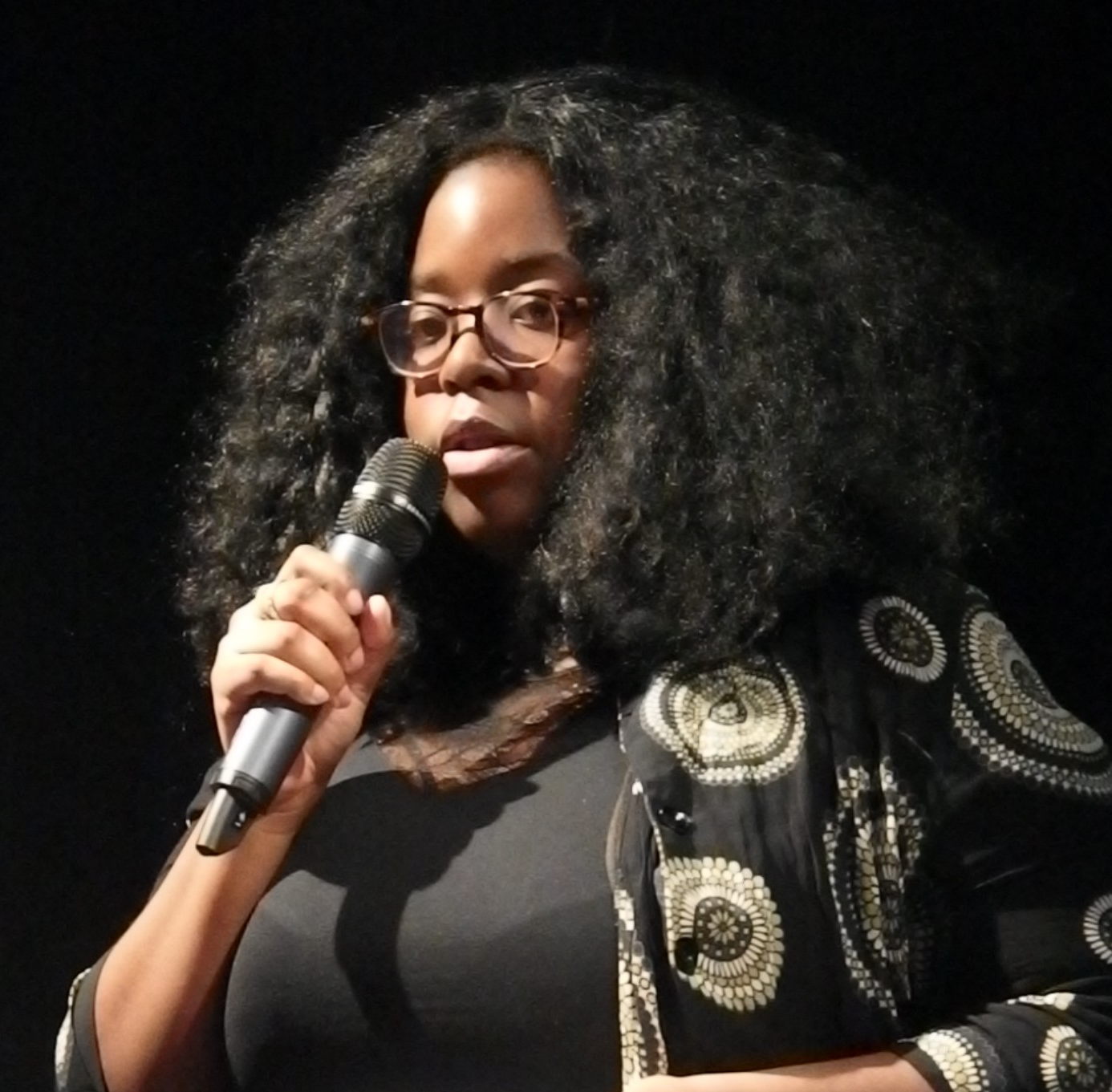
Kiyémis (2019)

Kiyémis (born 1993) is a militant French Afro-feminist, poet and lecturer. The name she uses is a pseudonym, combining the first name of her mother with that of her grandmother. Realizing during the 2005 French riots that the police were treating Black people differently from the native French, she became interested in supporting their rights. In 2012, while at university she began to contribute to Twitter and two years later launched her popular blog Les Bavardages de Kiyémis (Chat by Kiyémis). Her collection of poetry, À nos humanités révoltées (To Our Outraged Kinsfolk), was first published in Toulouse in 2018 and republished by Premiers Matins in 2020 with a supportive introduction by Gerty Dambury.

== Biography ==
Born in 1993 in the Paris area, Kiyémis was raised between Bobigny and Paris before moving to Lyon. She had a happy childhood with her Cameroon-born father, mother and grandmother, and her twin brother. From the age of 13, she realized that as a Black women, she was not being treated in the same way as the ethnic French. She first graduated in history and then earned a master's degree in political science.

In 2012, while studying history, she began to contribute to Twitter together with other young women interested in Afro-feminism. Encouraged by her mother, two years later she launched her blog, Les Bavardages de Kiyémis dealing with her personal writings, how black women fared at work and the lack of mixing between Blacks and Whites. While some expected her to write an essay on Afro-feminism, she responded by writing poetry. The small publishing house Métagraphes was so impressed with the verses she sent in that they encouraged her to publish a short collection. It appeared in March 2018 as A nos humanités révoltées, expressing her ideas on oppression and all the related struggles. It was republished by Premiers Matins in late 2020 with a preface by the Guadeloupian writer Gerty Dambury. It received positive reviews.
