= Philippe Alexandre =

French journalist and writer (1932–2022)

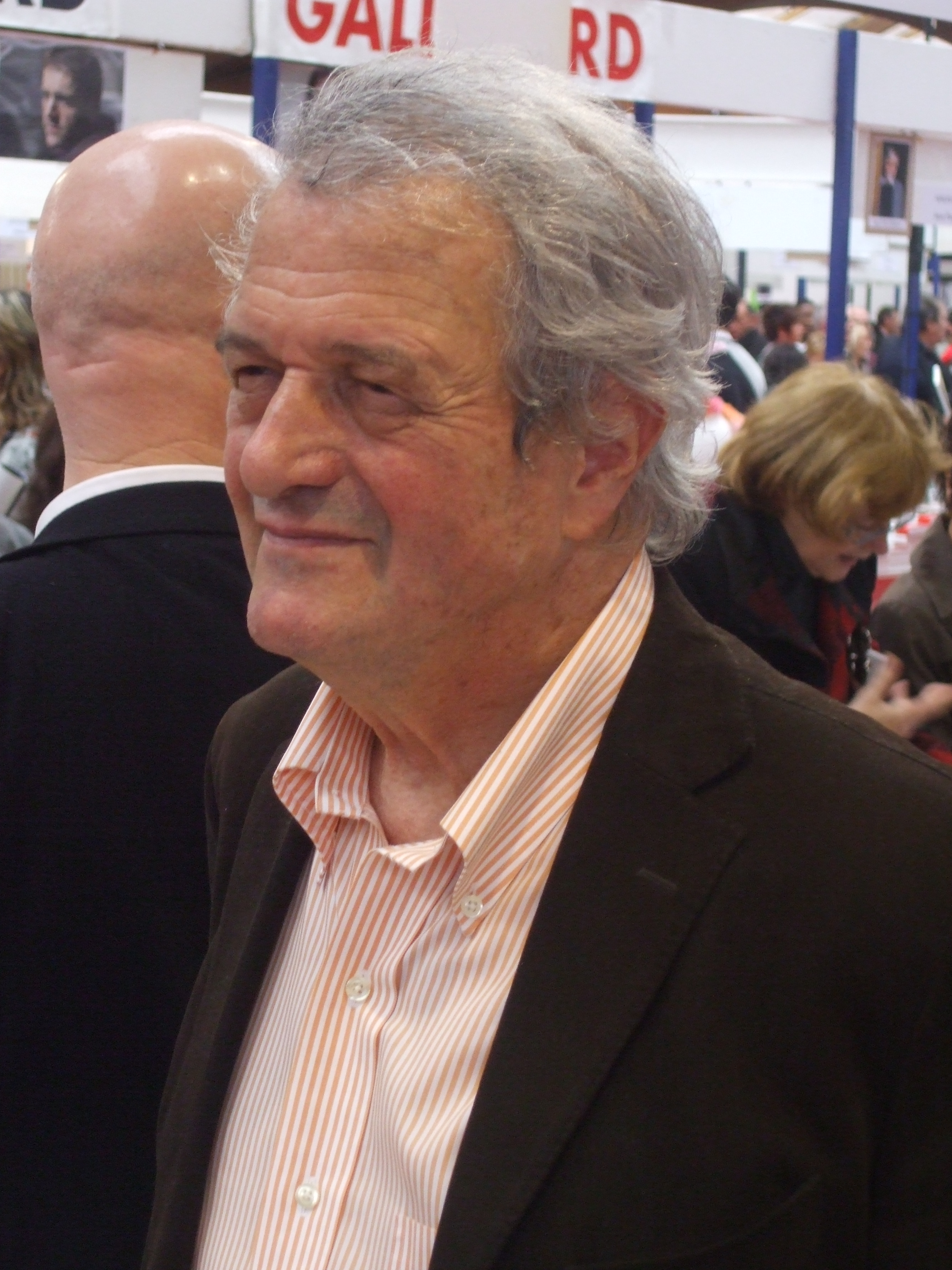
- Alexandre in 2010
- Born: 14 March 1932; 8th arrondissement of Paris, France
- Died: 31 October 2022 (aged 90); Le Touquet, France
- Occupations: Journalist; Writer

Philippe Alexandre (14 March 1932 – 31 October 2022) was a French journalist and writer. He notably worked as a columnist for RTL from 1969 to 1996 and presented several talk shows alongside fellow journalists Serge July and Christine Ockrent.

== Biography ==
=== Childhood ===
In his book Ma tribu plus que française, Alexandre recounted the assimilation of his Jewish family and the horrors many of his compatriots faced in World War II.

=== Career ===
Alexandre began his career in journalism in 1951 as an editor for the newspaper Combat. He then worked for several weeklies, such as Jours de France, Le Nouveau Candide, and Le Figaro littéraire. From 1969 to 1996, he was a columnist at RTL and spoke humorously on political news each morning for the radio station. He left the station following its merge with the German group Bertelsmann.

On television, he co-hosted the political show Le Débat on TF1 from 1989 to 1992 with Serge July and Michèle Cotta. He then hosted the France 3 shows À la une sur la 3 and Dimanche soir with Christine Ockrent and July. He then worked as a political columnist for BFM TV, France 3, and numerous magazines.

=== Death ===
Philippe Alexandre died in Le Touquet on 31 October 2022, at the age of 90. He was buried at the Le Touquet-Paris Plage Communal Cemetery on 5 November 2022.

== Publications ==
- L'Adversaire du Général, Gaston Defferre (1964)
- Le Duel De Gaulle-Pompidou (1970)
- Chronique des jours moroses 1969-1970 (1971)
- La Vie secrète de MONSIEUR LE (1982)
- Paysages de campagne (1988)
- Plaidoyer impossible pour un vieux président abandonné par les siens (1994)
- Nouveaux paysages de campagne (1997)
- Les Éléphants malades de la peste (2006)
- L'Élysée en péril : les coulisses de Mai 68 (2008)
- Dictionnaire amoureux de la politique (2011)
- Notre dernier monarque (2016)
- Ma tribu plus que française (2017)
