= Lucie Leiciague =

French communist (1880–1962)

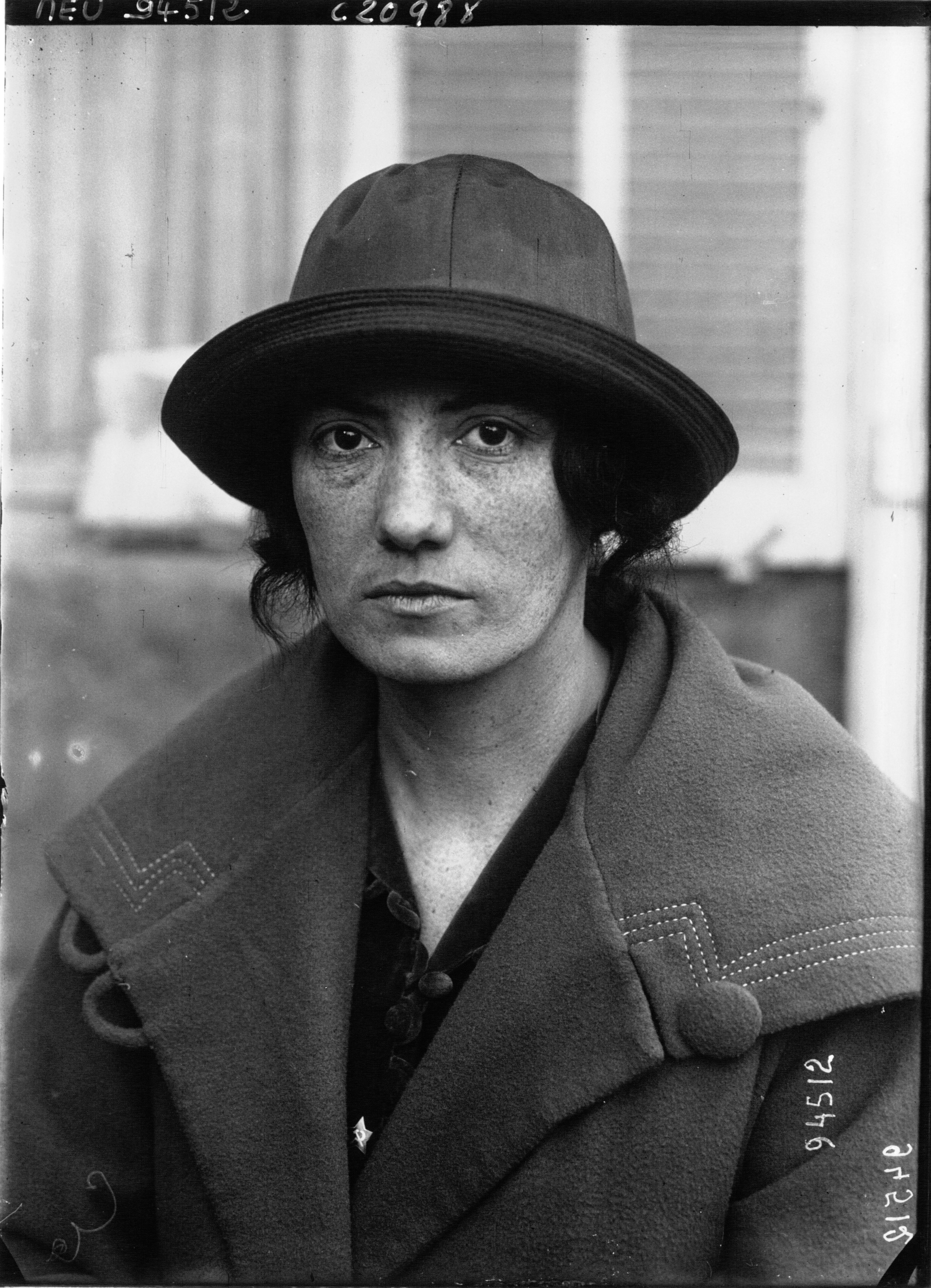
- Leiciague in 1921
- Born: Lucie Leziagazahar; 13 December 1880; Saint-Palais, Basses-Pyrénées, France
- Died: 21 May 1962 (aged 81); Orsay, Île-de-France, France
- Occupations: Communist activist, politician and writer
- Employer: L'Humanité
- Organization: Communist International
- Political party: French Communist Party; French Section of the Workers' International
- Spouse: Charles Le Gléo (m. 1931)

Lucie Leiciague (née Leziagazahar, married name Le Gléo, 13 December 1880 – 21 May 1962), also known as Lola, was a French communist activist, politician and writer. She was a member of the Central Committee of the French Communist Party (PCF) from 1920 to 1924 and served as a representative to the Communist International.

== Biography ==
Leiciague was born on 13 December 1880 in Saint-Palais, Basses-Pyrénées, France. Her parents were a carpenter and a housewife. She became a communist activist and writer.

During the Tours Congress, the 18th National Congress of the French Section of the Workers' International (French: Section française de l'Internationale ouvrière, SFIO), in December 1920, Leiciague was among members who voted to join the Third International and to create the French Section of the Communist International. She was elected as a member of the first Central Committee of the newly formed French Communist Party (PCF), serving from 1920 to 1924.

With Marcel Cachin and Ludovic-Oscar Frossard, Leiciague signed the motion of the Committee of the Third International for membership in the Communist International.

In December 1921, Leiciague was a representative to the congress of the Communist International held in Marseilles. In April 1922, she was appointed permanent French delegate to the Executive Committee of the Communist International (CCI), replacing Louis Sellier, and attended the Communist International congress in Moscow, alongside Lucie Colliard and 10 other delegates.

Leiciague spoke at the International about Clara Zetkin's call for women's suffrage, saying that for communist women "parliamentarianism is not an end in itself", but that "the demand for the vote has for it's not object the equality of the sexes (which is impossible under capitalism), but the possession one more weapon in the revolutionary struggle." She was also commissioned alongside Marthe Bigot to write a propaganda pamphlet for women, following a report that the French Communist Party had been slow to recruit women (only 2% of the party's members were women).

Leiciague wrote for L'Humanité newspaper, but broke with the SFIO in 1928, and subsequently lost her job at the newspaper in September 1929.

In 1931, Leiciague married Charles Le Gléo in Paris, and together they supported the Austrian Marxist and author Lucien Laurat. She continued to write for the left-wing press in France after World War II.

Leiciague died on 21 May 1962 in Orsay, Île-de-France, France, aged 81.
