= Sophie Massieu =

French journalist

Sophie Massieu (born 8 February 1975, Cherbourg-Octeville), is a journalist from the department of Manche in Normandy, France.

Daughter of a farmer, Sophie Massieu was born blind. She began her schooling at home in Réthoville, and then integrated a school for blind children which had just opened in Cherbourg, before going to the Institut National des Jeunes Aveugles (INJA), in Paris.

Despite her handicap, Sophie Massieu had remarkable studies : hypokhâgne, khâgne, Sciences-Po, then integrated in 1998 the centre de formation des journalistes (CFJ), in Paris as well.

Becoming professional in 2000, she is an independent freelance (L'Express, La Vie, Libération...), then chief editor during four years of the associative magazine "Facing", before multiplying radio experiments (RFI, France Information, France Inter), then television (Le Goût du noir, on France 5, with Gérard Miller). En 2012, she accomplishes a documentary series for the TV series Dans tes yeux d ' Arte (40 shows of 26 minutes each), where she visits 23 countries in ten months, for that she accepts the Trofémina prize in 2014.

== Works ==
- Quand bien même je verrais (avec Florence Montreynaud), éd. Nil, 1998
- Le Journaliste, responsable pas coupable ? (avec Michel Honorin), éd. Mango, 2001
- La Mémoire, architecte de l'homme ? (avec Soline Roy et Marie-Anne Lapie), éd. Mango, 2002
- Il n'y a que braille qui m'aille, éd. , 2003
- La Tête de l'emploi, éd. Vie & Cie, 2004
