= Jocelyne François =

French novelist (born 1933)

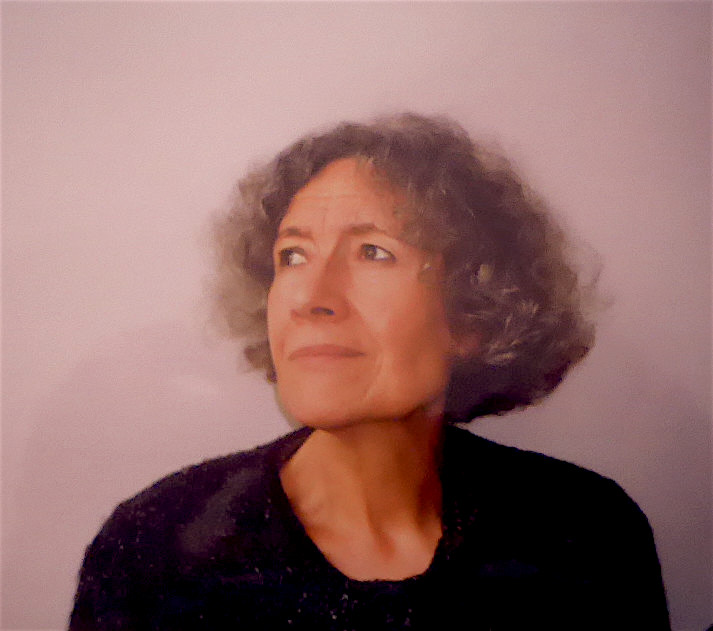
- Jocelyne Francois
- Born: 1933 (age 92–93); Nancy, Meurthe-et-Moselle, France
- Writing career
- Language: French
- Genres: Lesbian fiction, poetry
- Notable work: Joue-nous "España"
- Notable awards: Prix Femina

Jocelyne François (French pronunciation: [ʒɔslin fʁɑ̃swa]; born 1933 in Nancy, Meurthe-et-Moselle) is a French writer. She is the author of five lesbian novels, and winner of the Prix Femina.

== Career ==
François was born in Nancy as the eldest of three children; early on in her schooling, she gave evidence of great memory and a gift for writing. After six years in a Catholic boarding school, where she met her future partner Marie-Claire Pichaud, she studied philosophy in Nancy and married, more or less for convenience: the two oldest children of this marriage were raised by their father, the youngest by François and her partner. Her partner is a painter, whose artistic sensitivities greatly influenced François, who embarked on a career as a writer. A turning moment was meeting poet René Char in the 1960s. François and Pichaud lived in Saumane-de-Vaucluse for twenty-five years before moving to Paris in 1985, amid health problems.

Her first novel was Les Bonheurs, published in 1970 with Laffont and republished in 1982 with Mercure de France, which publishes all her work. She received the Prix Femina for Joue-nous "España" in 1980, and the Prix Erckmann-Chatrian for Portrait d’homme au crépuscule in 2001.

Besides novels, she also writes poetry and experimental prose. She began publishing her diaries; in 2009, the fourth volume (covering 2001–2007) was released.

== Themes and evaluation ==
In the French canon, François's work and success is said to testify to the viability and strength of gay and lesbian literature, and adds to the corpus of a feminist, radical lesbian literature begun by Violette Leduc, Monique Wittig, and Christiane Rochefort. Her winning the Prix Femina helped signal that literature's "institutional consecration." Alongside Jeanne Galzy and Mireille Best, she is credited with creating "images of lesbians [which] challenge both the dominant heterosexist ideology and the limiting idea of the lesbian novel as manifesto in order to offer new visions of sexual identity." Love, or the "ardeur [de l'amour] qui structure les jours," is an overarching theme in all her work, poetry or prose.

Les Bonheurs (1970) is the first of a series of five partly autobiographical novels (even a "lesbian memoir") that explore lesbianism, relationships, marriage, and love. It is "a study of love in a hostile context, of lesbian love in a heterosexual world, trying to survive alongside religious belief dictated by a homophobic church." The novel's main characters, Sarah and Anne, have loved each other since they met, at age 16, but Anne breaks off their relationship after being told to do so by her priest. Both have relationships with men as well: Anne marries, and Sarah has an affair with a married man. After ten years the two get back together again.

Les Amantes (1978) picks up a few years after Les Bonheurs left off. Sarah (a painter) lives with the unnamed narrator (a poet) in Provence. Both are also potters. There is a child, and two other children visit for school holidays. A male friend offsets this balance, but the narrator's devotion to Sarah is absolute. The man's desire, however, leaves no room for anyone else, and destroys the relationship.

In Joue-nous "España" (1980), "based on the author's childhood and adolescence," François investigates the influence of a strict Catholic education on a child's understanding of religion, love, and the world. The novel was translated into English as Play Us España, and referred to as an "[excellent] young lesbian's autobiography."

Histoire de Volubilis (1986), like Les Amantes, features a writer and a painter, Cécile and Elisabeth. Their relationship is threatened by the machinations of a psychologist and her husband, and rendered even more difficult by the mental problems experienced by Cécile's (grown) children.

La femme sans tombe (1995) is the last of the five novels; its publication was apparently delayed because of a sickness on the part of the author. Some of the autobiographical aspects have been clarified by the intermediate publication of Le Cahier vert, 1961-1989 (1990), a journal of the author's childhood, which includes an account of her long relationship with a Marie-Claire Pichaud—a painter and a potter—versions of whom inhabit the novels.

== Bibliography ==
=== Novels ===
- Les Bonheurs (1970, republished 1982)
- Les Amantes (1978)
- Joue-nous "España" (1980)
- Histoire de Volubilis (1986)
- La femme sans tombe (1995)
- Les Amantes ou tombeau de C. (1998)
- Portrait d'homme au crépuscule (2001)

=== Poetry ===
- Signes d'air (1982, ISBN 2-7152-0032-3)

=== Diaries ===
- Le Cahier vert, 1961-1989 (1990)
- Journal 1990-2000, une vie d’écrivain (2001)
- Le Solstice d'hiver: journal 2001-2007 (2009)

=== Prose ===
- Le Sel (1992)
- La Nourriture de Jupiter (1998)
