= Madeleine Desroseaux =

Madeleine Desroseaux is the pseudonym of Florentine Monier (1873-1939), a Breton poet and novelist.

== Biography ==
Born in Rennes in 1873, she published poems very early in the local press. On February 4, 1895, she married André Degoul in Rennes. The same year, in July, the couple founded Le Clocher Breton (The Breton Bell Tower), a bilingual literary journal which was published until 1915.

Numerous artists and intellectuals of the country such as Loeiz Herrieu, Anatole Le Braz, Theodore Botrel, Alphonse de Chateaubriant, Charles Le Goffic or Jean-Pierre Calloc'h gathered around them. They were rewarded for the compilation of their writings by President Raymond Poincaré, on 6 July 1913.

A publication of theirs, Poems of Brittany Times was crowned by the French Academy in 1930. From 1934, a regular collaboration with the Review of Two Worlds consolidated her fame.

Madeleine Desroseaux died in Lorient on May 3, 1939.

M. Desroseaux and A. Degoul are buried in Lorient, in Carnel cemetery.
