= Saint-Antoine-du-Rocher =

- Commune
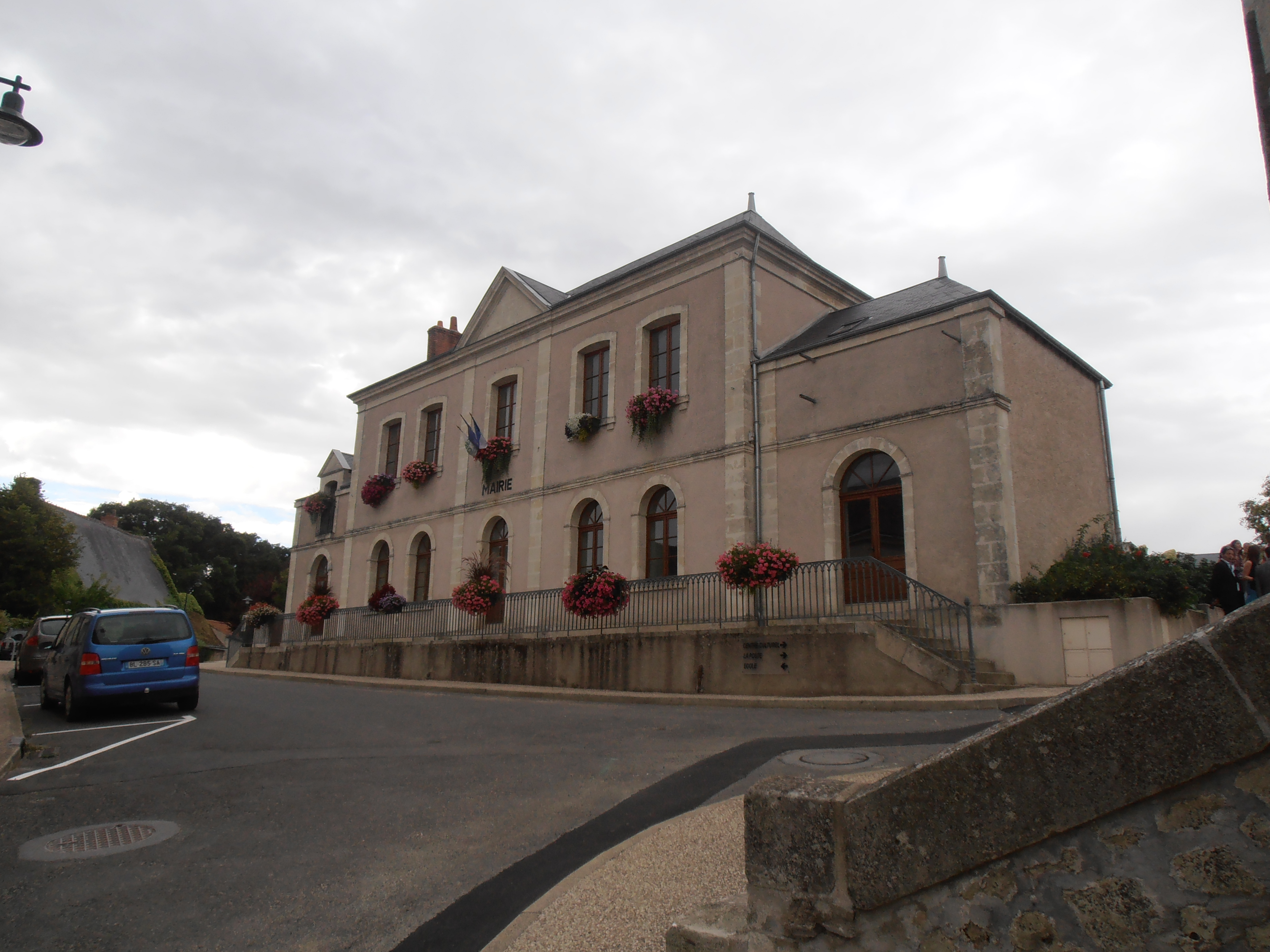
- Town hall
- Location of Saint-Antoine-du-Rocher
- Location within France Location within Centre-Val de Loire
- Coordinates: 47°29′49″N 0°37′52″E
- Country: France
- Region: Centre-Val de Loire
- Department: Indre-et-Loire
- Arrondissement: Chinon
- Canton: Château-Renault
- Intercommunality: CC Gâtine-Racan

Government
  - Mayor (2020–2026): Claude Pain
- Area^{1}: 24.23 km^{2} (9.36 sq mi)
- Highest elevation: 127 m (417 ft)
- Lowest elevation: 60 m (200 ft)
- Population (2023): 1,824
  - Density: 75.28/km^{2} (195.0/sq mi)
- Time zone: UTC+01:00 (CET)
  - Summer (DST): UTC+02:00 (CEST)
- INSEE/Postal code: 37206 /37360
- ^{1} French Land Register data, which excludes lakes, ponds, glaciers > 1 km^{2} (0.386 sq mi or 247 acres) and river estuaries.

Saint-Antoine-du-Rocher (French pronunciation: [sɛ̃.t‿ɑ̃twan dy ʁɔʃe]) is a commune in the Indre-et-Loire department in central France.

== Population ==
Historical population
Year	Pop.	±% p.a.
1968	660	—
1975	679	+0.41%
1982	818	+2.70%
1990	924	+1.53%
1999	1,096	+1.91%
2007	1,341	+2.55%
2012	1,533	+2.71%
2017	1,720	+2.33%
2023	1,824	+0.98%
Source: INSEE

== See also ==
- Communes of the Indre-et-Loire department
