= Valérie Valère =

French writer

- Born: 1 November 1961; Paris, France
- Died: 17 December 1982 (aged 21); Saint-Maur-sur-le-Loir, France

Valérie Valère was the pseudonym of Valérie Samama (1 November 1961 – 17 December 1982), a French writer.

She published her first work, the book Le Pavillon des enfants fous, in 1978 after spending four months confined to a psychiatric hospital for anorexia nervosa. The book is an autobiographical account covering her relationship with her abusive parents, experiences as a child in French society, and in particular her institutionalized years. Critics praised her style of writing and her expressive, philosophically sophisticated articulations of systemic mistreatment and misunderstanding. Scholar Richard A. Mazzara likens her work to Jean-Paul Sartre, Albert Camus, Hermann Hesse, André Gide, and Virginia Woolf.

== Life ==
Valérie Samama was born in the 15th arrondissement of Paris to a family of Tunisian origin.

At age 13, after a family shock, she was committed to a psychiatric hospital for anorexia nervosa. Two years later she wrote a book about it, Le Pavillon des enfants fous ("The mad children's ward"), published in 1978 by Editions Stock. On Bernard Pivot's talk show Apostrophes, 27 April 1979, she said that she had received ten rejection letters from publishers before Stock accepted her manuscript. Her book criticizes the hospital setting in which she spent four months, describing it as coercive, humiliating and dehumanizing for the patients.

In parallel with her studies at the lycée Racine in Paris, she took courses in tightrope walking at the school of Annie Fratellini. She saw the circus, like writing, as a way to escape reality. After obtaining her baccalauréat, she left to study at the Sorbonne.

With the success of her first novel, she rented an apartment where she wrote Malika ou un Jour comme un autre ("Malika or a day like any other"), published in 1979, et Obsession blanche ("White obsession") the next year. In Malika she tells of a difficult relation between and a brother and a sister whom the adults bring to death, written from the point of view of the brother.

She acted in two films, Pierrette (1977) by Guy Jorré and Équilibres (1979) de Marion Hänsel.

She took her life at age 21, on 17 December 1982.

In 2001, Isabelle Clerc wrote the first biography of Valérie Valère, Un seul regard m'aurait suffi ("One look would have been enough for me"), published by Perrin with an unpublished text by the author, Laisse pleurer la pluie sur tes yeux ("Let the rain weep on your eyes"), contributed by its historic publisher Christian de Bartillat.

== Published works ==
- Le Pavillon des enfants fous (1978)
- Malika ou un jour comme tous les autres (1980)
- Obsession blanche (1981)
