= Nathalie Ferlut =

French comics artist

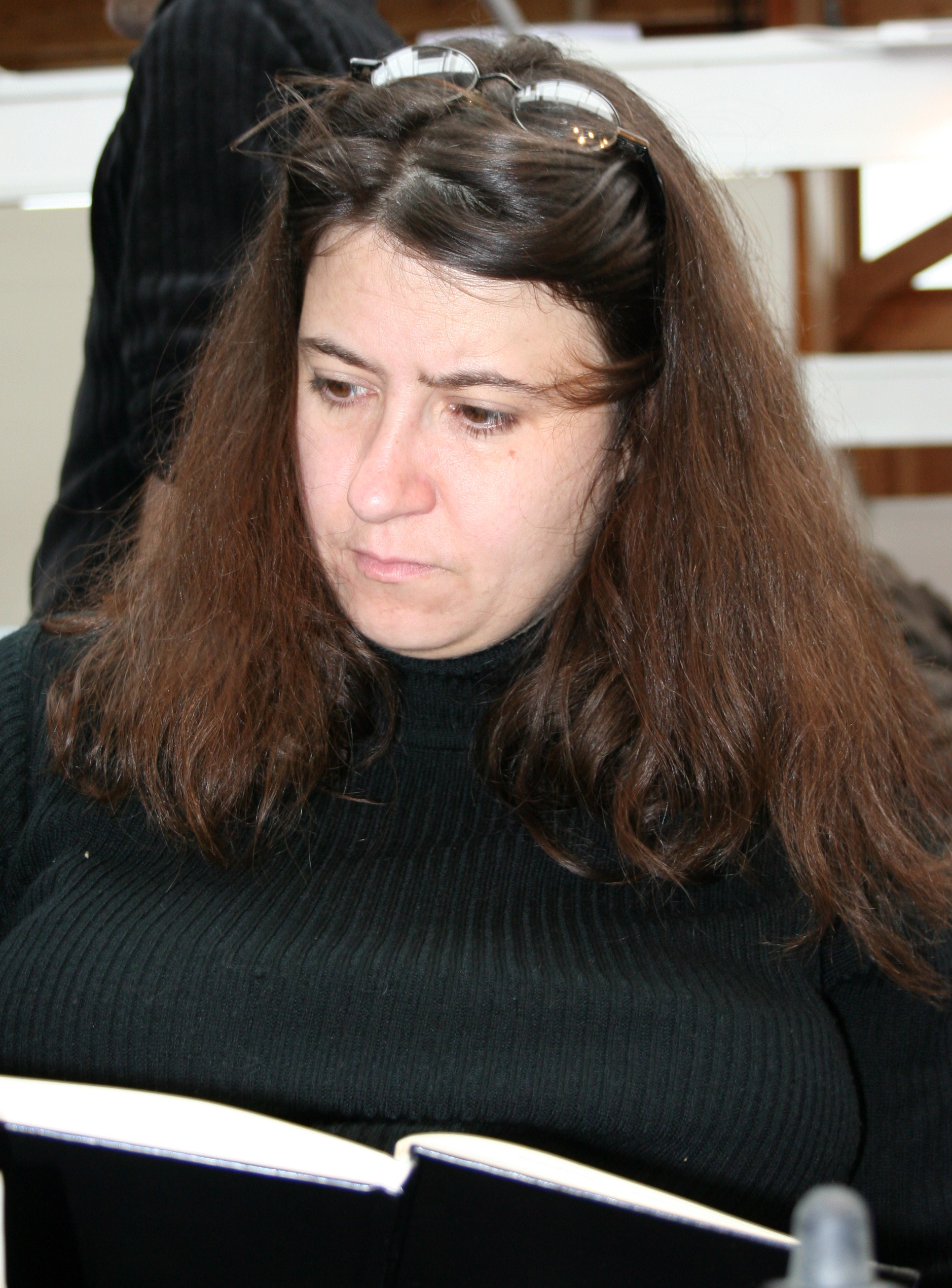
- Born: 26 November 1968
- Occupation: Comics artist
- Spouse(s): Thierry Leprévost

Nathalie Ferlut (born 26 November 1968, Sète) is a French bande dessinée cartoonist who works as a comic book illustrator, scriptwriter, and colorist.

== Biography ==
After a baccalaureate in plastic arts in Nîmes, Ferlut obtained a DEUG in art history and then in film school at the Paul Valéry University Montpellier 3. After attending the comic book workshop at the Beaux-Arts d'Angoulême, she obtained a diploma in model making in 1993.

She worked in cartooning, before launching, in 2000, her first comic book, Ether Glister, a science fiction series drawn by Yoann, then Thierry Leprévost.

In January 2010, she published Elisa (Delcourt). In the same year, she collaborated in the online serial, Les Autres Gens, scripted by Thomas Cadène. In 2013, Ferlut published Eve sur la balançoire, inspired by the true story of Evelyn Nesbit, an American showgirl from the early 20th century, mainly known for her involvement in the murder of her ex-lover, the architect Stanford White, by her first husband, Harry Kendall Thaw. Inspired by the paintings of Edgar Degas, Henri de Toulouse-Lautrec, and Félix Vallotton, this is the first album in which Ferlut works as a colorist.

Her next book, Andersen, les Ombres d'un conteur, focuses on the figure of Hans Christian Andersen. Each of the twelve chapters recounts an episode in the writer's life and is presented in the form of a tale. In collaboration with the cartoonist Tamia Baudouin, Ferlut conceived in 2017 the album Artemisia (Delcourt), which tells the life of the Italian artist Artemisia Gentileschi. Dans la forêt des lilas, written by Ferlut and drawn by Tamia Baudouin, was published in 2019.

== Selected works ==
- Ether Glister
  - 1, Catharzie, Delcourt, 2000 (script, Nathalie Ferlut; design and colorist, Yoann), ISBN 2-84055-291-4
  - 2, Le fantôme de Miño, Delcourt, 2004 (script, Nathalie Ferlut; design and colorist, Thierry Leprévost), ISBN 2-84055-794-0
- Le Bel Inconnu, freely adapted from the eponymous novel by Renaud de Beaujeu
  - 1, Il y avait alors à la cour d'Arthur..., Carabas, 2004 (script and design, Nathalie Ferlut; colorist, Thierry Leprévost)
  - 2, Ce que l'on trouve par delà le point..., Carabas, 2005 (script and design, Nathalie Ferlut; colorist, Thierry Leprévost)

=== One-shots ===
- Madame la lune 1. Les semeurs d'étoiles, Delcourt, 2001 (script, Jean-Luc Loyer; design, Nathalie Ferlut; colorist, Thierry Leprévost) ISBN 2-84055-539-5
- Lettres d'Agathe, Delcourt, 2008 (script, design, colorist, Nathalie Ferlut) ISBN 978-2-7560-1162-2
- Elisa, Delcourt, 2010 (script, design, colorist, Nathalie Ferlut)
- Eve sur la balançoire, Casterman, 2013 (script, design, colorist, Nathalie Ferlut) ISBN 978-2-203-06639-7
- Andersen, les Ombres d'un conteur1, Casterman, August 2016 (script, design, colorist, Nathalie Ferlut)
- Artemisia, Delcourt, August 2017 (script, Nathalie Ferlut; design and colorist, Tamia Baudouin)
- Dans la forêt des lilas (script, Nathalie Ferlut; design and colorist, Tamia Baudouin), Éditions Delcourt, 2019

=== Participation in collectives ===
- Les enfants sauvés, Delcourt, 2008 (script, Philippe Thirault; design, [collectif] ISBN 978-2-7560-1576-7
- Mon chat à moi, Delcourt, 2008 (script and design, Jenny, Colonel Moutarde, Philippe Larbier, Jean-Sébastien Bordas, Chloé Cruchaudet, Pau, Alice Picard, Jérôme Jouvray, Nathalie Ferlut, Yannick Corboz, Bengal) ISBN 978-2-7560-1557-6
- 4, Les Autres Gens, Dupuis, 2011 (script, Thomas Cadène; design, [collectif])
- En chemin elle rencontre... 2 : Les artistes se mobilisent pour le respect des droits des femmes, Des ronds dans l'O - Amnesty International, 2011 (script, design: [collectif]) ISBN 978-2-917237-15-1
- 6, 7, Les Autres Gens, Dupuis, 2012 (script, Thomas Cadène; design, [collectif])
- Paroles d'école, Soleil, 2013 (script, Jean-Pierre Guéno; design, [collectif]) ISBN 978-2-302-03627-7
- Les années noires - Angoulême 1940 - 1944, Le Troisième Homme éditions, 2015 (script, Éric Wantiez; design, Fawzi, Thierry Leprévost, Alexeï & Oburie, Julien Maffre, Nathalie Ferlut)
