= Jacques Salomé =

French psychologist and writer

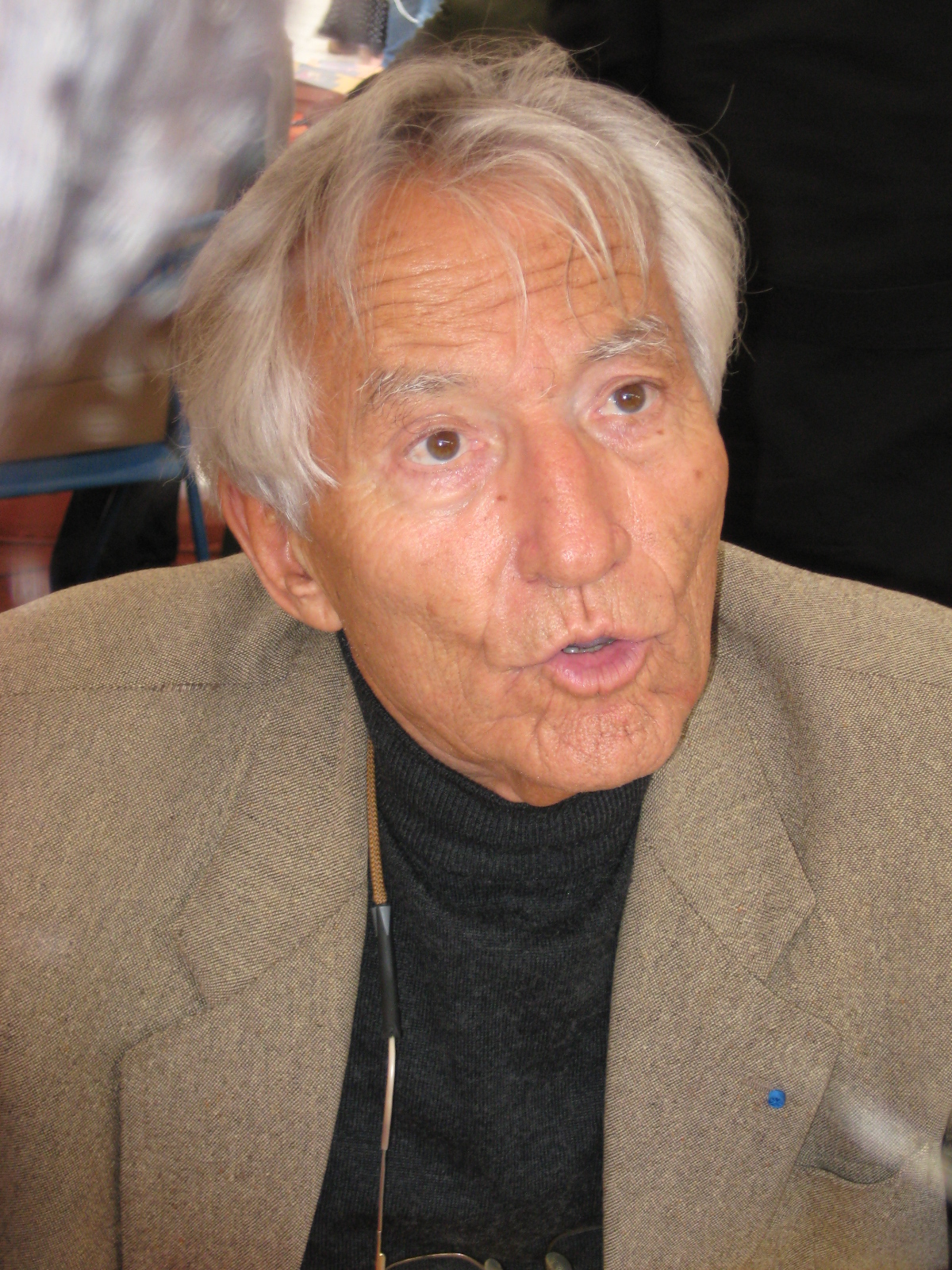
- Salomé at the Montpellier book comedy in June 2008
- Born: 20 May 1935 (age 90); Toulouse, France
- Education: École des hautes études en sciences sociales
- Occupations: psychologist, writer

Jacques Salomé (born 20 May 1935 in Toulouse) is a French psychologist and writer.

== Biography ==
Salomé studied at the École des hautes études en sciences sociales.

He suffered a severe stroke in 2014, which caused him to lose his ability to speak, but he continues to write.

== Bibliography ==
=== Family relationships ===
- En amour, l'avenir vient de loin, Albin Michel, 1996.
- Papa, maman écoutez-moi vraiment, Albin Michel, 1989.
- L'Enfant du possible, avec Nathalie Calmé, Henri Laborit, Jean-Marie Pelt, Bernard This, Albin Michel, 1992.
- C'est comme ça, ne discute pas, Albin Michel, 1996.
- Parle à mon nœud, il a des choses à te dire, Plon, 2001.
- Une vie à se dire, Les Éditions de l'Homme, 2003.
- Heureux qui communique, Albin Michel, 1993, 2003.
- Vivre avec les miens, Les Éditions de l'Homme, 2003.
- Dis papa, l'amour c'est quoi ?, Albin Michel, 2000.

=== School relationships ===
- T'es toi quand tu parles, Albin Michel, 1991.
- Charte de vie relationnelle à l'école, Albin Michel, 1995.
- Mille et un chemins vers l'autre, Éd. Le souffle d'or, 2002.
- Découvrir la communication relationnelle, avec Kathleen Gerlandt, Éd. Jouvence 2003.
- Minuscules aperçus sur la difficulté d'enseigner, Albin Michel, 2004.
- Pour ne plus vivre sur la planète Taire, Albin Michel, 2004.

=== Professional relationships ===
- Formation et supervision de l'éducateur spécialisé, Éd. Privat, 1972.
- Pour ne plus vivre sur la planète Taire, Albin Michel, 1997.
- Oser travailler heureux, Albin Michel, 1999.
- Formation à l'entretien et relation d'aide, Éditions Septentrion (Lille III), 2000.
- Manuel de survie dans le monde du travail, Éd. du Relié, 2010.

=== Self-relationships ===
- Contes à guérir, contes à grandir, illustrations de Dominique de Mestral, Albin Michel, 1993.
- Le Tarot relationnel, Albin Michel, 1995.
- Paroles d'amour, Albin Michel, 1995.
- Communiquer pour vivre, collectif sous la direction de Jacques Salomé, Albin Michel, 1996.
- Tous les matins de l'amour, Albin Michel, 1997.
- Paroles à guérir, Albin Michel, 1999.
- Les Mémoires de l’oubli, Albin Michel, 1999.
- Le Courage d’être soi, Éd. du Relié, 1999.
- Contes à aimer, contes à s'aimer, Albin Michel, 2000.
- Car nous venons tous du pays de notre enfance, Albin Michel, 2000.
- Lettres à l’intime de soi, Albin Michel, 2001.
- Je mourrai avec mes blessures, Éd. Jouvence, 2002.
- Vivre avec soi, Les Éditions de l'Homme, 2003.
- Si je m’écoutais je m’entendrais, Les Éditions de l'Homme, 2003.
- Passeurs de vie, Éd. Dervy, 2003.
- L’enfant Bouddha, Albin Michel, 1993, 2005.
- Et si nous inventions notre vie, Éd. du Relié, 2006.
- Contes d’errance, contes d’espérance, Albin Michel, 2007.
- Pourquoi est-il si difficile d’être heureux, Albin Michel, 2007.
- À qui ferais-je de la peine si j’étais moi-même, Les Éditions de l'Homme, 2008.
- Je viens de toutes mes enfances, Albin Michel, 2009.
- La Ferveur de vivre, Albin Michel, 2012.
- J’ai encore quelques certitudes, Albin Michel, 2015.

=== Novels and short stories ===
- Je m'appelle toi, Albin Michel, 1990; rééd. 1992.
- Je croyais qu'il suffisait de t'aimer, Albin Michel, 2003.
- N'oublie pas l'éternité, Albin Michel, 2005.
- Collective, Mémoire d'enfances.
- Apprivoiser la tendresse, Éd. Jouvence, 1988.
- Bonjour tendresse, Albin Michel, 1992.
- Au fil de la tendresse, avec Julos Beaucarne, Éd. Ancrage, 2000.
- Inventons la paix, Librio, 2000.
- Je t'appelle tendresse, Albin Michel, 2002.
- Un océan de tendresse, Éd.Dervy, 2002.
- Vivre avec les autres, Les Éditions de l'Homme, 2002.
- Collective, Le Grand Livre de la tendresse, Albin Michel, 2002.
- Paroles de rêves, Albin Michel, 2005.
- Inventer la tendresse, Éd. Bachari, 2005.
- Pensées tendres à respirer au quotidien, Albin Michel, 2006.
- Contes des petits riens et de tous les possibles, 2015.

=== Poems ===
- Toi, mon infinitude, calligraphies de Hassan Massoudy, Albin Michel, 2004.
