= Mireille Best =

French writer (1943–2005)

Mireille Best

Mireille Best (4 June 1943 – 16 January 2005) was a French author, known for her works of fiction featuring lesbian characters and themes.

== Background ==
Mireille Best was born in 1943 at Le Havre and raised by her grandmother, Albertine Best. A sickly child with hearing problems, she attended school infrequently. However, Best was a precocious child, reading Les Misérables at age 5. Despite the concerns of her mother, Best attended high school. There, she met Jocelyne Crampon, her future partner. However, multiple illnesses kept Best away from school long enough to prevent her from graduating. For some time, Best worked in a clothing factory, sewing plastic garments. After an accident with the machinery, Best took another job, at the urging of her mother. She and her partner traveled south, to Fréjus, and Best became a civil servant.

Best developed early-onset Alzheimer’s and died in 2005.

== Novels and short stories ==
Mireille Best’s first publication was a collection of short stories titled Les mots de hasard. It consists of five stories: “L’illusioniste”, “ La femme de pierre”, “Les mots de hasard”, “Le livre de Stéphanie”, and “La lettre”. The first four center around lesbian relationships and indirect criticism of socially instilled lesbophobia. The book won the Ville du Mans Prix de la nouvelle in 1981 and received glowing reviews from Le Monde.

The second book, Le méchant petit jeune homme, was a collection of three short stories. “Des fenêtres pour les oiseaux”, “Le méchant petit jeune homme”, and “La traversée” all repeat the lesbian theme of Best’s first book.

Best’s third book of short stories, Une extrême attention, contains “Psaume à Frédérique”, “L’encontre”, “Le gardien de la chose”, “Une extrême attention”, “Mémoire-écrin”, and “La conversation”. In this collection, she moves away from the lesbian theme, preferring to focus on stories highlighting the difficulty of communication.

Mireille Best’s first full-length novel is titled Hymne aux murènes and centers around the life of Mila, a young adolescent institutionalized for having “wings”. She falls in love with Paule, a junior member of staff. Paule appears to return her affections, but then shows interest in another girl. In revenge, Mila stages a performance of “The Little Mermaid”, casting the other girl as the mermaid and herself as the Prince. She then runs away from the hospital and returns home.

Camille en octobre, Best's second novel, is about the title character falling in love with her dentist’s pregnant wife, Clara. They have a brief affair on Camille’s birthday, but Clara moves away soon afterwards. Camille is left scarred by the non-reciprocal nature of her first relationship.

Best returned to short story writing with Orphéa trois. The book's stories included “Orphéa Trois”, “Promenade en hiver”, “Le Messager”, and “Lune morte”. While the stories shared a lesbian theme, they were darker, featuring “lesbophobia, and, more unusually, violence between lesbian lovers, who have often been stereotypically represented as pacific, mutually respectful, and free from the violent, possessive jealousy naturalized in men. This relatively bleak angle on lesbianism may partly explain at least two reviewers’ perception of a disillusioned tone in Orphéa trois.”

Best’s third novel, Il n’y a pas d’hommes au paradis, follows the life of Josèphe, focusing on her relationship with her intolerant mother and with her estranged girlfriend Rachel.

One notable feature of Best’s writing style was that she never used a semi-colon, claiming an inexplicable hatred of them. Instead, she used spaces to punctuate the pauses where a comma would be too short and a period would be too long.

== Bibliography ==
Best’s works were published by Gallimard and her publications include:

- Les mots de hasard (short stories), 1980
- Le méchant petit jeune homme (short stories), 1983
- Une extrême attention (short stories), 1985
- Hymne aux murènes (novel), 1986
- Camille en octobre (novel), 1988
- Orphéa Trois (short stories), 1991
- Il n'y a pas d'hommes au paradis (novel), 1995.

Some of her work has been translated, to Dutch :

- "La traversée" (extract from Le méchant petit jeune homme, translation by Rosa Pollé, éditions Furie, Amsterdam, 1988).
- Les mots de hasard (Zomaar wat woorden : novellen), translation by Rosalien Van Witzen, éditions Furie, Amsterdam, 1990.
- Camille en octobre (Camille), translation by Rosalien Van Witsen, éditions Furie, Amsterdam, 1990.
- Des fenêtres pour les oiseaux, translation by Rosalien Van Witsen

To German :

- Il n’y a pas d’hommes au paradis (Es gibt keine Menschen im Paradies), Berlin, Verlag Krug & Schadenberg, 1998.
- Camille en octobre (Camille im Oktober), Berlin, Verlag Krug & Schadenberg, 2000.

And to English :

- Camille in October translated by Stephanie Schechner, Kolkata/London, Seagull Books, 2019.
- An extract (12 pages) of the short story "Le livre de Stéphanie", translated by Janine Ricouart, is featured in an anthology of international lesbian fiction, entitled Worlds Unspoken.

== Critical reception ==
Best’s work was published at the prestigious press Gallimard and was well received by critics. However, little academic criticism has been published on her oeuvre. To date, only a few articles have been published on Best’s work and she is mentioned in a mere handful of books.

=== Articles ===
- Ricouart, Janine. "Enfance Magique ou infernale? Un Regard socio-critique sur l'œuvre de Mireille Best." Women In French Studies (2003): 150-165.
- Schechner, Stephanie. "The Young Woman and The Sea: Lesbians Coming of Age in Coastal Communities in the Novels Of Mireille Best." Women In French Studies 11 (2003): 50-63.

=== Books ===
- Cairns, Lucille, 'Mireille Best,' Who's Who in Contemporary Gay and Lesbian History from World War II to the Present Day, Eds Robert Aldrich and Garry Wotherspoon. (New York: Routledge, 2001), 21-34.
- Griffin, Gabriele, 'Mireille Best,' Who's Who in Lesbian and Gay Writing (New York: Routledge, 2002), 18.
- Provitola, Blase A. “Laborious Intimacies: Sexual Identity as Work in Mireille Best’s Il n’y a pas d’hommes au paradis.” ‘Taking up Space’: Women at Work in Contemporary France. 83–100. Eds. Siham Bouamer and Sonja Stojanovic. University of Wales Press, 2022.
- Schechner, Stephanie. "The Lesbian Body In Motion: Representations Of Corporeality And Sexuality In The Novels Of Mireille Best." Lesbian Inscriptions in Francophone Society and Culture. 123-142. Durham, England: Durham Modern Language Series, School of Modern Languages and Cultures, Durham University, 2007.
- Schechner, Stephanie. “La lutte contre la normalisation : representation de l’adolescence lesbienne dans les oeuvres de Jovette Marchessault et Mireille Best.” De l’invisible au visible: l’imaginaire littéraire et artistique de Jovette Marchessault. Eds. Roseanna Dufault, Celita Lamar. Montréal: Remue-ménage, 2012.

=== Book reviews and interviews ===
- de Ceccatty, René, “Les traine-soleil de Mireille Best: des tragedies dans un monde gris et timore”, Le Monde (15 March 1991).
- de Ceccatty, René, “Ça s’appelle l’amour”, Le Monde (7 April 1995).
- Garréta, Anne F., “A Questionnaire: French Lesbian Writers? Answers from Monique Wittig, Jocelyne François and Mireille Best”, Yale French Studies, 90 (1996), 235-41.
- Slawy-Sutton, Catherine, Review of Orphéa trois, The French Review 66:6(1993), 1037-8.
