= Catherine de Vivonne, marquise de Rambouillet =

French noble (1588–1665)

Catherine de Vivonne
- marquise de Rambouillet
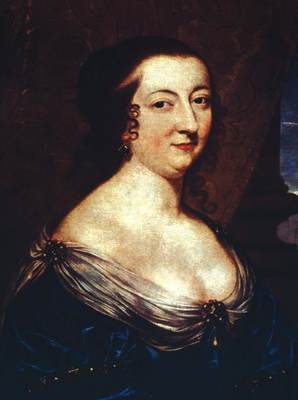
- (anonymous, 17th century)
- Born: 1588; Rome
- Died: 27 December 1665 (aged 76–77)
- Spouse: Marquis de Rambouillet
- Father: Jean de Vivonne
- Mother: Giulia Savelli

Catherine de Vivonne, marquise de Rambouillet (French pronunciation: [katʁin də vivɔn maʁkiz də ʁɑ̃bujɛ]; 1588 Rome, Italy – 27 December 1665), known as Madame de Rambouillet (French pronunciation: [madam də ʁɑ̃bujɛ]), was a society hostess and a major figure in the literary history of 17th-century France.

== Life ==
Born in Rome, she was the daughter and heiress of Jean de Vivonne, marquis of Pisani, and Giulia Savelli, who belonged to a noble Roman family. She was married at the age of twelve to Charles d'Angennes, vidame du Mans, and in 1612, marquis de Rambouillet. They had seven children, two sons and five daughters.

The young and witty marquise found the coarseness and intrigues of the French court little to her taste and, in 1620, she began to gather around her the circle that gave its renown to her salon. She and her husband had taken residence in Paris at the Hôtel Pisani, later renamed Hôtel de Rambouillet, and which she restored between 1618 and 1620. It was situated rue Saint-Thomas-du-Louvre, between the Louvre and the Tuileries. The former Hôtel de Rambouillet, which belonged to the d'Angennes family, was located rue Saint-Honoré and was sold in 1602 by her father-in-law, Nicolas d'Angennes. In 1624, it was bought by Cardinal Richelieu who had it demolished, and who built on its site his Palais Cardinal, future Palais Royal.

Madame de Rambouillet arranged the former Hôtel Pisani for the purpose of receiving her guests, and devised suites of small rooms where guests could move around and find more privacy than in the large reception rooms. She received her visitors in the chambre bleue, a salon painted in blue and with blue heavy brocade wall hangings.

The Hôtel de Rambouillet maintained its importance as a literary salon until the mid-17th century: the beginning of its decline was in 1645, year of the marriage of Julie and of the death of the 30-year-old marquis de Pisani, son of the marquis and marquise de Rambouillet; it continued in 1648, which saw the beginning of the Fronde and the death of Vincent Voiture, l'âme du rond ("the soul of the circle"), and was accelerated in 1652, at the death of the marquis de Rambouillet. Almost all major personages of the French aristocracy and literature of the time frequented it, and its reputation was at its height in the second quarter of the century. Occasionally, in spring and summer, the marquis and marquise de Rambouillet would entertain the habitués of their Parisian residence in the château de Rambouillet and its park.

Her success as a literary hostess (the term salonnière did not appear before the 19th century) has many explanations. Her natural abilities had been carefully trained. The marquise had a genuine kindness and a lack of prejudice that enabled her to entertain princes and princesses of the blood royal and literary men with the same grace, whilst among her intimate friends was the actress Angélique Paulet. The respect paid to ability in the salon effected a great advancement in the position of French men of letters. Moreover, the almost uniform excellence of the memoirs and letters of 17th century French men and women may be traced largely to the development of conversation as a fine art at the Hôtel de Rambouillet, and the consequent establishment of a standard of clear and adequate expression. Mme de Rambouillet was known as the "incomparable Arthénice", the name being an anagram for "Catherine", devised by François de Malherbe and Racan.

Among the more noteworthy episodes in the history of the Hôtel de Rambouillet are the literary quarrel between the Uranistes and the Jobelins - respective partisans of two famous sonnets, the Sonnet d'Uranie, by Vincent Voiture, and the Sonnet de Job, by Isaac de Benserade - and the composition by almost all the great poets of the day of the Guirlande de Julie, a collection of forty-one madrigals, each on the theme of a flower, offered in 1641 to Julie d'Angennes by Charles de Sainte Maure, who had been wooing her for ten years when he conceived the idea of the handsome manuscript, but whom she kept waiting four more years. Julie herself, the Hôtel de Rambouillet Princesse Julie, was responsible for a good deal of the preciosity for which the Précieuses were later ridiculed by Molière.

The Précieuses, who are usually associated with Molière's avowed caricatures and with the extravagances of Mlle de Scudéry, but a name Madame de Sévigné herself was proud to bear, insisted on a ceremonious gallantry from their suitors and friends, though it seems from the account given by Tallemant des Réaux that mild practical jokes took place at the Hôtel de Rambouillet. They especially favoured an elaborate and quintessenced kind of colloquial and literary expression, imitated from Giambattista Marini and Luís de Góngora y Argote, then fashionable throughout Europe.

Molière's immortal Précieuses ridicules was no doubt directly levelled not at the Hôtel de Rambouillet itself, but at the numerous coteries which in the course of years had sprung up in imitation of it. The satire affected the originators as well as the imitators, the former more closely perhaps than they perceived. The Hôtel de Rambouillet remained in existence until the death of its hostess, although the troubles of the Fronde diminished its influence.

The chief original authorities respecting Madame de Rambouillet and her set are Tallemant des Réaux in his Historiettes, and Antoine Baudeau de Somaize in his Grand Dictionnaire des Précieuses (1660).

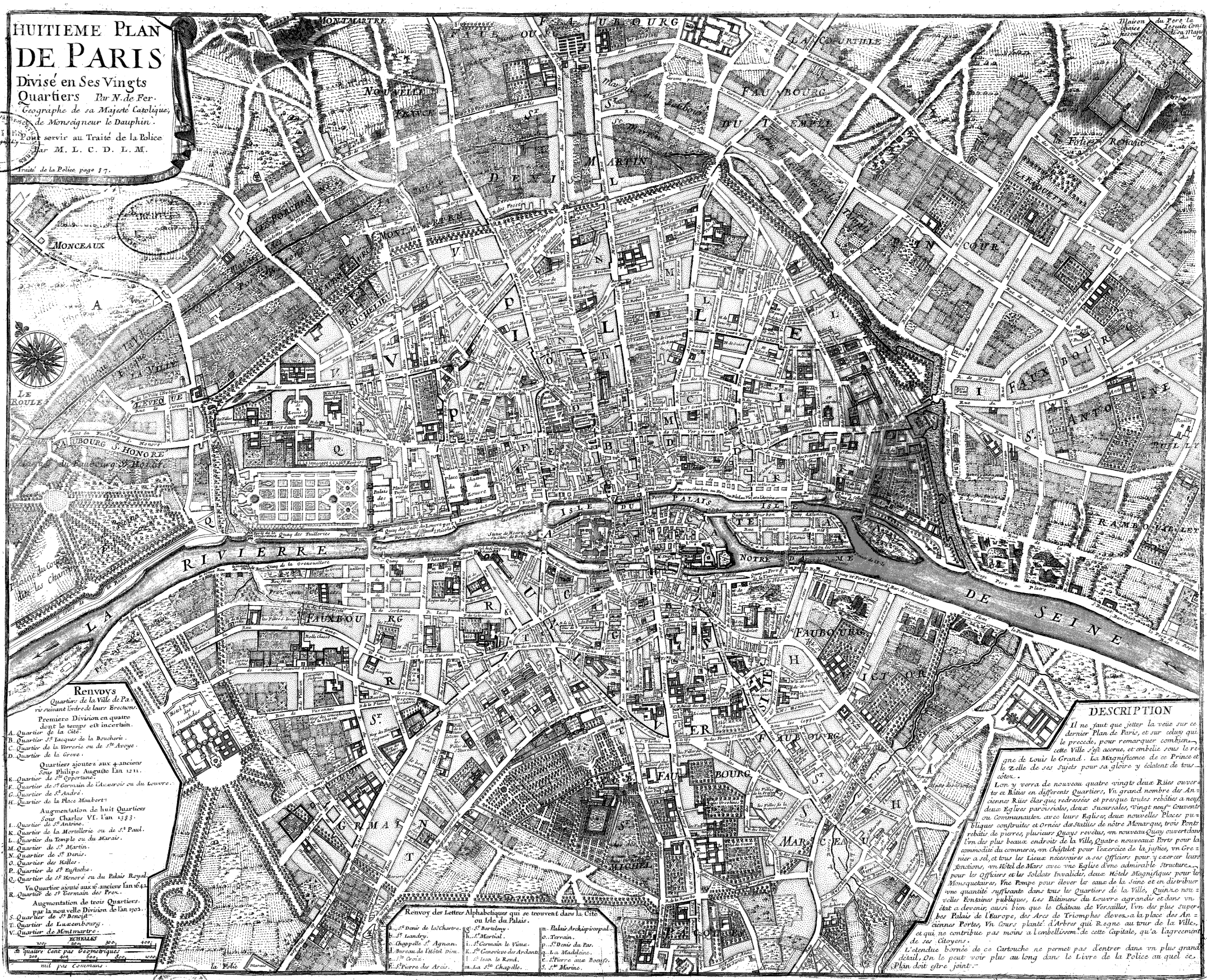
1705 Map of Paris by N. de Fer, showing the rue Saint-Thomas du Louvre between the Louvre and the Tuileries.

Among the habitués of Madame de Rambouillet's chambre bleue were:

- Jean-Louis Guez de Balzac
- Le Grand Condé
- Anne Geneviève de Bourbon, duchesse de Longueville
- Anne Marie Louise d'Orléans, Duchesse de Montpensier, La Grande Mademoiselle
- Honorat de Bueil, seigneur de Racan
- Roger de Bussy-Rabutin
- Jean Chapelain
- Claude de Chaudebonne
- Guillaume Colletet
- Valentin Conrart
- Pierre Corneille
- Jean Desmarets de Saint-Sorlin
- Claude Favre de Vaugelas
- Antoine Girard de Saint-Amant
- Antoine Godeau
- Madame de La Fayette
- Jean de La Fontaine
- François de Malherbe
- Claude de Malleville
- François Maynard
- Gilles Ménage
- Jean Ogier de Gombauld
- Angélique Paulet
- Madame de Sévigné
- Charles de Sainte-Maure, duc de Montausier
- Paul Scarron
- Georges de Scudéry
- Madeleine de Scudéry
- Gédéon Tallemant des Réaux
- Vincent Voiture

In homage to the Marquise de Rambouillet, the city of Rambouillet has named its Junior High School Collège Catherine de Vivonne.

== See also ==
- Vivonne (disambiguation)
