= Gédéon Tallemant des Réaux =

French writer (1619–1692)

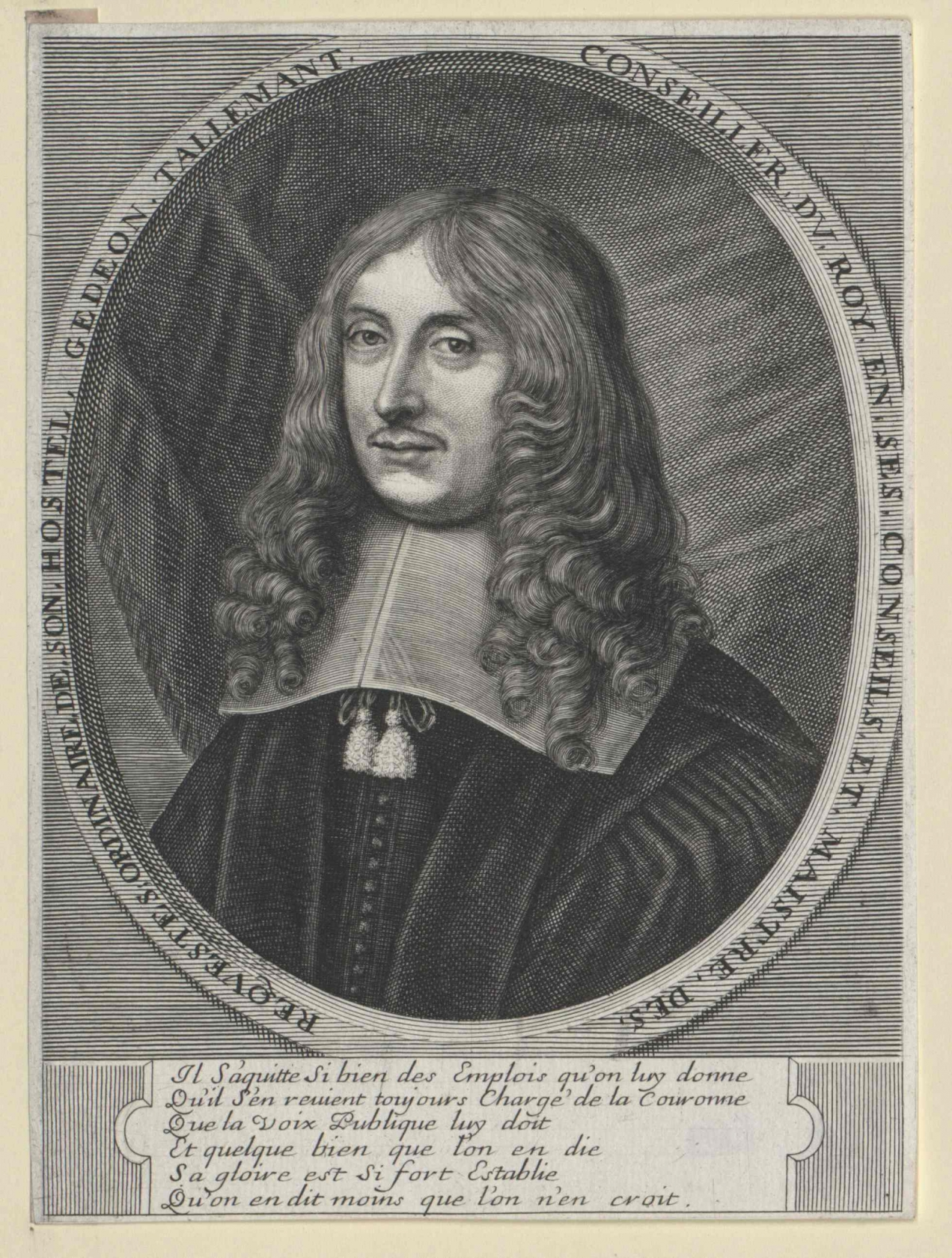
Gédéon Tallemant, Sieur Des Réaux

Gédéon Tallemant, Sieur des Réaux (7 November 1619 – 6 November 1692) was a French writer known for his Historiettes, a collection of short biographies.

== Biography ==
Born at La Rochelle, he belonged to a wealthy middle-class Huguenot family; the name des Réaux was derived from a small property he purchased in 1650. When he was about eighteen, he was sent to Italy with his brother François, abbé Tallemant. On his return to Paris, Tallemant took his degrees in civil law and Canon law, and his father obtained for him the position of conseiller au parlement. Disliking his profession, he decided to seek an alternative income by marriage with his cousin Elisabeth de Rambouillet. His half-brother had married a d'Angennes, and this connection secured for Tallemant an introduction to the Hôtel de Rambouillet.

Madame de Rambouillet was no admirer of King Louis XIII, and she gratified Tallemant's curiosity with stories of the reigns of Henry IV and Louis XIII that were of real historical value. The society of the Hôtel de Rambouillet opened a field for his acute and somewhat malicious observation. In the Historiettes he gives finished portraits of Vincent Voiture, Jean Louis Guez de Balzac, Malherbe, Jean Chapelain, Valentin Conrart and many others; Blaise Pascal and Jean de la Fontaine appear in his work; and he chronicles the scandals of which Ninon de l'Enclos and Angélique Paulet were centres.

The Historiettes are invaluable for the literary history of the time. Some suggest Tallemant's bourgeois background may have fueled the malice in his work, and that his pages seek revenge for the slights he endured. However, independent sources affirm the general accuracy of his accounts. In 1685, Tallemant converted to Catholicism, a decision that seemingly benefited him, as he soon after received a pension of 2,000 livres. He died in Paris.

== Works ==
Des Réaux was a poet and contributed to the Guirlande de Julie, but it is by his Historiettes that he is remembered. The work remained in manuscript until it was edited in 1834–6 by MM. de Châteaugiron, Jules Taschereau and Louis Monmerqué, with a notice on Tallemant by Monmerqué. A third edition (6 vols. 1872) contains a notice by Paulin Paris. Tallemant had begun Mémoires pour la régence d'Anne d'Autriche, but the manuscript has not been found.
