= Scudéry =

Scudéry is a surname. Notable people with the surname include:

- Georges de Scudéry (1601–1667), French writer
- Madeleine de Scudéry (1607–1701), French writer, sister of Georges
