= Racan =

Racan may refer to:

- Honorat de Bueil, seigneur de Racan (1589–1670), French aristocrat
- Ivica Račan (1944–2007), prime minister of Croatia
