= Charles Cotin =

French abbé, philosopher and poet

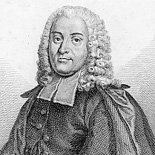
Charles Cotin (1604–1681)

Charles Cotin (French pronunciation: [ʃaʁl kɔtɛ̃]) or Abbé Cotin (1604 – December 1681) was a French abbé, philosopher, and poet in the Baroque Précieuses style. He was made a member of the Académie française on 7 January 1655.

Cotin was born and died in Paris. He was a scholar of Latin, Greek, Hebrew, and Syriac, an advisor to Louis XIV, and renowned in his time for his sermons, poetry, and erudition. He frequented the Paris literary salons, particularly that of the Hôtel de Rambouillet as a friend of Mlle de Gournay, and his translation of the Song of Songs is more notable for its flavour of fashionable salons than of sacred poetry.

In modern times, Cotin is best known for his violent squabbles with Nicolas Boileau and Molière, who gave him a stinging satiric immortality as the character Trissotin in Les Femmes Savantes.

== Works ==
- La Jérusalem désolée, ou Méditation sur les leçons de Ténèbres (1634)
- Recueil des énigmes de ce temps (1646)
- Théoclée, ou la Vraye philosophie des principes du monde (1646)
- Nouveau Recueil de divers rondeaux (1650)
- Traité de l'âme immortelle (1655)
- Œuvres meslées, contenant : énigmes, odes, sonnets et épigrammes (1659)
- La pastorale sacrée, ou Paraphrase du Cantique des Cantiques selon la lettre (1660)
- Oraison funèbre pour messire Abel Servien, ministre d'État et surintendant des finances (1659)
- La Ménagerie : à Son Altesse Royale Mademoiselle, a satire against Gilles Ménage, (1660)
- Réflexions sur la conduite du roi (1663)
- Œuvres galantes en prose et en vers de monsieur Cotin (1663)
- Odes royales sur les mariages des princesses de Nemours (1665)
- La Critique désintéressée sur les satyres du temps (1666)
- Poësies chrestiennes de l'abbé Cotin (1668)
