= Jean Claveret =

French playwright, lawyer and translator

Jean Claveret (1590–1666) was a 17th-century French playwright, lawyer and translator of Cicero, Cornelius Nepos and Valerius Maximus.

== Biography ==
He was born in Orleans around 1590. He studied law in the same city and became a lawyer at the Bar of Orleans, before giving up to become a dramatist. He asked Corneille, also a lawyer, recommendations and opinions. He created nine plays between 1629 and 1666, however, contemporary criticism has always been bad. He is described as mediocre by several contemporary playwrights, including Scudéry.

He took part in the famous querelle du Cid, a literary war surrounding the creation of the famous play by Corneille. Claveret was accused by Corneille of being the author of the anonymous pamphlet Le Vray Cid espagnol for which he used the pseudonym Balthazar La Verdad, and to have it circulated throughout Paris, which ended their friendship.

He was closed to Mairet and Scudéry, who constantly attacked Corneille. The latter wrote his Lettre apologétique in reply to the attacks of "Observations" by Scudéry, and about Claveret, he wrote: Il n'a pas tenu à vous que du premier lieu où beaucoup d'honnêtes gens me placent, je ne sois descendu dans toute estime au-dessous de Claveret ("It has not given to you that the first place where many honest people place me, I've stayed in all esteem below Claveret"). Furious, Claveret then published a violent text, Lettre du Sieur Claveret au sieur Corneille.

He died in 1666. His work then gradually fell into oblivion.

=== Literary originality ===
In the preface of the Ravissement de Proserpine, the author claimed not to have followed the Aristotelian rule of unity of place, essential to the likelihood, and very popular in the seventeenth century. For Claveret, the subject of his tragedy could not comply with this rule. However, he used a clever ploy by claiming that the unity of place was respected in a vertical line between heaven, Sicily and hell. He then constructed a decoration in three decks for the mise en scene of his play.

== Works ==
=== Theatre ===
- La Place royale, ou l'Amoureux extravagant, comédie jouée devant le roi à Forges avec succès et à Paris.
- Le Pèlerin amoureux, comedy.
- Les Baux de Forges, comedy.
- Le Roman du Marais, comedy, 1661.
- La Visite différée, comedy,
- L'Écuyer ou les Faux Nobles mis au billon, comédie du temps, en cinq, en vers, dédiée aux vrais nobles de France, 1665.
- Le Ravissement de Proserpine tragédie, dédiée à Mgr Claude Bullon, chevalier, Président au Parlement, Surintendant des Finances, 1639.
- L'Esprit fort ou l'Angélie : comédie en cinq actes, en vers, dédiée à Messire Alphonse de Vignancourt, 1637.

=== Pamphlets ===
- Lettre du Sieur Claveret, au Sieur Corneille, soy-disant autheur du Cid, l'Autheur du vray Cid espagnol, 1637.

=== Translations ===
- Valère Maxime. Traduit en françois par le Sr. de Claveret / A Paris : Chez la Veuve Jean Camusat et P. Le Petit, Impr. ord. du Roy, ruë S. Jacques, à la Toison d'Or, 1647.
- Dialogues de la Vieillesse et de l'Amitié, traduits du Latin de Cicéron par le sieur de Claveret. Nouvelle édition, traduction de Jean Claveret, 1646.
- Valére Maxime [trad. par Jean de Claveret], Paris, ed. C. Barbin, 1659.
- Les Vies des plus illustres généraux d'armée grecs et romains traduites du Latin de Cornélius Népos par le Sr de Claveret, Paris : P. Bienfait, 1663
- Valére Maxime. Traduction nouvelle par Jean de Claveret, 2 vol., Lyon, ed. H. Molin, B. Compagnon, V. Thomas et L. Declaustre, 1700.

== Sources ==
- M.J. Taschereau, Histoire de la vie et des ouvrages de Pierre Corneille, 1855, page 64-69, 304-305
- E Picot, Bibliographie cornélienne, pages 470-471.
- M. Ch. Marty-Laveaux, Œuvres de Pierre Corneille, tome I, page 385-386.
- Dictionnaire de biographie française / sous la dir. de M. Prevost et Roman d'Amat, 1959
- La Querelle du Cid, par Armand Gasté, 1899.
- Histoire du Théâtre en France, tome 3, E. Lintilhac
- Recherches sur les Théâtres de France, M. de Beauchamps, 1735.
- Nouvelle biographie universelle depuis les temps les plus reculés jusqu'à nos jours, avec les renseignements bibliographiques et l'indication des sources a consulter, volume 10, 1852.

=== See also ===
- Le Cid
- Classicism in the theatre
