= Angélique Paulet =

French musician (1592–1651)

Angélique Paulet (1592–1651) was a French précieuse, singer and lute-playing musician, one of the habitués of the famous literary salon of Catherine de Vivonne, marquise de Rambouillet, where she was called La Lionne rousse and La belle Lionne because of her red hair and proud poise. She often performed at the assemblies of the Chambre bleue by singing and playing the lute.

She was the daughter of the financier fr:Charles Paulet, one of king Henry IV of France's secretaries. According to Gédéon Tallemant des Réaux, Henry IV was assassinated while on his way to visit her.

The angélique, a musical instrument which first appeared in Paris in the 17th century, may have been named after her.
