= Artamène =

French novel

Artamène ou le Grand Cyrus
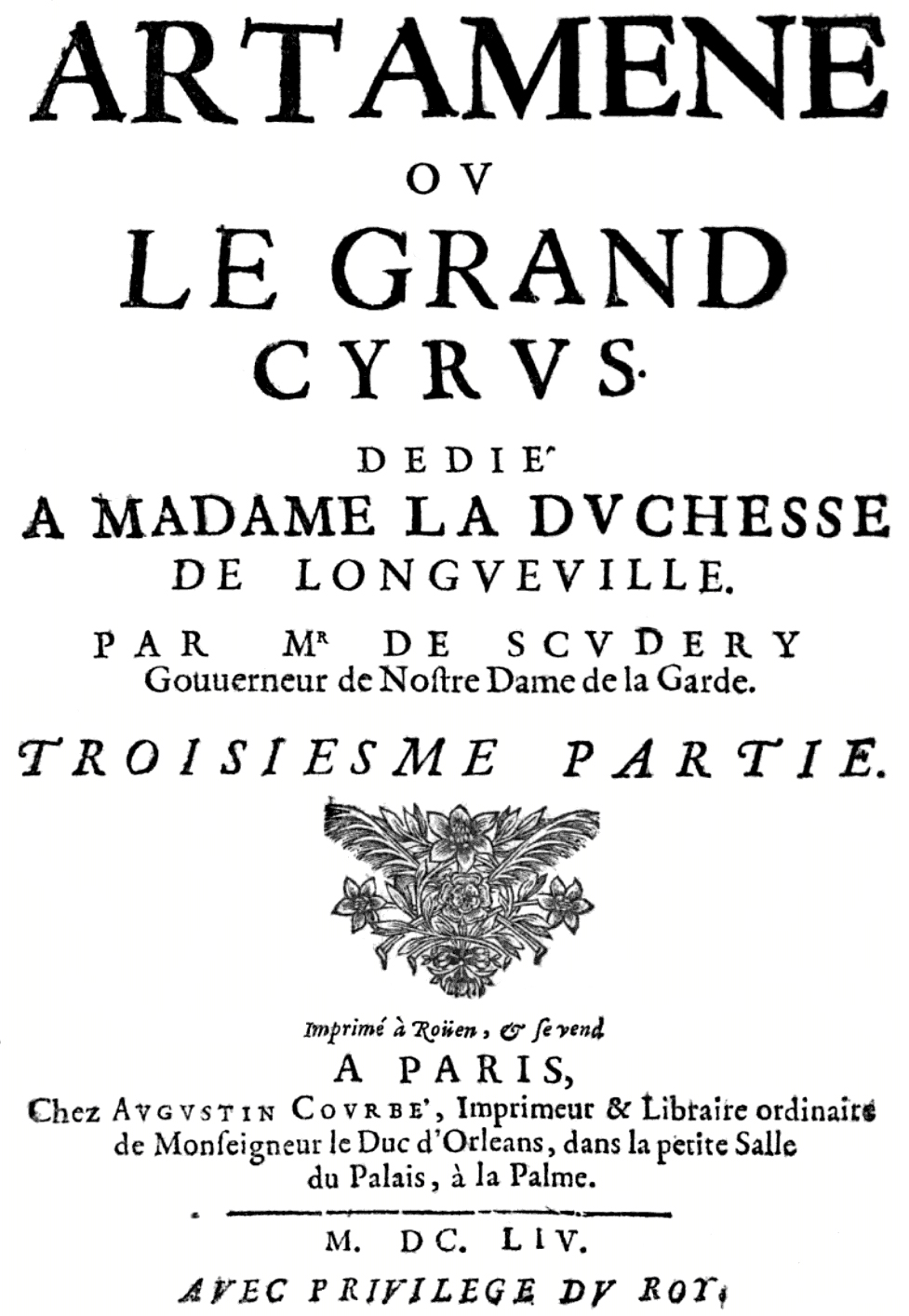
- Title page, part 3
- Author: Madeleine de Scudéry and/or Georges de Scudéry
- Language: French
- Genre: Roman-fleuve
- Publication date: 1649–53
- Publication place: France
- Pages: 13,095

Artamène ou le Grand Cyrus (English: Artamène, or Cyrus the Great) is a novel sequence, originally published in ten volumes in the 17th century. The title pages credit the work to French writer Georges de Scudéry, but it is usually attributed to his sister and fellow writer Madeleine. At 1,954,300 words, it is considered one of the longest novels ever published.

"Scudery’s major classical references and source-material comes from Herodotus’ Histories and Xenophon's Cyropaedia. Other sources include Plutarch, Justin, Polyaenus, Pliny, Ovid, Strabon, and the Bible." However, it is a roman à clef about contemporary personages.
