= Vincent Voiture =

French poet and writer

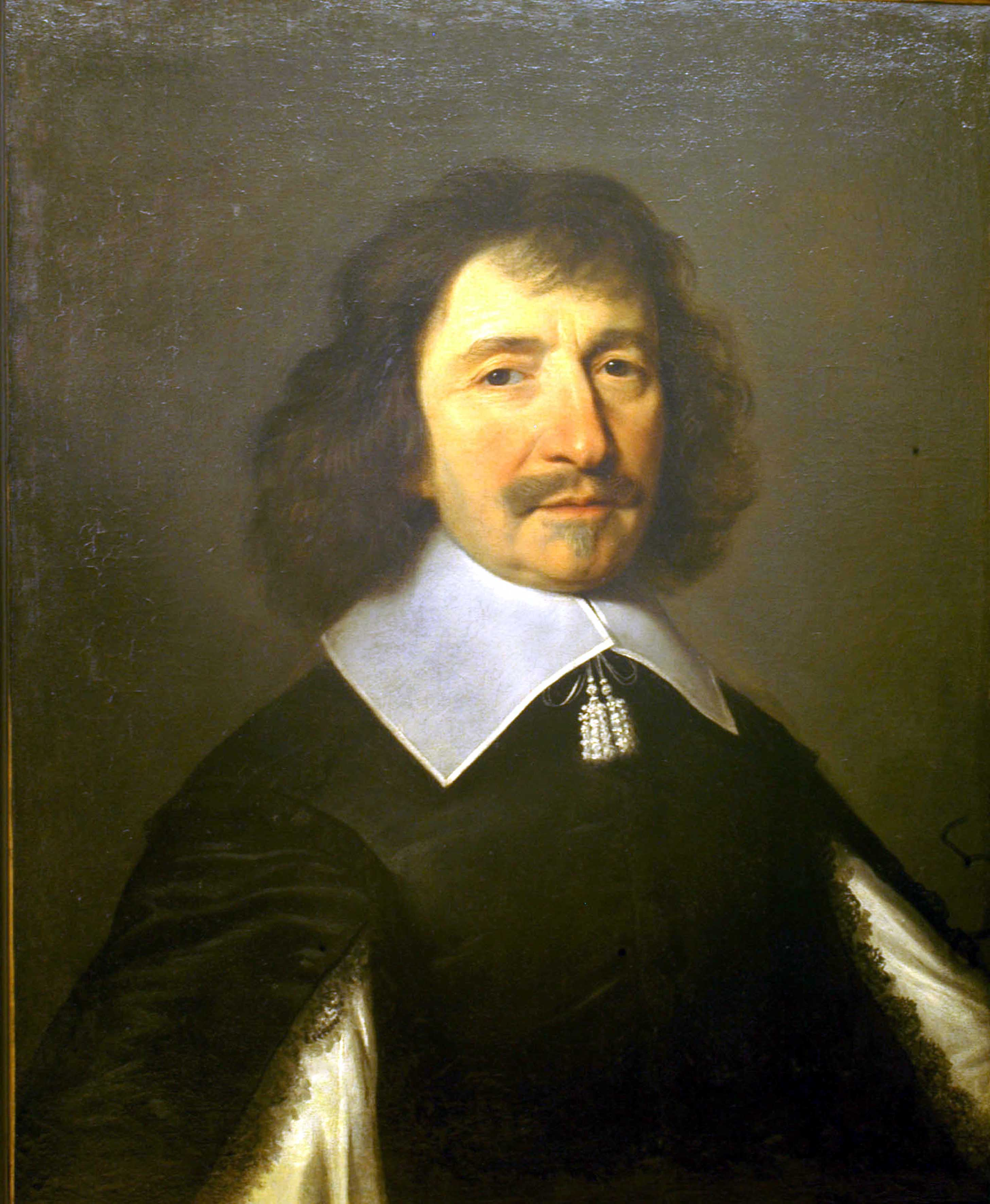
Vincent Voiture by Philippe de Champaigne

Vincent Voiture (French pronunciation: [vɛ̃sɑ̃ vwatyʁ]; 24 February 1597 – 26 May 1648), French Mannerist and Baroque Précieuses poet and writer of prose, was the son of a rich wine merchant of Amiens. He was introduced by a schoolfellow, the count Claude d'Avaux, to Gaston, Duke of Orléans, and accompanied him to Brussels and Lorraine on diplomatic missions.

Although a follower of the Duke of Orléans, he won the favour of Cardinal Richelieu, and was one of the earliest members of the Académie française. He also received appointments and pensions from Louis XIII and Anne of Austria.

He published nothing in book form, but his verses and his prose letters (published after his death by his nephew) were the delight of the coteries, and were copied, handed about and admired more perhaps than the work of any contemporary. He had been early introduced by Chaudebonne to the Hôtel de Rambouillet, where he became a close friend of Julie d'Angennes, the daughter of Charles d'Angennes and Catherine de Vivonne, marquis and marquise de Rambouillet. His ingenuity in providing amusement for the members of the circle ensured his popularity, which was never seriously threatened except by Antoine Godeau (nicknamed le Nain de Julie), and this rivalry ceased when Richelieu appointed Godeau bishop of Grasse.

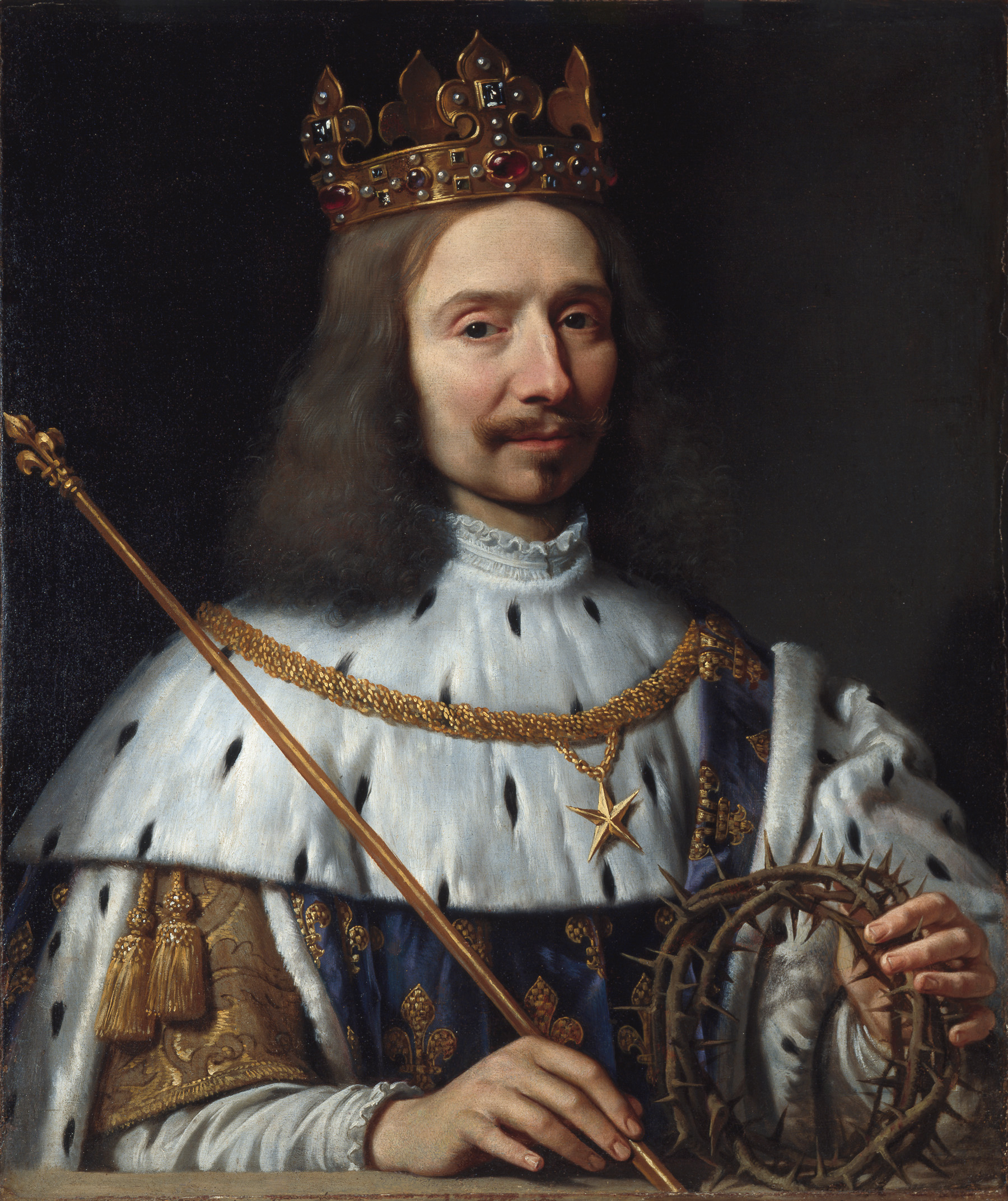
Vincent Voiture as Saint Louis

When at the desire of the duc de Montausier, nineteen poets contributed to the Guirlande de Julie, which was to decide the much-fêted Julie in favour of his suit, Voiture did not take part. The quarrel between the Uranistes and the Jobelins arose over the respective merits of a sonnet of Voiture addressed to a certain Uranie, and of another composed by Isaac de Benserade, till then unknown, on the subject of Job.

Another famous piece of his of the same kind, La Belle Matineuse, is less exquisite, but still admirable, and Voiture stands in the highest rank of writers of vers de société. His prose letters are full of lively wit, and, in some cases, as in the letter on Richelieu's policy (Letter LXXIV), show considerable political penetration. He ranks with Jean de Balzac as the chief director of the reform in French prose which accompanied that of Malherbe in French verse.

Voiture's death, on 26 May 1648, at the outbreak of the Fronde, marked the beginning of the end of the society to which he was accustomed.
