= Hôtel de Rambouillet =

Historic mansion in Paris

Coordinates: 48.8621°N 2.3350°E

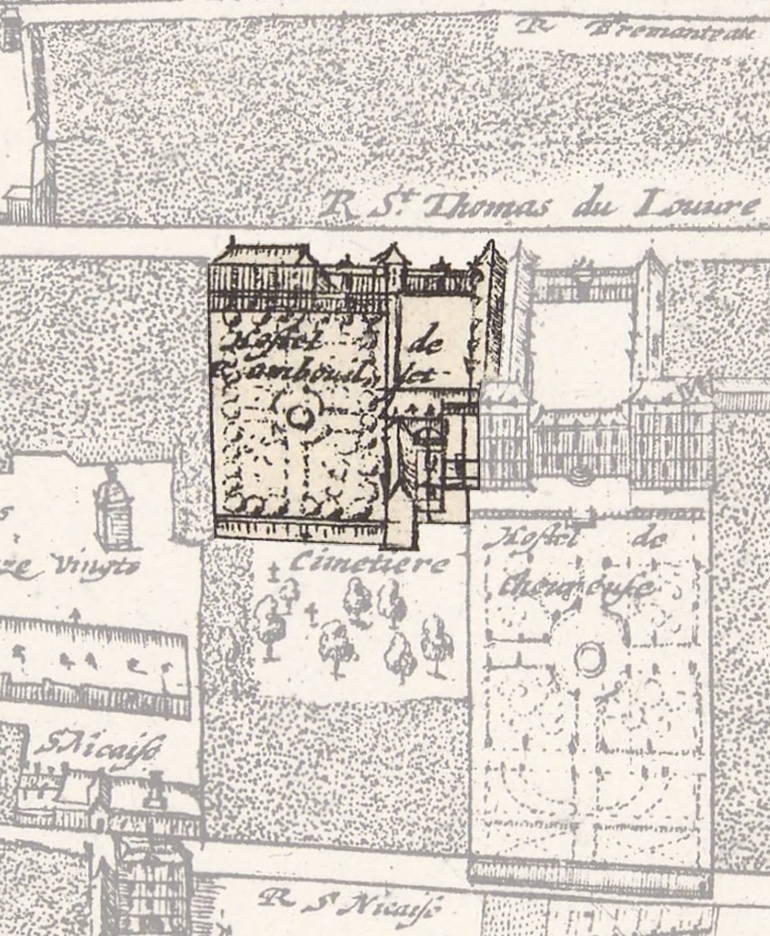
The Hôtel de Rambouillet on the 1652 Gomboust map of Paris

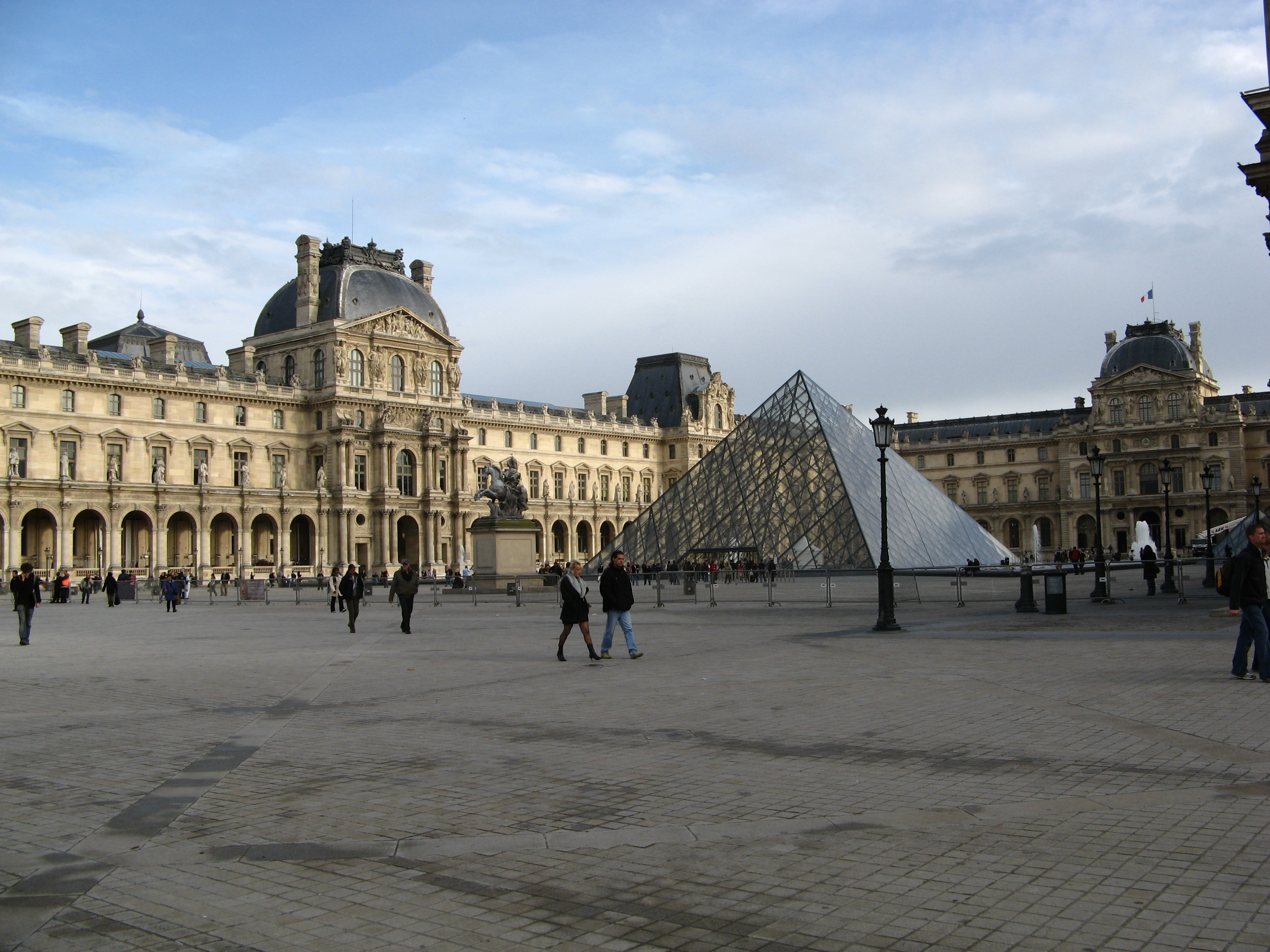
Catherine de Vivonne's Hôtel de Rambouillet was located at the extreme left of this photograph, where the Pavillon Turgot of the Richelieu wing of the Louvre Palace stands since the second half of the 19th century.

The Hôtel de Rambouillet (French pronunciation: [otɛl də ʁɑ̃bujɛ]), formerly the Hôtel de Pisani ([otɛl də pizani]), was the Paris residence of Catherine de Vivonne, marquise de Rambouillet, who ran a renowned literary salon there from 1620 until 1648. It was situated on the west side of the rue Saint-Thomas-du-Louvre, just north of Marie de Rohan's Hôtel de Chevreuse, in a former quarter of Paris (demolished during the 19th century), located between the Louvre and Tuileries palaces, near the then much smaller Place du Carrousel, in the area of what was to become the Pavillon Turgot of the Louvre Museum.

== Salon ==
Members of her salon, received in the intimacy of her Chambre Bleue, admitted to the ruelle—the space between her daybed and the wall of the alcove— represented the flower of contemporary French literature, fashion, and wit, including Madame de Sévigné, Madame de La Fayette, Mademoiselle de Scudéry, the Duchesse de Longueville, the Duchesse de Montpensier, Jean-Louis Guez de Balzac, Bossuet, Jean Chapelain, Corneille, François de Malherbe, Racan, Richelieu, La Rochefoucauld, Paul Scarron, Claude Favre de Vaugelas, and Vincent Voiture. They adopted for themselves the term précieux, which became a term of abuse when satirized by Molière in Les Précieuses ridicules (1659).

The quality looked for in this self-defining circle was honnêteté, a quality looked for in vain at the contemporary court, crass, ostentatious, corrupt and corrupting. Honnêteté was a mode of restraint and decorum, so practiced that it had become easy and as if natural, shared by aristocrats and fastidious members of the high bourgeoisie, but which could not readily be taught or learned. In contrast with the court, the Hôtel de Rambouillet received an elite that chose its own members, or, more precisely, whose members recognized one another's right to belong.... The ordinary rules of civility did not govern daily interchange. Members of the group wrote and above all talked to one another. Conversation was a sacred art, the forum in which the group developed its taste. L'Astrée was staged as well as read; other reading included the novels of La Calprenède and Mlle de Scudéry, which held up a mirror of this microsociety".

The préciosité refinements of the French language would find some codification in the Dictionnaire de l'Académie française eventually published by the Académie française, which found its start in the Hôtel de Rambouillet. Words like "celadon" to describe a certain range of pale glaucous blue-green glazes of Chinese porcelain come straight from the Hôtel de Rambouillet.

== See also ==
- Précieuses
