= Pierre de Bourdeille, seigneur de Brantôme =

French historian and soldier (1540–1614)

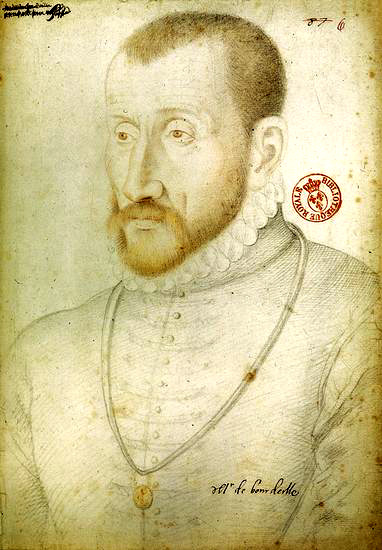
Pierre de Bourdeille, seigneur de Brantôme.

Pierre de Bourdeille (French pronunciation: [pjɛʁ də buʁdɛj], c. 1540 – 15 July 1614), called the seigneur et abbé de Brantôme, was a French memoirist, soldier and biographer.

After a varied and interesting career as a soldier that took him to Italy, Iberia, Scotland and Morocco, a disabling fall from a horse led him to spend his last 25 years in retirement, where he wrote his memoirs, intended for publication, which he clearly intended to represent his monument.

Their sensational picture of court life has kept them in print. The 1911 Encyclopædia Britannica reported that "His works give a picture of the general court-life of the time, with its unblushing and undisguised profligacy. There is not an homme illustre or a dame galante in all his gallery of portraits who has not engaged in sexual immorality; and yet the whole is narrated with the most complete unconsciousness that there is anything objectionable in their conduct", adding "De Bourdeille can hardly be regarded as a historian proper, and his Memoirs cannot be accepted as a very trustworthy source of information. But he writes in a quaint conversational way, pouring forth his thoughts, observations or facts without order or system, and with the greatest frankness".

== Life ==
Born at Bourdeilles in the Périgord, Brantôme was the third son of the baron François de Bourdeille and Anne de Vivonne. His mother and maternal grandmother, Louise de Daillon du Lude, were both attached to the court of Marguerite of Navarre. After Marguerite's death (1549), Brantôme went to Paris and later to Poitiers (1555) to finish his education. He was a nephew of Jeanne de Dampierre, who belonged to the royal household and whom he cited as a source of information in his works.

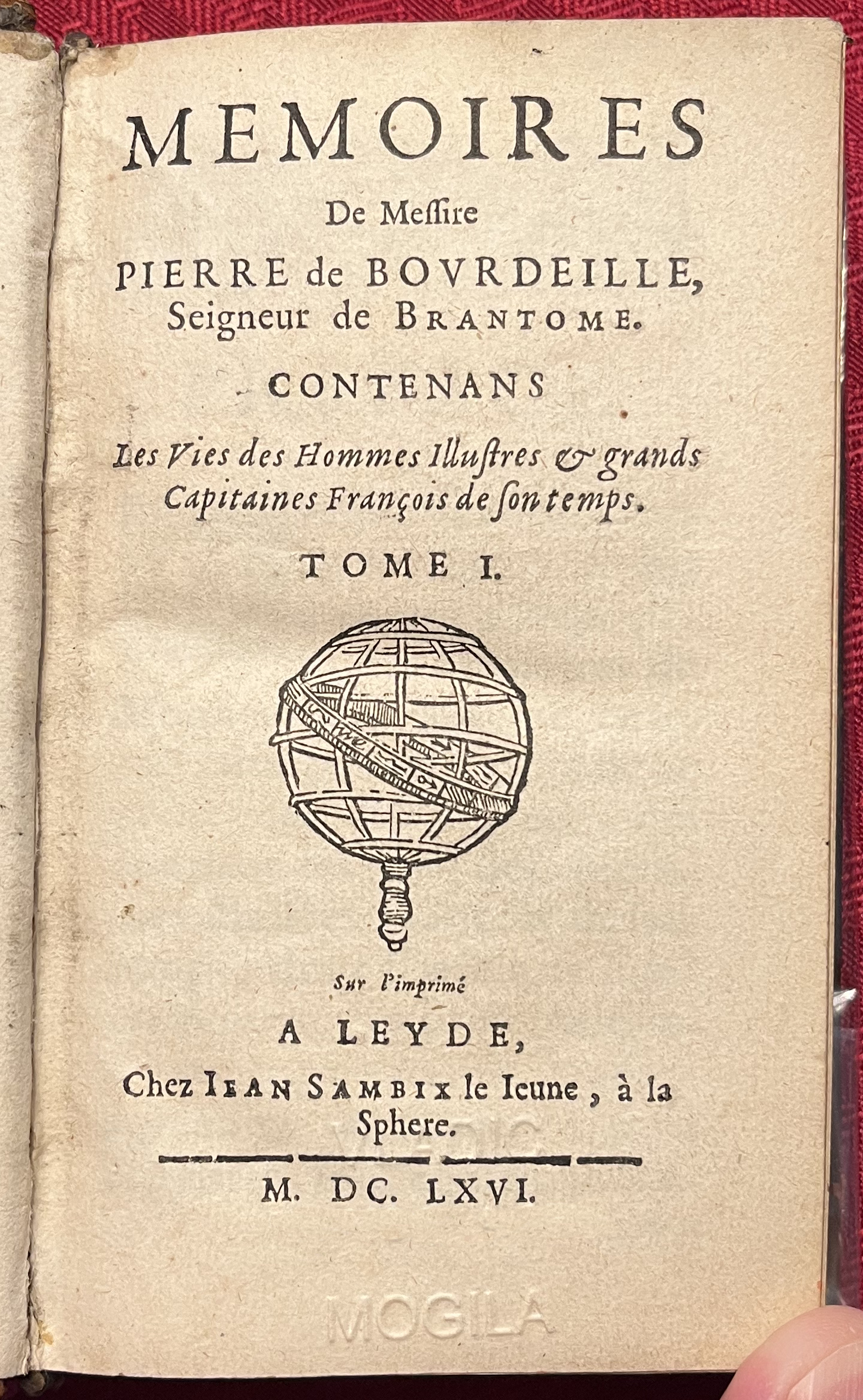
Memoires De Messire Pierre de Bourdeille, Seigneur de Brantome. First Edition, volume 1, 1666

He was given several benefices, the most important of which was the lay abbacy of Saint-Pierre de Brantôme, but had no inclination for an ecclesiastical career. He became a soldier and came into contact with many of the great leaders of the continental wars. He travelled in Italy; in Scotland, where he accompanied Mary, Queen of Scots (then the widow of Francis II of France); in England, where he saw Elizabeth I (1561, 1579); in Morocco, where he took part in Don García de Toledo's conquest of Badis (1564); and in Spain and Portugal.

Brantôme fought on the galleys of the Order of Malta, and accompanied his great friend, the French commander Filippo di Piero Strozzi, in the latter's expedition to Terceira, in which Strozzi was killed (1582). During the Wars of Religion under Charles IX, he fought for the Catholics (including at the siege of La Rochelle), but he allowed himself to be won over temporarily by the ideas of the Huguenot reformers. Though he publicly separated himself from Protestantism, it had a marked effect on his mind.

A fall from his horse compelled him to retire into private life about 1589, and he spent his last years in writing his Memoirs of the illustrious men and women whom he had known. He never married.

His life was the subject of the historical drama film Dames galantes (1990) that focused on his relations with women. The lead role was played by Richard Bohringer.

== Memoirs ==
Brantôme left distinct orders that his manuscript should be printed; a first edition appeared late (1665–1666) and not very complete. Later editions include:

- one in 15 volumes (1740)
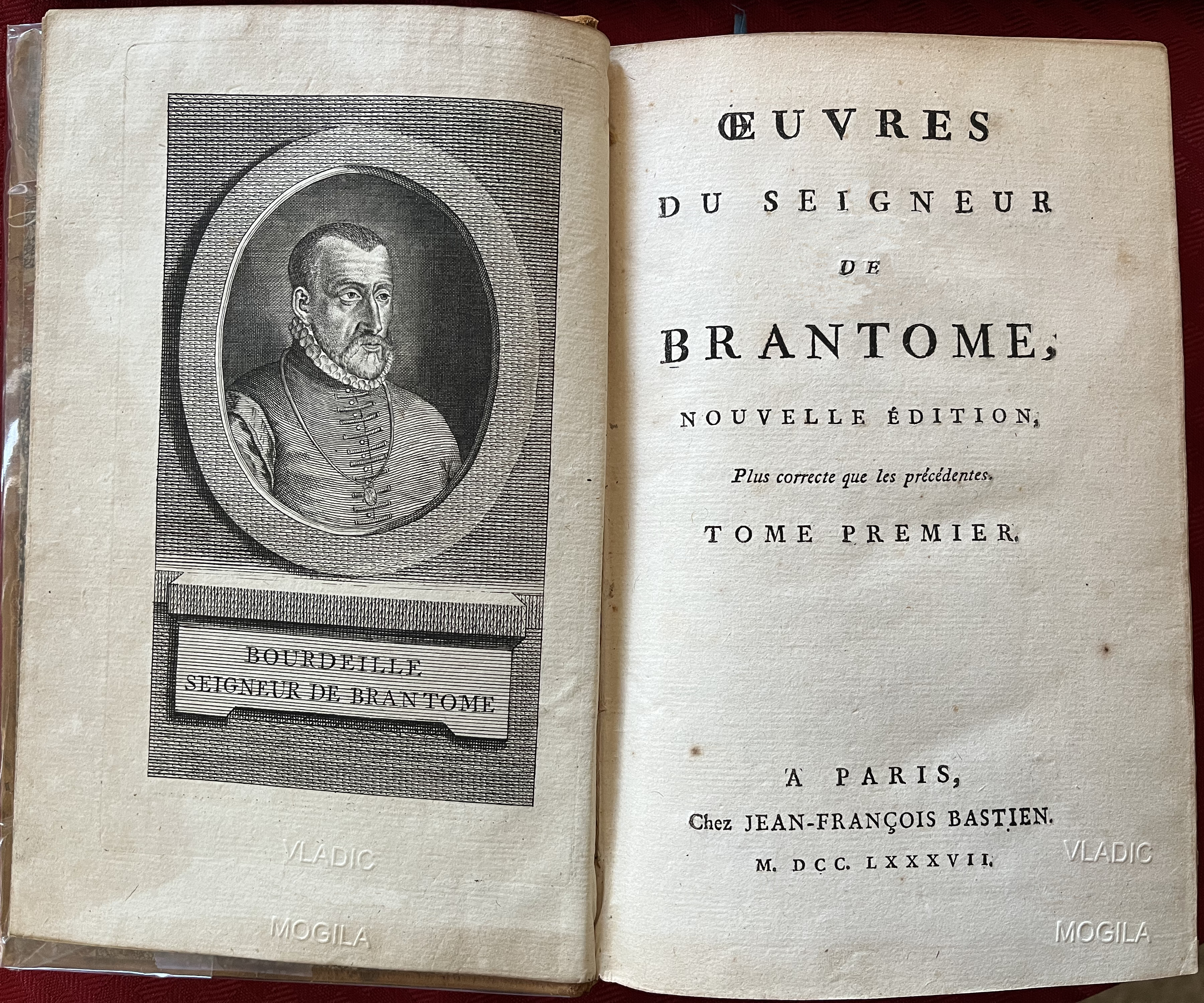
  OEuvres du Seigneur de Brantome, Nouvelle Édition, Plus correcte que les Précédentes. Tome Premier. A Paris, Chez Jean-François Bastien. M. DCC. LXXXVII.
- another by Louis Jean Nicolas Monmerque (1780–1860) in 8 volumes (1821–1824), reproduced in Buchon's Pantheon littéraire
- that of the Bibliothèque elzevirienne, begun (1858) by Prosper Mérimée and L. Lacour, and finished, with vol. xiii., only in 1893
- and Ludovic Lalanne's edition for the Société de l'histoire de France (12 vols, 1864–1896).

The work was published in two volumes by the Golden Cockerel Press under the title The Lives of the Gallant Ladies in 1924 with woodcuts by Robert Gibbings.
