= Louis Monmerqué =

French magistrate (1780–1860)

- Born: Louis Jean Nicolas Monmerqué; 6 December 1780; Paris
- Died: 27 February 1860 (aged 79); Paris
- Occupations: Magistrate; Man of letters

Louis-Jean-Nicolas Monmerqué (6 December 1780 – 27 February 1860) was a 19th-century French magistrate and man of letters.

== Biography ==
He wrote many biographical notices (Brantôme, (1823); Madame de Maintenon, (1828); Jean Ier, (1844), in-8°) and mostly editions of ancient documents (memoires and correspondences), including Collection de mémoires relatifs à l’histoire de France, depuis Henri IV jusqu’à la paix de Paris, with Petitot (1819–29, 130 vol. in-8°); Lettres de Mme de Sévigné (1818–19, 10 vol. in-8°), edition reworked by Ad. Régnier in the Collection des grands écrivains (1861–67, 11 vol. in-8°); Lettres choisies de Mme de Sévigné et de ses amis à l'usage de la jeunesse (1828, Paris, J. J. Blaise, 2 t. in-18°); Historiettes by Gédéon Tallemant des Réaux (1831, 6 vol. in-8°); Théâtre français du moyen âge, du XIe au XIVe (1839, in-8°), etc.

His works earned him his election at the Académie des inscriptions et belles-lettres in 1833.

He was twice married to heiresses of the old nobility. He is buried at Père Lachaise Cemetery (54th division)

== Sources ==
- Gustave Vapereau, Dictionnaire universel des littératures, Paris, Hachette, 1876, (p. 1424)
