= François Maynard =

French poet (1582–1646)

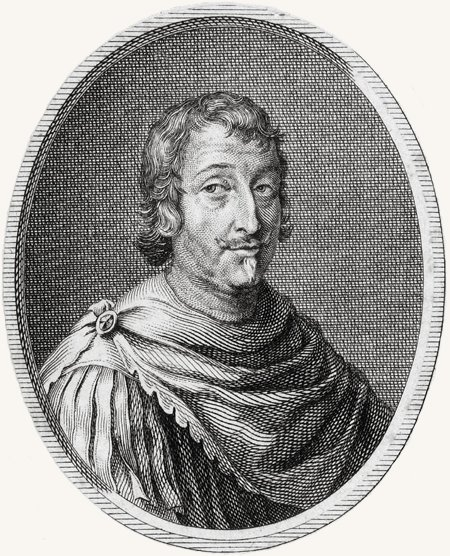
François Maynard

François Maynard, sometimes seen as "de Maynard" (21 November 1582 – 28 December 1646) was a French poet who spent much of his life in Toulouse.

== Biography ==
Maynard was born in Toulouse to a father who was conseiller in the parlement of the town. François was also trained for the law, becoming eventually president of Aurillac. He became secretary to Margaret of Valois, wife of Henry IV of France, for whom his early poems are written. He was a disciple of Malherbe, who said that in the workmanship of his lines he excelled Racan, but lacked his rival's energy.

In 1634 he accompanied the Cardinal de Noailles to Rome and spent about two years in Italy. On his return to France he made many unsuccessful efforts to obtain the favor of Cardinal Richelieu, but was obliged to retire to Toulouse. He never ceased to lament his exile from Paris and his inability to be present at the meetings of the Académie française, of which he was one of the earliest members. The best of his poems is in imitation of Horace, "Alcippe, reviens dans nos bois". He died at Toulouse in 1646.

His works consist of odes, epigrams, songs and letters, and were published in 1646 by Mann le Roy de Gomberville.

One of his famous poems is called "Le Nouveau Riche":

Pierre who during his youth,
Was a famous cobbler;
Is superb of his richness
And ashamed of his old trade.
This fortunate merchant of boots
Owns a park, close to my home,
Of which the fountains and the grottos
Are worthy of the houses of the king.
I am confused when I think
That he dug a canal there
By which the magnificent expense
would astonish the cardinal.
