= René Bary =

17-century French historiographer and rhetorician author

- Died: 1680
- Occupations: Historiographer and Rhetorician Author

René Bary (died in 1680) was a French historiographer and rhetorician author of La Rhétorique française où pour principale augmentation l'on trouve les secrets de nostre langue published in Paris (1653) for the female audience of the précieuses. He wrote many books to speak well and also La Défense de la jalousie in 1642.

== Publications (selection) ==
- 1642: La Défense de la jalousie
- 1653: La Rhétorique française où pour principale augmentation l'on trouve les secrets de nostre langue
- 1658: Actions publiques sur la rhétorique françoise
- 1660: La fine philosophie, accommodée à l'intelligence des dames
- 1662: L'esprit de cour, ou Les conversations galantes, divisées en cent dialogues... par René Bary
- 1679: Méthode pour bien prononcer un discours et pour le bien animer...
