= Paul Pellisson =

French author

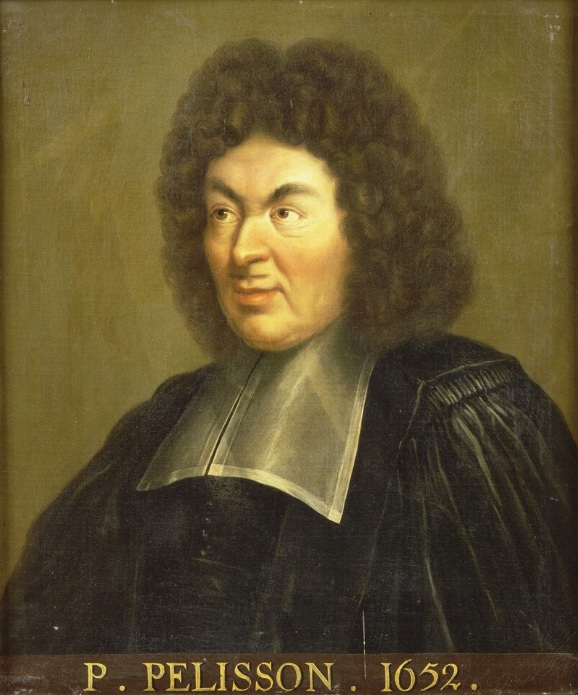
Paul Pellisson

Paul Pellisson (30 October 1624 – 7 February 1693) was a French writer, associated with the Baroque Précieuses movement.

Pellisson was born in Béziers, of a distinguished Calvinist family. He studied law at Toulouse, and practised at the bar of Castres. Going to Paris with letters of introduction to Valentin Conrart, a fellow Calvinist, he was introduced to the members of the Académie française. Pellisson undertook to be their historian, and in 1653 published a Relation contenant l'histoire de l’Académie française. He was rewarded with a promise of the next vacant place and permission to be present at their meetings.

In 1657 Pellisson became secretary to the minister of finance, Nicolas Fouquet, but when, in 1661, Fouquet was arrested, his secretary was imprisoned in the Bastille. Pellisson had the courage to stand by his fallen patron, in whose defence he issued his celebrated Mémoire in 1661, with the title Discours au roi, par un de ses fidèles sujets sur le procès de M. de Fouquet, in which the facts in favour of Fouquet are marshalled with great skill. Another pamphlet, Seconde défense de M. Fouquet, followed.

Pellisson was released in 1666, and sought the royal favour. He became official historian to the king, and in that capacity wrote a fragmentary Histoire de Louis XIV, covering the years 1660 to 1670. In 1670 he was converted to Catholicism and obtained rich ecclesiastical preferment.

He was very intimate with Mlle de Scudéry, in whose novels he figures as Herminius and Acante. He had many friends, and Bussy-Rabutin's described him as "encore plus honnête homme que bel esprit."
