= Précieuses =

French literary movement

The Précieuses (French: la préciosité [la pʁesjɔzite], i.e. "preciousness") was a 17th-century French literary style and movement. The main features of this style are the refined language of aristocratic salons, periphrases, hyperbole, and puns on the theme of gallant love. The movement was similar to the Italian marinism, Spanish culteranismo, and English euphuism.

== History ==
The movement arose in the 17th century from the lively conversations and playful word games of les précieuses (French pronunciation: [le pʁesjøz]), the intellectual, witty and educated women who frequented the salon of Catherine de Vivonne, marquise de Rambouillet. Her Chambre bleue (the "blue room" of her hôtel particulier) offered a Parisian refuge from the dangerous political factionalism and coarse manners of the royal court during the regency of Louis XIV.

One of the central figures of the salon that gathered at the Hôtel de Rambouillet was Madeleine de Scudéry. She wrote voluminous romance novels that embodied the refinements of preciosité including the concepts of feminine elegance, etiquette and courtly Platonic love that were hugely popular with female audiences, but scorned by most men, including Molière, who satirized the précieuses in his comedy Les Précieuses ridicules (1659). The "questions of love" that were debated in the précieuses' salons reflected the "courts of love" (fictional courts which judged lovers' behavior) that were a feature of medieval courtly love.

None of the women ever actually used or defined the term Précieuse themselves. Myriam Maître has found in préciosité not so much a listable series of characteristics "as an interplay of forces, a place to confront and resolve the tensions that extended through the century, the court and the field of literature". In assessing the career of Philippe Quinault, which began at the Hôtel de Bourgogne in 1653, Patricia Howard noted, "For if in French theatre in the second half of the century, women's roles are preeminent, it was the précieux movement which made them so."

One préciosité parlor game, the retelling of fairy tales as if spontaneously (though the tales were in fact carefully prepared), was to have great effects. Many of these fairy tales, in the préciosité style, were written, mostly notably by Madame d'Aulnoy. This fashion for fairy tales, and the writers themselves, were a notable influence later upon Charles Perrault, and Gabrielle-Suzanne Barbot de Villeneuve, the author of Beauty and the Beast. The stories tended to vary from the folk tradition, for example the characters were made to be of genteel origin. Whilst the heroes and heroines of fairy tales written by the précieuses often appeared as shepherds and shepherdesses, in pastoral settings, these figures were often secretly royal or noble.

The précieuses are also remembered through the filter of Molière's one-act satire, Les Précieuses ridicules (1659). After years touring the provinces, this bitter comedy of manners brought Molière and his company to the attention of Parisians and attracted the patronage of Louis XIV. Les Précieuses ridicules is considered to be the origin of the pejorative connotation of précieuse as "affected".

The phenomenon of the précieuses in establishing French literary classicism was first revived by Louis Roederer in 1838. His Mémoires pour servir à l'histoire de la société polie en France, evoked an atmosphere of nostalgia for the douceur de vivre of the Ancien Régime and the aristocratic leisure of its authors, at least for the upper classes. Later, Roxane, a critical character in Edmond Rostand's 1897 play Cyrano de Bergerac, is described as a précieuse.

René Bary (died in 1680) a French historiographer and rhetorician wrote La Rhétorique française où pour principale augmentation l'on trouve les secrets de nostre langue published in Paris in 1653 for the female audience of the précieuses.

== Significant authors ==
- Madame d'Aulnoy
- Jean-Louis Guez de Balzac
- Isaac de Benserade
- Charles Cotin
- Antoine Godeau
- Henriette-Julie de Murat
- Paul Pellisson
- Madeleine de Scudéry
- Honoré d'Urfé
- Vincent Voiture

== See also ==
- Rococo#Literature

== Sources ==
- Baldick, Chris (2015). "Préciosité, la". The Oxford Dictionary of Literary Terms (Online Version) (4th ed.). Oxford University Press. ISBN 9780191783234.
- Howard, Patricia. "The Influence of the Précieuses on Content and Structure in Quinault's and Lully's Tragédies Lyriques" Acta Musicologica 63.1 (January 1991), pp. 57–72.
- Howard, Patricia. "Quinault, Lully, and the Precieuses: Images of Women in Seventeenth-Century France." in Cecilia Reclaimed: Feminist Perspectives on Gender and Music ed. Susan C. Cook and Judy S. Tsou, editors, pp 70–89. Urbana: University of Illinois Press, 1994.
- Maître, Myriam. Les Précieuses: naissance des femmes de lettres en France au XVIIe siècle, H. Champion, collection "Lumière classique", Paris, 1999
