= Eight maps of Paris from Traité de la police =

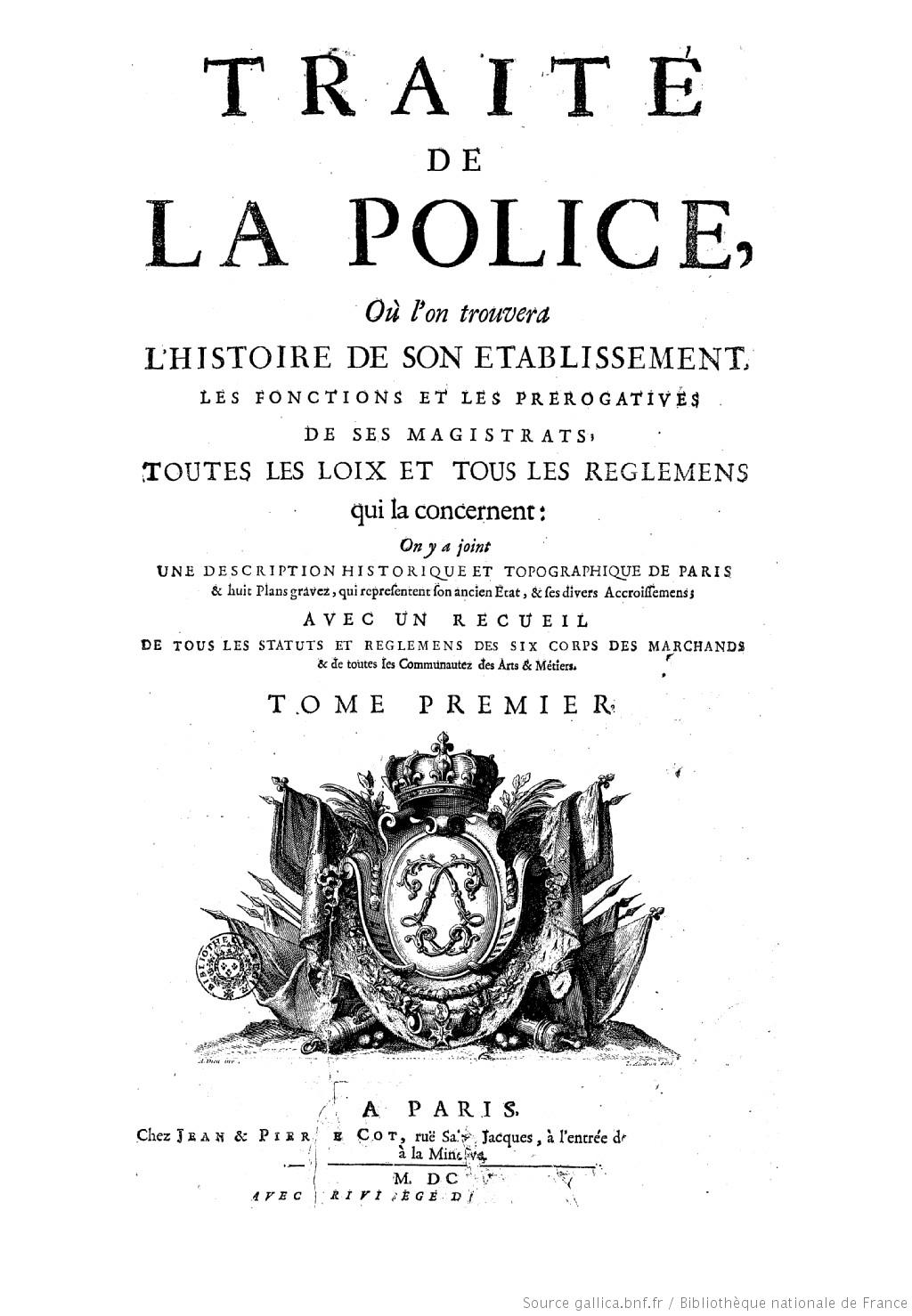
Title page of volume one

The chronological series of eight maps of Paris from Traité de la police ("Treatise on the Police") is among the earliest attempts to illustrate historical change with maps and shows the growth of Paris from Roman times up to 1705, the year of publication. By the 19th century, critics recognized that the maps were replete with historical inaccuracies.

== Description ==
The four-volume Traité de la police by Nicolas de La Mare (1639–1723), a Paris magistrate (commissaire) who specialized in urban problems and services, is a pioneering work of urban administration. The eight maps were included in the first volume, published in 1705, to accompany a discussion of the historical basis of the plans. The three subsequent volumes were published in 1710, 1719, and 1738.

Each map is about 44 x 55 cm with a similar layout and scale (approximately 1 to 9,500). Goffart states that, although the authorship of the maps is not certainly established, "notwithstanding dissent", Antoine Coquart (1668–1707) likely designed and engraved the first seven maps, using information and materials provided by La Mare, while Nicolas de Fer was the engraver of the eighth, which was based on a contemporary city map.

The maps proved popular and were frequently reproduced and sold. Goffart believes that about 1715, de Fer copied the entire set of eight and published them by his own name, and is therefore sometimes credited as the sole author. By the 19th century critics recognized the many errors in the maps and sometimes described them as "fanciful" and "imaginary".

== List of maps ==
The titles of the eight maps are:

1. Lutèce, ou premier plan de la ville de Paris. Tiré De Cesar, de Strabon, de l'Empereur Iulien, et d'Ammian Marcellin par MLCDLM [Monsieur Le Commissaire De La Mare] ("Lutetia, or first map of the city of Paris. Drawn [based on information] from Caesar, from Strabo, from the Emperor Julian, and from Ammianus Marcellinus by the Commissioner De La Mare")
2. Lutèce conquise par les François sur les Romains, ou second plan de la ville de Paris ("Lutetia conquered by the Franks from the Romans, or second map of the city of Paris")
3. Troisième plan de la ville de Paris, son étendue et les bourgs dont elle toit environnée sous le Regne de Loüis le jeune VII^{e} du nom ("Third plan of the city of Paris, its extent and the boroughs in its environs in the reign of Louis the Young VIIth of that name")
4. Quatrième plan de la ville de Paris, son accroissement, et l'état ou elle êtoit sous le Regne de Philippe Auguste, qui mourut l'an 1223 ("Fourth map of the city of Paris. Its growth, and the state or its condition in the reign of Philip Augustus, who died the year 1223")
5. Cinquième plan de la ville de Paris. Son accroissement, et sa Quatrieme Clôture commandée sous Charles V l'an 1367 et finie sous Charles VI l'an 1383 ("Fifth map of the city of Paris. Its growth, and its fourth enclosure, commanded by Charles V the year 1367 and finished under Charles VI the year 1383")
6. Sixième plan de la ville de Paris, et ses accroissements, depuis le commencement du Régne de Charles VII l'an 1422 jusqu'a la fin du Régne d'Henry III l'an 1589 ("Sixth map of the city of Paris, and its additions, from the commencement of the reign of Charles VII in the year 1422 until the finish of the reign of Henry III the year 1589")
7. Septième plan de la ville de Paris, son accroissement et ses embelisssemens sous Henry IIII et Louis XIII depuis 1589 jusqu'en 1643 ("Seventh plan of the city of Paris, its growth and its embellishments under Henry IIII and Louis III from 1589 until 1643")
8. Huitième plan de Paris divisé en ses vingts quartiers. Par N. de Fer, Geographe de sa Majesté Catolique, et de Monseigneur le Dauphin ("Eighth plan of Paris divided into its 20 quarters. By N de Fer, Geographer to his Majesty Catholic [Louis XIV], and the Monseigneur le Dauphin")

== Gallery ==
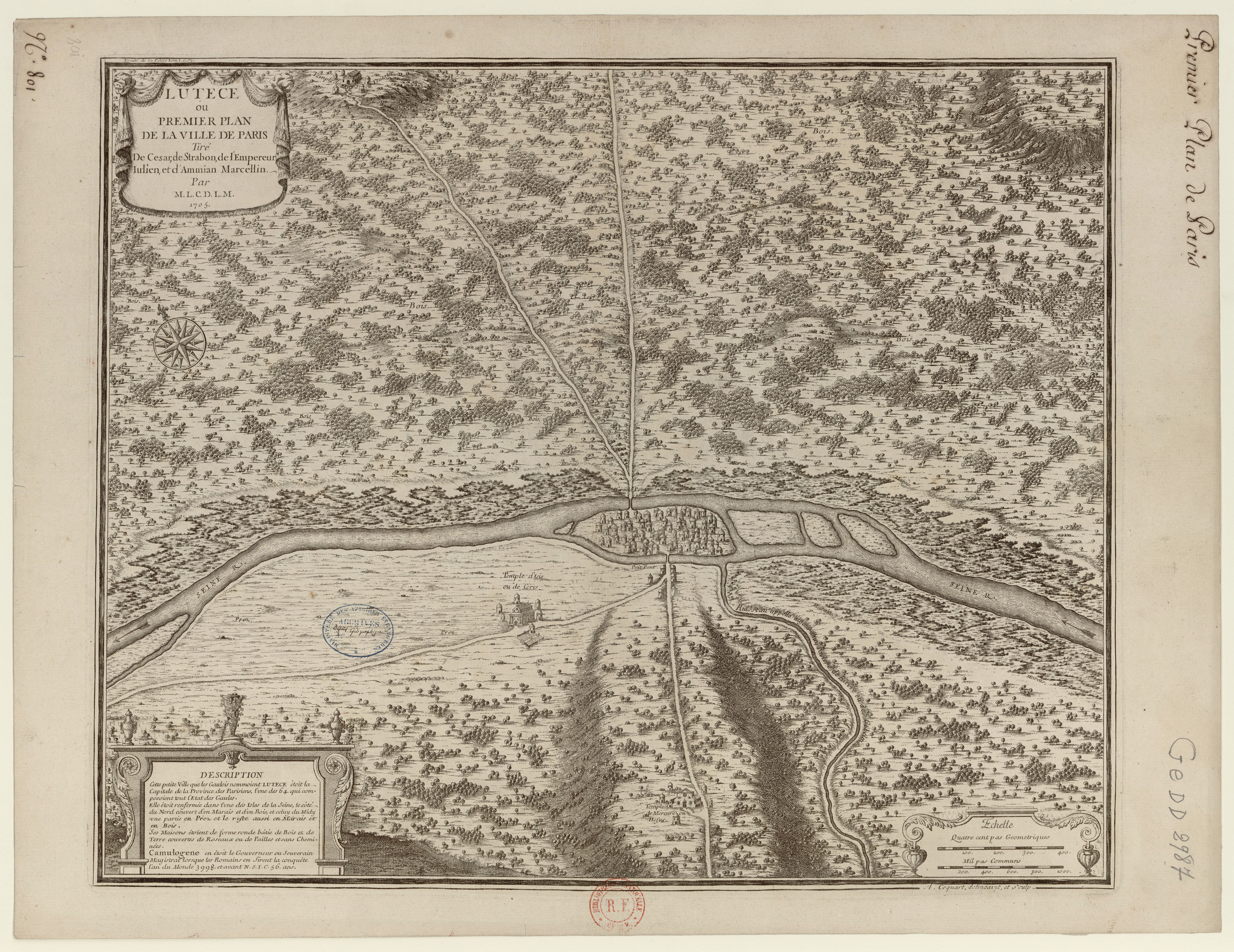
First Map (Roman Empire)

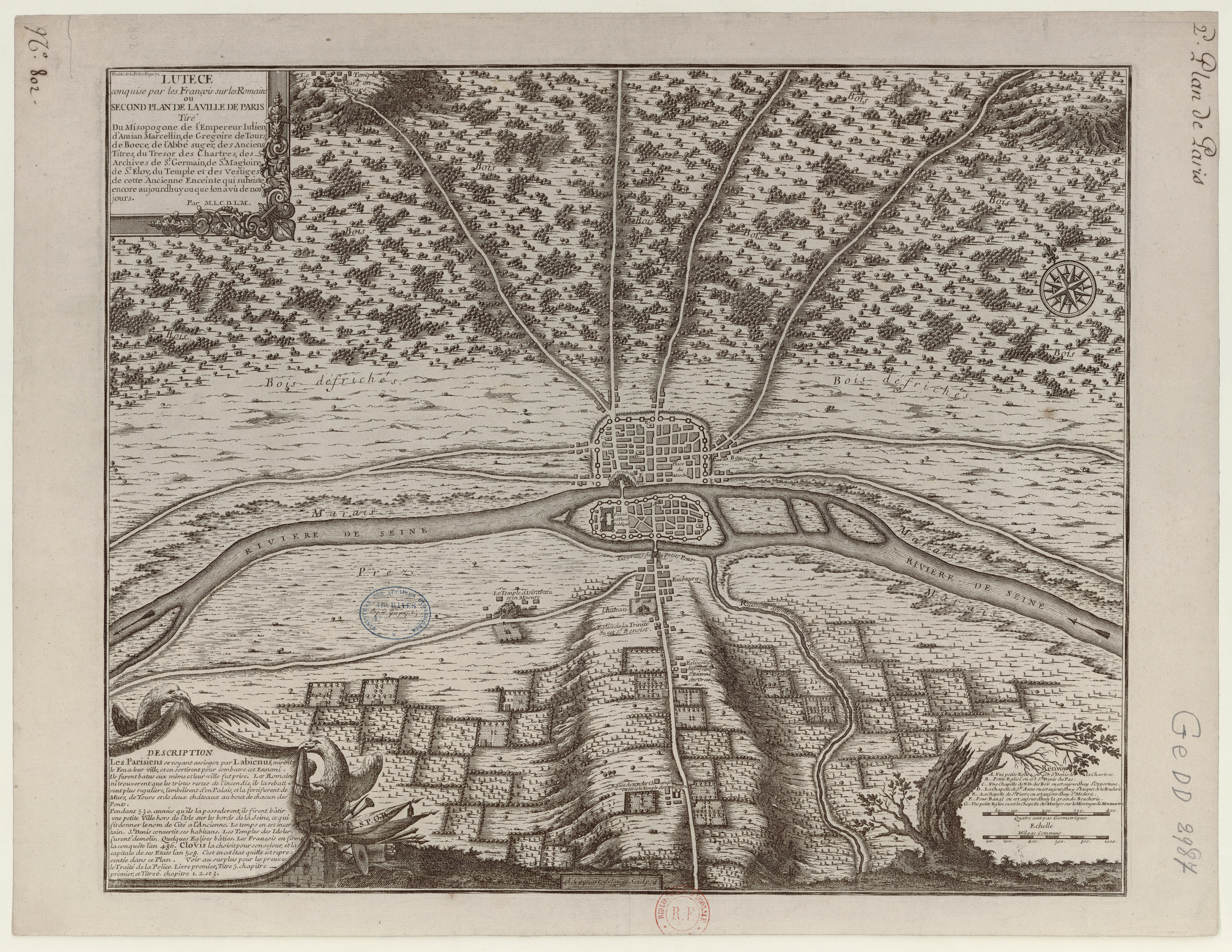
Second Map (c. 508)

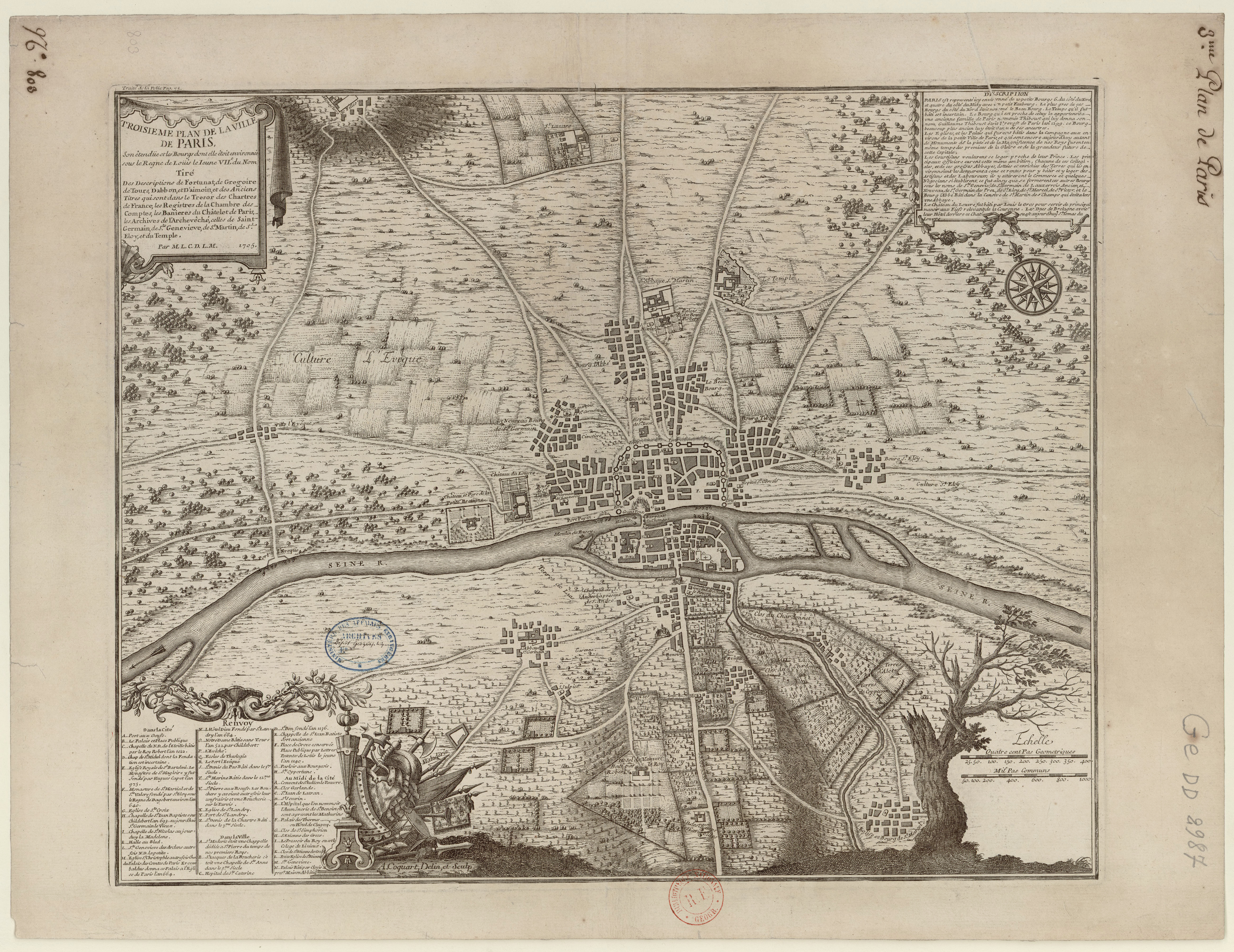
Third Map (1180)

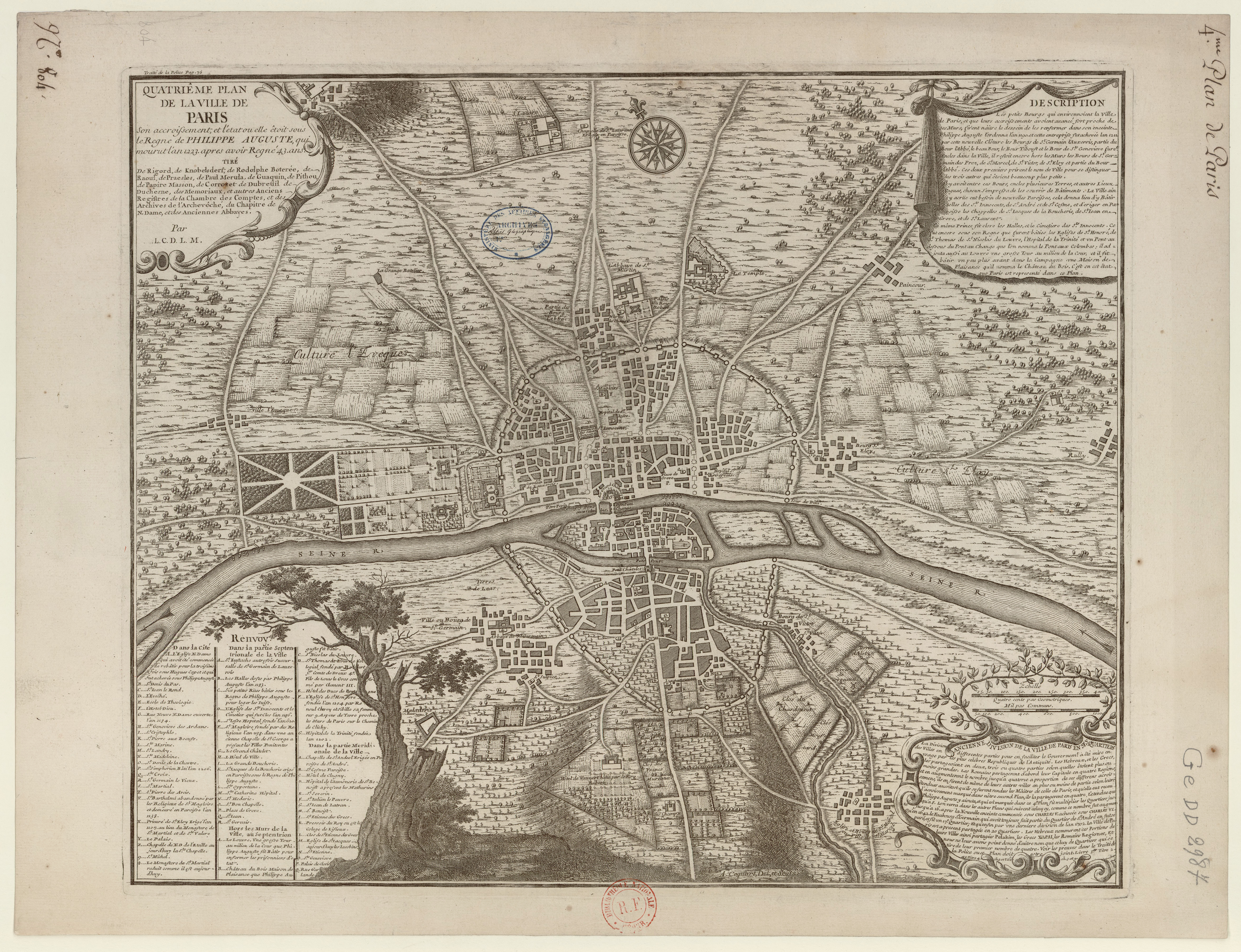
Fourth Map (1223)

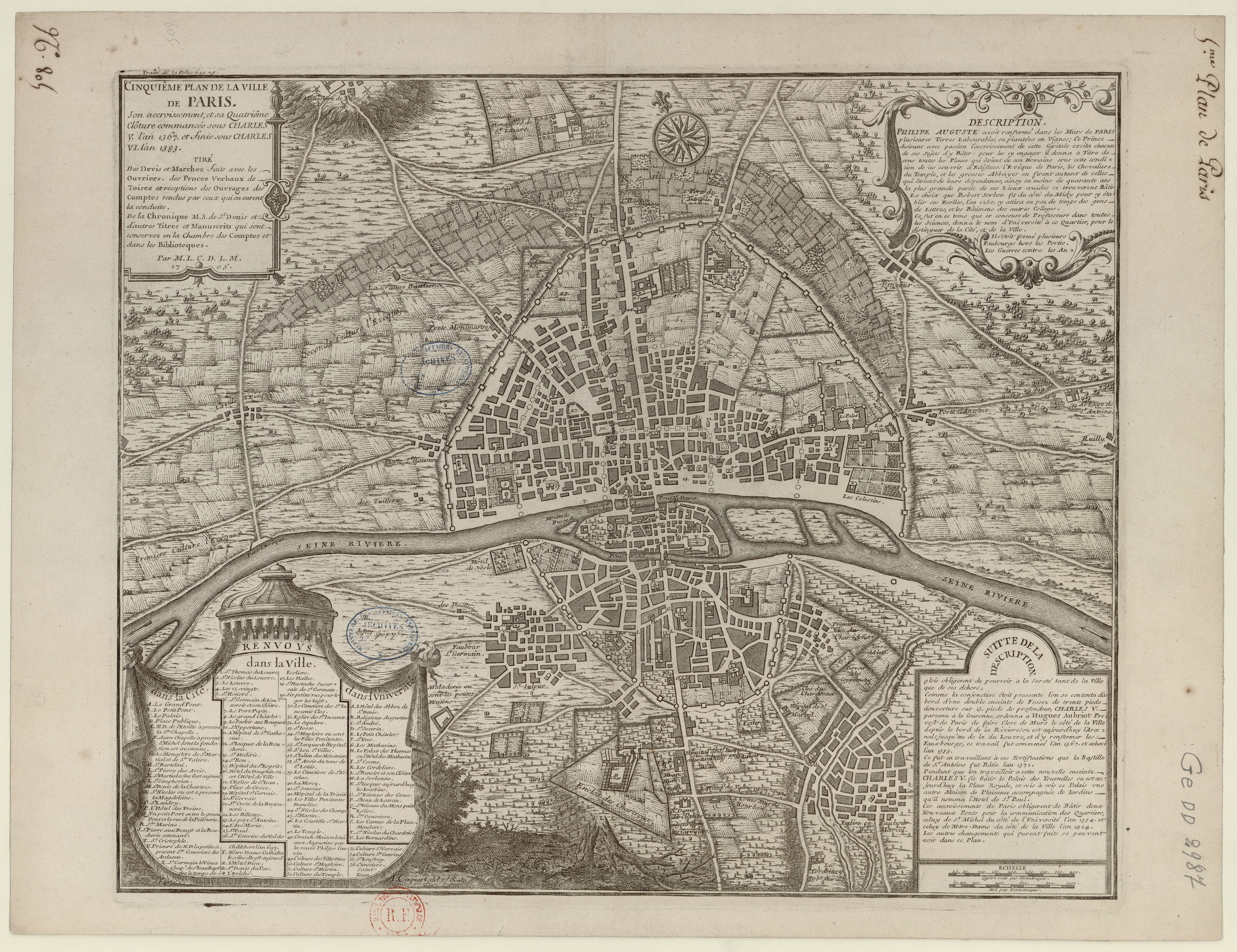
Fifth Map (1383)

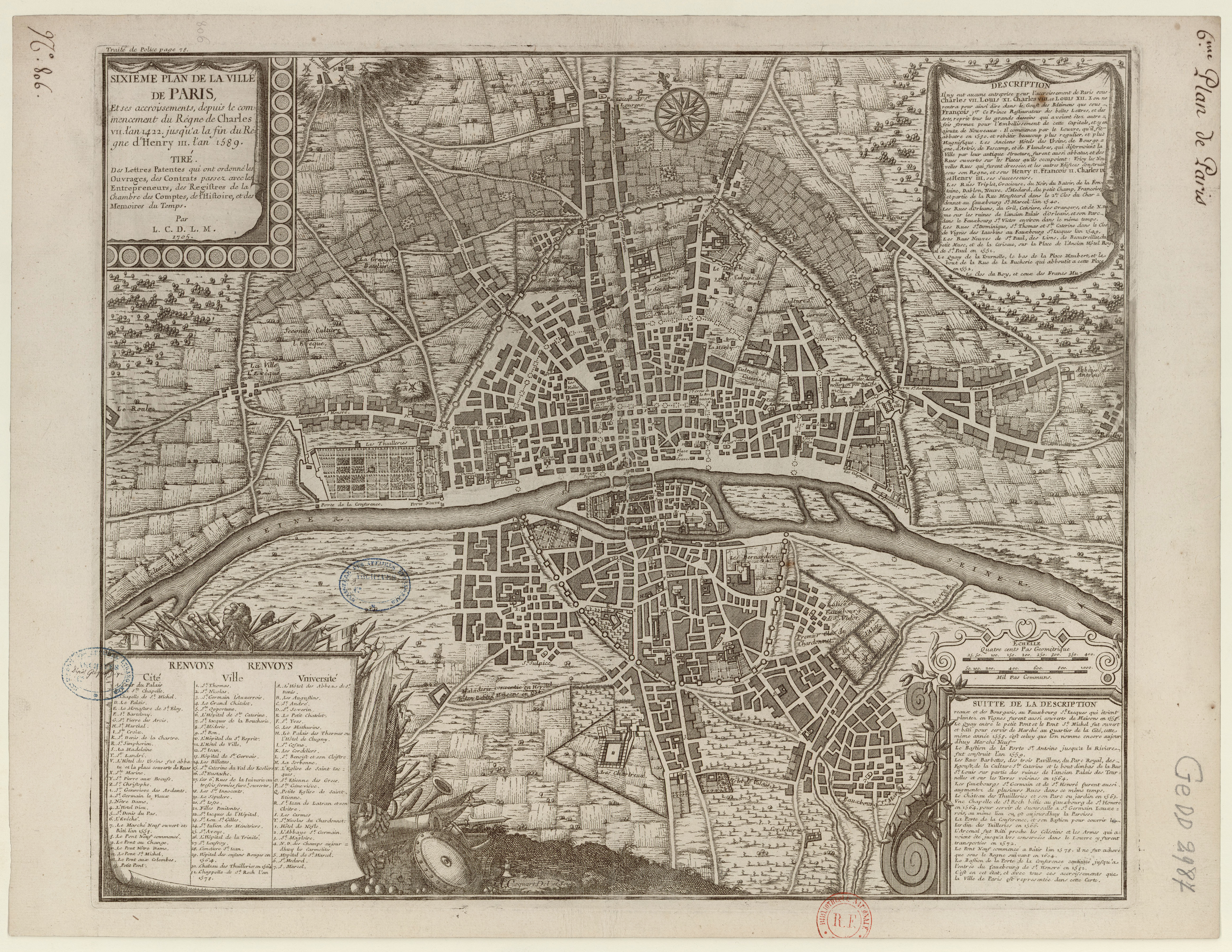
Sixth Map (1589)

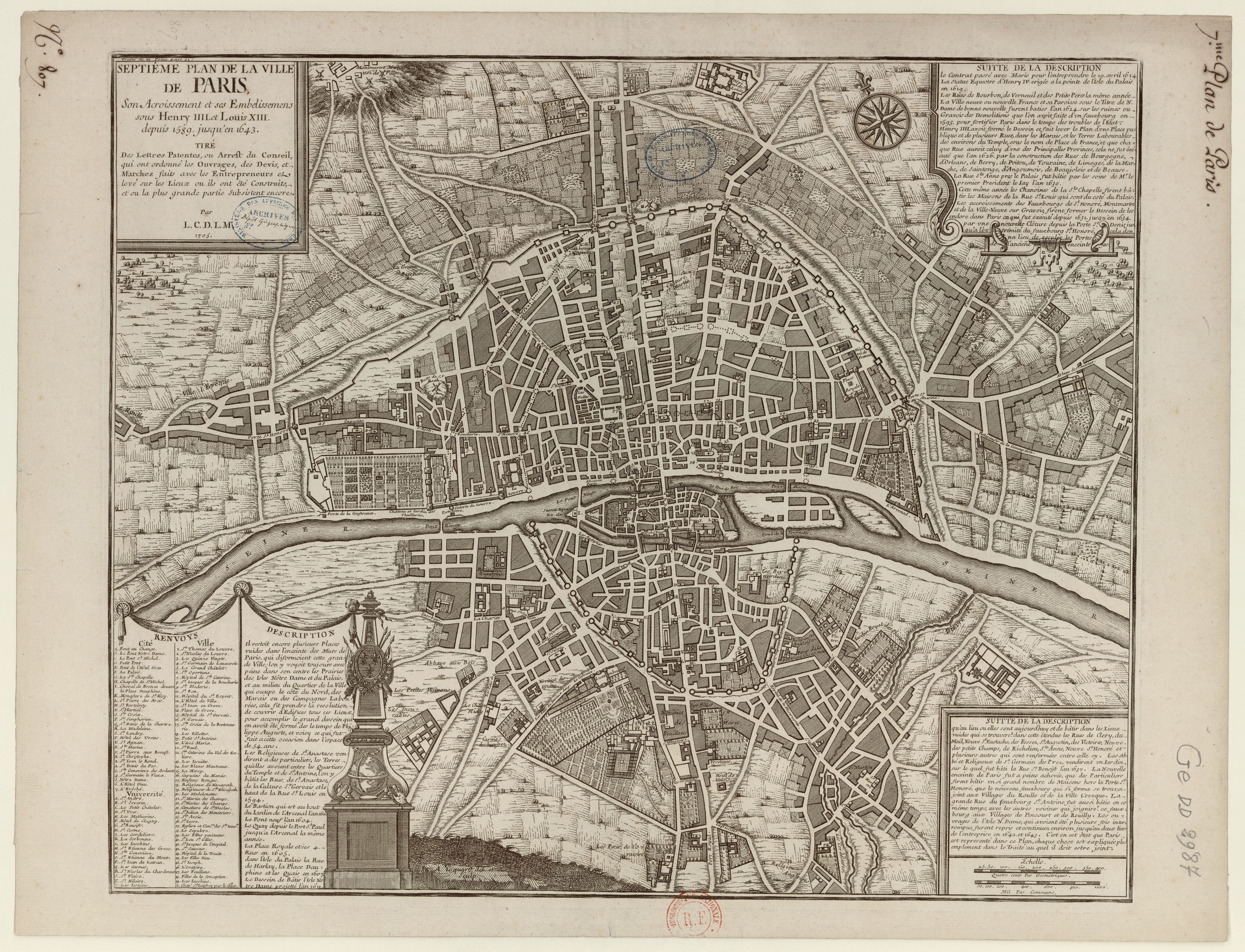
Seventh Map (1643)

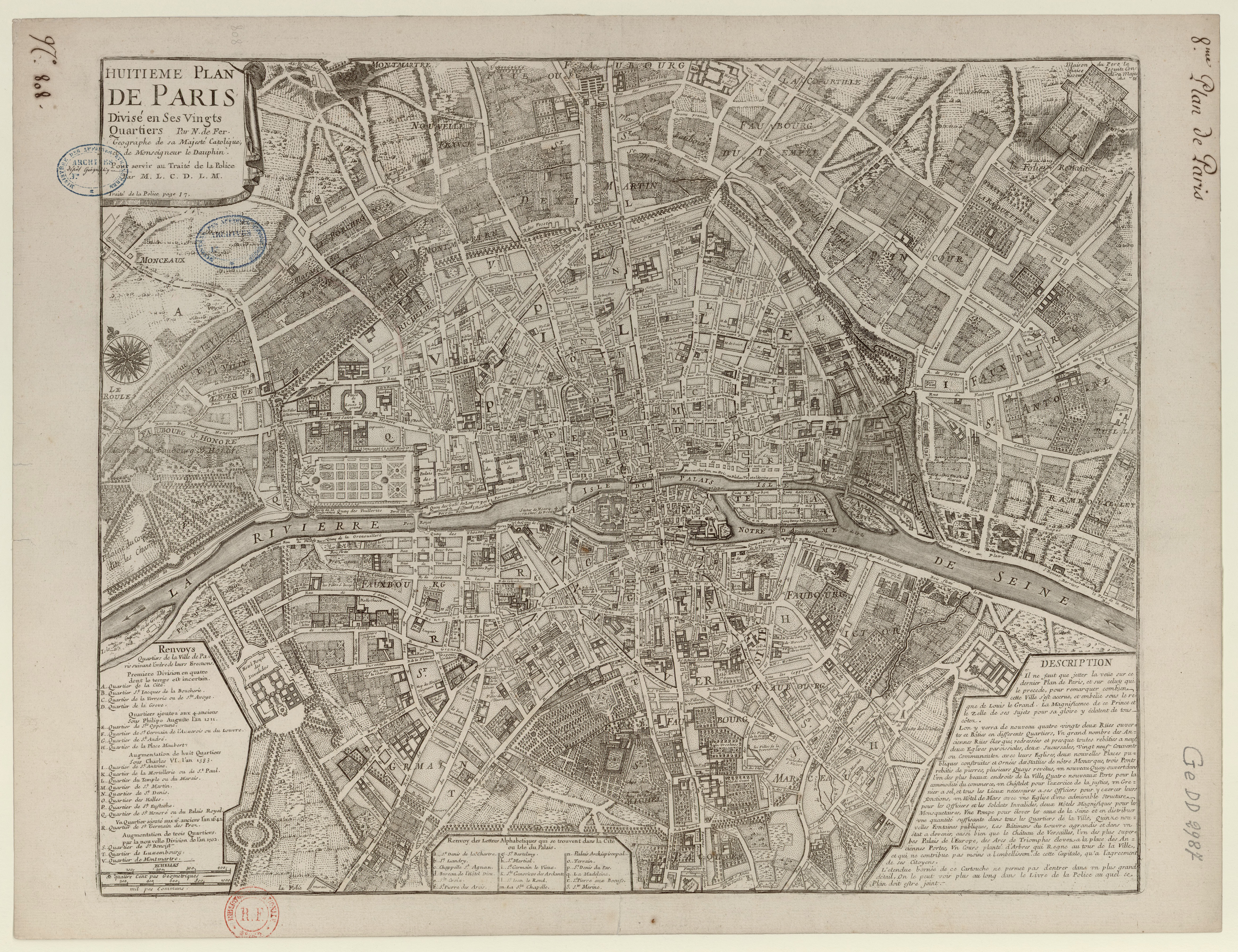
Eighth Map (1705)

== Ninth map in volume 4 ==
Ninth Map (1735), added to volume 4 of Traité de la Police.

After Nicolas de La Mare's death in 1723, a ninth map was added to volume 4, which appeared in 1738. The preparation of the ninth map was carried out under Abbé Jean Delagrive (1689–1757). There are three known versions of the map dated 1733, 1735, and 1737. On the map the name of the author of vol. 4 is given as "M. L. C. D. B." [Monsieur Anne-Louis Le Cler Du Brillet]. His name also appears as the signature at the end of the 'Epistre' [modern spelling: épître, preliminary letter of dedication] to that volume.

== Sources ==
- Boutier, Jean (2007). Les Plans de Paris des origines (1493) à la fin de XVIIIe siècle, second edition. Paris: Bibliothèque nationale de France. ISBN 9782717723892.
- Goffart, Walter (2003). Historical Atlases: The First Three Hundred Years, 1570–1870. Chicago: The University of Chicago Press. ISBN 9780226300719.
