= Claude Favre de Vaugelas =

Savoyard grammarian and man of letters

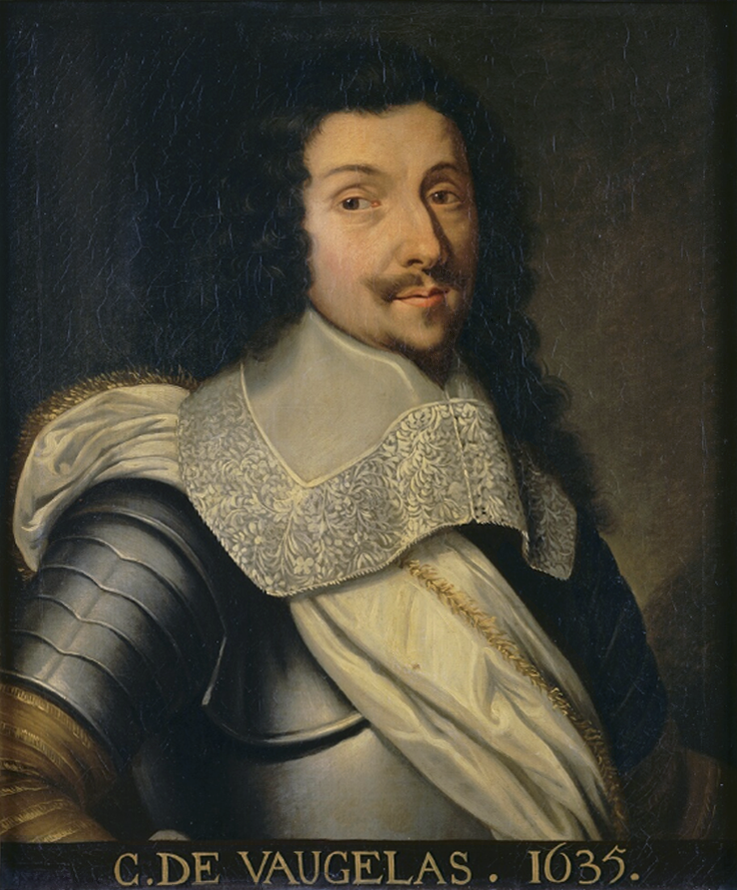
17th-century portrait of Vaugelas

Claude Favre de Vaugelas (6 January 1585 – 26 February 1650) was a Savoyard grammarian and man of letters. Although a lifelong courtier, Claude Favre was widely known by the name of one of the landed estates he owned as seigneur of Vaugelas and baron of Peroges.

Born at Meximieux, in the Duchy of Savoy, he became gentleman-in-waiting to Gaston, Duke of Orléans, and continued faithful to this prince in his disgrace, although his fidelity cost him a pension from the crown on which he was largely dependent. His father was the distinguished president Antoine Favre and his mother bore the same name as her husband (Favre). She got the Vaugelas estate, by birth.

His thorough knowledge of the French language and the correctness of his speech won him a place among the original members of the Académie française in 1634. On the representation of his colleagues his pension was restored so that he might have leisure to pursue his Remarques sur la langue française (1647). In this work he maintained that words and expressions were to be judged by the current usage of the best society, of which, as a regular of the Hôtel de Rambouillet, Vaugelas was a competent judge. He shares with François de Malherbe the credit of having purified French diction. His book fixed the current usage, and the classical writers of the 17th century regulated their practice by it.

Protests against the academical doctrine were not lacking. Scipion Dupleix in his Liberté de la langue française dans sa pureté (1651) pleaded for the richer and freer language of the 16th century, and François de La Mothe-Le-Vayer took a similar standpoint in his Lettres à Gabriel Naudé tombant les Remarques sur la langue française.

Towards the end of his life Vaugelas became tutor to the sons of Thomas Francis of Savoy, Prince of Carignano. He died in Paris in February 1650.

His translation from Quintus Curtius, La Vie d'Alexandre (posthumously published in 1653), deserves notice as an application of the author's own rules.
