= Jean-Louis Guez de Balzac =

French writer of epistolary essays

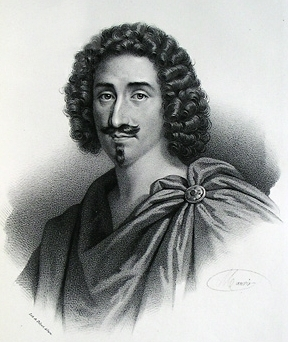
Guez de Balzac

Jean-Louis Guez de Balzac (31 May 1597 – 18 February 1654) was a French author in Baroque Précieuses style, best known for his epistolary essays, which were widely circulated and read in his day. He was one of the founding members of the Académie française.

== Life and career ==
Guez de Balzac was born at Angoulême. Originally thought to have been born in 1595, the date was revised in 1848 upon the discovery of a baptismal certificate dated June 1, 1597, although this is still controversial because his birth certificate contained several irregularities. He was born in a well off bourgeois family, which also had acquired noble titles. In his youth, he studied at two Jesuit colleges in Angoulême and Poitiers, where he learned Latin well, especially rhetoric.

In 1612, he met Théophile de Viau when de Viau's troupe visited Angoulême, and fled from home with the troupe. The two traveled together with the troupe for some time, but when the troupe arrived at Leiden, they enrolled as students at the city's university in May 1615, although it's possible that they visited the university in 1613 as well.

His letters to his acquaintances and to important courtiers gained him a great reputation. Compliments were showered on him, and he became an habitué of the literary salong of Catherine de Vivonne, Marquise de Rambouillet at the Hôtel de Rambouillet. In 1624 a collection of his Lettres was published, and was received with great favour. From Chateau de Balzac, where he had retired, he continued to correspond with Jean Chapelain, Valentin Conrart and others.

In 1634 Balzac was elected to the Académie française. He died at Angoulême twenty years later.

Guez de Balzac's fame rests chiefly upon the Lettres, a second collection of which appeared in 1636. Recueil de nouvelles lettres was printed in the next year. His letters, though empty and affected in matter, show a real mastery of style, introducing a new clearness and precision into French prose and encouraging the development of the language on national lines by emphasizing its most idiomatic elements. Balzac has thus the credit of executing in French prose a reform parallel to François de Malherbe's in verse. In 1631 he published a eulogy of King Louis XIII entitled Le Prince; in 1652 the Socrate chrétien, and Aristippe ou de la Cour in 1658.

Since 1962, his name is given to the Lycée Guez-de-Balzac in Angoulême (Charente, France).
