= Madeleine de Scudéry =

French writer (1607–1701)

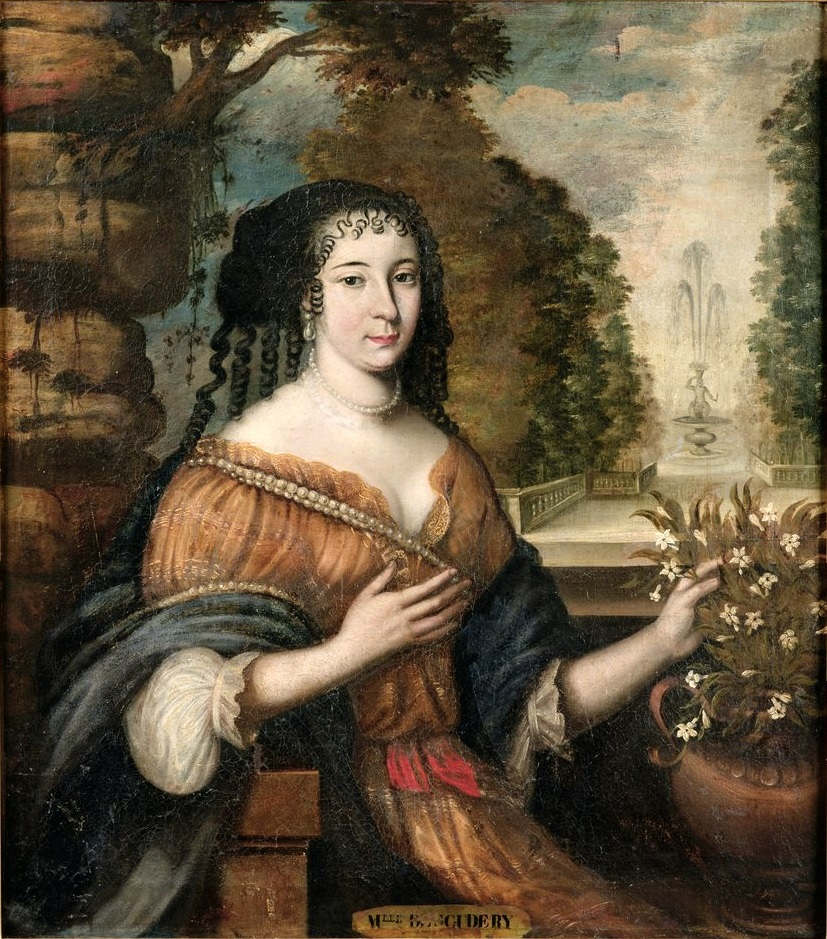
- Madeleine de Scudéry
- Born: 15 November 1607; Le Havre, Normandy, Kingdom of France
- Died: 2 June 1701 (aged 93); Paris, Kingdom of France
- Writing career
- Language: French
- Genre: Roman à clef
- Literary movement: Précieuses

Madeleine de Scudéry (French: [madlɛn də skydeʁi]; 15 November 1607 – 2 June 1701), often known simply as Mademoiselle de Scudéry ([madmwazɛl də skydeʁi]), was a French writer.

Her works demonstrate such comprehensive knowledge of ancient history that it is suspected she had received instruction in Greek and Latin. In 1637, following the death of her uncle, Scudéry established herself in Paris with her brother, Georges de Scudéry, who became a playwright. Madeleine often used her older brother's name, George, to publish her works. She was at once admitted to the Hôtel de Rambouillet coterie of préciosité, and afterwards established a salon of her own under the title of the Société du samedi (Saturday Society). For the last half of the 17th century, under the pseudonym of Sapho or her own name, she was acknowledged as the first bluestocking of France and of the world. She formed a close romantic relationship with Paul Pellisson which was only ended by his death in 1693. She never married.

== Biography ==
Born at Le Havre, Normandy, in northern France, she was without fortune, but she was exceedingly well-educated. Her father, captain of the port in Le Havre, died in 1613 with her mother following shortly after. Madeleine and her brother Georges de Scudéry were placed in the care of an uncle who cared for them very well. He gave Madeleine an abnormally well-rounded education: she studied writing, spelling, drawing, dancing, painting, and needlework. In addition, on her own, Madeleine studied agriculture, medicine, cooking, Spanish, and Italian.

== Works ==
Her lengthy novels, such as Artamène, ou le Grand Cyrus (10 vols., 1648–53), Clélie (10 vols., 1654–61), Ibrahim, ou l'illustre Bassa (4 vols., 1641), Almahide, ou l'esclave reine (8 vols., 1661–63) were the delight of Europe, commended by other literary figures such as Madame de Sévigné. Artamène, which contains about 2.1 million words, ranks among the longest novels ever published. Her novels derive their length from endless conversations and, as far as incidents go, successive abductions of the heroines, conceived and told decorously. Contemporary readers also enjoyed these novels because they gave a glimpse into the life of important society figures. These figures were often disguised as Persian, Greek, and Roman warriors and maidens. In fact, Scudéry created the roman à clef to provide a forum for her thinly veiled fiction featuring political and public figures.

Les Femmes Illustres (1642) addresses itself to women and defends education, rather than the beauty or cosmetic, as a means of social mobility for women. This text was a means to justify women's participation in rhetoric and literary culture. It uses women speakers as models for the speeches, including Cleopatra of Egypt. In Les Femmes Illustres (1642), Conversations Sur Divers Sujets (1680), and Conversations Nouvelles sur Divers Sujets, Dediees Au Roy (1684), Madeleine de Scudéry adapted classical rhetorical theory from Cicero, Quintilian, Aristotle, and the sophists to a theory of salon conversation and letter writing. Scudéry's Conversations Sur Divers Sujets, included dialogues covering "Conversation," "The Art of Speaking," "Raillery," "Invention," and "The Manner of Writing Letters." This text offers the rhetoric of salon conversation and model scenarios where women take intellectual control of the conversation. Other works devoted to conversations, pertaining to the education of women include: "The Slave Queen" (1660), "Mathilda of Aguilar, a Spanish Tale," (1667), and "The Versailles Promenade, or the Tale of Celanire" (1669). These covered the art of speaking, invention, the manner of writing letters, and scenarios where women had control of the intellectual conversation.

Scudéry's novels are usually set in the classical world or "the Orient", but their language and action reflect fashionable ideas of the 17th century, and the characters can be identified with Mademoiselle de Scudéry's contemporaries. In Clélie, Herminius represents Paul Pellisson; Scaurus and Lyriane were Paul Scarron and his wife (who became Mme de Maintenon); and in the description of Sapho in vol. 10 of Le Grand Cyrus the author paints herself.

In Clélie, Scudéry invented the famous Carte de Tendre, a map of an Arcadia where the geography is all based around the theme of love: the river of Inclination flows past the villages of "Billet Doux" (love letter), "Petits Soins" (Little Trinkets) and so forth. Scudéry was a skilled conversationalist; several volumes purporting to report her conversations upon various topics were published during her lifetime. She had a distinct vocation as a pedagogue.

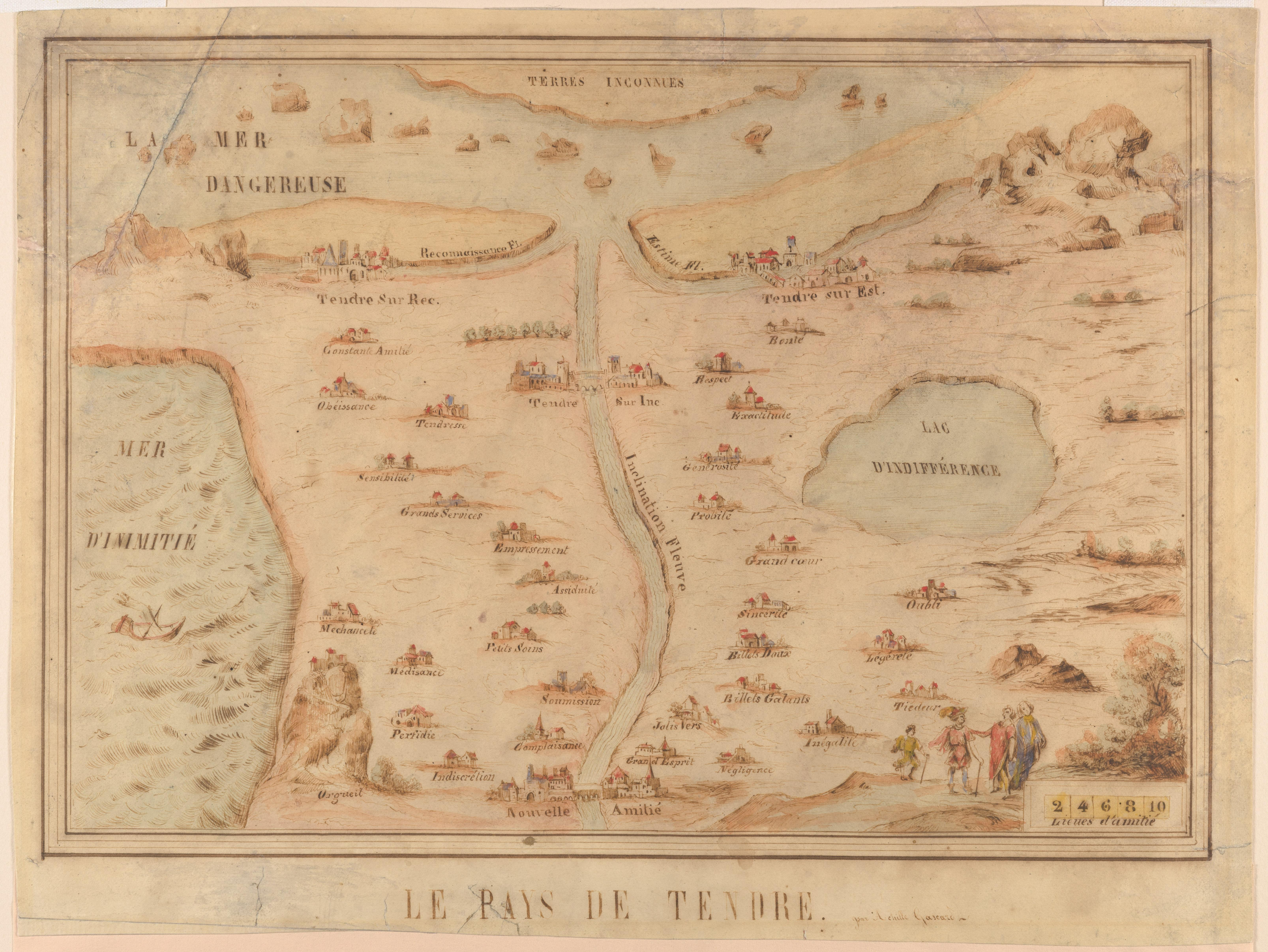
The Carte de Tendre was "conceived as a social game during the Winter of 1653–1654" by Madeleine de Scudery, and a printed copy was "later incorporated into the first volume of her coded novel, Clelie." (Reitinger 1999, 109).

== Later years ==
Madeleine survived her brother by more than thirty years, and in her later days published numerous volumes of conversations, to a great extent extracted from her novels, thus forming a kind of anthology of her work. Scudéry was deaf for the last 40 years of her life. She outlived her vogue to some extent, but retained a circle of friends, like Marie Dupré, to whom she was always the "incomparable Sapho."

Her Life and Correspondence was published at Paris by MM. Rathery and Boutron in 1873.

== Legacy ==
Madeleine de Scudéry was part of a movement in the late Renaissance in England and France where women used classical rhetorical theory for their own. She revised discourse to be modeled on conversation rather than public speaking, favoring that as a means of rhetoric, the speaker in the salon built on the ideas of the speaker before them, opting for consensus rather than argument. She is one of the central figures associated with the "salon" conversation and letter writing.

== Cultural references ==
Controversial in her own era, Mademoiselle de Scudéry was satirized by Molière in his plays Les Précieuses ridicules (1659) and Les Femmes savantes (1672) and by Antoine Furetière in his Roman Bourgeois (1666).

Arabella, the protagonist of Charlotte Lennox's 1752 novel, The Female Quixote, mistakenly believes that the romances written by Madamoiselle de Scudery are historically accurate accounts of antiquity that also reflect the realities of contemporary life. After she is visited by a clergyman towards the end of the novel, Arabella comes to the conclusion that de Scudery's works are ridiculous, frivolous and unhealthy.

The 19th century German writer E.T.A. Hoffmann wrote what is usually referred to as the first German-language detective story, featuring Scudéry as the central figure. "Das Fräulein von Scuderi" (Mademoiselle de Scudery) is still widely read today, and is the origin of the "Cardillac syndrome" in psychology.

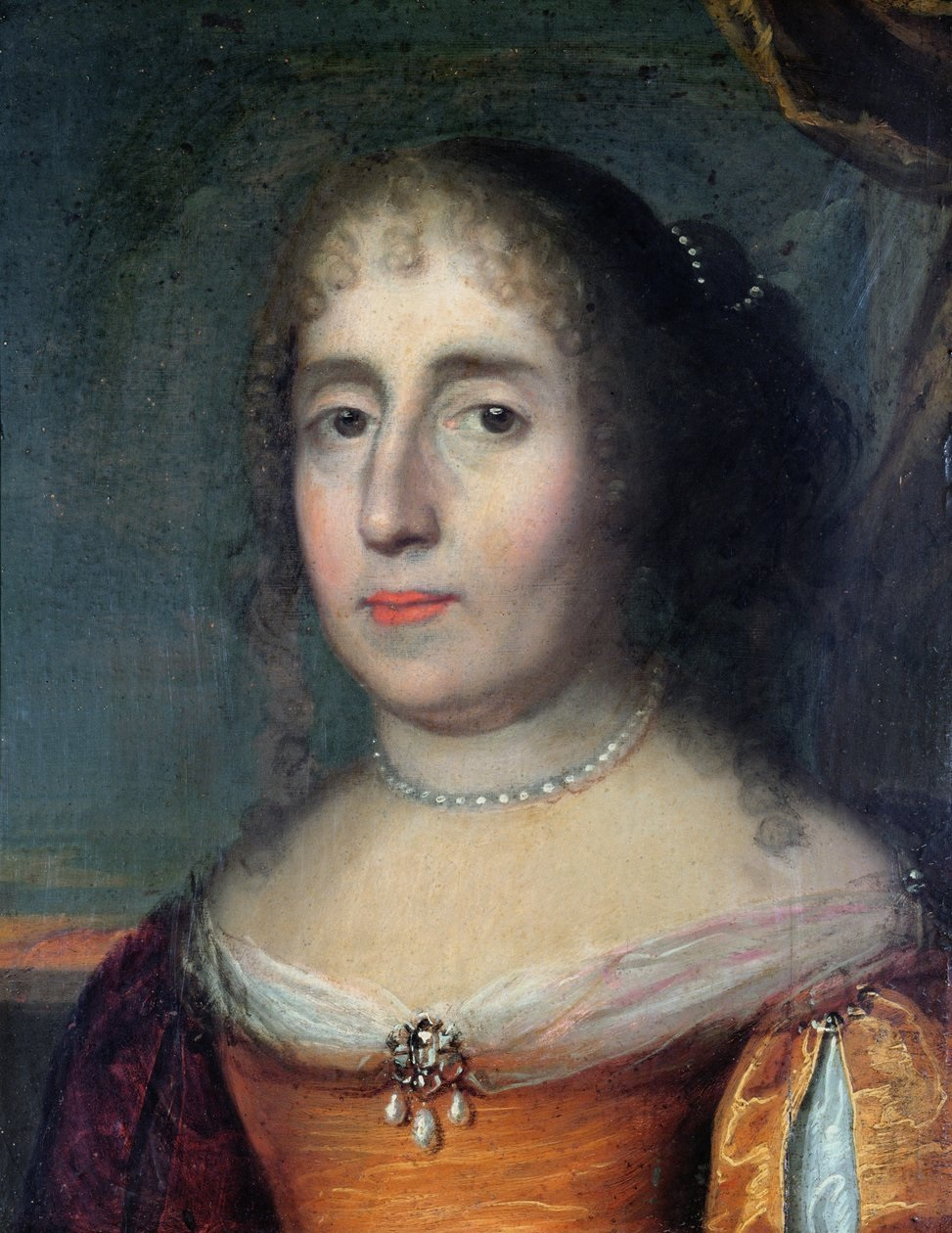
An older Madeleine de Scudéry

Mademoiselle de Scudéry is also featured prominently in Madeleine: One of Love's Jansenists, a novel published in 1919 by modernist writer Hope Mirrlees. The novel is set in and around the literary circles of the 17th Century Précieuses. The protagonist, a young woman named Madeleine Troqueville, becomes enamored of Mademoiselle de Scudéry, who snubs young Madeleine. It has been suggested that the novel is a roman à clef with Natalie Clifford Barney portrayed as Mademoiselle de Scudéry.

== Literature ==
- Oliver Mallick, "Le héros de toutes les saisons": Herrscherlob und politische Reflexionen in Madeleine de Scudérys Roman "La Promenade de Versailles" (1669), in: Zeitschrift für historische Forschung, vol. 41, no. 4 (2014), p. 619–686.
- Sainte-Beuve, Causeries du lundi, volume IV (Paris, 1857–62)
- Rathery and Boutron, Mademoiselle de Scudéry: Sa vie et sa correspondance (Paris, 1873)
- Victor Cousin, La société française au XVII^{e} siècle (sixth edition, two volumes, Paris, 1886)
- André Le Breton, Le roman au XVII^{e} siècle (Paris, 1890)
- AG Mason, The Women of the French Salons (New York, 1891)
- Georges Mongrédien, Madeleine de Scudéry et son salon: d'après des documents inédits, 1946
- Dorothy McDougall, Madeleine de Scudéry: her romantic life and death, 1972
- Alain Niderst, Madeleine de Scudéry, Paul Pellisson et leur monde, 1976

Summaries of the stories and keys to the characters may be found in Heinrich Körting, Geschichte des französischen Romans im 17ten Jahrhundert (second edition, Oppeln, 1891).
