= Honorat de Bueil, seigneur de Racan =

French aristocrat, soldier, poet and dramatist

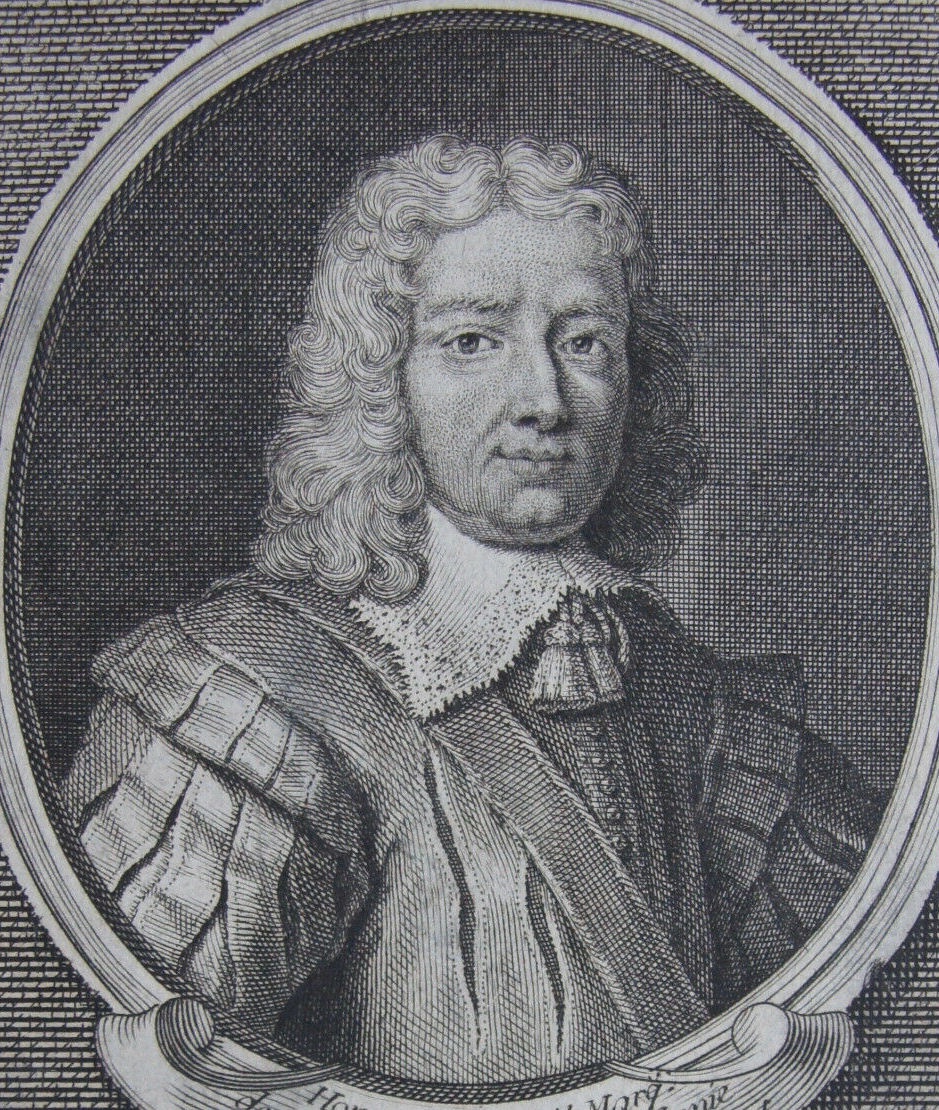
Honorat de Bueil, seigneur de Racan

Honorat de Bueil, seigneur de Racan (sometimes mistakenly listed as "marquis de Racan", although he never held this title) (5 February 1589 – 21 January 1670) was a French aristocrat, soldier, poet, dramatist and a founding member of the Académie française.

== Biography ==
Racan was born at Aubigné-Racan, Maine (province) into a noble family (originally of Italian origin) from the region of Tours (site of the Racan fief and the château of La Roche-Racan), Maine and Anjou.

An orphan at the age of 13 (both his uncle and father were killed in the wars), Racan came under the protection of the Count de Bellegarde (first gentleman of the king's chamber) and became a page for king Henry IV of France. His education was minimal, and by his own account he learned only the rudiments of Latin, and was bored by most of his subjects, exception being made to French verse. Racan's successes as a courtier were limited by his physical appearance and his stuttering (he reputedly had difficulties with both the letters r and c). In 1605, he met the esteemed poet François de Malherbe at the court, and the elder poet would become for Racan both a father figure and teacher. In 1621 Racan participated in the Wars of Religion and his military career would continue through the next decades (including the siege of Sancerre and the siege of La Rochelle).

Around 1619, Racan's pastoral play in verse Les Bergeries (originally entitled Arthénice) - inspired by Virgil, Tasso's Aminta, Giambattista Guarini's Il pastor fido, Honoré d'Urfé's L'Astrée, and, to a certain extent, the writings of Saint François de Sales - was performed to great acclaim. Racan had equal success with his Stances de la retraite (1618), his translations of the Psalms - in an initial version in 1631, and later with his Odes sacrées (tirées des psaumes de David) (1651) and Dernières œuvres et poésies chrétiennes (1660) - and his memoirs on the life of Malherbe (1651). Not knowing Hebrew, Racan relied on accurate French paraphrases of the sacred texts (such as those by Clément Marot), but departed from the literal translations in the interest of poetic grace. Racan's acceptance speech for the Académie française Contre les Sciences (1635), was an oration against "rules" and affectation, and in praise of "naturalness" (prefiguring Jean-Jacques Rousseau by over a hundred years).

Racan's poetry was rigorous (he reworked his poems throughout his life and his works were often published with last minute errata), but he did not completely reject the authors of Renaissance (unlike Malherbe, Racan appreciated Pierre de Ronsard and Michel de Montaigne) and was less inflexible on the question of the three unities. His elegies and pastoral show a sensitivity to the natural sights of his native region, and his poetry is often informed by a melancholy inspired by his youthful disappointments in love and the financial and personal tragedies of his life.

He died in Paris in 1670.

== See also ==
- Guirlande de Julie
