= Georges de Scudéry =

French novelist, dramatist and poet (1601–1667)

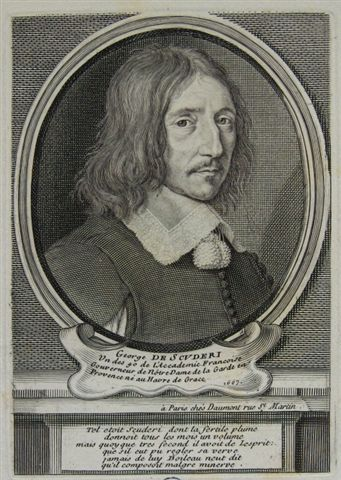
Georges de Scudéry.

Georges de Scudéry (French pronunciation: [ʒɔʁʒ də skydeʁi]; 22 August 1601 – 14 May 1667), the elder brother of Madeleine de Scudéry, was a French novelist, dramatist and poet.

== Life ==
Georges de Scudéry was born in Le Havre, in Normandy, whither his father had moved from Provence. He served in the army for some time, and, though in the vein of gasconading which was almost peculiar to him he no doubt exaggerated his services, there seems little doubt that he was a stout soldier.

He conceived a fancy for literature before he was thirty, and during the whole of the middle of the century he was one of the most characteristic figures of Paris. He gained the favour of Richelieu by his opposition to Corneille. He wrote a letter to the Académie française criticizing Le Cid, and his play, L'Amour tyrannique (1640), was patronized by the cardinal in opposition to Corneille.

Possibly these circumstances had something to do with his appointment as governor of the fortress of Notre-Dame de la Garde, near Marseille in 1643, and in 1650 he was elected to the Académie. During the troubles of the Fronde he was exiled to Normandy, where he made his fortune by a rich marriage. He was an industrious dramatist, but L'Amour tyrannique is practically the only piece among his numerous tragi-comedies and pastorals that has escaped oblivion. His other most famous work was the epic of Alaric (1659). He lent his name to his sister's first romances, but did little beyond correcting the proofs.

Scudéry's swashbuckler affectations were rather exaggerated by literary gossip and tradition. Although possibly not quite sane, he had some poetical power, a fervent love of literature, a high sense of honour and of friendship.

Scudéry also wrote CURIA POLITIAE, OR, THE APOLOGIES OF SEVERALL PRINCES: Justifying to the WORLD Their Most Eminent Actions", which had been translated into English and printed by Humphrey Moseley "at the sign of the Prince's-Arms, in St. Paul's Church-Yard", in 1654.

Georges de Scudéry was sketched by Théophile Gautier in his Grotesques.

== See also ==
- Guirlande de Julie
