= François de Malherbe =

French poet, critic, and translator (1555–1628)

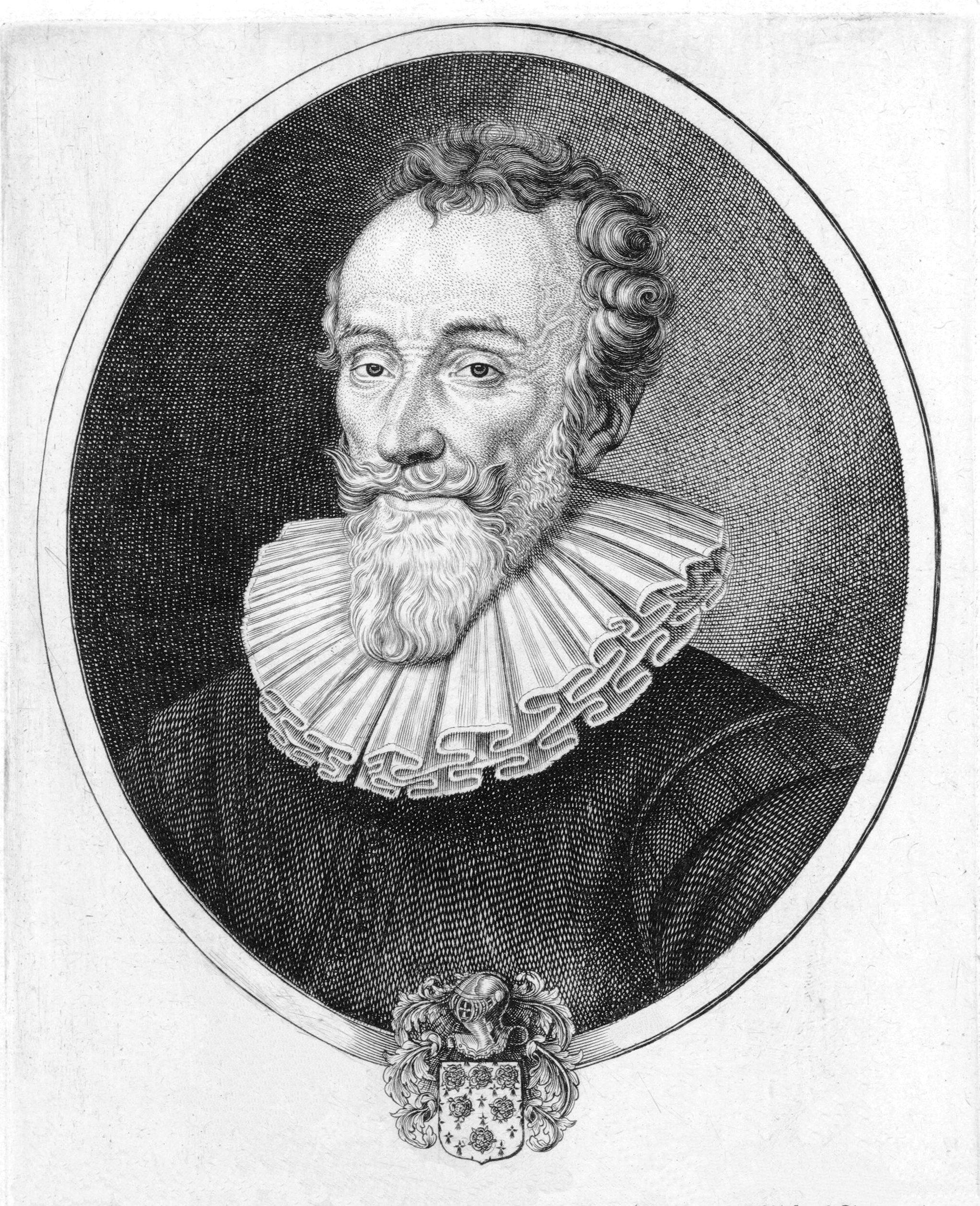

François de Malherbe (French pronunciation: [fʁɑ̃swa də malɛʁb], 1555 – 16 October 1628) was a French poet, critic, and translator.

== Life ==
He was born in Le Locheur (near Caen, Normandie), to a family of standing, although the family's pedigree did not satisfy the heralds in terms of its claims to nobility pre-16th century. Francois the poet was the eldest son of another François de Malherbe, conseiller du roi in the magistracy of Caen. He himself was elaborately educated at Caen, at Paris, at Heidelberg and at Basel. At the age of twenty-one, preferring arms to the gown, he entered the household of Henri d'Angoulême, the illegitimate son of Henry II, governor of Provence. He served this prince as secretary in Provence, and married there in 1581. It seems that he wrote verses at this period, but, to judge from a quotation of Tallemant des Réaux, they must have been very bad ones. His patron died when Malherbe was on a visit in his native province, and for a time he had no particular employment, though by some servile verses he obtained a considerable gift of money from Henry III, whom he afterwards libelled. He lived partly in Provence and partly in Normandy for many years after this event; but very little is known of his life during this period. His Larmes de Saint Pierre, imitated from Luigi Tansillo, appeared in 1587.

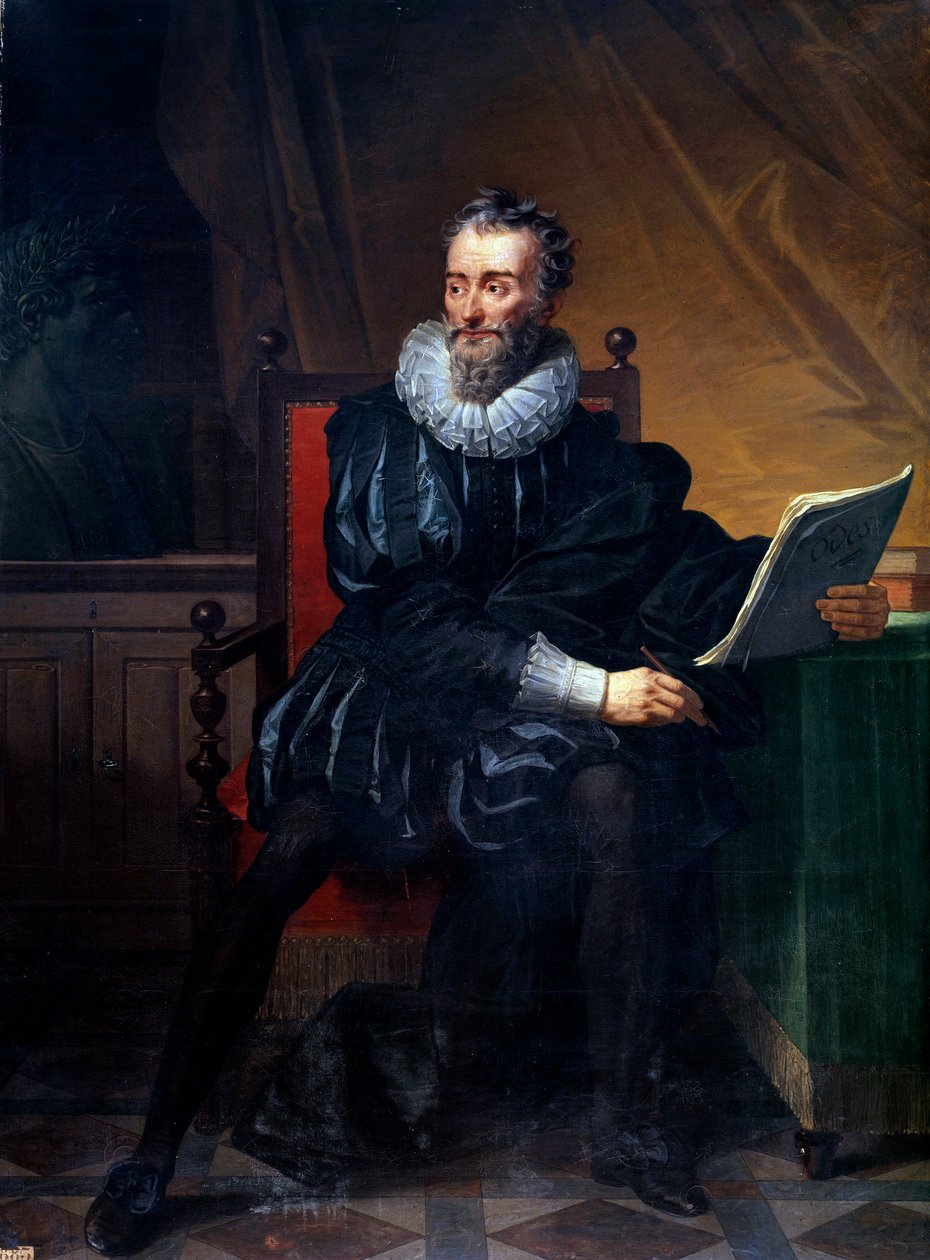
Robert Lefevre

It was in 1600 that he presented to Maria de' Medici an ode of welcome, the first of his remarkable poems. But four or five years more passed before his fortune, which had hitherto been indifferent, turned. He was presented by his countryman, the Cardinal Du Perron, to Henry IV; and, though that economical prince did not at first show any great eagerness to entertain the poet, he was at last summoned to court and endowed after one fashion or another. It is said that the pension promised him was not paid till the next reign. His father died in 1606, and he came into his inheritance.

From this time forward he lived at court, corresponding affectionately with his wife, but seeing her only twice in some twenty years. His old age was saddened by a great misfortune. His son, Marc Antoine, a young man of promise, died in a duel against Paul de Fortia de Piles. Malherbe suspected foul play and used his utmost influence to have the de Fortia and Jean Baptiste de Covet (de Fortia's second in the duel) brought to justice. Malherbe died before the suit was decided; it is said in consequence of disease caught at the siege of La Rochelle, where he had gone to petition the king. Malherbe died in Paris, on 16 October 1628, at the age of seventy-three, only 15 months after his son.

The football team from Caen, France, Stade Malherbe de Caen, is named after him.

== Works ==
Malherbe exercised, or at least indicated the exercise of, a great and enduring effect upon French literature, though not exactly a wholly beneficial one. From the time of Malherbe dates the gradual development of the poetic rules of "Classicism" that would dominate for nearly two centuries until the Romantics. The critical and restraining tendency of Malherbe who preached greater technical perfection, and especially greater simplicity and purity in vocabulary and versification, was a sober correction to the luxuriant importation and innovation of Pierre de Ronsard and La Pléiade, but the lines of praise by Nicolas Boileau-Despréaux beginning Enfin Malherbe vint ("Finally Malherbe arrived") are rendered only partially applicable by Boileau's ignorance of older French poetry.

The personal character of Malherbe, whose writings demonstrate a bludgeon-like wit, was far from amiable; the good as well as bad side of Malherbe's theory and practice is excellently described by his contemporary and rival Mathurin Régnier, who was animated against Malherbe, not merely by reason of his own devotion to Ronsard but because of Malherbe's discourtesy towards Régnier's uncle Philippe Desportes, whom the Norman poet had at first distinctly plagiarised.

Malherbe's reforms helped to elaborate the kind of verse necessary for the classical tragedy, but his own poetical work is scanty in amount, and for the most part frigid and lacking inspiration. The beautiful Consolation a Duperier, in which occurs the famous line – Et, rose, elle a vécu ce que vivent les roses – the odes to Marie de' Medici and to Louis XIII, are the best-remembered of his works.

His prose work is abundant. It consists of some translations of Livy and Seneca, and of a very large number of letters, many of which are addressed to Peiresc. It also contains a commentary on Desportes, in which Malherbe's style of verbal criticism is displayed.

Malherbe's two most important disciples were François Maynard and Racan; Claude Favre de Vaugelas is credited with having purified French diction at about the same time.

Two of his poems were set to music by Maurice Jaubert.

== In popular culture ==
The Caen-based association football club Stade Malherbe Caen, founded in 1913, takes its name from the poet.

== Bibliography ==
The chief authorities for the biography of Malherbe are the Vie de Malherbe by his friend and pupil Racan, and the long Historiette which Tallemant des Réaux has devoted to him. The standard edition is Oeuvres poétiques, edited by René Fromilhague and Raymond Lebègue, 1968 (in French). Antoine Adam's popular collection of Malherbe's Poésies, is based on his Pléiade edition, (1982)(in French). Secondary sources: La Doctrine de Malherbe, by G Brunot (1891), is a classic (in French). René Fromilhague, Malherbe: Technique et création poétique (1954)(in French). Close readings of major poems appear in David Lee Rubin, High Hidden Order: Design and Meaning in the Odes of Malherbe (1972), revisited in the appendix to the same author's The Knot of Artifice: A Poetic of the French Lyric in the Early 17th Century (1981); also see Chapter 1. Claude K. Abraham's Enfin Malherbe (1971) which focuses on the influence of Malherbe's prosody.
