= De Vigne =

de Vigne (in some cases De Vigne) is a surname. De la Vigne is a closely related name. Notable people with the names include:

== De Vigne ==
- Félix De Vigne (1806–1862), Belgian painter
- Julius De Vigne (1844–1906), Belgian lawyer, politician and writer
- Paul de Vigne (1843–1901), Belgian sculptor

== De la Vigne ==
- Anne de La Vigne (1634–1684), French poet and philosopher
- Jean Cavenac de la Vigne, 16th century French diplomat
- Michel de La Vigne (1588–1648), French physician
- Rudolf de la Vigne (1920–2004), German footballer

See also the surname Vigne.
