= Charles de Sainte-Maure, duc de Montausier =

French soldier and governor

Duke of Montausier
- Duke of Montausier
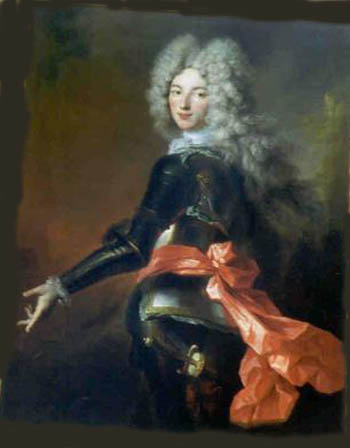
- Portrait by Nicolas de Largillière, fourth quarter of the 17th century
- Tenure: 1664–1690
- Born: 6 October 1610
- Died: 17 November 1690 (aged 80)
- Offices: Governor of Saintonge and Angoumois; Governor of the Grand Dauphin
- Noble family: House of Sainte-Maure
- Spouse: Julie d'Angennes
- Father: Léon de Sainte-Maure
- Mother: Marguerite de Châteaubriand

Charles de Sainte-Maure, duc de Montausier (6 October 1610 – 17 November 1690), was a French soldier and, from 1668 to 1680, the governor of the Dauphin, the eldest son and heir of Louis XIV, King of France.

== Biography ==
Charles was born on 6 October 1610, the second son of Léon de Sainte-Maure, Baron of Montausier. His parents were Huguenots, and he was educated at the Protestant Academy of Sedan under Pierre Du Moulin. He served brilliantly at the siege of Casale in 1629. Becoming baron de Montausier at the death of his elder brother in 1635, he was the recognised aspirant for the hand of Julie d'Angennes, the eldest daughter of the marquis and marquise de Rambouillet. Having served under Bernard of Saxe-Weimar in Germany in 1634, he returned to the French service in 1636, and fought in the Rhenish campaigns of the following years. He was taken prisoner on 25 November 1643 after the defeat of the French forces under the command of Josias von Rantzau in the Battle of Tuttlingen. He remained for ten months in captivity until payment of his ransom was made.

On his return to France, he became a lieutenant-general. On 15 July 1645, he married Julie d'Angennes, "the incomparable Julie", thus terminating a 14-year courtship famous in the annals of French literature because of the Guirlande de Julie, a garland of 61 madrigals by 19 poets, among them Montausier, Claude de Malleville, Georges de Scudéry, possibly Pierre Corneille (if Octave Uzanne is correct in the attribution of three of the six poems signed M.C.), Philippe Habert, Simon Arnauld de Pomponne, Jean Desmarets de Saint Sorlin, Antoine Gombaud (Le nain de la Princesse Julie) and others. It was copied by the famous calligraphist Nicolas Jarry in a magnificent manuscript, on each page of which was a flower painted by Nicolas Robert, and was presented to Julie on her fête day in 1641.

Montausier was named governor of Saintonge and Angoumois after the death of his uncle, the comte de Brassac, and became a Roman Catholic before his marriage. During the Fronde, he remained faithful to the Crown in spite of personal grievances against Mazarin. On the conclusion of peace in 1653, the marquis, who had been severely wounded in 1652, obtained high favour at court in spite of the roughness of his manners and the general austerity which made the Parisian public recognize him as the original of Alceste in Molière's Le Misanthrope.

Montausier received from Louis XIV the Order of the Saint Esprit and the government of Normandy. In 1664, the marquisate of Montausier was erected into a duché-pairie). In 1668, Montausier became the governor of the dauphin, a post he kept until 1680. He initiated the series of classics ad usum Delphini, directed by the learned Huet, and gave the closest attention to the education of his charge, who was moved by his iron discipline only to a hatred of learning. Montausier died on 17 November 1690.

Court gossip assigned part of Montausier's favour to the complaisance of his wife, who had been named gouvernante des enfants de France in 1661, at the time of the dauphin's birth, until 1664, when she was appointed lady-in-waiting to the queen, a position she used to facilitate Louis XIV's passion for Louise de la Vallière, and subsequently to protect Madame de Montespan, who found refuge from her husband with her.
