= Zaga Christ =

Ethiopian politician and traveler (c.1610–1638)

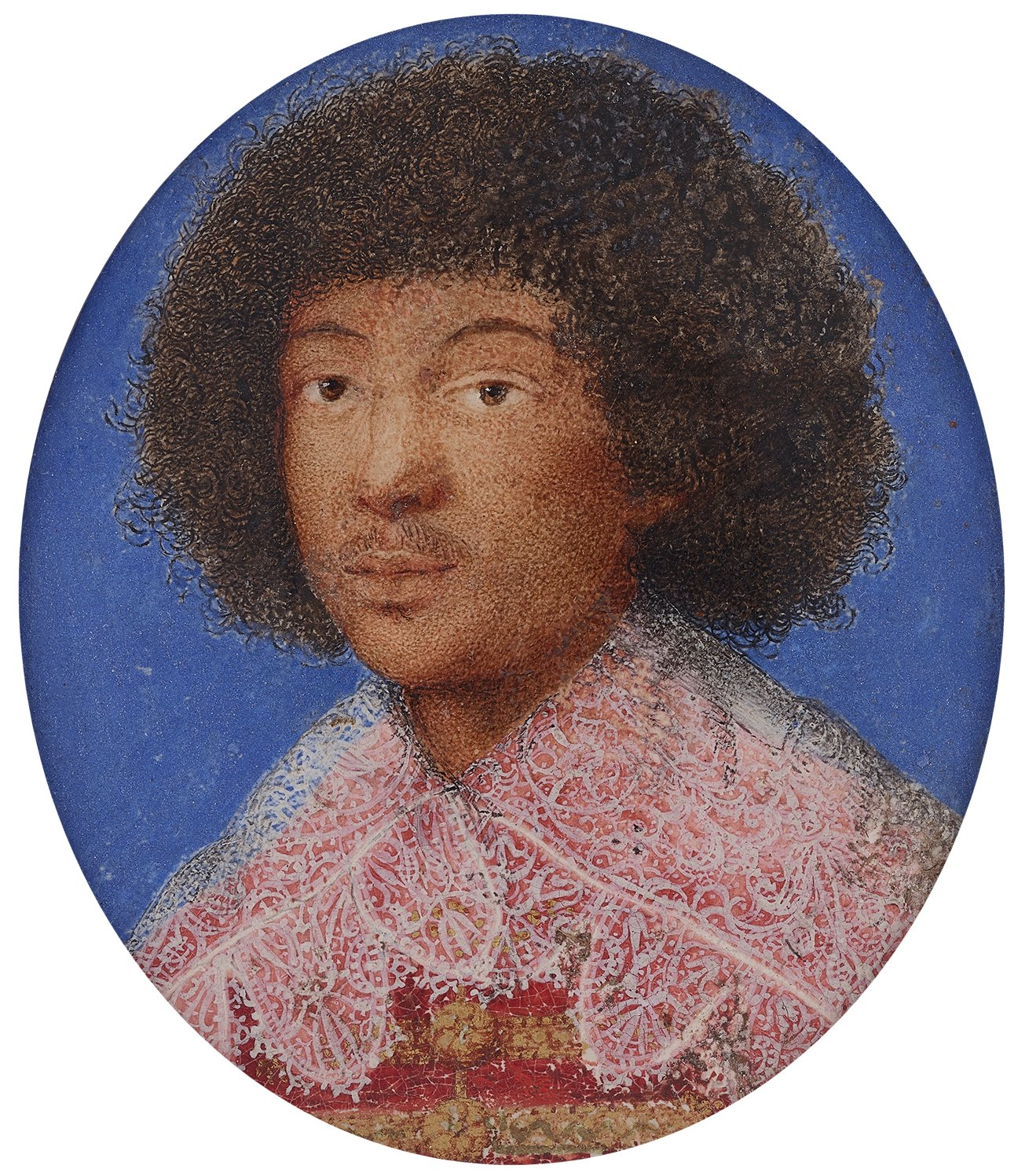
Portrait of Zaga Christ by Giovanna Garzoni. Turin, 1635

Zaga Christ (c. 1616 – April 22, 1638), also referred to as Ṣägga Krəstos, Atənatewos, and Lessana Krəstos, was an Ethiopian imposter who falsely claimed he was a Prince of Ethiopia. He traveled extensively, living in Sudan, Egypt, Palestine, Greece, Italy, and France. As part of a vetting process to prove his identity he produced an autobiography detailing his dynastic claim and his travels. This is the earliest known autobiography written and published in Europe by an African-born author. Zaga Christ eventually converted to Catholicism, and while residing in Turin, he was immortalized by the accomplished artist Giovanna Garzoni (1600–1670) in what is considered the earliest known European portrait miniature of an African. Zaga Christ died of pleurisy in 1638 while living in France under the patronage of Cardinal Richelieu.

== Accounts of his story ==
There are many accounts of his life story. The French Franciscan friar Eugène Roger met Zaga Christ in Nazareth (then part of Ottoman Empire) and was familiar with his whereabouts from there until his death. Rèchac's accounts came from an Italian manuscript, written by Zaga Christ himself when he was living in Rome. The Catholic Patriarch of Ethiopia, Afonso Mendes, devoted a letter in 1638 to disputing his claims of royal birth.

== Early Age ==
In March 1632, Zaga Christ arrived at the Venetian consulate in Cairo, claiming to be the son of Emperor Yaʿǝqob I of Ethiopia, who had been killed during the political and religious conflicts of the early 17th century. According to his account, he had fled from Ethiopia through the Nile Valley (Funj Sultanate) after Emperor Susǝnyos I, the ruling Catholic monarch, had allegedly killed his father. Zaga Christ's story intrigued the consulate's chaplain, Father Paolo da Lodi, who had served as the prefect of the Franciscan mission in Egypt. Recognizing the potential value of Zaga Christ as a symbol of Catholic interests in Ethiopia, Paolo informed his superiors at the Congregation of Propaganda Fide in Rome.

Shortly after meeting him, Father Paolo sent a message to Rome mentioning "a certain Abyssinian who claimed to be the son of the king of Abes [Ethiopia], though he misled many, including myself, as I could not communicate with him in his language." However, Father Paolo’s endorsement was initially undermined when three Ethiopian pilgrims informed Capuchin Gilles de Loches that he was a "liar" and a "rogue." Persuaded by these accusations, Father Paolo retracted his earlier support, warning Rome and Jerusalem to disregard his previous letters. Nevertheless, his opinions began to shift again as he spent more time with the young Ethiopian upon taking up his new post in Jerusalem.

Father Paolo eventually became convinced of his authenticity, reporting that the Ethiopian had impressed friars in Jerusalem and Nazareth with his humility, piety, and "royal soul." This change of heart came after his formal conversion to Roman Catholicism on St. Peter's Day, a significant moment that reinforced his claims of noble lineage and religious devotion. Conversion was a critical tool for it helped to align himself with Roman authority and presented him as a potential Catholic ally in Ethiopia. Father Paolo arranged for Zaga Christ's passage to Rome, providing a glowing endorsement of him as the son of the Ethiopian emperor, filled with zeal for the Catholic faith. This letter remained the most fervent endorsement Zaga would receive during his European journey. In Jerusalem, Ṣägga Krәstos was hosted at the Ethiopian monastery of Dayr as-Sulṭān, located on the roof of the Church of the Holy Sepulchre.

== In Europe ==
After spending time in Jerusalem and Nazareth, Zaga departed from Haifa in September 1632. His journey took him through various Venetian-controlled territories before arriving in Otranto, Italy. During his travels through the Kingdom of Naples, he was treated with considerable respect, receiving gifts and honors from local nobles and viceroys, including valuable horses and financial support. However, despite such high regard, suspicions about his true identity persisted. The papal nuncio in Naples notified Rome that Zaga Christ lacked sufficient credentials, a challenge that would continue to follow him throughout his stay in the Eternal City.

Upon reaching Rome in early 1633, Zaga Christ faced increasing scrutiny. His reception as a prince was contested by certain factions, including Jesuits and Portuguese who were wary of Franciscan influence and fearful that he was a fraud attempting to exploit the Church. These factions alleged that the Franciscans were misled and that the presence of Zaga Christ was damaging to the Church. The situation became tense, with the Portuguese Jesuits likely involved in the Vicar of Rome’s decision to confine Zaga Christ to the Franciscan convent and pressure him to leave the city. The same royal family who would attempt multiple conquests of Ethiopia (See: Italo-Ethiopian War would bankroll and back Sagga's claim.

His presence in Rome occurred amidst broader tensions between religious orders, the papacy, and the Portuguese crown. The Congregation of Propaganda Fide, which oversaw global Catholic missions, was engaged in a power struggle with the Portuguese over control of ecclesiastical privileges in overseas territories. The Jesuits, who had been instrumental in the missionary efforts in Ethiopia, were particularly concerned about the Congregation’s centralizing ambitions and Zaga Christ arrival in Rome. His backers, such as the Franciscans, saw his potential as a symbol of an alternative Ethiopian mission.

Despite this conflict, Zaga Christ managed to gain the protection of Francesco Ingoli, the secretary of Propaganda Fide, who reported that the Ethiopian prince had "the appearance and manners of a royal." Although Ingoli was inclined to support Zaga Christ, he required solid proof of his identity. Ingoli, a scholar and scientist, began a thorough investigation, gathering testimonies and cross-referencing Zaga Christ claims with known Ethiopian history. However, the task was complicated by the limited available information about Ethiopia’s dynastic politics.

A key piece of evidence during this investigation was a lengthy autobiographical statement written by Zaga Christ, titled Narratione del viaggio fatto dall’Altezza Seren(issima), del sig. Zagra Cristos figliolo dell’Imperator d’Ethiopia. This document, which was later printed and circulated in Europe, presented his version of his lineage and life events, including a detailed recounting of Ethiopia’s dynastic struggles. However, although the account displayed an impressive understanding of Ethiopian history, it also contained significant chronological errors. Zaga Christ extended Emperor Yaqob reign by two decades, a necessary revision to support his claim as the emperor’s son. Historical records showed that Yaqob reigned only briefly from 1597 to 1607, a discrepancy that cast doubt on Zaga Christ assertions.

Zaga Christ certainly shared his statement with the Italian historian Maiolino Bisaccioni, who met him in Venice in the first half of 1634. Bisaccioni later included the first printed version of the Narratione in his 1634 study of the Thirty Years' War. Like other observers, Bisaccioni was impressed by the young man's bearing and character, describing his meeting with him as follows:

"This past 1st of December [1634] a young Ethiopian arrived in Venice, famed to be of the imperial lineage of that vast and big kingdom that controls multiple kingdoms. It is not my purpose to describe such remote things, already narrated by many others. I will only say what attracted my curiosity. I saw and learned from him happenings worthy of being recorded. I saw the youth, nineteen or twenty years old, of a colour between black and olivaster, of very beautiful appearance, with sparse facial hair, with very black and curly hair, and of medium height; I found him to be of good wit, well versed in the holy scriptures, very devout, affable, majestic, and melancholic because of his accidents, he made stunted sighs. He politely told me of his affairs: there is no bigger fall for a great prince than to go as a pilgrim, poor, wander and flee between accidents and disasters. Hence, I decided to honour my papers and, in the most succinct way possible, describe them [his affairs] here’"

Despite these qualities, doubts persisted. Ingoli continued to gather evidence, including testimonies from individuals who had encountered Zaga Christ during his journey. However, none of the testimonies were conclusive enough to fully verify his claims. Affidavits from interpreters and merchants in Cairo offered little more than hearsay, and even the supporting statements from prominent Maronites failed to provide definitive proof of his imperial lineage. Although Ingoli remained skeptical, he allowed him to remain under the care of his Franciscan supporters.

Despite his efforts, Ingoli had limited evidence regarding his claims, primarily relying on the latter’s narratives. He reorganized the original Narratione into a chronological table titled Brevissima narratio del imperatore Jacob disposta per ordine d’anni, outlining calendar years, claimed ages, and key events. While this suggests he was likely an impostor, Ingoli overlooked this due to his unfamiliarity with Ethiopia’s dynastic history.

In his reports, Ingoli questioned how the Church should handle the situation, given the lack of certainty about his identity. He hesitated to endorse him officially but believed support was essential for the future of Catholicism in Ethiopia. Ingoli recognized that Ṣägga Krǝstos could be either an asset or a liability, depending on his true identity and how he was treated.

Ingoli considered various European powers for potential support. He dismissed Spanish-Portuguese backing due to existing tensions and avoided the Venetians because of concerns over their relations with the Ottomans. The French seemed viable, but he worried it could provoke conflict in Ethiopia. Ultimately, he suggested the Duchy of Tuscany because of its ties to the Druze Emir Fakhr al-Din, who had received European support for his own ambitions.

Ingoli demonstrated a keen understanding of European geopolitical dynamics and showed consideration for Ṣägga Krǝstos's situation. However, he overlooked a critical element: Ṣägga Krǝstos’s own ambitions. Between his time in Cairo and his arrival in Rome, the young Ethiopian recognized he could leverage the competition among European powers. In Rome, he portrayed himself as royalty, socializing actively and forming connections with influential figures, often disregarding Ingoli’s cautions. Ingoli grew increasingly anxious about this dynamic, remarking:

"This young man [Ṣägga Krǝstos] full of confidence … told me that the female French ambassador wanted to meet him … and after much reasoning with her he told her his situation and the lady invited him with various promises to pass through France. This gentleman … was negotiating with the Venetian ambassador so that the Republic could take him to Ethiopia … but the Venetian ambassador did not approve … he [Ṣägga Krǝstos] was not recognized as the man he was presenting himself to be; he turned his soul to avail himself to the French, unwilling to pass through the hands of the Spanish."

Ṣägga Krǝstos operated as a free agent, navigating the complexities of the political landscape to his advantage. His timing was fortuitous; he arrived in Rome amid rising concerns for Ethiopia’s future. While transiting the Mediterranean, news broke that Susenyos had died and had been succeeded by Fasiladas, who immediately launched efforts to eliminate Catholicism from his realm. Although the details of the succession wouldn’t reach Rome until mid-1634, Ṣägga Krǝstos exploited this uncertainty, warning Ingoli of impending persecution against Catholics by Fasilädäs’s traditionalist faction. He suggested he could return to Ethiopia via the Red Sea, where he had allies who would support his claims. Ingoli was impressed by Ṣägga Krǝstos’s insight, stating, “from these grand thoughts your excellency [Antonio Barberini] can deduce that this youth was not a lowborn, hence it is opportune to reflect on his disposition.” Despite his admiration, Ingoli became wary of Ṣägga Krǝstos’s growing influence and recommended relocating him to a Franciscan residence outside Rome, reasoning that if he was an impostor, his absence wouldn’t matter, but if he was genuine, he could be nurtured to support the Catholic faith. However, Ingoli underestimated Ṣägga Krǝstos's determination and savvy in self-presentation. Choosing to remain in Rome, Ṣägga Krǝstos continued negotiating with various powers, ultimately expressing a desire not to align with any European prince except the Dutch. Unbeknownst to Ingoli, he had no intention of returning to Ethiopia; rather, he was using his position to negotiate favorable terms for himself. Unable to curb Ṣägga Krǝstos’s ambitions, Ingoli decided to assign him a Franciscan escort for oversight.

After a year in Rome, Ṣägga Krǝstos left with four Franciscans—Ignazio da Perugia, Paolo da Roma, Simone da Sezze, and Antonio da Virgoletta—who were meant to accompany him to Ethiopia. By December 1634, in Venice, the missionaries grew frustrated with delays in their journey and their uncertainty about Ṣägga Krǝstos’s negotiations. Father Antonio petitioned the Venetian Senate to travel to Ethiopia on English or Dutch ships, but the leaders were unwilling to provoke the Ottomans over a pretender lacking credentials. Despite warnings about the Caucasus conflicts, Ṣägga Krǝstos pursued English-Dutch options again, alarming the friars about trusting "heretics." Ingoli believed he could not be swayed by Protestant beliefs and could succeed the aging Emperor Susǝnyos. However, by late June, Ṣägga Krǝstos decided to travel to Marseille and then Paris, frustrating the friars further.

After more than six months in Venice, the party arrived in Mantua in late June. A local chronicle noted that "the son of the Ethiopian Emperor, a prince about 22 years of age, tall with large and dark eyes, of saturnine temperament and few words, was treated magnificently by Duke Carlo I Gonzaga," who had him served as if he were his own son. Father Simone reported that the Duke went to visit him frequently, providing him with generous support and gifts, including 200 scudi, and ensuring his well-being during a period of illness treating him with great generosity. By mid-July, the party reached Piacenza, where Ṣägga Krǝstos fell ill again. After six weeks in the city, the party departed, for Genoa to embark on a Dutch or English ship, but by late August the four were in Turin instead. In Turin, papal nuncio Alessandro Castracani cautioned him against the English route and promoted Iberian support, but Ṣägga Krǝstos remained unconvinced, insisting on promises of protection from the King of Spain and Portugal. Frustrated with his delays, the friars grew impatient and began to question his faith and legitimacy. In response, Ṣägga Krǝstos underwent confirmation, with Duke Vittorio Amedeo I acting as his godfather. "On the evening of Sunday, April 1, 1635, in “the Cathedral, His Highness [Vittorio Amedeo I di Savoia, 1630–1637] acted as godfather to the great Prince of Ethiopia.” (Little did he know that three centuries later, two among the Duke’s descendants would become, briefly, Emperor and Viceroy of Ethiopia). Despite this, the friars sought to withdraw from the mission. Father Simone returned to Rome, while Fathers Antonio and Ignazio planned an independent mission. Ultimately, he traveled to Paris alone, generously supported by his Savoyard godfather. During this period in northern Italy, he sat for a portrait by the artist Giovanna Garzoni. Against a soft violet blue background, he is dressed in red and gold court attire with a broad lace collar signifiers of his royal identity. This elegant European outfit aligned with his claim of royal status. On the reverse, she signed her name in Latin and attempted to write it in Amharic, likely with his help a small but telling gesture that suggests a close rapport between painter and sitter.

By mid-June, Ṣägga Krǝstos was in Paris with two Franciscans, Antonio and Ignazio, who rejoined him. As before, he mingled with the elites, while the friars grew increasingly frustrated with his reluctance to return to Ethiopia. Father Ignazio remarked that, after two years, they understood he had no intention of returning. Father Antonio confirmed that Ṣägga Krǝstos wanted to stay in Paris and eventually return to Ethiopia only to fight his enemies. Among those charmed by Ṣägga Krǝstos was Tommaso Campanella, a theologian who supported his cause. He told Ingoli that he was intelligent, knew almost the entire Bible by heart, and that any accusations of heresy against him were groundless. He suggested that Ṣägga Krǝstos should remain in Paris until it was safer to explore Ethiopia. Campanella’s view contrasted with others who noted Ṣägga Krǝstos’s financial struggles. In a dramatic appeal to Cardinal Richelieu, Ṣägga Krǝstos explained his dire situation and was rewarded with an 800-scudi annual pension from King Louis XIII. This considerable sum indicated that Ṣägga Krǝstos was thriving. In a letter to Cardinal Richelieu, he illustrated his situation:

"You know I am waiting for your rescue; perhaps you have not been advised that I have been reduced to a hermit, and that my host decided to dismiss me for lack of payment. Were I in a condition to be able to work to sustain myself, instead of hoping in the courtesy I need from the King and your excellency, I would force myself to do so."

Meanwhile, in Rome, news reached Ingoli of Susenyos death and the Jesuits' expulsion from Ethiopia. He suggested sending Ṣägga Krǝstos to Ethiopia with French support. However, in 1636, Father Antonio parted ways with Ṣägga Krǝstos for good, leaving for a mission in Kongo. Ṣägga Krǝstos continued to enjoy Parisian life under royal patronage. In early November 1637, he was arrested on the outskirts of Paris, accused of attempting to poison a Parisian notable, François Saulnier, in order to marry his wife, Magdalene Alamant, with whom he was supposedly having an affair. He had exchanged marriage vows with her and tried to elope. The scandal deepened with the discovery, among his belongings, of letters written by Sister Caterina Angelica Massima, a nun from a noble Roman family. The letters do not appear to have survived, but in his vows to Magdalene, Ṣägga Krǝstos had sworn to “abandon and renounce any love, passion and affection that I had in the past and I could presently still have, for Madame Catharina Angelica Massima, resident in Rome in the Convent of Saint Cosme.” Apart from socializing with powerful people, Ṣägga Krǝstos seemed to have developed a close personal relationship with a nun during his stay in Italy. Accused of adultery and potentially attempted murder, he was imprisoned in the Grand Châtelet of Paris. His behavior during the interrogation was defiant, as he refused to acknowledge the authority of his captors. boldly proclaiming that his royal status exempted him from imprisonment. He declared that he "was not born to obey, but rather to command." These words would be his last. On April 22 “at 10 in the evening in Ruel, the Prince of Ethiopia called Zaga Christos died of pleurisy at age 22. He had sojourned in France for three years and he was always assisted by the people of His Eminence [Richelieu].” It is not mentioned the details of how he ended up at Cardinal Richelieu’s home in Ruel. It's likely that Richelieu stepped in to avoid a scandal, out of concern for his health, or for political reasons. In any case, his six-year journey, had come to an end.

== Death & Legacy ==
His fortunes took a racially charged turn after his death, as his life story was reframed to fit negative stereotypes of African men, particularly in relation to sexuality. His controversial relationship and capture were later twisted into a caricature of uncontrolled "African lust" entertaining French audiences for centuries. He was described in degrading terms, such as a “wonderful negro” who should be crowned by Venus, the Roman goddess of love, and whose body was likened to a "spermatic vessel." This portrayal tapped into racially charged depictions of African men as hypersexual and morally unrestrained. These representations of him, also found their way into French literature. In the aftermath of Ṣägga Krәstos’s scandalous arrest, his claim of royalty became secondary to his emerging identity as an exotic womanizer. His death was, in some circles, lamented as a particular loss for women, and his appearances in period gossip and literature often included mentions of his physical attributes. Guy Patin, in his memoirs remarked: "He pretends to be a prince rather well; he is brazen. When beautiful ladies come to visit him, he flatters and gets quite personal with them. He is abundantly endowed by nature; it is said that this is how he won the favor of Madame Saulnier."

He became a symbolic “Ethiopian Prince” in plays like Les Visionnaires (1639) by Jean Desmarets. Likewise, in 1662, a plagiarized version of Molière’s Sganarelle, printed under the title La Cocue imaginaire (The Imaginary Cuckold), referenced the allure women were said to feel toward the so-called “King of Ethiopia” His image as an impostor was further popularized by Jean-Baptiste de Rocoles, who revised Krǝstos's life story in Les Imposteurs Insignes (Famous Impostors). This text contributed to the broader literary figure of the impostor, shaping how deceitful figures were represented in literature during that time. While many poets covered his death with obscene words, one French poem emerged, written by Malleville, of which five manuscript copies exist: The Death of the King of Ethiopia.

"Of a King who, without a steed, traversed all lands And frequented the courts of a thousand potentates At last, weary of wandering from province to province, This errant knight, this solitary Prince, Came to end his endless journeying In the blessed fields of fertile Rueil. It was there that death, with an ebony arrow, Pierced the heart of this great Captain."

Fascinated by Zaga Christ, the Swedish writer Björnstahl would obtain a copy of his death certificate —a fortunate event, as the parish registers of Rueil for the year 1638 are incomplete. The death record reveals that Richelieu provided him with very modest funeral rites given the price paid, but that his burial had the honor of taking place in the choir of the church itself:

“In the year 1638, in the month of April, on the 24th of said month, was buried in the Choir of the Church of said Rueil, on the Epistle side, Dom Zaga Christus, native of Meroe or rather Amara, self-proclaimed King of Ethiopia and son of Emperor Jacob, who died in this place on the 22nd of said month at eleven o’clock in the evening, from pleurisy. The burial of said pretended King, aged twenty-four, was conducted at the expense of His Eminence and cost 96 livres and 11 sols.”

Christ’s tombstone, now destroyed, read:

Here lies the king of Ethiopia

The original, or the copy:

Was he king? Was he not?

Death has finished the discussion.

He also brought several Ethiopian manuscripts with him, which later ended up in the collection of Chancellor Pierre Séguier. Séguier's collection became the largest repository of Ethiopian manuscripts in Europe at the time, containing between 33 and 41 items—surpassing even the collections of the Vatican Library and the Ethiopian monastery of Santo Stefano dei Mori in Rome. This collection was so significant that the renowned German scholar Hiob Ludolf traveled specifically to France to consult it. According to Hiob Ludolf in Historia Aethiopica, he was characterized by an appearance that played a crucial role in his impersonation:

"But that which added to the Credit of the Impostor was his graceful Presence, with a Countenance wherein Seriousness and Frankness were wonderfully intermix'd, that while he kept company with other Princes, (as Bochart himself told me) he seem'd to excel them all both for beauty of form, and sweetness of disposition; and particularly that his Majestic Aspect struck all his beholders with admiration. Whether that Beauty were really in his Person, or whether the Novelty of the thing, or the Opinion that he was of the Race of Salomon, byals'd their Judgments. Tho otherwife, no reason could be given why he acted the part of the Son of an Ethiopian King, unless it were to contend with Hercules or Messalina for the prize of most enormous Lust. And indeed it may be thought that fearing his imposture should be discovered, he rather chose to bring himself to his end by pleasing debauches of luxury, than to fall under the hangman.”

Although modern scholarship generally regards Ṣägga Krǝstos as a pretender, he successfully leveraged the religious and political dynamics of 17th-century Europe to gain considerable support. His arrival coincided with intense competition between Jesuit and Franciscan orders, the ambitions of the Congregation for the Propagation of the Faith (Propaganda Fide), and upheaval in Ethiopia created a receptive environment for his claims. Ṣägga Krǝstos also benefited from the enduring European fascination with Ethiopia as the mythical Christian kingdom of Prester John a legend that had long framed Ethiopia as a land of powerful, exotic Christian rulers. This association provided him with additional capital. While his interlocutors rarely confirmed or outright denied his royal lineage, they often treated him favorably. For some, he was a potential geopolitical ally; for others, an exotic presence who enhanced their social or religious prestige. His charisma and narrative made a lasting impression, and some contemporaries even developed personal affection or romantic interest in him. Ṣägga Krǝstos’s story offers insight into early modern European attitudes toward race, identity, and social mobility. As for Ṣägga Krǝstos, race defined him in death, but not in life. His case illustrates the fluid and context-dependent nature of race and reputation during this period.
