= Nicolas Robert =

French painter (1614–1685

- Born: 18 April 1614; Langres, France
- Died: 25 March 1685 (aged 70); Paris, France
- Occupations: Miniaturist, engraver
- Known for: Painter of miniatures to Louis XIV

Nicolas Robert (18 April 1614 – 25 March 1685) was a French miniaturist and engraver.

== Biography ==
He was born in Langres and died in Paris.

In 1664, he was appointed as "peintre ordinaire de Sa Majesté pur la miniature" (Painter of Miniatures) to French king Louis XIV.

== Works ==
The art curator and writer Wilfrid Blunt highlights Robert's main works as follows:

- Illustrations within the book – Guirlande de Julie – which was produced by Nicolas Jarry as a gift for Julie Lucine d'Angennes from her future husband, the Duke of Montausier. It was this work that made Robert famous and drew the attention of Gaston, Duke of Orléans.
- Paintings of flowers on vellum for Gaston and latterly for Louis XIV that form the nucleus of the Recueil des vélins now held in the French National Museum of Natural History within the Jardin des Plantes in Paris.
- Contributions to the Recueil des Plantes – a collection of engravings of flowers. Prints from these were published in the two-volume work – Estampes de Plantes and in Mémoires pour servir á l'Histoire des Plantes.

Other works include:

- Fiori Diversi, a small book of etchings of flowers published in Rome in 1640
- Diverses Fleurs, c. 1660
- Sketchbooks A & B, in the Austrian National Library, detailed in H. Walter Lack's Garden of Eden (Taschen: 2008)
- Livre des Tulipes, in the Austrian National Library, detailed in H. Walter Lack's Garden of Eden (Taschen: 2008)

== Colleagues ==
Robert worked with the following people:

- Abraham Bosse
- Louis de Chastillon
- Denis Dodart
- Robert Morison, a Scottish botanist by whom it is believed that Robert was first prompted to take an interest in scientific botanic illustration
