= Maiolino Bisaccioni =

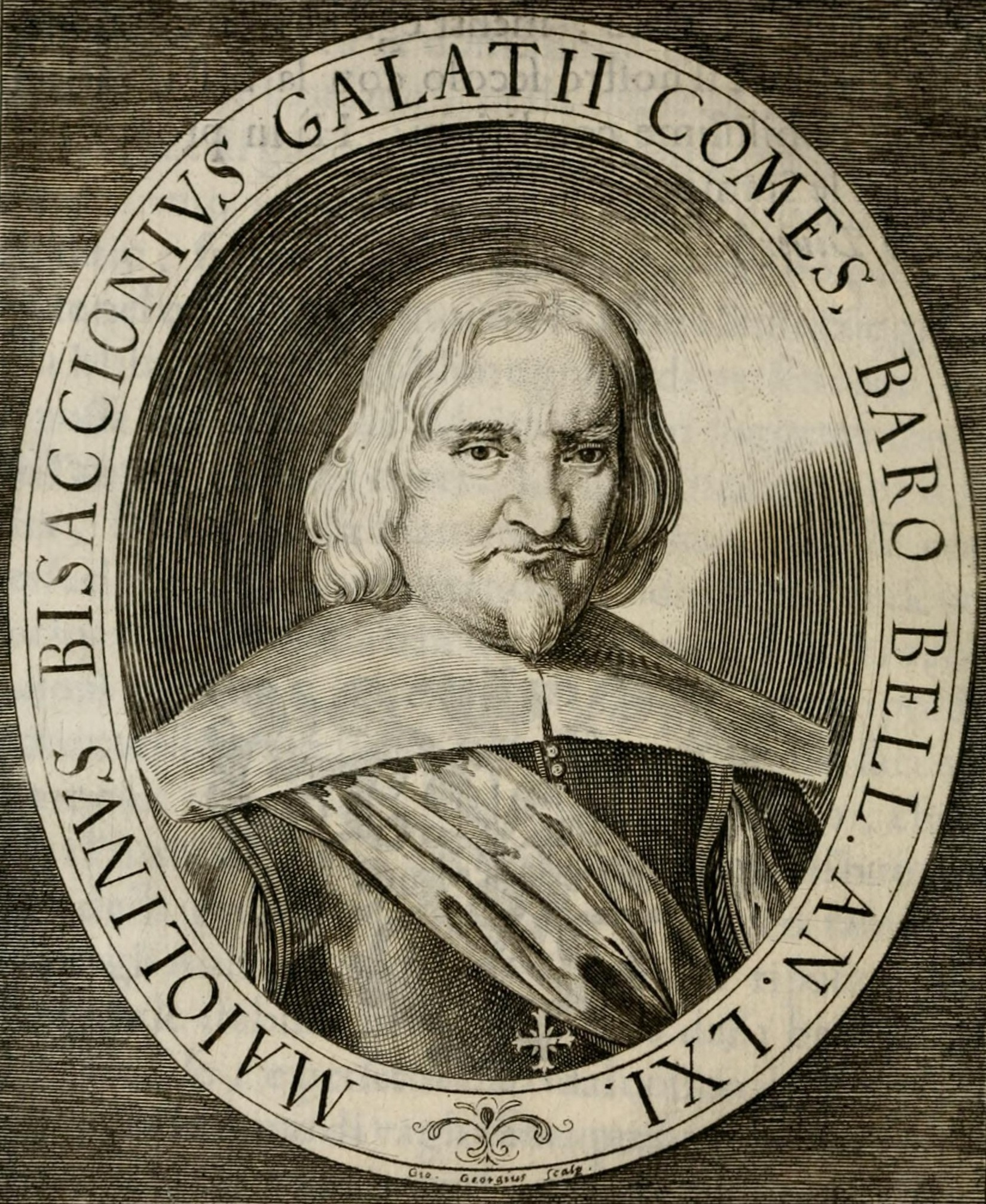
- Portrait of Maiolino Bisaccioni from the book Le glorie degli Incogniti, 1647
- Born: 1582; Ferrara, Duchy of Ferrara
- Died: 8 June 1663 (aged 80–81); Venice, Republic of Venice
- Alma mater: University of Bologna
- Military career
- Allegiance: Republic of Venice; Holy Roman Empire
- Branch: Venetian army Army of the Holy Roman Empire
- Service years: 1598–1628
- Rank: condottiere
- Conflicts: Eighty Years' War

Maiolino Bisaccioni (1582 – 8 June 1663) was an Italian mercenary and author of both novels and chronicles of contemporary history, mainly of events during the Thirty Years' Wars.

== Biography ==
Maiolino was born in Ferrara, the son of Giralamo Bisaccioni and Lucia Trotti, who were both from prominent families in Jesi. He initially studied at the University of Bologna, and obtained a doctorate in law. However he instead began a career mainly as a condottiere, that is, a mercenary captain for hire. His first campaign was fighting for the Venetian Republic under the Count of Fuentes, Governor of Milan. While stationed at the fortress of Orzinuovi near Brescia, he dueled with a veteran captain of the name of Domenico Cresti. In 1601 he was at the siege by Catholic forces of Canisca, a town at the Hungarian border. In 1603, he was back in Italy where he engaged in another duel with Alessandro Gonzaga, his commander, and this led to his expulsion from the Papal States.

He moved to the Duchy of Modena, where in the year 1610, he was appointed Podesta at Baiso. He was briefly jailed for another scuffle, this time the shooting at a Dominican friar. While in Modena he wrote a fierce criticism of Fulvio Testi. Released and promoted in the military of the duchy, he again dueled this time with the Prince of Correggio, forcing him now into exile and fighting for the Prince of Moldavia.

He fought in the defense of Vienna with the Count Bucquoy. He later rejoined the diplomatic efforts of the Papal States, traveling widely. While living in Naples, he was elected a member of the Literary Accademia degli Oziosi, and in Venice to the Accademia degli Incogniti. Bisaccioni is mainly known as an historian. He wrote histories of the Thirty Years' War (1633–7), recent civil wars (1652), and the Neapolitan Republic (1660). His most important novel, Il Demetrio moscovita (1639), recounts False Dmitry I's rise to power and tragic death.

In Venice Bisaccioni developed close ties with the French court, and was appointed valet de chambre, knight of the Order of Saint Michael, and marquis by Louis XIV. He was the foremost Italian translator of French novels of the 17th century. He translated several French contemporary novels by Madeleine de Scudéry, Jean Desmarets, and Gauthier de Costes, seigneur de la Calprenède. Between 1637 and 1664 he published four collections of short stories: La nave, L'albergo, L'isola, and Il porto. Bisaccioni is a primary source on the life of Ethiopian pretender to the throne Zaga Christ.

== Works ==
- Seconda continuazione del Commentario delle guerre successe in Alemagna, e fatti piu natabili dell'Europa dall'assedio di Costanza 1633 alla Dieta di Francoforte 1634, (1634, Venice): Second continued commentary on the wars in Germany and notable facts from the Siege of Constance in 1633 to the Diet of Frankfurt.
- Dall'Albergo Favole tratte dal vero (1638, Venice)
- Il Demetrio Muscovita, historia tragica (1649) - a novel based on the Pseudo-Demetrius I (False Dmitry I) died 1606
- Historia delle guerre civili delli ultimi tempi (1652, Parma)
- Delle Historie memorabili di nostri tempi che contengono le guerre di Germania dalla mossa del Re di Suetia doppo la Pace di Lubecca sino alla Pace di Munster, seguita l'Anno 1650 (1653, Venice)
