= Guirlande de Julie =

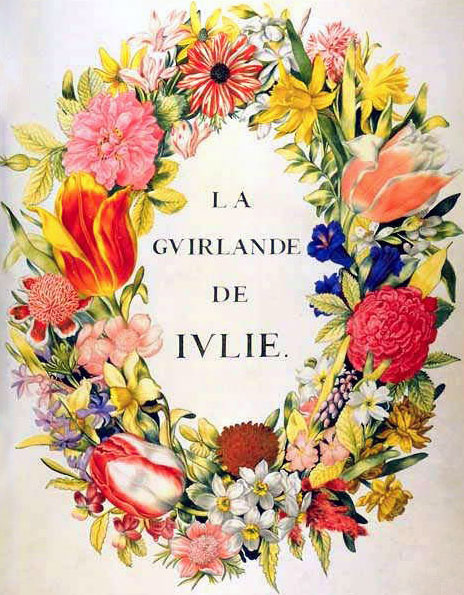
La Guirlande de Julie

The Guirlande de Julie (French pronunciation: [ɡiʁlɑ̃d də ʒyli], Julie's Garland) is a unique French manuscript of sixty-one madrigaux, illustrated with painted flowers, and composed by several poets habitués of the Hôtel de Rambouillet for Julie d'Angennes and given to her on her name day in May 1641. The 1641 manuscript was bought by the Bibliothèque nationale de France in 1989 and is now kept in the Département des Manuscrits of the BnF.

== Context ==
The salon of Catherine de Vivonne, marquise de Rambouillet (1588–1665), wife of Charles d'Angennes, marquis de Rambouillet (1577–1652), was the first and most brilliant Parisian literary salon of the first half of the 17th century, at its height between 1620 and 1645. The Hôtel de Rambouillet, as it was called, was frequented by renowned précieuses, writers, nobles and "robins".

One of its habitués, Charles de Sainte-Maure, marquis de Montausier (1610–1690), had been in love with the daughter of the marquis and marquise de Rambouillet, Julie d'Angennes (1606–1671), since he first met her in 1631. In the hope of finally wooing her, he decided to give her an extraordinary present.

== Production ==
Montausier asked the most talented poets of the time, all frequent visitors of the Hôtel de Rambouillet, to write one or several madrigals in which a flower would sing the praises of Julie. The final product was the work of nineteen poets. These madrigaux were composed by writers as famous as Georges de Scudéry, Desmarets de Saint-Sorlin, Valentin Conrart, Jean Chapelain, Racan, Tallemant des Réaux, Robert Arnauld d'Andilly, Simon Arnauld de Pomponne, Isaac Arnauld de Corbeville, Montmor, Germain Habert, Colletet, Claude Malleville, Philippe Habert, Antoine Gombaud, Antoine Godeau, Étienne Martin de Pinchesne, Pierre Corneille for a couple of the madrigals authored by "M. C." (but doubtful, according to Bibliothèque nationale de France) and the marquis de Rambouillet. Montausier himself wrote sixteen of the madrigals.

Then the text was ornamentally written by the calligraphist Nicolas Jarry and the flower quoted in each poem painted by Nicolas Robert, while the binding was done by Le Gascon. The final object turned out to be one of the most extraordinary manuscripts of the century and one of the highlights of the 17th century littérature galante.

Julie found the manuscript by her bed, upon awakening on the morning of her name day, 22 May 1641 (see 1641 in poetry). However, she let Montausier wait another four years, until 1645, before agreeing to marry him, fourteen years after they had first met.

== History of the manuscript ==
After the death of Montausier in 1690, the manuscript became the possession of the ducal Crussol family, in which his daughter, Marie-Julie de Sainte-Maure (1647-1692), duchesse of Uzès by marriage, had married. The manuscript was first sold in 1699, then several times thereafter. La Guirlande de Julie is now kept at the Département des Manuscrits of the Bibliothèque nationale de France (French National Library). It was published in 1729 (see 1729 in poetry), although several poems had already appeared in various collections.

== Bibliography ==
- La Guirlande de Julie (1641), original manuscript, Bibliothèque nationale de France, Département des Manuscrits: http://gallica.bnf.fr/ark:/12148/btv1b8451620k
- Frain, Irène, La Guirlande de Julie, Robert Laffont, Bibliothèque Nationale, Paris, 1991, ISBN 2-221-06810-6
- Lenotre, G., Le Château de Rambouillet, six siècles d'Histoire, Denoël, Paris, 1984, ISBN 2-207-23023-6.
