= Denis Dodart =

French naturalist, physician (1634–1707)

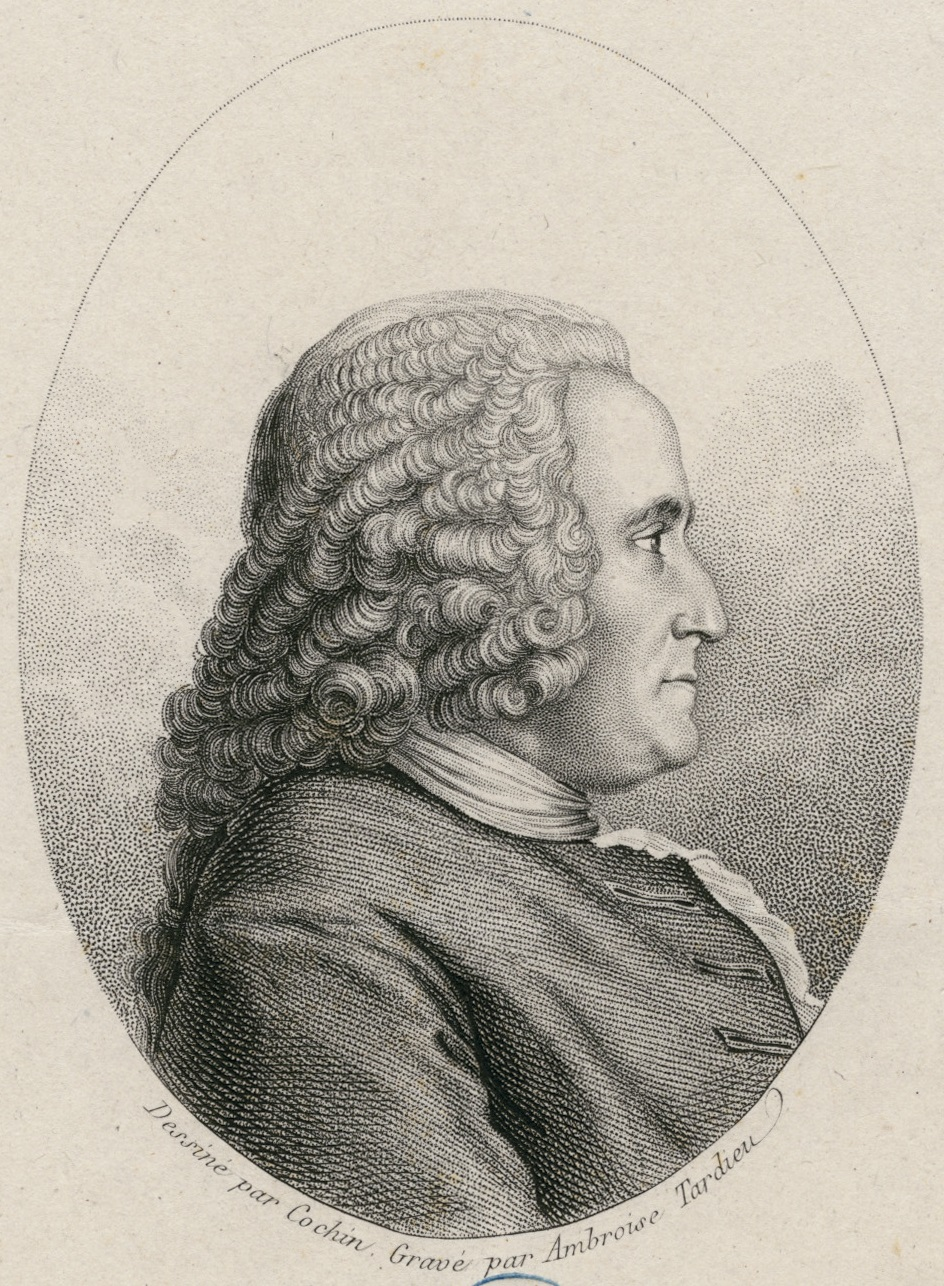
- Born: 1634; Paris, France
- Died: 5 November 1707 (aged 72–73); Paris, France
- Education: Faculté de Médecine de Paris
- Known for: Botany, medicine
- Spouse: Marie-Lucienne Le Picard
- Scientific career
- Fields: Naturalist
- Workplaces: Académie royale des Sciences

Notes
- Dodart coat of arms

Denis Dodart was a French physician, naturalist, and botanist. He was born in 1634 in Paris and died on 5 November 1707 in the same city.

== Biography ==
=== Childhood and humanist education ===
Denis Dodart was born in 1634 in a Parisian middle class family that belonged to the bourgeoisie. He was a son of Jean Dodart, notary public with a passion for literature, and Marie Dubois, daughter of a lawyer at the Parlement of Paris. He was interested in art and science since young age. He was taught Latin, Greek, music, and drawing. Fontenelle mentioned in his Éloge of Monsieur Dodart the library of the Dodart family.

He studied at the University of Paris and gained his Doctorate of Medicine on 13 October 1660. Denis Dodart was noticed for his erudition, his good eloquency, being open minded. He is described by Guy Patin, dean of the University in a private letter: "Ce jourd'hui [sic] 5 Juillet (1660) nous avons fait la Licence de nos vieux Bacheliers, ils sont 7 en nombre, dont celui qui est le plus fécond, nommé Dodart, âgé de 25 ans, est un des plus sage & des plus fçavans [sic] hommes homme de ce Siècle Ce jeune homme est un prodige de sagesse 6 de science monstrum sin vitio, comme disait Adr. Turnebus de Josepho Scaligero." He adds in another letter "Notre Licentié [sic] qui est si fçavant, s'appelle Dodart. il est le fils d'un Bourgeois de Paris, fort honnête homme. C'est un grand garçon, fort sage, fort modeste, qui sait Hipocrate, Galien, Aristote, Ciceron, Sénèque, & Fernel par coeur. C'est un garçon incomparable, qui n'a pas 26 ans, car la Faculté lui fit grace au premier Examen de quelaues mois qui lui manquait pour son âge, sur la bonne opinion qu'on avait de lui dés auparavant." In 1666 he gained the Doctor of Pharmacy title.

=== Physician of Conti family and Port-Royal ===
He was elected to the French Academy of Sciences in 1673. In botany he is notable for his early studies of plant respiration and growth. He collaborated with the French engraver Nicolas Robert in several illustrated works including Estampes de Plantes and Mémoires pour servir á l'Histoire des Plantes.

His father Jean Dodart was a Parisian notary and his mother Marie Dubois was the daughter of a lawyer. Suspicion that his parents, like many from the legal professions, had been supporters of the Fronde uprising nearly derailed his election to the Academy of Sciences.

Though most of his writings are about botany and medicine, he was also interested in music. He intended to write a history of music but did not complete it. His main extant contribution was the essay about the physical characteristics and qualities of the human voice Mémoire sur les causes de la voix de l'homme, et de ses différens tons, published in the Mémoires de l'Académie royale des sciences (1700; pp.244–93) and published separately in 1703. He also added suppléments in the Mémoires for 1706 (pp.136–48, 388–410) and 1707 (pp.66–81).

== Personal life ==
Dodart married Marie-Lucienne Le Picard, and the couple had two children, a girl and a boy. Their son Claude-Jean-Baptiste Dodart (1664 - 1730) went on to become the chief physician to King Louis XV of France.

== Eponymy ==
The nettle species Urtica dodartii was named after him by Linnaeus but this is now considered a variety of Urtica pilulifera, the Roman nettle (U. pilulifera L. var. dodartii (L.) Aschers.).

== See also ==
- Nicolas Robert

== Major works ==
- Memoires pour servir a l'histoire des plantes (in Latin). Paris: Imprimerie Royale. 1676.
