= Marie Dupré =

Seventeenth century French poet and scholar

- Born: 1650
- Died: 1700 (aged 49–50)
- Relatives: Roland Desmarets; Desmarets de Saint-Sorlin

Marie Dupré (1650 – 1700) was a seventeenth century French poet and scholar.

Marie Dupré was the related to the poet Desmarets de Saint-Sorlin of the French Academy and niece of Roland Desmarets. Dupré intended to follow her families traditions and was lucky that her uncles, a lawyer and a man of letters, were able to assist her. She was taught Latin, Italian, Greek, rhetoric, poetics and philosophy. Dupré studied Descartes and had a quick wit. Her ability to argue her point with such application garnered her the nickname "La Cartésienne". Dupré was friends with Madeleine de Scudéry and Anne de La Vigne. She spoke good Italian and wrote French verse. Dupré is the author of the Responses of Isis to Climene from the Collection of verses published by Dominique Bouhours. Évrard Titon du Tillet included Dupré in the list of ladies who he felt deserved praise. She was well known and admired within the French Salon of the day.
