= Giovanna Garzoni =

Italian artist (1600–1670)

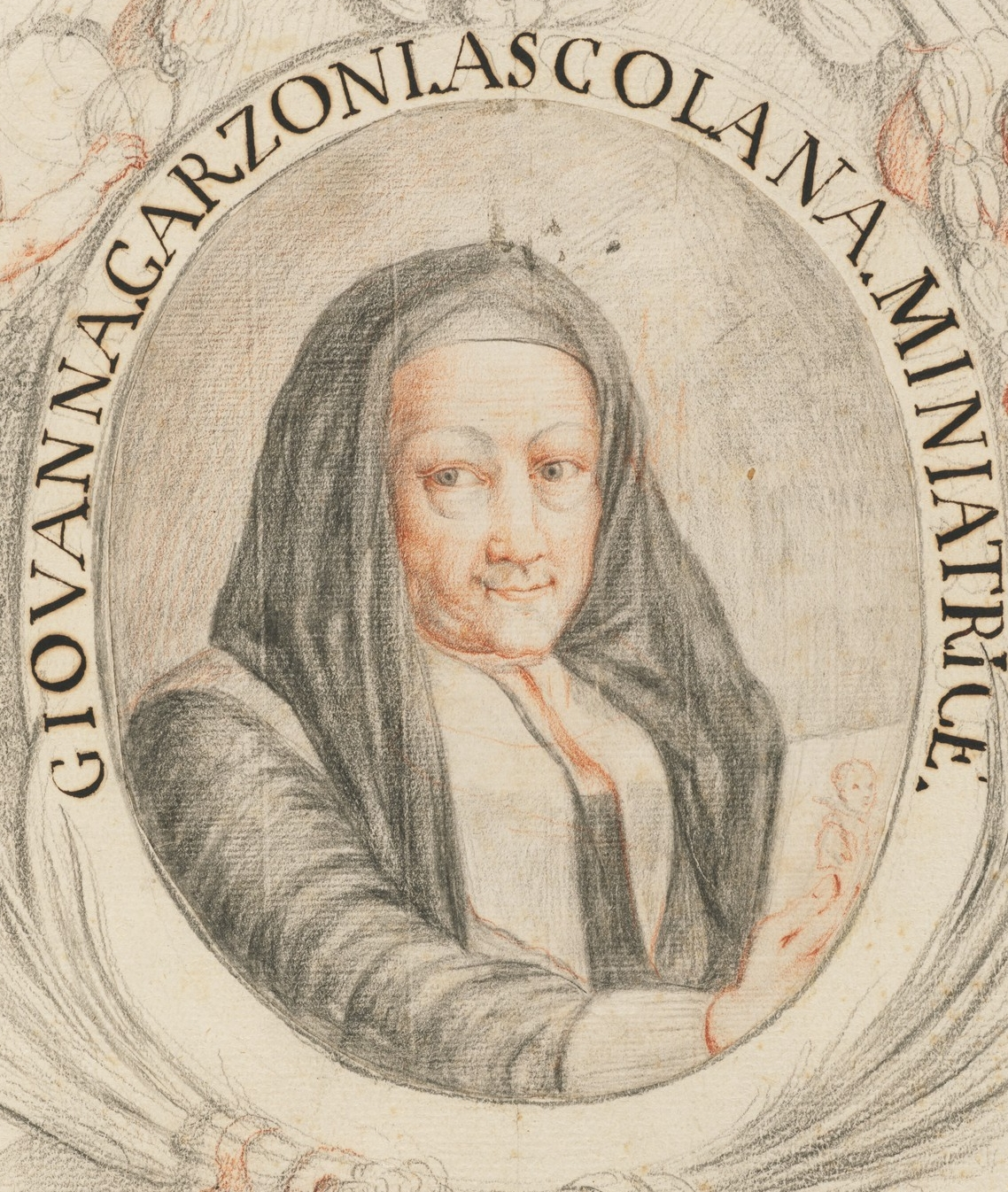
Giovanna Garzoni, self-portrait

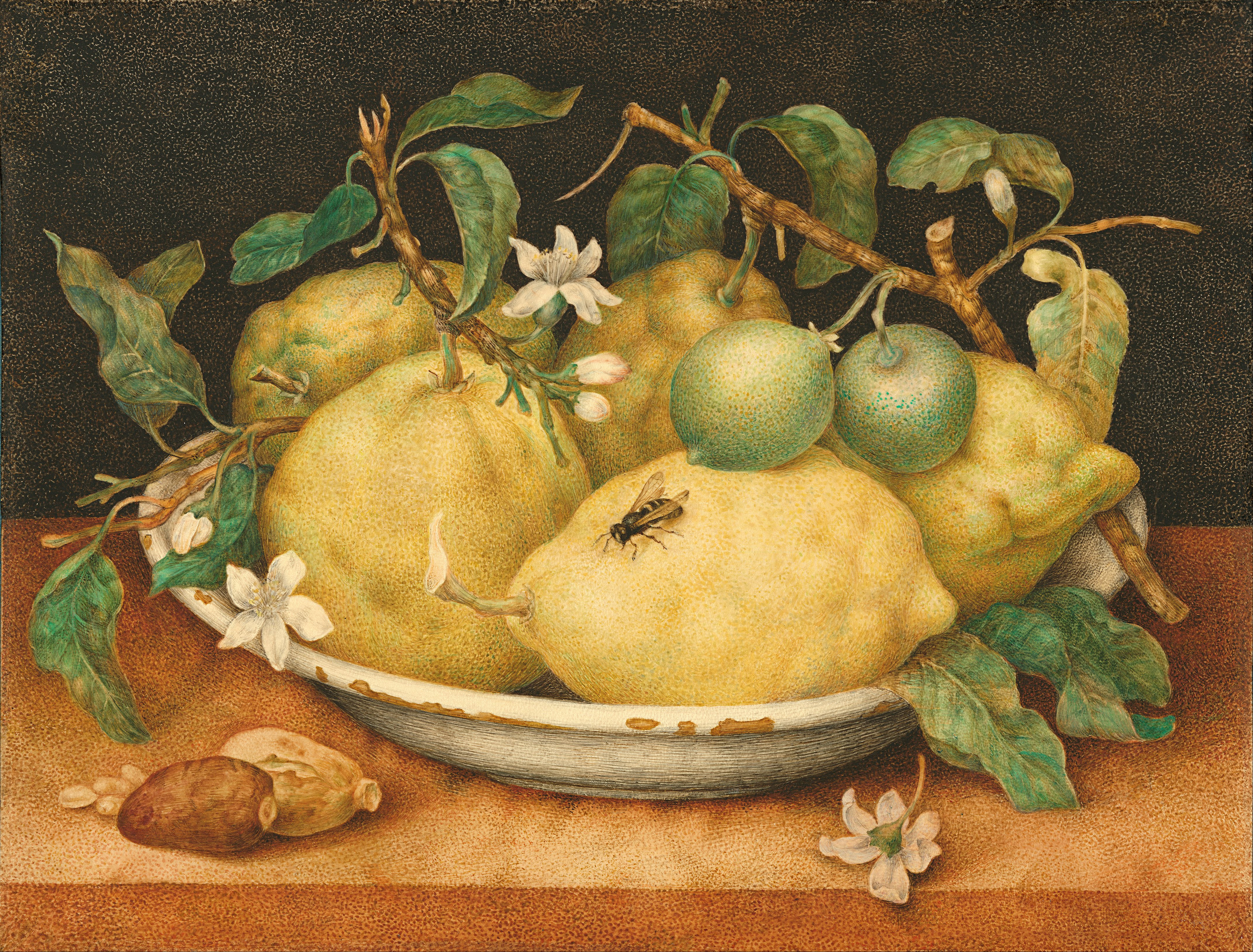
Still Life with Bowl of Citrons, late 1640s, now in J. Paul Getty Museum.

Giovanna Garzoni (1600 – February 1670) was an Italian Baroque painter. She began her career painting religious, mythological, and allegorical subjects but gained fame for her still life botanical subjects painted in tempera and watercolour. Her works were praised for their precision and balance and for the exactitude of the objects depicted. More recently, her paintings have been seen to have female bodily associations and proto-feminist sentiments. She combined objects very inventively, including Asian porcelain, exotic seashells, and botanical specimens. She was often called the Chaste Giovanna due to her vow to remain a virgin. Scholars have speculated Garzoni may have been influenced by fellow botanical painter Jacopo Ligozzi although details about Garzoni's training are unknown.

== Early life ==
Giovanna Garzoni was born in 1600 in Ascoli Piceno in the Marche district of Italy to Giacomo Garzoni and Isabetta Gaia. Both of Garzoni's parents were of Venetian origin and are believed to have come from a long line of Venetian painters - a fact that is often disputed. Garzoni's grandfather Nicola and Uncle Vincenzo from her mother's side were both goldsmiths while her other uncle, Pietro Gaia, was a painter who studied under Palma the Younger. Historians have widely speculated that Garzoni started off her career as an apprentice under her uncle sometime before 1615. Garzoni also had a brother, Mattio, with whom she would travel throughout her career.

== Career ==
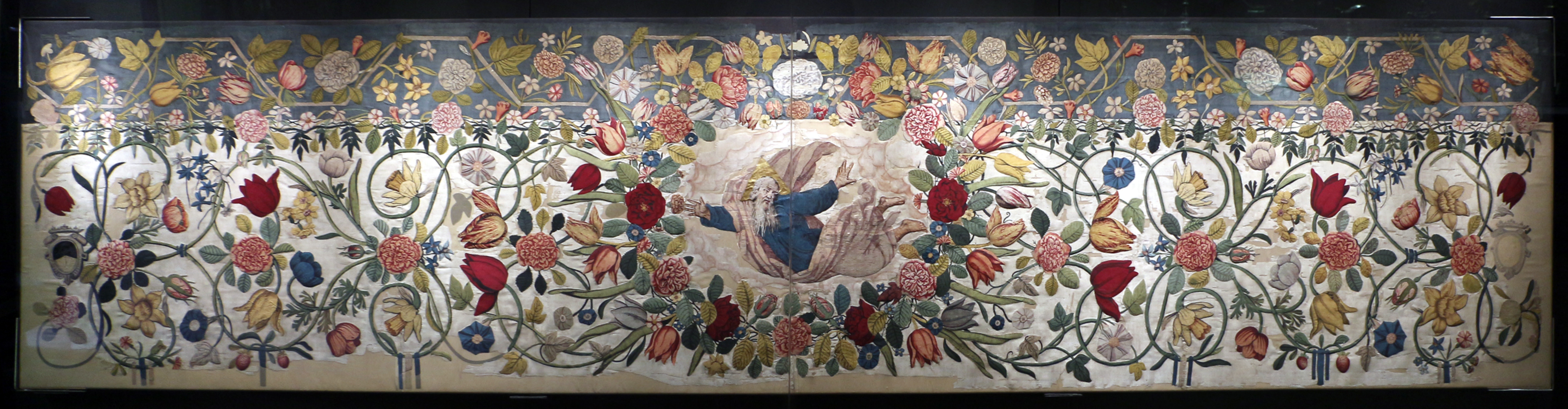
Taffeta antependium embroidered in silk with flowers around central medallion of God in splendour, 1640–1650. Uffizi Gallery.

Garzoni's first known commission was in the city where she grew up, Rome. It was in 1616, from the chemist Giovanni Vorvino to paint a herbarium. Garzoni visited the Medici court in Florence sometime between 1618 and 1620, where she probably encountered Artemisia Gentileschi. Four years later in 1620 Garzoni arrived in Venice and painted a Saint Andrew for the Venetian Church of the Ospedale degli Incurabili. Garzoni stayed in Venice for a few more years and during that time attended the calligraphy school of Giacomo Rogni. Shortly after her studies, Garzoni produced a book of cursive characters illustrated with birds, flowers and insects called the Libro de'caratteri Cancellereschi Corsivi (Biblioteca Accademica di San Luca, Rome).

After finishing her education, Garzoni and her brother Mattio left Venice in 1630 for Naples where she worked for the Spanish viceroy, the Duke of Alcalá. Garzoni may have travelled with Gentileschi. Garzoni remained in Naples for a year before returning to Rome in 1631. Garzoni's stay in Rome was short lived however, due to Christina of France's persistent efforts to have the artist come to Turin to serve as the miniaturist for the Turinese court. Garzoni reached Turin in 1632 and lived there until 1637. After staying in Turin, Garzoni became familiar with the work of fellow artists Fede Galizia and Panfilo Nuvolone. A few years later in 1640, Garzoni arrived in Paris and stayed there until 1642 when she went to Rome. Garzoni traveled back and forth from Rome to Florence until 1651 where her primary clients were in the Medici Family, particularly Grand Duke Ferdinando II, Grand Duchess Victoria, and Cardinal Giovan Carlo.

After serving the Medici Court, Garzoni decided to settle in Rome in 1651 where she worked continue producing work for the Florentine Court. As well as painting, Garzoni attended the Accademia di San Luca, where she followed events and discussion aimed at educating, socializing, and professionalizing painters, architects and sculptors of Rome. It is noted by several historians that Garzoni's pieces were so well received by the public; she was able to ask any price for her paintings.

== Notable works and clients ==
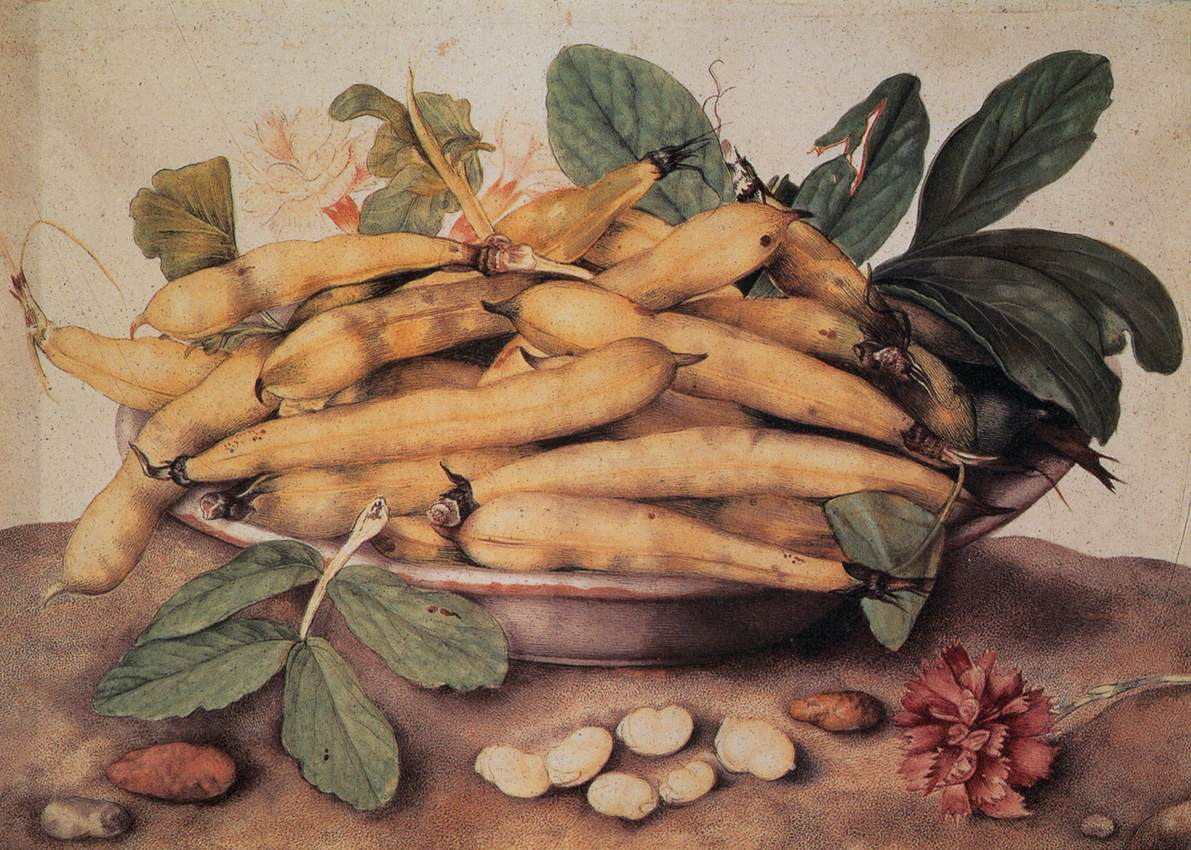
Plate with White Beans, ca. 1650–1662. Gouache on parchment. Galleria Paletina, Florence.

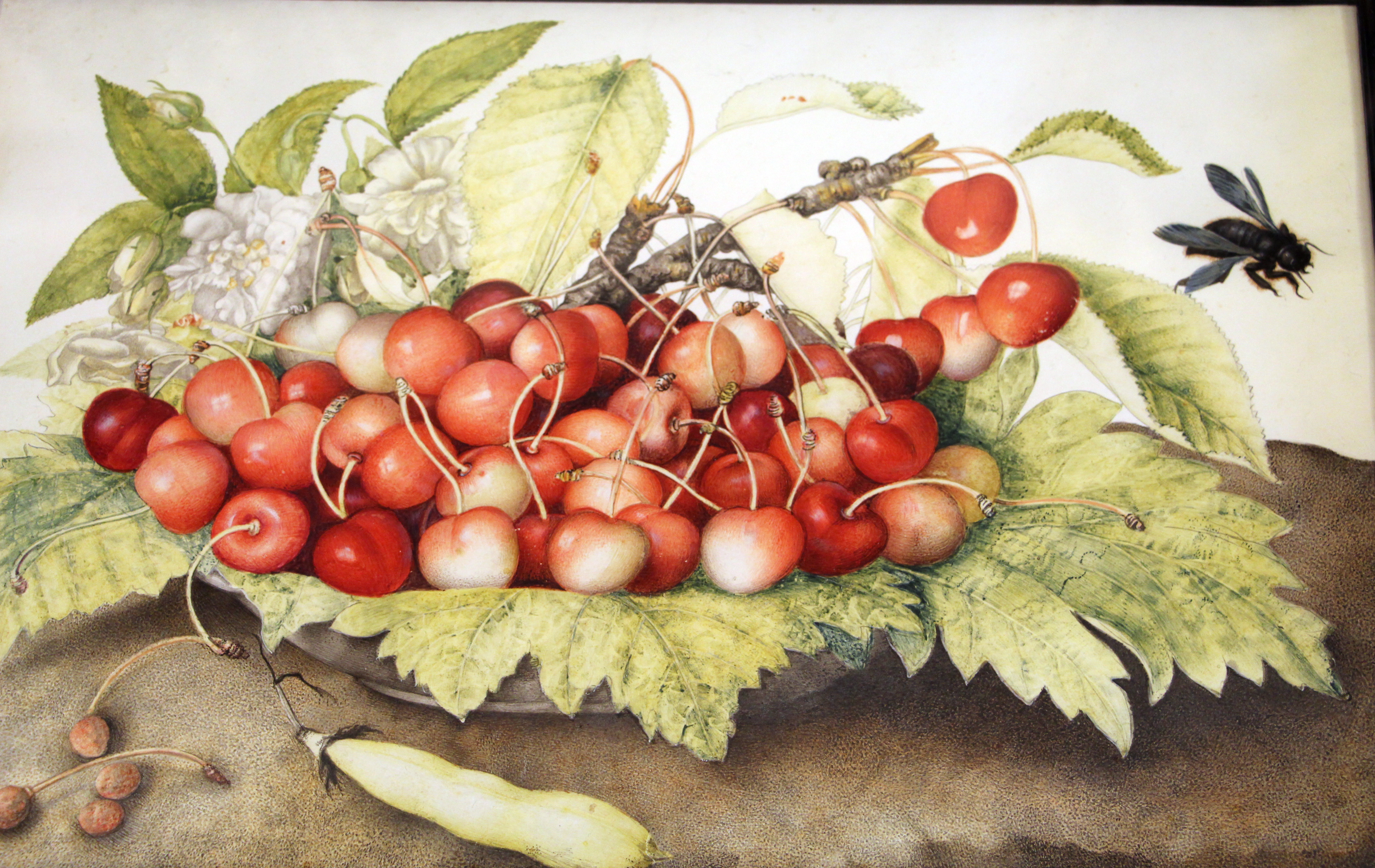
Piatto di ciliege con rose, baccello e ape legnaiola

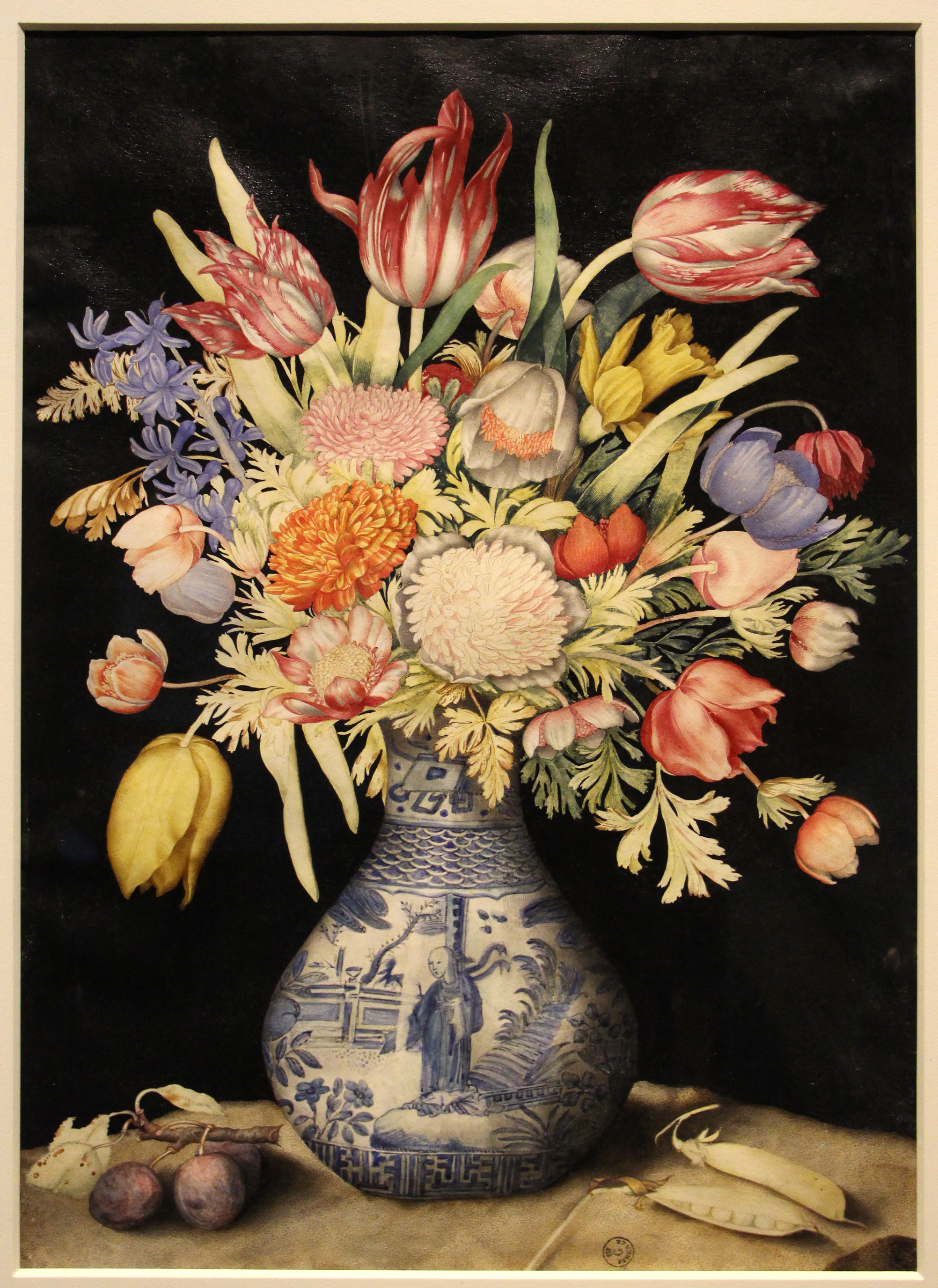
Vaso cinese con tulipani e altri fiori, due susine e due piselli, c.1641-52

One of Garzoni's earliest works, Self-portrait as Apollo in which she appears rational and contained, appears to have been modelled on Gentileschi's Self-portrait as a Lute Player, although to very different ends.

Around 1626–1633, Cassiano dal Pozzo acquired several studies of citrus fruit painted in watercolor on parchment by Garzoni for a treatise about the fruit. One study of citrus fruit from dal Pozzo's collection, attributed to Garzoni, was sold Sotheby's, New York, 25 January 2011, Lot 122. She probably had links to the Accademia dei Lincei.

In 1635, Garzoni made the first known portrait miniature of a Black person, Ethiopian traveller Zaga Christ (c. 1616–1638), possibly commissioned by Christ himself as a present for the French court.

Plate with White Beans:

Plate with White Beans was one of the several works of art commissioned by the Medici family. The still life, painted sometime between 1650 and 1662, is a naturalistic study of beans in various stages of ripeness and decay. It is collection of the Galleria Palatina in Florence.

Portrait of Carlo Emanuele I, Duke of Savory:

Created between 1623 and 1637 when Garzoni was invited to work for the court of Turin by Christina of France in 1632, this painting is now located in Palazzo Reale, Turin and was last restored in 1995.

Still Life with a Basket of Fruit, a Vase with Carnations and Shells on a Table:

This gouache on vellum piece is one of the twenty still-life miniatures that Garzoni produced for the Medici family from the years 1650–1662. The piece depicts carnations, conch shells, as well as a basket of fruit. Due to her work for the Medici Court, Garzoni became a favorite within the Florentine court for her depictions of nature and botanical subjects. It is now located in the Wallace and Wilhelmina Holladay Collection in Washington, DC.

Two important manuscript notebooks by Garzoni exist. The rare books library in Washington DC, Dumbarton Oaks, contains a self-portrait of the elderly artist, in addition to a number of botanical studies. Another album, held by the Accademia di San Luca, the artists' institute to which Garzoni left her estate, includes flower studies and still lifes.

== Personal life ==
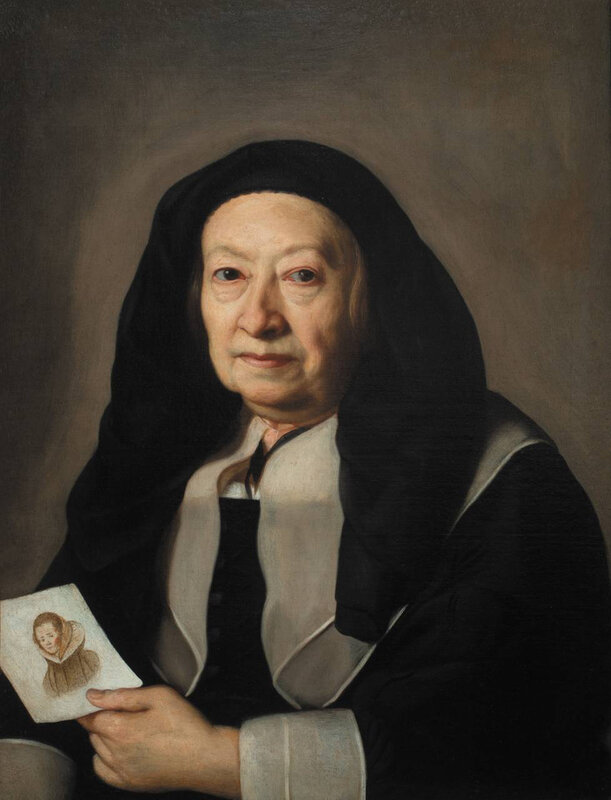
Portrait of Giovanna Garzoni by Carlo Maratti, c. 1665

It is believed by historians that Garzoni never married, but others speculate that the artist was once married to Venetian portrait painter Tiberio Tinelli in 1622. If so, the marriage was short lived, possibly resulting in separation in 1624.

== Death ==
In 1666, Garzoni devised a will that left her estate to the Church of Santa Martina, the church of the Accademia di San Luca on the basis that she would be buried in the church. Garzoni died in Rome in February 1670 at the age of 70. Today, Garzoni's tomb remains at the Church of Santa Martina but it was not interred there until 1698, nearly 29 years after her death. Roman painter Giuseppe Ghezzi's portrait of Garzoni is also located at the Accademia.

== Exhibitions ==
"La grandezza del universo" nell'arte di Giovanna Garzoni / "The immensity of the universe" in the art of Giovanna Garzoni, Florence, Gallerie degli Uffizi, Palazzo Pitti, Andito degli Angiolini, 28 May - 28 June 2020, exhib. cat. edited by Sheila Barker.

Le Signore dell'Arte. Storie di donne tra '500 e '600, Milan, Palazzo Reale, 02.03.2021 to 22.08.2021, curated by Anna Maria Bava, Gioia Mori and Alain Tapié, exhib. cat published by Skira.

By Her Hand: Artemisia Gentileschi and Women Artists in Italy, 1500–1800, Wadsworth Atheneum and the Detroit Institute of Arts, September 30, 2021 – January 9, 2022, exhib. cat Yale University Press, edited by Eve Straussman-Pflanzer and Oliver Tostmann

Making Her Mark: A History of Women Artists in Europe, 1400-1800, Baltimore Museum of Art and the Art Gallery of Ontario, October 1, 2023 – July 1, 2024, exhib. cat Goose Lane, edited by Andaleeb Banta, Alexa Greist, and Theresa Kutasz Christensen

== Sources ==
- Ferraro, Joanne M. Marriage Wars in Late Renaissance Venice. (New York: Oxford University Press, 2001).
- Fortune, Jane, and Linda Falcone. Invisible Women. (Florence: The Florentine Press, 2010).
- Frick, Carole Collier, Stefania Biancani, and Elizabeth S. G. Nicholson. Italian Women Artists: from Renaissance to Baroque. (Milano: Skira, 2007).
- McTighe, Sheila. Foods and the Body in Italian Genre Paintings, about 1580: Campi, Passarotti, Carracci. The Art Bulletin, College Art Association 86 (2004):301–323, doi 10.2307/3177419.
- Anon. The Flowering of Florence: Botanical Art for the Medici. National Gallery of Art. Accessed October 22, 2014.
- The History of the Accademia di San Luca, c. 1590–1635: Archived from the Archivio di Stato di Roma. National Gallery of Art.
- Vigué, Jordi. Great Women Masters of Art. (New York: Watson-Guptill, 2003).
