= Za Dengel =

Emperor of Ethiopia from 1603 to 1604

Emperor of Ethiopia
- Reign: September 1603 – 24 October 1604
- Predecessor: Yaqob
- Successor: Yaqob
- Died: 24 October 1604; Bartcho, Ethiopian Empire
- Spouse: Woizero Wangelawit
Regnal name
- Atsnaf Sagad II
- Dynasty: House of Solomon
- Father: Lesana Krestos

Za Dengel (Ge'ez: ዘድንግል; died 24 October 1604), throne name Atsnaf Sagad II (Ge'ez: አጽናፍ ሰገድ) was Emperor of Ethiopia from 1603 until his death in 1604. He was a member of the Solomonic dynasty and one of only two Catholic emperors in Ethiopian history.

== Ancestry ==
Of Amhara lineage, Za Dengel was the son of Lesana Krestos; brother of Emperor Sarsa Dengel. The Spanish Jesuit Pedro Paez, who lived in Ethiopia, described the Emperor's appearance during their meeting as follows: "He seemed to be about 26 years of age, tall, well-shaped, and manly. His eyes were large and beautiful, and his nose was sharp. His lips were thin, but his complexion was somewhat tawny; and were it not for the color, which in Europe is reckoned unbecoming, he would not have been inferior to the finest men among us.'"

== Reign ==
Za Dengel may have been married to Woizero Wangelawit, eldest daughter of his second cousin Susenyos (later emperor) and lady Wolde Saala of Walaqa and Marabete (later Empress Sultan Mogassa).

Sarsa Dengel had intended to make his nephew as his heir, recognizing that to avert the civil war that would likely follow his death an adult would be needed, and the emperor's own sons were quite young. These plans were changed primarily through the influence of Empress Sena Maryam, stepmother of Emperor's eldest surviving son Prince Yaqob, who was made emperor in 1597. The empress had Za Dengel seized and confined in a religious retreat on the island of Dek in Lake Tana. Za Dengel eventually managed to escape, taking refuge in Gojjam.

In 1603, Za Dengel was made Emperor by Ras Za Sellase, who intended Za Dengel to be little more than a figurehead. He was crowned as Asnaf Segad ('He to whom the horizons bow'). However, Za Dengel summoned the Jesuit Pedro Páez to his court at Dankaz, who persuaded him to embrace Catholicism.

This religious conversion led to Za Sellase not only withdrawing his support, but actively working against him and stirred up a revolt in Gojjam. Za Dengel marched to the plain of Bartcho to put down this revolt, but despite the help of 200 Portuguese musketeers Za Dengel perished in battle on 24 October. According to James Bruce, Za Dengel's corpse lay unclaimed on the battlefield for three days, until some peasants buried it "in a little building, like a chapel (which I have seen), not above six feet high, under the shade of a very fine tree, in Abyssinia called sassa." The body was reinterred 10 years later in Daga Estifanos monastery on Daga Island in Lake Tana.

== Notes ==
Regnal titles
Preceded by Yaqob	Emperor of Ethiopia; 1603–1604	Succeeded by Yaqob
