= Yaqob of Ethiopia =

Emperor of Ethiopia from 1597 to 1606

Yaqob ዐፄ ያዕቆብ

Emperor of Ethiopia
- Predecessor: Sarsa Dengel
- Successor: Susenyos I
- Reign: 1597–1603
- Reign: 1604–1607
- Born: c. 1590
- Died: 10 March 1607 (aged 16–17)
- Spouse: Nazarena
- Issue: Cosmas, Saga Krestos
Regnal name
- Malak Sagad II
- Dynasty: House of Solomon
- Father: Sarsa Dengel
- Mother: Empress Maryam Sena
- Religion: Ethiopian Orthodox

Yaqob (Ge'ez: ያዕቆብ; c. 1590 – 10 March 1607), throne name Malak Sagad II (Ge'ez: መለክ ሰገድ), was Emperor of Ethiopia from 1597 to 1607, and a member of the Solomonic dynasty. He was the eldest surviving son of Sarsa Dengel. According to E. A. Wallis Budge, Yaqob's mother was Empress Maryam Sena; others sources suggest she was Emebet Harego of the Beta Israel. Because Yaqob had at least three sons before his death, it is likely he was born no later than 1590. Most Ethiopian sources including Tekle Tsadik Mekuria however state that his mother was Harego, but that Empress Maryam Sena championed his right to the throne as she only bore Emperor Sarsa Dengel daughters, and hoped to dominate a long term regency for the boy monarch.

== Life ==
Sarsa Dengel had intended to make his nephew Za Dengel his successor, but under the influence of his wife Maryam Sena and a number of his sons-in-law, he instead chose Yaqob, who was seven when he came to the throne, with Ras Antenatewos of Begemder as his regent. Za Dengel and the other rival for the throne – Susenyos, the son of Abeto Fasilides – were exiled, but Za Dengel escaped to the mountains around Lake Tana, while Susenyos found refuge in the south amongst the Oromo.

When Yaqob came to adulthood six years later, he quarrelled with Ras Antenatewos, and had him replaced with Ras Za Sellase. However, Za Sellase deposed Yaqob, exiling him to Ennarea, and made his cousin Za Dengel Emperor. When Za Dengel proved more troublesome than Yaqob, Za Sellase recalled Yaqob from exile.

Not long after Za Dengel was defeated and killed in battle, Susenyos marched north at the head of an army raised amongst the Oromo, and sent a message to Ras Antenatewos proclaiming himself as emperor and demanding support from Antenatewos. Unable to communicate with Za Sellase, the Ras sent his troops to support Susenyos. A similar message to Za Sellase only served to steel Za Sellase into action: he marched on Susenyos, who, sick from fever, retreated into the mountains of Amhara. This lack of resolve convinced Ras Antenatewos to waver in his support, and as the rainy season passed Za Sellase began to negotiate his submission to Susenyos. At this moment Yaqob revealed himself in Dembiya and both Ras Antenatewos and Za Sellase flocked to his side.

Susenyos managed to first surprise and decimate the forces of Za Sellase at Manta Dafar in Begemder; when Za Sellase escaped to Yaqob's camp, the Emperor's derision caused Za Sellase to defect to Susenyos. For several days, the armies of the two rival emperors maneuvered in the mountains of Gojjam, to at last meet in the Battle of Gol 10 March 1607, where Yaqob and the Coptic Archbishop Abuna Petros II were killed in battle, and his troops slaughtered.

== Issue ==
According to Zaga Christ, Yaqob had married some years before a foreigner named Nazarena, a Roman, by whom he had three sons, one of whom died before the Battle of Gol. Nazarena sent her surviving sons to safety in exile: Cosmas, the older, went south and was not heard of again; the younger, Saga Krestos, went to the safety of the Kingdom of Sennar, where he was treated well and came of age. When King Rabat proposed that Saga Krestos marry his daughter, Saga Krestos refused, and was forced to flee to another refuge, adopting Roman Catholicism while at Jerusalem. Eventually he found his way to Rome (1632), and eventually to Paris, where he was given lodgings by Cardinal Richelieu. Saga Krestos died of pleurisy in 1638 at the age of 38. Thomas Pakenham provides a brief sketch of Saga Krestos' European life in his The Mountains of Rasselas, and the book ends with a description of Pakenham's visit to Saga Krestos' grave in Rueil-Malmaison.

However, O. G. S. Crawford has cast doubts on this story. In an article that discusses the surviving sources for the story of Saga Krestos, he points out a number of problems in his story which include a discrepancy over the possible date of his birth (i.e., Saga Krestos is likely to have been born in either 1610 or 1616, whereas Yaqob died in 1607), and the story of three Ethiopian monks who report that Saga Krestos was an apostate monk who wandered from place to place begging for money.

Regnal titles
Preceded by Sarsa Dengel	Emperor of Ethiopia; 1597–1603	Succeeded by Za Dengel
Preceded by Za Dengel	Emperor of Ethiopia; 1604–1607	Succeeded by Susenyos I
