= Yolyos =

17th century Ethiopian noble

Yolyos (Ge'ez: ዮልዮስ yōlyōs, "Julius") (Note: Cognate equivalent: Julius. Also spelled in sources as Iulios) was an early 17th-century Ethiopian noble. He was appointed by Emperor Susenyos as governor of various provinces such as Ifat and Shewa, taking the traditional Ifat title of "Walashma." He took part in several attempts to overthrow Susenyos.

In 1612 Yolyos and Keflo rebelled against Susenyos. They were tried and found guilty and sentenced to death. However, Susenyos spared their lives. Yolyos was pardoned and released from detention after eight days, after Malakotawit having pleaded with her father for clemency.

In 1617 there was a conspiracy to overthrow Emperor Susenyos, organized by his close relatives, his officials and nobility who opposed his religious policy, and those who were disaffected by his wars and the amount of annual military expeditions. According to Pedro Paez, a confidante of Susenyos, the principal leader of the conspiracy was Yolyos.

His headquarters in Ifat was on an amba, a natural flat-topped mountain fortress, at Gefegef, which he used to defend against nearby Muslims of Qecheno.

After Yolyos demise, Abuna Simon was soon after executed.
