= Charles d'Angennes =

French noble and diplomat

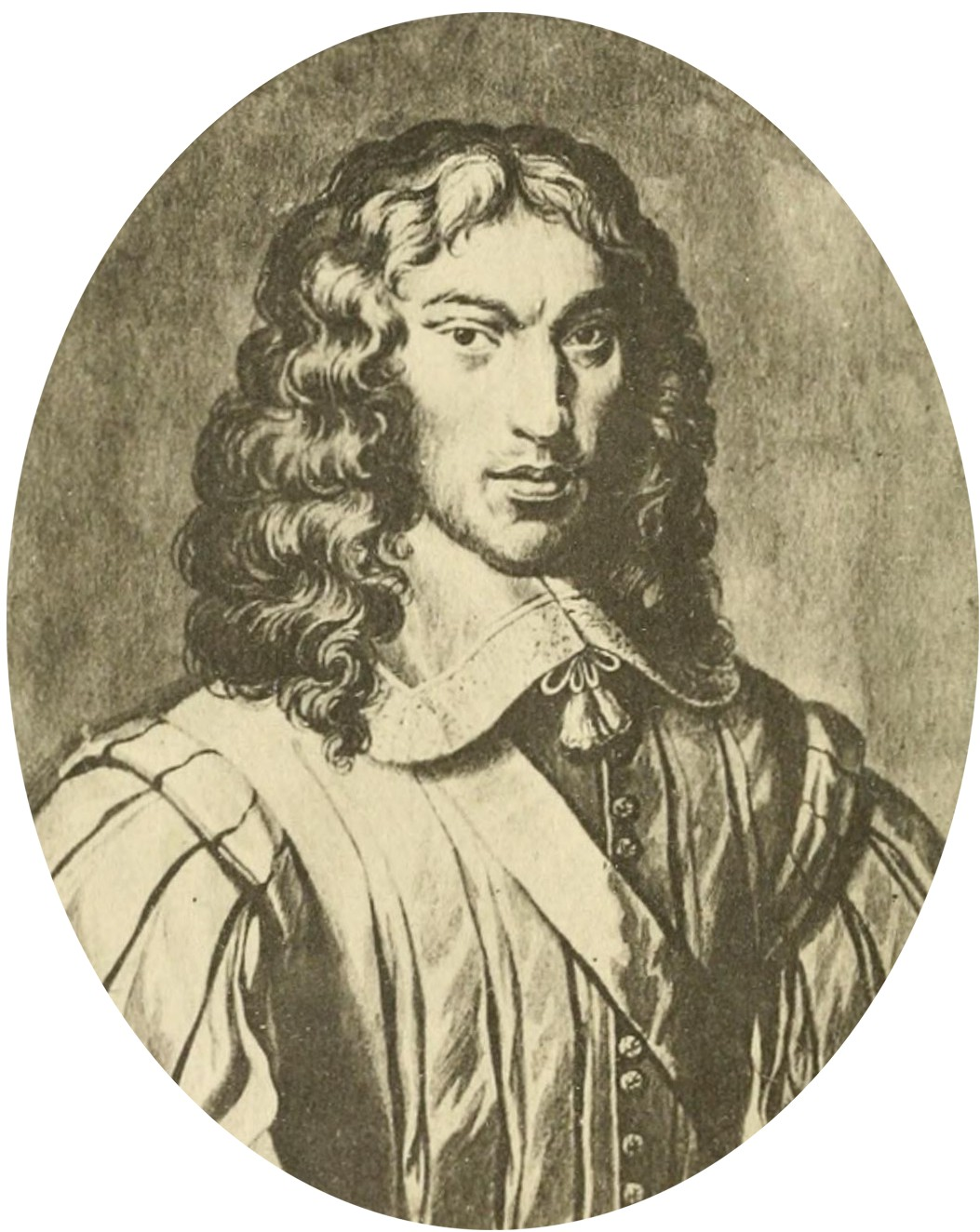
Portrait of Charles d'Angennes (1577–1652)

Charles d'Angennes, marquis de Rambouillet (1577 – Paris, 26 February 1652) was a French noble and diplomat.

== Biography ==
He was the only son of Nicolas d'Angennes and Julienne d'Arquenay.

He became lord then marquis of Rambouillet (1612) and Pisani, Baron de Talmont, Lord of Arquenay, Vidame & Sénéchal du Mans, captain of the 2nd company of the Hundred Gentlemen of the Household of the King. In 1610 he was appointed Grand Master of the King's Wardrobe and a Knight in the Order of the Holy Spirit (1619). He was also State Councilor, Colonel-General of the Italian Infantry (1620) and Maréchal de camp (1620).

Appointed Ambassador of France to the Savoyard state, he negotiated in 1614 and then in 1615, during the War of the Montferrat Succession, the first and second peace treaties between Louis XIII and the Duke of Savoy. In 1627 he was sent as extraordinary ambassador to the Savoyard state and Spain.

=== Marriage and children ===
In 1600 he married Catherine de Vivonne, who became an important society hostess and a major figure in the literary history of 17th-century France. They had 7 children:

- Julie (1607–1671), Première dame d'honneur to the Queen of France, married Charles de Sainte-Maure, duc de Montausier, had issue
- Claire (1610–1670), Abbess of the Yerres Abbey
- Léon-Pompée (1615–1645), killed at the Battle of Nördlingen (1645)
- Louise-Isabelle (1617–1707), Abbess of Saint-Etienne de Reims
- Catherine-Charlotte (1622–1691), Abbess of the Yerres Abbey
- Louis (1623–1631), died of the Plague
- Angélique-Claire (1624–1664), married François Adhémar de Monteil, Comte de Grignan, had issue.
