= Anne de La Vigne =

French poet

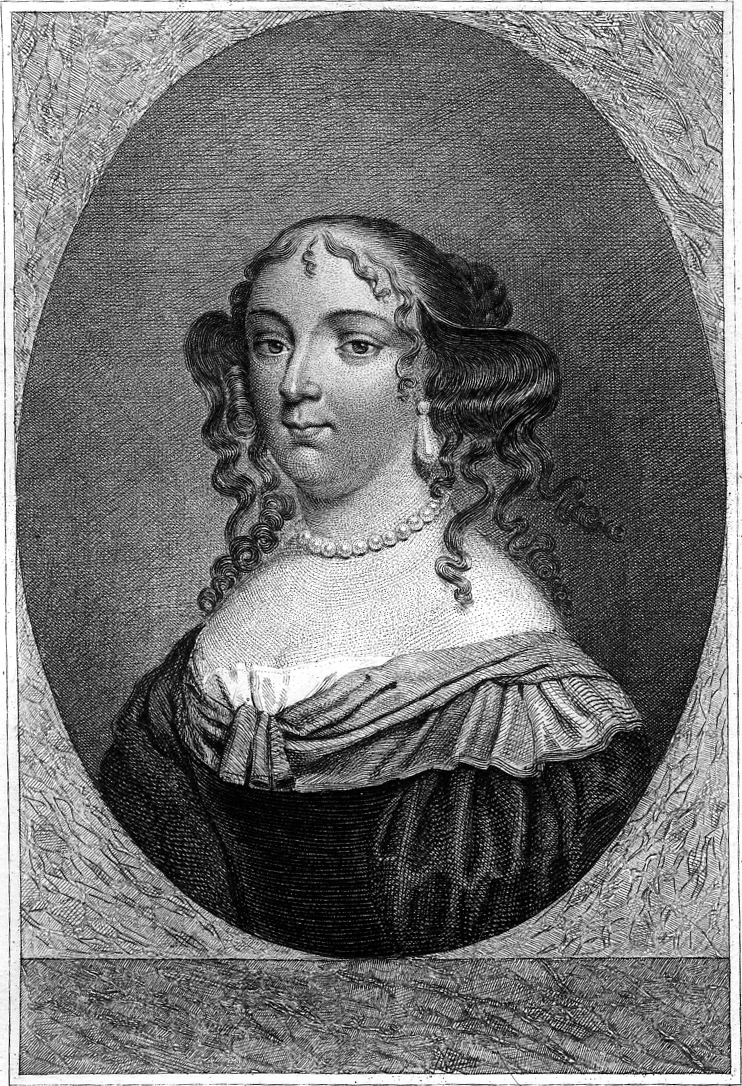
- Engraving from 1845
- Born: 1634; Vernon, Normandy, France
- Died: 1684 (aged 49–50); Paris, France
- Occupations: Poet, writer
- Father: Michel de La Vigne

Anne de La Vigne (1634–1684) was a French poet and natural philosopher who was a follower of René Descartes.

== Life ==
She was born in Vernon, Normandy in 1634. Her father was the French physician Michel de La Vigne. She died in Paris at the age of 50. She was a friend of Mademoiselle de Scuderi and Marie Dupré.

She belonged to the Academy of the Ricovrati at Padua, Italy (from 1998 called the Accademia Galileiana). In those times, the end of the 17th century, the academy was one of only a few in Europe that welcomed women as members, although they had no voting rights.

She was distinguished for her poetical talents.

Her ode, entitled "Monseigneur le Dauphin au Roi," obtained great reputation.

== Works ==
- Ode sur les conquestes du Roy, Paris, S. Mabre-Cramoisy, 1673
- Les Dames à Mlle de Scudéry, ode, Paris, 1672
- "Quelques poèmes" in Chefs-d'œuvre poétiques des dames françaises.
