= Antoine Gombaud =

French writer (1607–1684)

Antoine Gombaud, alias Chevalier de Méré, (1607 – 29 December 1684) was a French writer, born in Poitou. Although he was not a nobleman, he adopted the title chevalier (knight) for the character in his dialogues who represented his own views (chevalier de Méré because he was educated at Méré). Later his friends began calling him by that name.

== Life ==
Gombaud was an important Salon theorist. Like many 17th century liberal thinkers, he distrusted both hereditary power and democracy, a stance at odds with his self-bestowed noble title. He believed that questions are best resolved in open discussions among witty, fashionable, intelligent people.

Gombaud's most famous essays are L'honnête homme (The Honest Man) and Discours de la vraie honnêteté (Discourse on True Honesty), but he is far better known for his contribution to probability theory. He was an amateur mathematician who became interested in a problem that dates to medieval times, if not earlier, the problem of the points. Suppose two players agree to play a certain number of games, say a best-of-seven series, and are interrupted before they can finish. How should the stake be divided among them if, say, one has won three games and the other has won one?

In keeping with his Salon methods, Gombaud enlisted the Mersenne salon to solve it. Two famous mathematicians, Blaise Pascal and Pierre de Fermat, took up the challenge. In a series of letters they laid the foundation for the modern theory of probability.

Gombaud claimed that he had discovered probability theory himself, a claim not taken seriously by the mathematicians involved. He also claimed that his probability calculations showed that mathematics was inconsistent, and argued elsewhere that mathematicians were wrong in thinking that lines are infinitely divisible.

== See also ==
- Guirlande de Julie
