= Michel de La Vigne =

French physician

- Born: 1588; Vernon, Eure, France
- Died: 14 June 1648 (aged about 60)
- Education: Faculty of Medicine, Paris
- Known for: Treatment of fevers
- Children: Anne de La Vigne , Claude de La Vigne
- Scientific career
- Fields: Medicine
- Institutions: Court of Louis XIII
- Patrons: Louis XIII

Michel de La Vigne, born in Vernon in 1588 and died on 14 June 1648, was a French physician.

== Life ==
Michel de La Vigne's father, a local magistrate in Vernon under the Catholic League, sent him to Paris to an uncle who was the King's chaplain. A student prodigy, he professed rhetoric even before completing his medical studies and was obliged, to obtain his title as a doctor, to wait until the age prescribed by the statutes of the Faculty.

Qualified as doctor in 1614, he acquired a solid reputation in treating fevers. Louis XIII called him to his side and wanted no other doctor during his last illness. Elected dean of the Faculty of Medicine of Paris, La Vigne pleaded on its behalf against foreign doctors, and obtained a favourable judgment from Parliament in 1644.

His daughter and poet, Anne de La Vigne, was very close to René Descartes. His son Claude de La Vigne was also a doctor, but, however, a mediocre man. Michel de La Vigne said of the two:

When I had my daughter, I thought I would have a son; and when I had my son, I was thinking of having a daughter!

== Publications ==
- Magistri Michaelis de La Vigne,... Orationes duæ... adversus Theophrastum Renaudot,... et omnes medicos extraneos, Lutetiae Parisiorum medicinam illicit factitantes, Paris, C. Morlot, 1644
- Diaeta Sanorum sive ars sanitatis. Paris, Gabriel Targa, 1671
