= Nicolas Jarry (calligrapher) =

French calligrapher

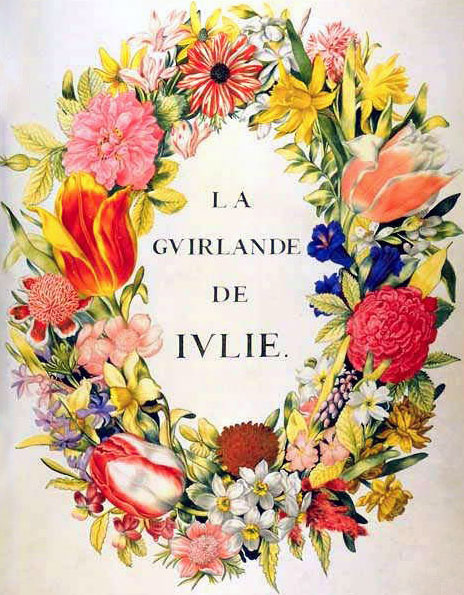
Cover of the Guirlande de Julie

Nicolas Jarry (French pronunciation: [nikɔla ʒaʁi]1620 – 1670) was a noted 17th-century French calligrapher, whose works included his renditions of the poems of the Guirlande de Julie by Charles de Sainte-Maure, duc de Montausier.

== Sources ==
- Laurent Guillo, Pierre I Ballard et Robert III Ballard, imprimeurs du roy pour la musique (1599-1673), Sprimont et Versailles: 2003. 2 vols: see vol. 1, pp. 54–55
- Emmanuel Bénézit, Dictionnaire des Peintres, 1976
- Musiciens de Paris 1535-1792 d'après le Fichier Laborde. Publié par Yolande de Brossard. Paris: Picard, 1965
- Françoise Gaussen, "Actes d'état-civil de musiciens français: 1651-1681", in Recherches sur la musique française classique 1 (1960), pp. 153–203.
- Comte Amédée de Caix de Saint-Amour, "Un document concernant Nicolas Jarry, célèbre calligraphe du XVII siècle", in Bulletin de la Société de l'histoire de Paris et l'Île-de-France 44 (1917), pp. 41–43
- Baron Roger Portalis, "Nicolas Jarry et la calligraphie au XVII siècle", in Bulletin du bibliophile, 1896 and 1897
- John William Bradley, A dictionary of miniaturists, illuminators, calligraphers and copyists, with references to their works and notices of their patrons, 1889, 3 vols: see vol. 2, pp. 143–148
