= Vigne =

Vigne is a surname. Notable people with the surname include:

- Chubb Vigne (1868–1955), South African rugby union player
- Éric Vigne, French writer
- Gilles Vigne (born 1950), French swimmer
- Godfrey Vigne (1801–1863), English cricketer and traveller
- Henry Vigne (1817–1898), English cricketer
- Blessed Pierre Vigne (1670–1740), French Roman Catholic priest
- Randolph Vigne (1928–2016), South African anti-apartheid activist and member of the Liberal Party of South Africa
- Thomas Vigne (1771–1841), English cricketer

== See also ==
- Vigne Glacier, a glacier in Pakistan
