= Claude de Malleville =

French poet

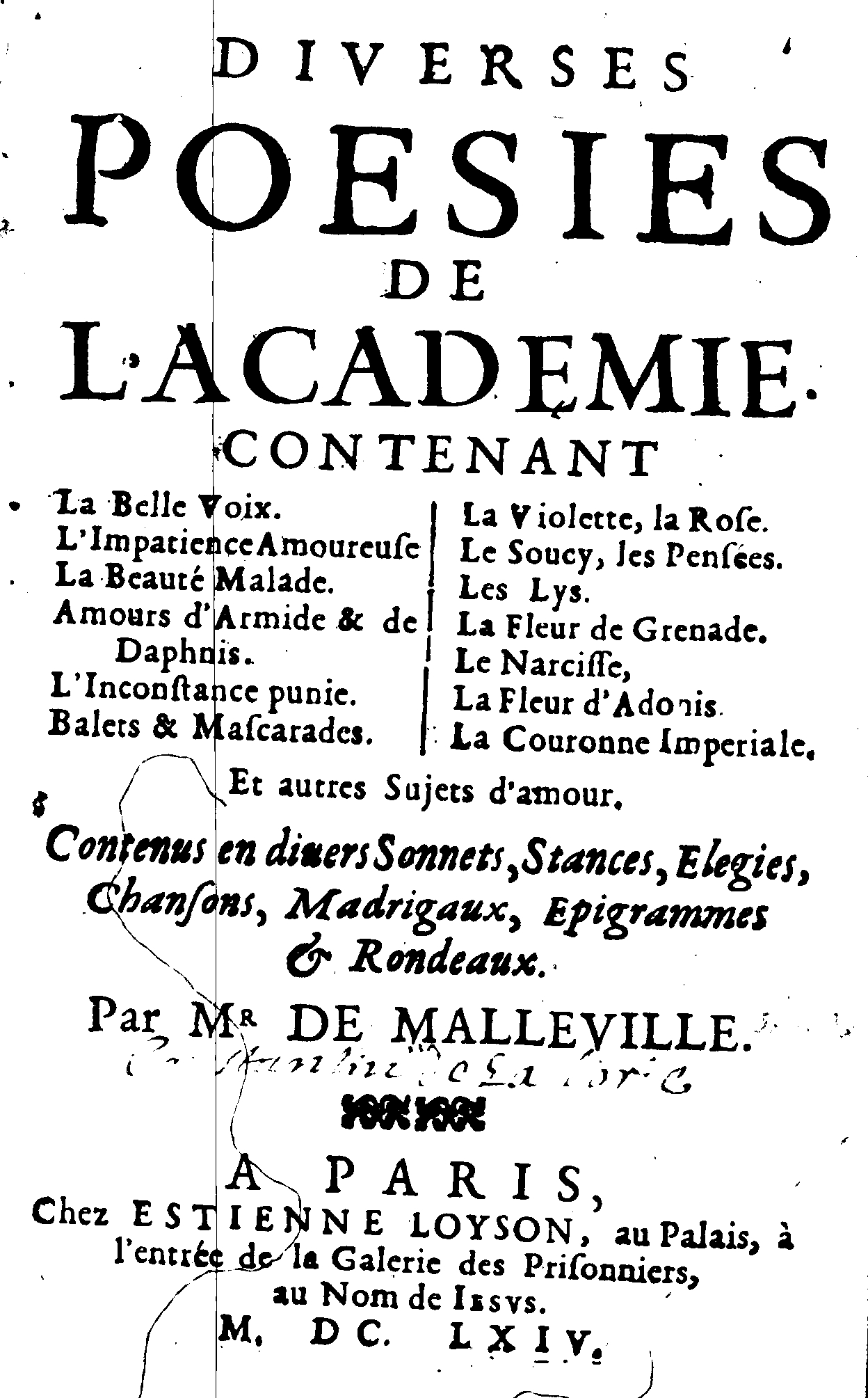
Diverses poésies de l'Académie by Claude Malleville (1664)

Claude Malleville, born in Paris probably between 1594 and 1596 and died in the same city in 1647, was a French poet. He became one of the first members of the Académie Française in 1634.

== His life ==
Knowledge about Claude Malleville's life was for a long time reduced to the following notice by his contemporary Paul Pellisson:

Claude de Malleville was from Paris. His father had been an officer in the household of Retz, and his mother was of good family in Paris. He studied very well in college, and had a very delicate mind. He was sent to learn business from a king's secretary named Potiers, who was in finance; but he did not stay there long, owing to his inclination to literature. He met Mr. Porchères-Laugiers, who gave him to the Marshal de Bassompierre. He was with this lord for a long time, as secretary, but with only very little employment there, and as he had a lot of ambition, he was bored by it, and begged him to agree that he should leave him to enter the service of Cardinal de Bérulle, who was then in favour. But having done no better business there, he returned to his first master, to whom he rendered many services in his prison, and who having been released from it, and having been reinstated in his office of colonel of the Swiss Guard, gave him the secretariat attached to it. This job earned him a lot, and in a short time he earned 20 000 écus. He used part of it to obtain a post of king's secretary: on which there are in his works a few verses to M. the Chancellor. He had accompanied M. de Bassompierre on his trip to England; but not in that of Switzerland. He died aged just over fifty. He was short, very slender; his hair was black, and his eyes too, which he had rather weak. What was most esteemed in him was his wit, and his genius for verse. There is a volume of his Poems, printed after his death, which all have wit, fire, a beautiful turn of verse, a great deal of delicacy and sweetness, and show great fecundity; but of which there are few, it seems to me, well polished.

This succinct and partly erroneous notice must now be replaced by a work by Maurice Cauchie, published in 1923, and corrected on certain points by R. Ortali.

== The works ==
In his youth, Malleville was a member of the cenacle of the fr:Illustres Bergers, a circle of Catholic ronsardian poets and scholars, in which he was identified with Damon.

A member of the circles of Valentin Conrart and of Marie de Gournay, a regular at the Hôtel de Rambouillet, Malleville contributed a dozen poems to the Guirlande de Julie. His most famous sonnet, La Belle Matineuse, was composed on the occasion of a poetic joust with Vincent Voiture on a theme that goes back to the Latin poet Catullus and was taken up successively by Clément Marot, Joachim du Bellay, Francis I of France, Annibale Caro and François Tristan l'Hermite. Like other French poets of the time, he wrote sonnets on the themes of La Belle More, La Belle Gueuse and La Belle Baigneuse, borrowed from Giambattista Marino. The name of Malleville has long been known to the general educated public only by this appreciation of Nicolas Boileau: "A sonnet without faults alone is worth a long poem. / But in vain a thousand authors think they can do it; / And that happy phoenix is yet to be found. / Barely in Gombaut, Maynard and Malleville, / Can you admire two or three out of a thousand. »

In addition to his sonnets imitated from the Italian mentioned above (and of which he also treats certain themes in Stances), praised poems of Malleville are his elegy on the death of the Princess of Conti, lover of Bassompierre and perhaps secretly married to him, his paraphrase of Psalm XXX Exaltabo Te Domine and a heroic priapaea on the famous Ethiopian Zaga Christ, which, according to several critics, is his masterpiece.

== Publications ==
- L'Almerinde (1646) and La Stratonice (1649). Translated from the Italian of Luca Assarino by Pierre d'Audiguier le jeune et Claude de Malleville.
- Poésies du sieur de Malleville (1649), online.
- Diverses poésies de l'Académie. Divers sonnets, stances, élégies, chansons, madrigaux, épigrammes & rondeaux (1664), online.
- Mémoires du maréchal de Bassompierre, contenans l'histoire de sa vie (4 volumes, 1723).
- Œuvres poétiques, critical edition by Raymond Ortali, Didier, Paris, 1976.
