= Susenyos I =

Emperor of Ethiopia from 1606 to 1632

Susenyos I ቀዳማዊ ዐፄ ሱስንዮስ
- Negusa Nagast
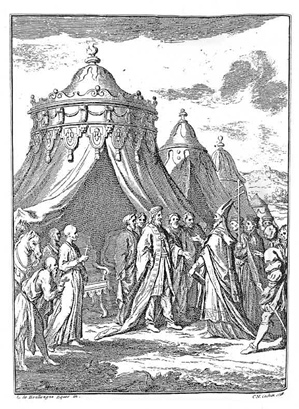
- Contemporary portrait of King Susenyos I of Ethiopia receiving the Latin Patriarch Afonso Mendes

Emperor of Ethiopia
- Reign: 1607–1632
- Coronation: 18 March 1608
- Predecessor: Yaqob
- Successor: Fasilides
- Born: 1571, 1572, or 1575; Gojjam, Ethiopian Empire
- Died: 17 September 1632 (aged 59–60); Dangaz, Ethiopian Empire
- Burial: Church of Ganata Iyasus, Azazo
- Consort: Waled Sa'ala
- Issue: Kanafra Krestos; Fasilides; Claudius; Markos; Wangelawit; Malakotawit; Galilawit
Names
- Sisinios, Sisinnius, Socinios, Sociniós, Socinius, Sousnyos Susənyos, Susénius, Susenyos, Sūsĕnyōs, Susinyos, Susneus or Susneyos
Regnal name
- Seltan Sagad and Malak Sagad III
- Dynasty: House of Solomon
- Father: Abeto Fasil
- Mother: Hamalmal Warq
- Religion: Ethiopian Orthodox (1571–1622); Roman Catholic (1622–1632)

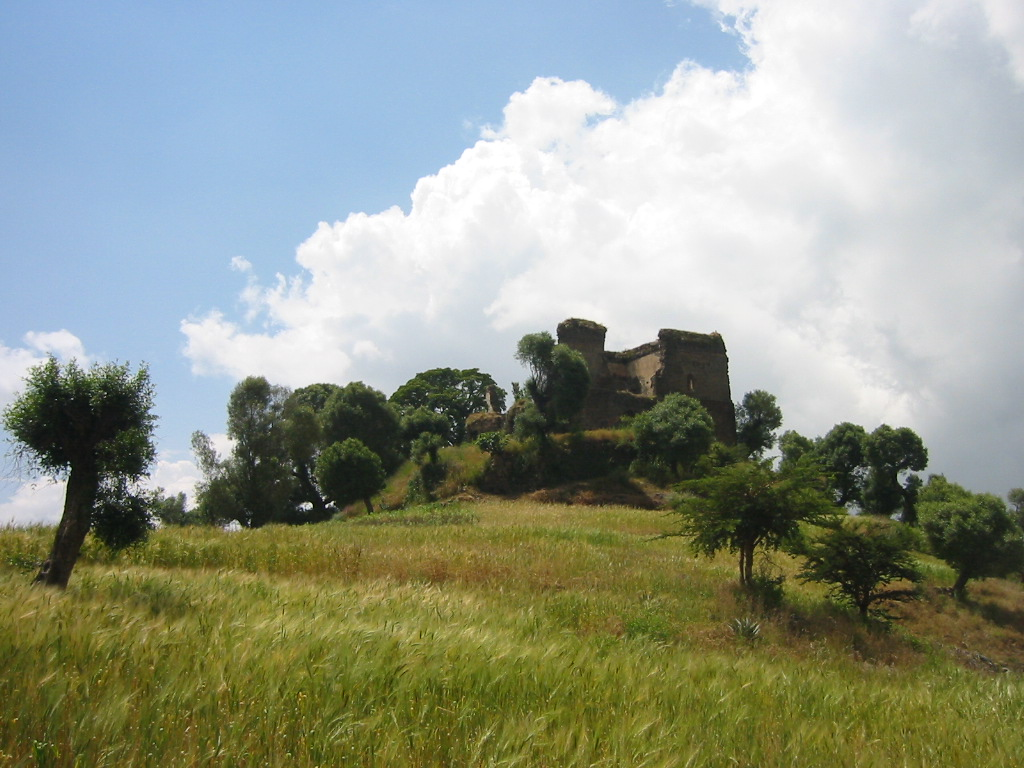
Ruins of Susenyos Palace

Susenyos I (Ge'ez: ሱስንዮስ Sūsinyōs; c. 1571–1575 (Note: Other sources give differing year of birth such as 1571, 1572 1575) – 17 September 1632), also known as Susenyos the Catholic, was Emperor of Ethiopia from 1607 to 1632, and a member of the Solomonic dynasty. His throne names were Seltan Sagad and Malak Sagad III. (Note: Susenyos had the throne names Seltān Sagad and Malak Sagad, each having practically the same meaning.)

He was the son of Abeto Fasil, as well as the grandson of Abeto Yakob and the great-grandson of Dawit II. As a result, while some authorities list Susenyos as a member of the Solomonic dynasty, others consider him—rather than his son, Fasilides—as the founder of the Gondar line of the dynasty (which is, however, ultimately a subset of the Solomonic dynasty).

The life of Susenyos is known through his chronicle, written by several official writers (sehafe te’ezaz). The Jesuits, who were closely associated with Susenyos’s reign, also left numerous documents on their mission in Ethiopia.

Manuel de Almeida, a Portuguese Jesuit who lived in Ethiopia during Susenyos reign, described the emperor as "tall with the features of a man of quality, large handsome eyes, and an ample and well groomed beard. He wore a tunic of crimson velvet down to the knee, breeches of the Moorish style, a sash or girdle of many large pieces of fine gold, and an outer coat of damask of the same colour, like a capelhar."

The Spanish Jesuit, Pedro Paez described him as "tall and well-proportioned, with large eyes, a straight nose and thin lips, a joyful expression and dark complexion. He is very good-natured and has excellent qualities; he is very prudent, a great and courageous captain, cunning and experienced in matters of war, because he has spent most of his life in it, and he has made it his office to govern an army. He is very generous, affable and a man who has the word of a king, because no fault can ever be found in what he says or promises, which is something rare in Ethiopia."

== Ancestry ==
Of Amhara descent, Susenyos was born to Hamalmal Warq, the daughter from a provincial chief from the noble family of Shime (Note: Shime is located in modern day South Gondar Zone, near Nefas Mewcha then part of Begemder.), and Abeto Fasil the son of Prince Abeto Yaeqob, who in turn was the son of King Dawit II (r. 1507–1540).

Susenyos was the youngest of his mother's five sons. His brothers Se'ela Krestos, Make'd Krestos, Yamana Krestos and Afa Krestos held the most important posts during his reign.

== Early life ==
As a boy, a group of marauding Oromos captured him and killed his father Abeto Fasil and a number of others. Susenyos resided among the Oromos for over two years where he learned their language and customs. He was rescued by the Dejazmach Asbo in 1585 in a military campaign against the Oromos led by Emperor Sarsa Dengel, his uncle.

Upon his rescue, Susenyos was entrusted to the care of Dowager Empress (Queen mother) Admas Mogasa, who supervised his early education. The Queen mother was the mother of Sarsa Dengel and widow of Emperor Menas, and great-aunt of Susenyos. So that he could support himself, the queen mother, returned to him the lands (gult) previously held by his father in Gojjam.

=== Struggle for the throne ===
After the death of Emperor Sarsa Dengel, and the accession of his very young son Yaqob on the throne, Queen regent Maryam Sena and her sons-in-law Ras Atnatewos (Note: Atnatewos is also spelled in different sources as Atenatewos, Athanasius) the governor of Gojjam and Keflawahd (Note: Keflawahd is also spelled in different sources as Kəfəlä Wahəd) the governor of Tigray and other chief nobles among them Ras Za Selasse (Note: Za Selasse is also spelled in various sources as Za-Selasse and Zä Śəllase) governor of Dembiya and Wogera perceived older princes such as Susenyos as potential successors, and thus as legitimate threat to their own ambitions to exercise power during Yaqob's minority. Susenyos and other would be claimants were forced into exile. As a wandering shifta prince, Susenyos with a few faithful followers took refuge in Gojjam and Shewa, and led a guerrilla war from Walaqa. His control over this territory was strengthened earlier through his marriage, around 1595, to Wald Saala, a princess from the ancient Christian family of the rulers of Walaqa and Mahrabete. Susenyos spent most of this period as shifta in his father's province of Gojjam fighting off raids by Oromos. When Susenyos went to Walaqa, he helped the governor against the Oromo who were invading the province at the time. However, Susenyos soon abandoned the governor and joined the Oromo in their attack on the province. Once the Oromo accepted him Susenyos took control of Walaqa. From the latter province he went to Debra Selalo, where he impressed some Oromo bands who soon flocked to his standard. With his new Oromo followers, he pillaged Christian peasants on mountain tops in Shewa and returned to Walaqa, where he mercilessly looted a large commercial caravan. Whenever and wherever the Christian peasants revolted against him he attacked them with his Oromo bands and he settled them in the territory of the peasants.

His one-time ally and cousin, Emperor Za Dengel, led a large army against Susenyos and his Oromo supporters in Walaqa. Susenyos fled with his Oromo warriors and Za-Dengel had to be content with the large amounts of loot he took from them. Once the Emperor returned to Gojjam, Susenyos followed him. While crossing the Abay Susenyos met the Liban Oromo from among whom about 400 cavalry joined him on his march on Gojjam. After the death of Emperor Za Dengel on 13 December 1604, Susenyos was crowned Emperor on 14 December 1604 by a faction led by Ras Atnatewos, however Za Selasse's faction restored his cousin Yaqob to the throne.

== Reign ==
Susenyos became Emperor following the defeat of first Za Selasse, then on 10 March 1607 Yaqob at the Battle of Gol in southern Gojjam. After his defeat, Za Sellase became a supporter of Susenyos, but fell out with Susenyos early in his reign, and was imprisoned on an amba in Guzamn. After a year, Za Selassie managed to escape and lived as an outlaw or shifta for a year until he was killed by a peasant, who sent his head to the Emperor. In his early reign he was defeated by Hadiya rebels led by Sidi Mohammed at the Battle of Hadiya.

In 1608, a rebel appeared near Debre Bizen. Because the body of Yaqob had never been found after the Battle of Gol, there had been some doubt that the previous Emperor was truly dead, and a pretender announced that he was the dead Emperor Yaqob. The pretender managed to disguise the fact he did not resemble Yaqob by keeping part of his face covered, claiming that he had suffered grievous wounds to his teeth and face from the battle. The governor of Tigray, Sela Krestos, eventually heard of the revolt, and not trusting the loyalty of a general levy of troops struck against the rebel with his own household and the descendants of the Portuguese soldiers who had followed Cristóvão da Gama (son of the legendary Portuguese explorer Vasco da Gama) into Ethiopia. Despite defeating the rebels thrice, the pretender managed to escape each battle to hide in the mountains of Hamasien.

Meanwhile, Emperor Susenyos was preoccupied with raiding parties of the Oromo. An initial encounter with the Marawa Oromo near the upper course of the Reb River ended in a defeat for the Ethiopian advance guards; Susenyos rallied his men and made an attack which scattered the Oromo. The Marawa allied with other Oromo, and the united force entered Begemder to avenge their defeat. Upon hearing of this, the Emperor responded by summoning his son-in-law Qegnazmach Julius and Kifla Krestos to join him with their troops, and defeated the raiders at Ebenat on 17 January 1608. According to James Bruce, the Royal Chronicle of Susenyos reports 12,000 Oromo were killed while only 400 on the Emperor's side were lost. With the Oromo threat dealt with, Susenyos now could turn his attention to Yaqob the pretender; he marched to Axum by way of the Lamalmo and Waldebba, where he was formally crowned Emperor 18 March 1608, in a ceremony described by João Gabriel, the captain of the Portuguese in Ethiopia. Despite this act legitimizing his rule, Susenyos had no luck capturing the pretender, and was forced to leave the task to his servant Amsala Krestos. Amsala Krestos induced two brothers who had joined the rebellion to assassinate Yaqob the pretender, who then sent the dead man's head to Susenyos. Without a scarf obscuring his features, writes Bruce, "it now appeared, that he had neither scars in his face, broken jaw, nor loss of teeth; but the covering was intending only to conceal the little resemblance he bore to king Jacob, slain, as we said before, at the battle of Lebart."

=== Sennar War ===
Abd al Qadir II of Sennar acknowledged Susenyos' authority in 1606, receiving a negarit drum, sign of vassalage, and giving a trained falcon. Similarly, his brother and successor Adlan I maintained the relationship, giving a number of fine horses as a present. Badi I of Sennar, son of Abd al-Qadir II and successor of Adlan I, however, outraged by the shelter given in Chilga to his father by the Ethiopians, severed these ties, sending as an insult two lame horses and an army led by the Nail Weld Ageeb from Atbara, to pillage the border areas.

The hostilities between the two kingdoms increased when the governor of the Mazaga, Aleko, who was a servant of Emperor Susenyos, fled to Sennar with a number of the Emperor's horses and kettledrums. Susenyos complained of this to Badi, who refused to reply; further insulting him.

In 1615, Susenyos, this time allied with the Nail Weld Ageeb, re-conquered and annexed the Kingdom of Fazughli into the Ethiopian Empire, on the Sennar Sultanate borderlands. The emperor sent priests to renew the Orthodox Christianity of the province, though the missionaries seem to have become mired in doctrinal disputes, and their accomplishments were limited. In 1618–1619, the war continued, this time the Emperor sent three of his vassals to campaign against Sennar. Welde Hawaryat, Melca Chrestos and the governor of Tigray, Ras Tekle Giyorgis, led a three-pronged assault on the border from their respective provinces. Welde Hawaryat finally conquered and sacked the town of Atbara on the Nile after a 19-day march. Susenyos finally sent Bahr Negus Gebre Mariam to attack Mandara, whose queen controlled a strategic caravan road from Suakin. Bahir Negash was successful in capturing Queen Fatima, who was brought back to Susenyos palace in Danqaz, and renewed submission to the Empire.

According to his Royal Chronicle, Susenyos hence made his power felt along his western frontier from Fazogli, north to Suakin.

=== Catholicism ===
Susenyos' reign is perhaps best known as the brief period in Ethiopian history when Catholic Christianity became the official religion. Some Ethiopians consider the fact that the Emperor proclaimed the Catholic Church as the official state religion as against his title of defender of the faith, thus de facto forfeiting his title and making the proclamation illegitimate. By that reasoning, some Ethiopians see the Catholic Church as never formally having been recognized as a state religion. The Emperor became interested in Catholicism, in part due to Pedro Páez's persuasion, but also in hope for military help from Portugal and Spain (in union at the time of Susenyos' reign). Some decades earlier, in 1541, Cristóvão da Gama had led a military expedition to save the Ethiopian emperor Gelawdewos from the onslaught of Ahmad ibn Ibrahim, a Muslim Imam who almost destroyed the existence of the Ethiopian state. Susenyos hoped to receive a new contingent of well-armed European soldiers, this time against the Oromo, who were ravaging his kingdom, and to help with the constant rebellions. Two letters of this diplomatic effort survive, which he entrusted to Páez to send to Europe: the one to the King of Portugal is dated 10 December 1607, while the other is to the Pope and dated 14 October of the same year; neither mention his conversion, but both ask for soldiers. He showed the Jesuit missionaries his favor by a number of land grants, most importantly those at Gorgora, located on a peninsula on the northern shore of Lake Tana.

In 1613, Susenyos sent a mission heading for Madrid and Rome, led by Jesuit priest António Fernandes. The plan was to head south, in an attempt to reach Malindi, a port on the Indian Ocean in what is Kenya today, hoping to break through the effective blockade that the Ottoman conquests had created around the Ethiopian Empire by sailing all the way around the southern tip of Africa. However, they failed to reach Malindi, due to delays caused by local Christians hostile to the mission.

In addition to the strategic logic behind Susenyos's conversion, some historians point out that the Oromo crisis had undermined the legitimacy of the traditional Ethiopian social order based on feudalism and religious orthodoxy. The monk Bahrey, who wrote a treatise on the Oromo in 1593, attributed their success to the failures of feudalism which had produced too many privileged classes and not enough warriors. Susenyos in his court showed a willingness to break with social as well as tradition. Critics claimed he debased the imperial mystique after abandoning practices such as remaining behind a curtain to protect the emperor from the gaze of commoners and requiring his subjects to prostrate themselves before him. He withdrew privileges given to the sons of nobility and favored Jesuit-educated boys from outlying regions.

Susenyos at last publicly converted to Catholicism in 1622, and separated himself from all of his wives and concubines except for his first wife, Wäld Śäʿala. However, the tolerant and sensitive Pedro Páez died soon afterwards, and he was replaced by Afonso Mendes, who arrived at Massawa on 24 January 1624. E. A. Wallis Budge has stated the commonly accepted opinion of this man, as being "rigid, uncompromising, narrow-minded, and intolerant. Strife and rebellions over the enforced changes began within days of Mendes' public ceremony in 1626, where he proclaimed the primacy of Rome and condemned local practices which included Saturday Sabbath and frequent fasts. Yet a number of Ethiopians did embrace Catholicism: Richard Pankhurst reports 100,000 inhabitants of Dembiya and Wegera alone are said to have converted. The most serious response was launched by a triumvirate composed of his half-brother Yimena Krestos, a eunuch named Kefla Wahad, and his brother-in-law Julius. Susenyos avoided their first attempt to assassinate him at court, but while he was campaigning against Sennar they raised a revolt, calling to their side "all those who were friends to the Alexandrian faith". However, Susenyos had returned to Dembiya before the rebels expected, and quickly killed Julius. Yimena Krestos held out a while longer on Melka Amba in Gojjam, before Af Krestos captured him and brought him to Dankaz where Susenyos had his camp; here the Emperor's brother was tried and sentenced to banishment.

More revolts followed, some led by champions of the traditional Ethiopian Church. One revolt which resisted all of Susenyos' efforts to put down was by the Agaw in Lasta. Their first leader was Melka Krestos, a distant member of the Solomonic dynasty, whom the Agaw had sued to be their leader. Susenyos' first campaign against them, which began in February 1629 with raising an army of 30,000 men in Gojjam, was defeated and his son-in-law Gebre Krestos slain. While Melka Krestos' master of horse was slain along with 4000 men not long after while pillaging Semien Gonder, at the same time the men of Lasta made a successful raid out of their mountains into Susenyos' territory. When he attempted a second expedition against the rebels in Lasta, Susenyos found his men's morale so low that he was forced to allow them to observe one of the traditional Wednesday fasts—which brought an immediate reproach from the Catholic Patriarch. Although Susenyos eloquently defended himself, Bruce notes that "from this time, it plainly appears, that Socinios began to entertain ideas, at least of the church discipline and government, very opposite to those he had when he first embraced the Romish religion." Despite this concession to his troops, and despite the fact they reached Melka Krestos' headquarters, his forces fell to an ambush and Susenyos was forced to return to Dankaz with nothing to show for his effort.

Susenyos attempted one more campaign against the rebels, only to find his men mutinous. They saw no end to unrewarding expeditions to Lasta, and when at home confronted by the executions used to enforce Catholicism on Ethiopia. While expressing some skepticism at the matter, Bruce states the Royal Chronicle reports his son told the troops that if they were victorious in Lasta, the Emperor would restore the traditional Ethiopian practices. However, as they marched behind Susenyos to Lasta, his scouts reported that Melka Krestos had descended from Lasta with 25,000 men, and were at hand. On 26 July 1631 the armies clashed; 8,000 of the rebels were dead and Melka Krestos had fled the field. Upon viewing the field of battle, Susenyos' son Fasilides is reported to have said,

These men, whom you see slaughtered on the ground, were neither Pagans nor Mahometans, at whose death we should rejoice—they were Christians, lately your subjects and your countrymen, some of them your relations. This is not victory, which is gained over ourselves. In killing these, you drive the sword into your own entrails. How many men have you slaughtered? How many more have you to kill? We have become a proverb, even among the Pagans and Moors, for carrying on this war, and apostatizing, as they say, from the faith of our ancestors.

Less than a year afterwards, on 14 June 1632 Susenyos made a declaration that those who would follow the Catholic faith were allowed to do so, but no one would be forced to do so any further. At this point, all Patriarch Mendes could do in response was to confirm that this was, indeed, the actual will of the Emperor, his protector. Catholic Ethiopia had come to an end.

== Succession ==
In 1630, after years of rebellion, Sarsa Krestos, Viceroy of Begemder, proclaimed Susenyos' son, Fasilides, as emperor; Sarsa Krestos was promptly captured and hanged. Despite this, father and son stayed on good terms. After announcing his act of toleration, Susenyos abdicated in favor of Fasilides. He was buried at the church of Genneta Iyasus.

== Family ==
=== Spouse ===
Susenyos had one official marriage, with Wald Saala, a princess from the ancient Christian family of the rulers of Walaqa and Mahrabete.

=== Descendants ===
Despite his marriage to Wald Saala, the monarch sired over twenty sons (who were all put to death by Fasilides) and several daughters by several concubines. Seven of his descendants are mentioned by name in the sources.

- Kanafra Krestos (born before 1602) was Susenyos's eldest son by a concubine. He died young in 1615/1616, many years before his father.
- Fasilides was the successor to Susenyos's throne. He was the second son of Susenyos and the eldest by Wald Saala. He reigned as Emperor for over thirty five year.
- Gelawdewos was his third son. He was the governor of Begemder. In 1640, he was first imprisoned at house arrest then transferred to Wehni after rebelling against his brother Fasilides. He would have 2 sons and 1 daughter, when his daughter died at childbirth he was enraged and had an argument with his brother Fasilides where he exposed his plans uprising against his brother. His future generations that continued governing Begemder until the Zemene Mesfanit where their power was reduced, his later descendant Ato Abenazer Aberra living a modest private life in Maida Vale, London.
- Markos was his fourth son, Markos died young before Susenyos in 1626.
- Wangelawit was Susenyos's eldest daughter. She was married several times, her first marriage was dissolved and she was betrothed to the Bela Krestos, one of her father's retainers. Her third marriage was with nobleman Takla Giyorgis, who was executed in 1628. Wangelawit died in 1652, leaving behind her descendants.
- Malakotawit was his second daughter. She was the wife Ras Yolyos, once an influential retainer turned rebel. Died leaving behind her descendants.
- Galilawit was his third daughter. She was married to Takla Giyorgis (who was at one point also married to her older sister Wangelawit). Died with no children.

== Notes ==
Regnal titles
Preceded by Yaqob	Emperor of Ethiopia; 1606–1632	Succeeded by Fasilides
