= Jean Desmarets =

French writer and dramatist

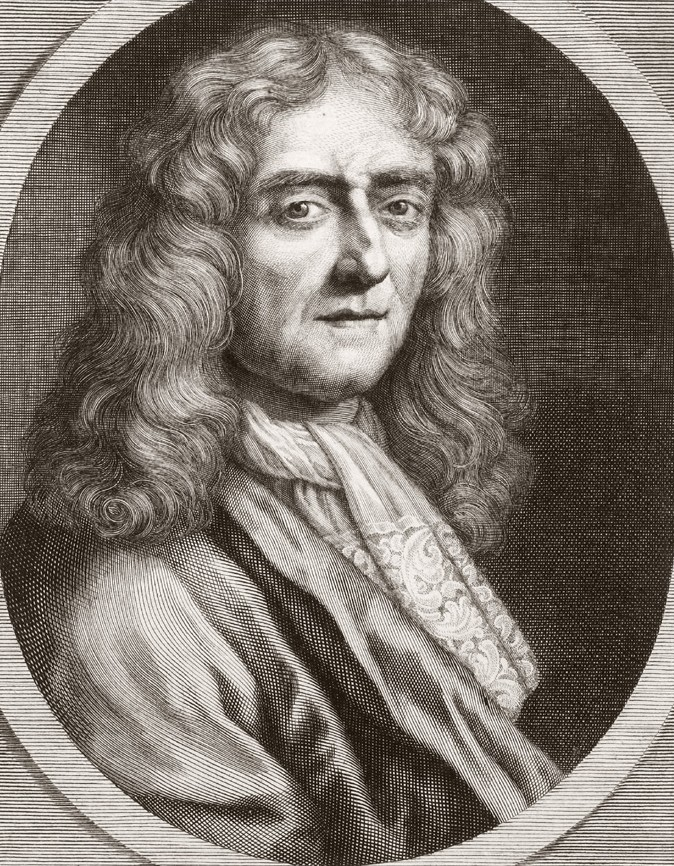
Jean Desmarets de Saint-Sorlin.

Jean Desmarets, Sieur de Saint-Sorlin (French pronunciation: [ʒɑ̃ demaʁɛ]; 1595 – 28 October 1676) was a French writer and dramatist. He was a founding member, and the first to occupy seat 4 of the Académie française in 1634.

== Biography ==
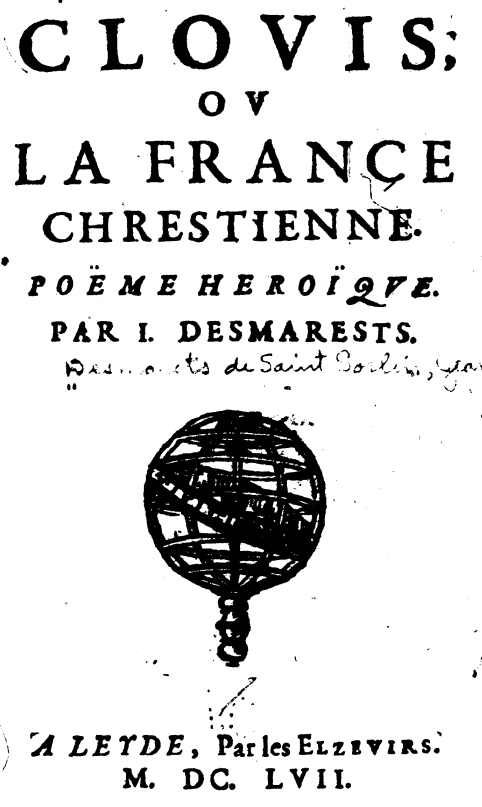
Clovis ou la France chrétienne edition dating from 1657 printed in Leiden by the Elzevirs.

Born in Paris, Desmarets was introduced to Cardinal Richelieu, and became one of the band of writers who carried out the cardinal's literary ideas when he was about thirty years old. His inclination, however, was to writing novels, and the success of his romance L'Ariane in 1632 led to his formal admission to a circle of writers that met at the house of Valentin Conrart. When this circle later developed into the Académie française, Desmarets became its first chancellor. He was related to Marie Dupré.

His success led to official preferment, and he was made conseiller du roi, contrôleur-général de l'extraordinaire des guerres, and secretary-general of the fleet of the Levant.

== Works ==
It was at Richelieu's request that he began to write for the theatre. In this genre he produced a comedy long regarded as a masterpiece, Les Visionnaires (1637), where, slightly disguised, real personages such as Madeleine de Sablé, la marquise de Rambouillet et Madame de Chavigny are staged; a prose-tragedy, Erigone (1638); and Scipion (1639), a tragedy in verse.

His long epic Clovis (1657) is noteworthy because Desmarets rejected the traditional pagan background, and maintained that Christian imagery should supplant it. With this standpoint he contributed several works in defence of the moderns in the famous quarrel between the Ancients and Moderns.

In his later years Desmarets devoted himself chiefly to producing a number of religious poems, of which the best known is perhaps his verse translation of the Office de la Vierge (1645). He was an outspoken opponent of the Jansenists, against whom he wrote a Réponse à l'insolente apologie de Port-Royal (1666). He died in Paris on 28 October 1676.

== See also ==
- Guirlande de Julie
