= André Dacier =

French scholar (1651–1722)

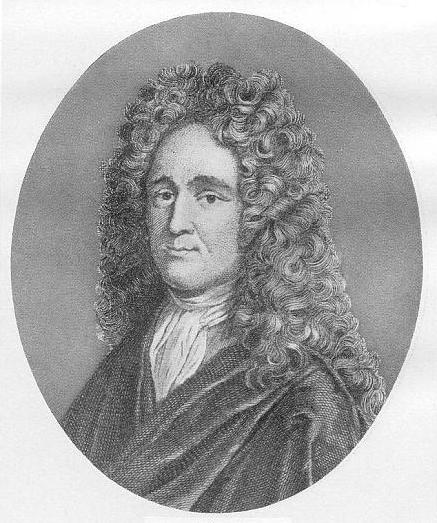
- Born: 1645; Castres, Languedoc, France
- Died: 18 September 1722 (aged 76–77); Paris, France
- Occupations: Classical scholar and editor of texts
- Spouse: Anne Dacier

André Dacier (French pronunciation: [ɑ̃dʁe dasje]; Latin: Andreas Dacerius; 6 April 1651 – 18 September 1722) was a French classical scholar and editor of texts. He began his career with an edition and commentary of Festus's De verborum significatione, and was the first to produce a "readable" text of the 20-book work. His wife was the influential classical scholar and translator, Anne Dacier.

== Life and career ==
Dacier was born at Castres in upper Languedoc. His father, a Protestant lawyer, sent him first to the Academy of Puy Laurens, and afterwards to the Academy of Saumur to study under Tanneguy Le Fèvre here he converted to Catholicism and remained a devout Catholic for the rest of his life. On Lefebvre's death in 1672, Dacier moved to Paris, and was appointed an editors of the Delphin Classics series. In 1683 he married Anne Lefèvre, the daughter of his old tutor. Better known by her married name of Madame Dacier, her work as a classicist has been acknowledged by encyclopedia editors to be far superior to his.

In 1695 he was elected to the Academy of Inscriptions, and also to the Académie française; not long after this, as payment for his share in the medallic history of the king's reign, he was appointed keeper of the library of the Louvre. He died two years after his wife.

=== Work ===
The most important of Dacier's works were his editions of Pompeius Festus and Verrius Flaccus, and his translations of Horace (with notes), Aristotle's Poetics, the Electra and Oedipus the King of Sophocles; Epictetus, Hippocrates and Plutarch's Lives.

Dacier and his wife Anne together translated Meditations by Marcus Aurelius into French in 1690–91, as well as writing an extensive commentary on the work.

In editing Festus, Dacier worked from the proposals of Joseph Scaliger, who provided notes and additions. His stated goal was to produce a "clear and educationally useful text." Addressing his work to the Dauphin (in usum Delphini), at that time Louis, he was more interested in the realia of Roman law, treaties, and the foundations of power than in the literary quality of the text or its lack thereof. Dacier's work on Festus was first published in Paris, 1681, with subsequent editions in 1692, 1699, and 1700.
