= Ad usum Delphini =

1674–1830 series of annotated Latin classics

The Delphin Classics or Ad usum Delphini was a series of annotated editions of the Latin classics, intended to be comprehensive, which was originally created in the 17th century.

The first volumes were created in the 1670s for Louis, le Grand Dauphin, heir of Louis XIV (“Delphini” is the Latinization (genitive) of Dauphin), and were written entirely in Latin. Thirty-nine scholars contributed to the series, which was edited by Pierre Huet with assistance from several co-editors, including Jacques-Bénigne Bossuet and Anne Dacier. The main features included the main Latin texts; a paraphrase in the margins or below in simpler Latin prose (an ordo verborum); extended notes on specific words and lines, mainly about history, myth, geography, or natural sciences; and indices. One useful pedagogical feature of this series is that it keeps students reading and working in the target language (Latin).

The original volumes each had an engraving of Arion and a dolphin, accompanied by the inscription in usum serenissimi Delphini (for the use of the most serene Dauphin). The collection includes 64 volumes published from 1670 to 1698.

Beginning in 1819, a different series of Latin classics was published in England under the name Valpy's Delphin Classics by Abraham John Valpy. That series was edited by George Dyer, who divided up the works of the same authors into 143 volumes. This series mainly reprinted the commentary of the original Ad usum Delphini series, with updated texts and bibliographies from editions published in the intervening century. Both series were popular in Europe and the Americas. The first American edition was published in Philadelphia in 1804 while one European edition was published in Bassan as late as 1844.

Editors of the Ad usum Delphini consciously censored classical works, deleting from the main texts passages they deemed obscene. The expression Ad usum Delphini is therefore sometimes used to refer to other texts which were expurgated because they contained passages considered inappropriate for the target audience (such as the youth).

== Publishing history ==
(Taken from Volpilhac-Auger p. 214.)

Author	Editor	Date and place of publication, Number of volumes	Link to online edition
Sallustius	Daniel Crispin	Paris, 1674	at Google Books
Phaedrus	Pierre Danet	Paris, 1675	at Google Books another
Florus	Anne Lefèvre	Paris, 1674	at Google Books
Terentius	Nicolas le Camus	Paris, 1675	at Google Books
Cornelius Nepos	Nicolas Courtin	Paris, 1675	at Google Books
Velleius Paterculus	Robert Riguez, S. J.	Paris, 1675	at Google Books
Panegyrici Veteres	Jacques de la Beaune, S. J.	Paris, 1676	at Google Books
Justinius	Pierre Joseph Cantel, S. J.	Paris, 1676	at Google Books
Claudianus	Guillaume Pyrrhon (ou Pyron)	Paris, 1677	at Google Books
Julius Caesar	Jean Goduin, professeur à Paris	Paris, 1678	at Google Books
Quintus Curtius	Michel le Tellier, S. J.	Paris, 1678	at Google Books
Manilius	Michel La Faye (ou Dufay); Pierre Daniel Huet, Remarques sur Manilius, et Julius Caesar Scaliger, Notes	Paris, 1679	at Google Books
Plautus	Jacques de l'Ouvre	Paris, 1679, 2 vol.	at Google Books
Titus Livius	Jean Douiat	Paris, 1679,6 vol.	at Google Books
Valerius Maximus	Pierre Joseph Cantel, S. J.	Paris, 1679	at Google Books
Boethius	Pierre Cally, professeur à Caen	Paris, 1680	at Google Books
Dictys Cretensis et Dares de Phrygie	Anne Dacier, fille de Tanneguy Lefebvre	Paris, 1680	at Google Books
Lucretius	Michel La Faye (ou Dufav)	Paris, 1680	at Google Books
Martialis	Vincent Colesson, professeur de droit	Paris, 1680	at Google Books
Aulus Gellius	Jacques Proust, S. J.	Paris, 1681	at Google Books
Aurelius Victor	Anne Dacier, fille de Tanneguy Lefebvre	Paris, 1681	at Google Books
Sextus Pompeius Festus et Verrius Flaccus	André Dacier	Paris, 1681	at Google Books
Cicero, Omnes qui ad artem oratoriam pertinent libri	Jacques Proust, S. J.	Paris, 1682,2 vol.	at Google Books
Tacitus	Julien Pichon	Paris, 1682,4 vol.	at Google Books
Vergilius	Charles de la Rue, S. J.	Paris, 1675 Paris, 1682	at Google Books
Eutropius	Anne Dacier, fille de Tanneguy Lefebvre	Paris, 1683	at Google Books
Cicero, Orationes	Charles de Mérouville, S. J.	Paris, 1684, 3 vol.	at Google Books
Juvenalis et Persius	Louis Desprez	Paris, 1684	at Google Books
Suetonius	Augustin Babelon	Paris, 1684	at Google Books
Catullus, Tibullus et Propertius	Philippe Dubois	Paris, 1685,2 vol.	at Google Books
Cicero, Epistulae ad Familiares	Philibert Quartier	Paris, 1685	at Google Books
Plinius, Naturalis Historia	Jean Hardouin, S. J.	Paris, 1685,5 vol.	at Google Books
Statius	Claude Berault	Paris, 1685, 2 vol.	at Google Books
Prudentius	Etienne Chamillard, S. J.	Paris, 1687	at Google Books
Apuleius	Jules Fleury, chanoine de Chartres	Paris, 1688, 2 vol.	at Google Books
Cicero, Opera Philosophica	François L'Honoré, S. J.	Paris, 1689	at Google Books
Ovidius Naso	Daniel Crispin	Lyon, 1689,4 vol.	at Google Books
Horatius Flaccus	Louis Desprez	Paris, 1691,2 vol.	at Google Books
Plinius, Naturalis Historia	Jean Hardouin, S. J.	Paris, 1723, 3 vol. in fol. (nouv. édition)	1723 ed. at Google Books
Ausonius	Jules Fleury; Jean-Baptiste Souchay	Paris, 1730	at Google Books

== 19th century London Valpy editions ==
Author	Editor	Date and place of publication, Number of volumes	Link to online edition
Julius Caesar	Opera Omnia (Complete Works).	London, 1819 2 volumes	at Google Books
Vergilius	Opera Omnia (Complete Works).	London, 1819 9 volumes	at Google Books
Sallustus	Opera Omnia (Complete Works).	London, 1820 2 volumes	at Google Books
Claudianus	Opera Omnia (Complete Works).	London, 1821 4 volumes	at Google Books
Eutropius	Breviarium historiae Romanae (Abridgment of Roman History).	London, 1821 1 volume	at Google Books
Ovidius Naso	Opera Omnia (Complete Works).	London, 1821 10 volumes	at Google Books
Tacitus	Opera Omnia (Complete Works).	London, 1821 10 volumes	at Google Books
Catullus	Opera Omnia (Complete Works).	London, 1822 2 volumes	at Google Books
Cornelius Nepos	Vitae excellentium imperatorum. (Lives of the Excellent Commanders).	London, 1822 2 volumes	at Google Books
Florus	Epitome Rerum Romanarum (Epitome of Roman History.	London, 1822 2 volumes	at Google Books
Justinius	Historiae Philippicae (Philippic Histories).	London, 1822 2 volumes	at Google Books
Juvenalis	Opera Omnia (Complete Works).	London, 1822 2 volumes	at Google Books
Velleius Paterculus	Historia Romana (Roman History).	London, 1822 1 volume	at Google Books
Phaedrus	Fabulae Aesopiae (Fables of Aesop).	London, 1822 2 volumes	at Google Books
Propertius	Opera Omnia (Complete Works).	London, 1822 2 volumes	at Google Books
Tibullus	Opera Omnia (Complete Works).	London, 1822 1 volume	at Google Books
Ausonius	Opera Omnia (Complete Works).	London, 1823 3 volumes	at Google Books
Boethius	De Consolatione Philosophiae (The Consolation of Philosophy).	London, 1823 1 volume	at Google Books
Lucretius	De Rerum Natura Libri Sex. (Six Books on the Nature of Things).	London, 1823 4 volumes	at Google Books
Martialis	Epigrammata (Epigrams).	London, 1823 3 volumes	at Google Books
Valerius Maximus	Factorum Dictorumque Memorabilium Libri Novem (Nine Books on Memorable Deeds and Sayings).	London, 1823 3 volumes	at Google Books
Aulus Gellius	Noctes Atticae (Attic Nights).	London, 1824 4 volumes	at Google Books
Prudentius.	Opera Omnia (Complete Works).	London, 1824 3 volumes	at Google Books
Statius	Opera Omnia (Complete Works).	London, 1824 4 volumes	at Google Books
Terentius	Comoediae Sex (Six Comedies).	London, 1824 4 volumes	at Google Books
Apuleius	Opera omnia (Complete Works).	London, 1825 7 volumes	at Google Books
Quintus Curtius	De Rebus gestis Alexandri Magni libri superstites. (All the Books That Survive of the Histories of Alexander the Great of Macedon).	London, 1825 4 volumes	at Google Books
Dares de Phrygie and Dictys Cretensis	De Bello Trojano (The Trojan War).	London, 1825 1 volume	at Google Books
Horatius Flaccus	Opera Omnia (Complete Works).	London, 1825 5 volumes	at Google Books
Sextus Pompeius Festus and Verrius Flaccus	De Verborum Significatione (On the Meaning of Words).	London, 1826 3 volumes	at Google Books
Plinius	Naturalis Historiae Libri XXXVII	London, 1826 15 volumes	at Google Books
Suetonius	Opera Omnia (Complete Works).	London, 1826 3 volumes	at Google Books
Titus Livius	Historiarum Libri Qui Supersunt. (History Books Which Have Survived).	London, 1828 27 volumes	at Google Books
Manilius	Astronomicon (Astrology).	London, 1828 2 volumes	at Google Books
Panegyrici Veteres	Panegyrici Veteres (Old Panegyrics).	London, 1828 6 volumes	at Google Books
Aurelius Victor	Historia Romana (Roman History).	London, 1829 2 volumes	at Google Books
Plautus	Comoediae (Comedies).	London, 1829 5 volumes	at Google Books
Cicero	Opera (Works).	London, 1830 15 volumes	at Google Books

== Reception and influence ==
The Ad usum Delphini collection was referred to by E.T.A. Hoffmann in Lebensansichten des Katers Murr (1819).

„Sie sind, unterbrach ihn der Prinz, ein spaßhafter Mann.“ — Ganz und gar nicht, fuhr Kreisler fort, ich liebe zwar den Spaß, aber nur den schlechten, und der ist nun wieder nicht spaßhaft. Gegenwärtig wollt' ich gern nach Neapel gehen, und beim Molo einige gute Fischer- und Banditenlieder aufschreiben ad usum delphini. (English translation: "You are, the prince interrupted, a jolly man." - Not at all, Kreisler continued, I love fun, but only bad, and it's not fun again. At present I would like to go to Naples and write down some good fishermen's and bandit songs ad usum delphini at the Molo.)

The Ad usum Delphini collection was referred to by Edward Bulwer-Lytton in Devereux, Book IV (1829):

let me turn to Milord Bolingbroke, and ask him whether England can produce a scholar equal to Peter Huet, who in twenty years wrote notes to sixty-two volumes of Classics, for the sake of a prince who never read a line in one of them?" "We have some scholars," answered Bolingbroke; "but we certainly have no Huet. It is strange enough, but learning seems to me like a circle: it grows weaker the more it spreads. We now see many people capable of reading commentaries, but very few indeed capable of writing them."

Honoré de Balzac III: Ève et David, later Les souffrances de l'inventeur, (1843):

History is of two kinds--there is the official history taught in schools, a lying compilation ad usum delphini; and there is the secret history which deals with the real causes of events--a scandalous chronicle.

There is a reference to the Delphin Classics in Part I, Chapter 5 of Thomas Hardy's Jude the Obscure (1895), where young Jude, trying to educate himself by reading while delivering bread from a horse and cart,

"plunge[s] into the simpler passages from Caesar, Virgil, or Horace [. . .] The only copies he had been able to lay hands on were old Delphin editions, because they were superseded, and therefore cheap. But, bad for idle school-boys, it did so happen that they were passably good for him."
