= De analogia =

Two lost books by Julius Caesar

De analogia (full title: De analogia libri II ad M. Tullium Ciceronem, "Two Books on Analogies, [dedicated] to Marcus Tullius Cicero") is a lost book in two volumes of grammatical work on the Latin language written by Julius Caesar and dedicated to Cicero. Only a few fragments from this important work have survived. Suetonius mentions that Caesar wrote De analogia while he and his army were crossing the Alps.

== Contents ==
De Analogia denotes the adherence to grammatical rules while not changing one's diction with current demotic usage. After the composition of his Commentarii de bello Gallico Caesar felt obligated to devise certain grammatical principles in reference to his commentaries, writing that "the choice of words is the fountain-head of eloquence." Parts of this work could have also been triggered by comments in Cicero's De oratore. Cicero himself mentioned that Caesar's De Analogia had been written with the greatest accuracy.

=== Examples ===
- harēna should only be used in the singular (singular form: "sand"; plural form: "grains of sand")
- quadrīgae ("four-horse chariot") should only be used in the plural
- the variant Calypsōnem is to be used for the declension of the Latinized Greek name Calypsō
- turbonem is to be preferred over turbinem, where turbo means "storm"

In the ancient Latin dictionary De Verborum Significatu by Sextus Pompeius Festus, which was a new edition of Flaccus' homonymous work, Festus quotes a fragment of the De analogia in the discussion of the double consonant. Caesar limits the ancient, primitive Latin alphabet to eleven letters. A comparison with the parallel Varronian fragment however has shown that Caesar here only meant the ancient consonants.

== Bibliography ==
- Alessandro Garcea, ed. (2012). Caesar’s De Analogia. New York: Oxford University Press.
