= Louis Legrand (theologian) =

French Sulpician priest and theologian

Louis Legrand, S.S. (b. Lusigny-sur-Ouche, Burgundy, 12 June 1711, d. at Issy, Île-de-France, 21 July 1780) was a French Sulpician priest and theologian, and a Doctor of the Sorbonne.

== Life ==
After studying philosophy and theology at the Seminary of Saint-Sulpice, Paris, Legrand taught philosophy at Clermont, 1733–1736, and then resumed his studies in Paris, where he entered the Society of Saint-Sulpice in 1739 and obtained the licentiate in 1740. He taught theology at Cambrai, 1740–1743, was superior of the seminary in Autun, 1743–1745, and, having been recalled to Paris, received the degree of Doctor of Theology from the Sorbonne in 1746. Henceforth he remained at the Seminary of Saint-Sulpice in various employments.

Appointed director of studies in 1767 he exercised in this capacity an influence over young seminarians of France, who were preparing to take their degrees at the Sorbonne. As a Doctor of the Sorbonne he was called upon to take a prominent part in framing the decisions and censures of the theological faculty; in that intense period of opposition to Christian dogma, he was centrally involved in its defense.

== Works ==
It was Legrand who wrote the condemnation of Jean-Jacques Rousseau's Emile, or On Education (reprinted in Migne's Theologiae Cursus Completus, II, col. 1111–1248).

Legrand also drafted the censures of Marmontel's Bélisaire and Isaac-Joseph Berruyer's Histoire du Peuple de Dieu. He helped to avert a censure of Buffon's Epoques de la Nature, in consideration of the author's retraction. Legrand's moderation and kindliness gained the esteem and good will of both Buffon and Marmontel.

Most of what Legrand wrote was in collaboration. Nearly all the writings of Legrand were included by Migne in his Theologiae Cursus Completus. The most important are:

- Praelectiones Theologicae de Deo ac divinis attributis, a work by La Fosse based on Tournély's treatise, re-edited by Legrand who added about 400 pages of additional matter. Reprinted in Migne, VII.
- Tractatus de Incarnatione Verbi Divini (in Migne, IX), also based on Tournély.

Parts of Legrand's Tractatus de Ecclesia have been reproduced by Migne in his Scripturae Sacrae Cursus Completus, IV. At the time of his death, Legrand left an unfinished treatise, De Existentia Dei (Paris, 1812).
