= Jean Hardouin =

French classical scholar (1646–1729)

Reverend Jean Hardouin
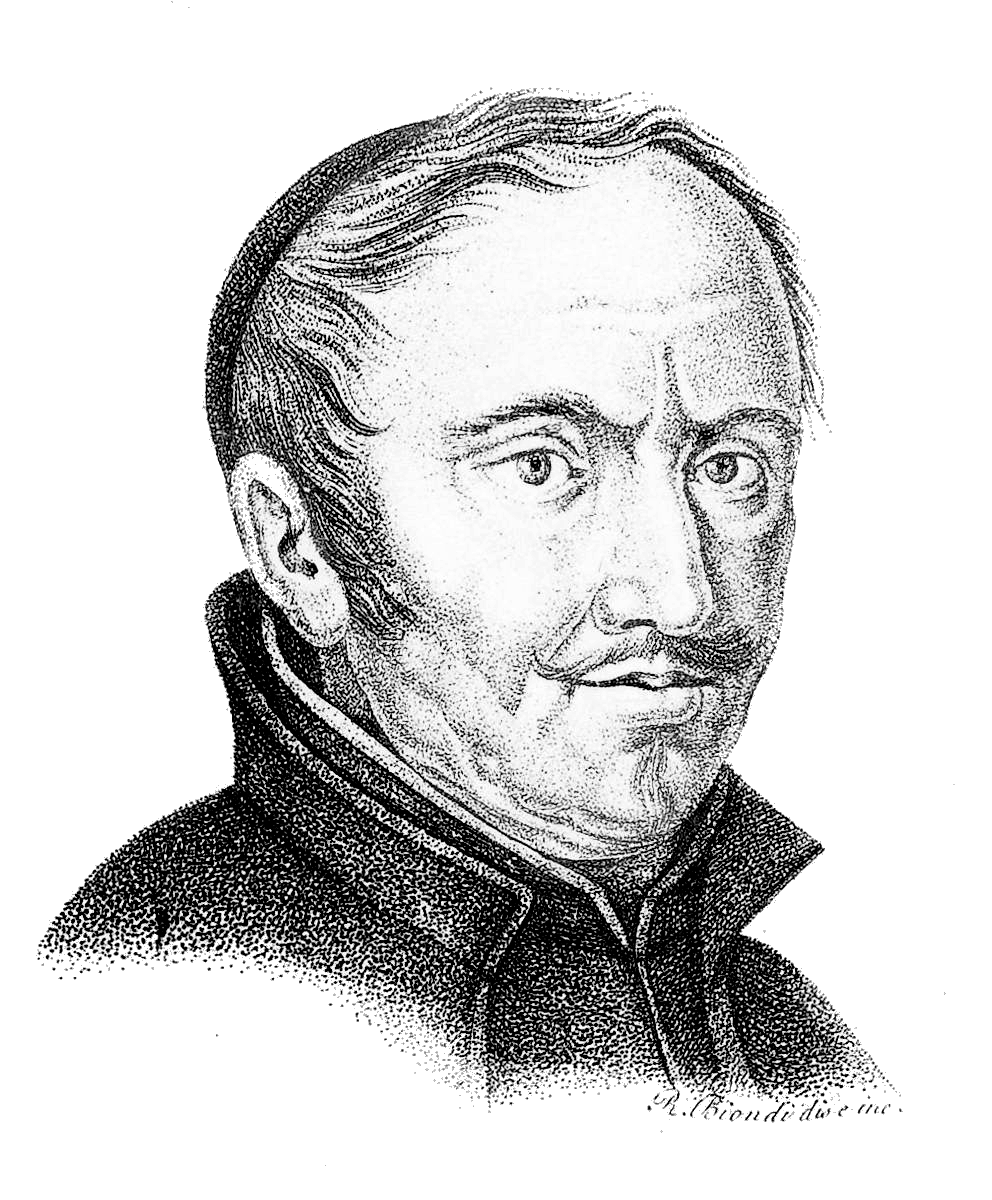
- Portrait of Jean Harduin by R. Biondi
- Born: December 23, 1646; Quimper, Kingdom of France
- Died: 3 September 1729 (aged 82); Paris, Kingdom of France
- Occupations: Catholic priest, librarian, classical scholar, historian, numismatist
- Known for: Critical editions of the works of Themistius and Pliny the Elder

Academic work
- Discipline: Classics, Chronology, Numismatics
- Institutions: Lycée Louis-le-Grand
- Influenced: Isaac-Joseph Berruyer; Anatoly Fomenko

Jean Hardouin SJ (French pronunciation: [ʒɑ̃ aʁdwɛ̃]; English: John Hardwin; Latin: Johannes Harduinus; 23 December 1646 – 3 September 1729), was a French priest and classical scholar who was well known during his lifetime for his editions of ancient authors, and for writing a history of the ecumenical councils. However, he is best remembered now as the originator of a variety of unorthodox theories, especially his opinion that a 14th century conspiracy forged practically all literature traditionally believed to have been written before that era. He also denied the genuineness of most ancient works of art, coins, and inscriptions. Hardouin's eccentric ideas led to the placement of a number of his works on the Index of Forbidden Books.

Although Hardouin has been called "pathological" and "mad", he was only an extreme example of a general critical trend of his time, following authors like Baruch Spinoza, Thomas Hobbes or Jean Daillé, who had started to identify and discard mistaken attributions or datings of medieval documents or Church writings.

== Biography ==
He was born at Quimper in Brittany. Having acquired a taste for literature in his father's book-shop, he sought and obtained admission into the order of the Jesuits in around 1662 (when he was 16). In Paris, where he went to study theology. He ultimately became librarian of the Lycée Louis-le-Grand in 1683, and he died there.

His first published work was an edition of Themistius (1684), which included no fewer than thirteen new orations. On the advice of Jean Garnier (1612–1681) he undertook to edit the Natural History of Pliny for the Dauphin series, a task which he completed in five years. Aside from editorial work, he became interested in numismatics, and published several learned works on this subject, all marked by a determination to be different from other interpreters. When a fellow Jesuit once spoke to Hardouin about the shock his "paradoxes and absurdities" had given to the public, Hardouin brusquely replied, "do you think I would have got up at 4 AM all my life just to say what others have already said before me?" His works on this topic include: Nummi antiqui populorum et urbium illustrati (1684), Antirrheticus de nummis antiquis coloniarum et municipiorum (1689), and Chronologia Veteris Testamenti ad vulgatam versionem exacta et nummis illustrata (1696).

Hardouin was appointed by the ecclesiastical authorities to supervise the Conciliorum collectio regia maxima (1715); but he was accused of suppressing important documents and including apocryphal ones, and by the order of the parlement of Paris (then in conflict with the Jesuits) the publication of the work was delayed. After his death, a collection of works Opera varia appeared in Amsterdam in 1733. René-Joseph de Tournemine remarked in a review of this volume that if the anonymous editors had truly loved Hardouin, they would have left these works unpublished, and that that is what Hardouin's friend Pierre Daniel Huet would have done, who once said that Hardouin had laboured for forty years to ruin his own reputation without being able to accomplish it.

== Ideology ==
=== Concept of atheism ===
In 17th century France, the term "atheism" was frequently applied in a broad sense not only to those who denied or questioned the existence of God, but also to those who entertained erroneous ideas of the nature of God, denied God's providential government of the world or the existence of an afterlife with rewards and punishments, rejected Christianity, rejected sound Christian theology, or led immoral lives. The most noteworthy work which appeared in the 1733 Opera varia was Hardouin's Athei detecti (The Atheists Exposed), in which the atheists in question were Cornelius Jansen, André Martin, Louis Thomassin, Nicolas Malebranche, Pasquier Quesnel, Antoine Arnauld, Pierre Nicole, Blaise Pascal, René Descartes, Antoine Le Grand, and Pierre-Sylvain Régis. According to Hardouin, classical philosophical theology which identified God with transcendentals such as "being" and "truth," or as "infinitely perfect being," was atheistic. The Athei detecti was followed by an afterword titled Réfléxions importantes in which Hardouin undertook to demonstrate that atheism and Cartesianism are one and the same.

=== Biblical theories ===
Contrary to the received view that the Latin Vulgate edition of the New Testament was translated from the extant Greek text, Hardouin argued that all the books of the New Testament were originally written in Latin, or at least were translated into Latin with the approval of the authors from Hebrew or Greek originals which have been lost. Hardouin also argued that Jesus Christ himself spoke Latin on a daily basis, interpreting passages in the Gospels where Jesus' very words are recorded in Aramaic to indicate that this was not the language which he usually spoke.

In an essay published in 1708, later reprinted as an appendix to his commentary on the New Testament, Hardouin explained his interpretation of the incident at Antioch. According to the Gospels, Jesus gave his disciple Simon son of Jonah a new name given in Aramaic and Greek versions as "Cephas" and "Peter." Paul the Apostle writes in the Epistle to the Galatians of a time when "Cephas" came to Antioch, and Paul rebuked him to his face. Most ancient and modern commentators on this passage have taken for granted that the man who was rebuked is the Cephas who was one of the twelve disciples and is also called Peter. However, motivated by Protestant and Jansenist polemicists' use of the incident at Antioch as an objection against the supremacy and infallibility of Peter (and therefore of the pope as Peter's successor), Hardouin defends the opinion expressed by a few ancient authors that Paul rebuked another man who happened to also be named Cephas. Albert Pighius had earlier defended the same position. In the fifth and sixth chapters of his essay, Hardouin went so far as to assert that if one grants that Peter was rebuked by Paul, it would follow that Peter was guilty of heresy, and all faith in the sacred scriptures would be upset. This excess of zeal led to the placement of the commentary on the Index.

Jacques Boileau argued against Hardouin's thesis. Augustin Calmet, O.S.B., agreed with Boileau, and Francesco Antonio Zaccaria cites several other Catholic and Protestant authors who wrote against Hardouin, one of whom branded Hardouin's opinion with the theological censures of "error, temerity, insipidity, childishness, and imprudence." Most Catholic theologians of the 18th and 19th centuries followed Pighius and Hardouin. This position had fallen out of favour among Catholic exegetes by the 20th century, but has been defended by Clemens M. Henze, C.Ss.R., as recently as 1958.

Most recent critical scholarship on the New Testament has remained dismissive of a distinction between Peter and Cephas. Bart Ehrman defended the opinion that Peter and Cephas were different people in a 1990 article, which was rebutted by Dale Allison. Ehrman has more recently expressed doubts about the opinion he defended in his article, especially because of Allison's point that it is improbable that two prominent figures in the early Christian community both had the name Peter/Cephas, as there is only one recorded instance of the use of Cephas as a personal name, and no evidence of the use of Peter as a personal name, prior to the Christian tradition of Jesus' assignment of this name to Simon.

=== Views on ancient and medieval literature ===
Hardouin recalled that in August 1690, he began to suspect some of the works of St Augustine of Hippo and his contemporaries of being inauthentic, and by May 1692 he had "uncovered everything." Hardouin came to believe that for the first thirteen hundred years of Christianity, Christian doctrine had been handed down by an unwritten oral tradition, and books on theology had not been written; in the 14th century, all of the works of the Church Fathers as well as the medieval Scholastics had been counterfeited by "atheist" monks under the direction of a certain "Severus Archontius" for the sake of introducing heresy into the Church.

Accordingly, Hardouin believed the entire history of the Church from Pope Linus to the invention of the printing press to be fictitious; when Pierre Le Brun asked Hardouin why he had written his history of the ecumenical councils despite believing that none of the councils prior to the Council of Trent had taken place, he replied, "God and I only know."

Hardouin also believed that nearly all ancient secular literature was likewise manufactured to support the fraud, as he first publicly intimated in his work On the Coins of the Herods, writing, "let me propose here the conjecture of a man who has always been no silly inventor of conjectures, yet now perhaps is more suspicious than is reasonable and too greatly indulging his own cleverness. Let everyone take it for what he will. He has discovered—as he lately was whispering to me—that a band of certain men existed I know not how many centuries ago, who took up the task of composing ancient history as we now have it, because none of it existed then; he knows well what their era and their workshop were; and for this affair they had the help of Cicero, Pliny the Elder, Virgil's Georgics, and Horace' Satires and Epistles; for he thinks that these, as I fear he will persuade no-one, are the only authentic monuments out of Latin antiquity, except for a very few inscriptions, and some of the fasti." According to Hardouin, all other pre-modern literature was written in the same style of Greek or of Latin, far inferior to the style of the few genuine classical authors, which proved that all these works were composed in the same era, and he took any factual contradictions with the works he admitted as genuine as proof of the forgers' ignorance.

Tournemine composed a work titled Twelve Impossibilities of Father Hardouin's System which is now lost. In 1707, Michel Le Tellier launched an investigation into Hardouin's system at the behest of the Jesuit Superior General, Michelangelo Tamburini. Nearly a dozen Jesuits wrote to Tamburini, all opining that Hardouin's ideas were so dangerous to the Society of Jesus and the Catholic Church as to warrant their suppression.

Maturin Veyssière La Croze, a Protestant author, assailed Hardouin's system in a work written in French, and then another printed in Latin. La Croze interpreted Hardouin's "Severus Archontius" as a thinly veiled reference to Frederick II. Hardouin's Opera selecta published at Amsterdam in 1708 presented his system to the public in its clearest form yet.

The publication of the Opera selecta forced Hardouin's superiors to make their disapproval of his system public. In February 1709, a "Declaration" appeared in the Mémoires pour l'Histoire des Sciences & des beaux-Arts (generally known as the Journal de Trévoux) signed by Le Tellier and the superiors of the Jesuit houses in Paris, and attesting to Tamburini's approval of the statement as well, in which they said that the Amsterdam edition contained works they wished had never seen the light of day or would fall into oblivion. In particular, the signers wrote, "we reject as pernicious the paradox of the inauthenticity of the Greek text of Scripture, of the works of the Greek Fathers and of the Latin Fathers, and of other ecclesiastical monuments commonly recognised in the Church as genuine." They also regarded Hardouin's ideas on the dating of secular works of literature as "an unsustainable chimera," and especially condemned Hardouin's denial of the antiquity of secular works which were quoted by the Church Fathers. The declaration was followed by a statement signed by Hardouin himself, writing, "I sincerely subscribe to the whole content of the above declaration; in good faith, I condemn in my works what it condemns in them; and in particular, what I had said about an impious faction which some centuries ago had fabricated most ecclesiastical or secular works, which had passed up to now as ancient." Hardouin promised never to say anything either by spoken word or in writing which would be either directly or indirectly contrary to the retraction.

The Amsterdam edition was afterwards printed with an added "protestation" by Hardouin to the effect that the edition was unauthorised and unrevised by him; Hardouin also stressed La Croze' concession that Hardouin had not yet "explicitly proposed" that the Greek and Latin Fathers were inauthentic, and accused La Croze of attacking "not what he saw in my books, but what he believed himself to see there." Hardouin protested that he believed nothing about either the Greek or the Latin Fathers but what "the Roman Church, the most learned critics, and the ablest Catholic theologians" believed, and as for secular authors, he only believed, as the best critics do, that among authors who are authentically ancient there are some whose date one can reasonably doubt, but if Hardouin's thoughts had been peculiar, he says it would be a flagrant injustice to attribute them to the Society of Jesus as a group. Hardouin's protestation was followed by a reply from the printer insisting that he had faithfully printed these works as they came to him, and while he had offered to supplement the edition with any retraction or correction Hardouin wished to add, or sell the edition to another printer for the cost of his expenses, he would not alter the text as it stood, because his sales would be harmed if readers perceived the edition to be incomplete.

Despite Hardouin's public retraction, it is evident that Hardouin continued to hold the same ideas, as he expounded them further in his Ad censuram scriptorum veterum prolegomena which were certainly written after 1714, judging by their references to an episcopal pastoral letter of 1712 and to Hardouin's own Conciliorum collectio. In the Prolegomena, Hardouin also admits the authenticity of Plautus and of Virgil's Eclogues, and identifies the only extant works of ancient Greek literature as the Iliad, the Odyssey, and the histories of Herodotus, but strikes Cicero from his list, saying that his works also were composed by the conspirators. Upon their publication in 1766, the Prolegomena were savagely reviewed by Christian Adolph Klotz, who sarcastically wrote that his own time was so lacking in bad books and foolish men that it had proven necessary to wipe off the dust in which Hardouin's manuscript deservingly laid and deliver it to men who had never asked or looked for it.

Though admitting the authenticity of Virgil's Georgics and Eclogues, Hardouin devoted a special treatise to discrediting the authenticity of the Aeneid. Likewise, though Hardouin admitted the authenticity of Horace' Epistles and Satires, he composed a work purportedly demonstrating the spuriousness of the Odes, the Epodes, the Carmen saeculare, and the Ars poetica.

In a four-volume manuscript critical discussion of the Summa theologiae, Hardouin denied St Thomas Aquinas' authorship of the work, which he said was written by an atheist, and questioned the existence of Aquinas himself. Hardouin perceived anachronisms and heterodoxy in the Divine Comedy, which he believed had been falsely attributed to Dante Alighieri by its true author, a follower of John Wycliffe. Hardouin also detected heresy in the putative works of one of the most respected Jesuit theologians, St Robert Bellarmine; Hardouin declared Bellarmine's commentary on the Psalms the work of a godless man, and believed it was a work of Severus Archontius' monks which remained unpublished before Bellarmine was tricked into allowing it to be published under his name. Hardouin ascribed a similar origin to Bellarmine's devotional works On the Eternal Felicity of the Saints, The Groaning of the Dove, The Mind's Ascent to God, The Seven Words of the Lord, and The Art of Dying Well, as well as the hymn Pater superni luminis, and he also denied the authenticity of Bellarmine's Controversies on the Sacraments.

The historian Isaac-Joseph Berruyer had his Histoire du peuple de Dieu condemned for having followed this theory.

In the 1713–4 Boyle Lectures, Benjamin Ibbot cited Hardouin's belief in the spuriousness of nearly all ancient literature as an example to demonstrate that the opinion of one prestigious author in the face of an otherwise universal consensus did not lend credibility to such patently absurd ideas. Cuthbert Butler, dismissively citing Hardouin as the only author to have ever disputed St Benedict's authorship of his Rule (and also his existence), cast doubt on Hermann Weingarten's sceptical treatment of St Anthony the Great by suggesting the similarity of his methods to Hardouin's.

John Henry Newman argued in his Essay in Aid of a Grammar of Assent that "the cumulation of probabilities," not "formal logical sequence," is "the real method of reasoning in concrete matters," and as an example, discussed his reasons for rejecting Hardouin's theories about the inauthenticity of classical Latin literature. Newman acknowledged that forensic proof of these works' age is lacking and his certainty of their authenticity is disproportionate to the available evidence, and that "the numerous religious bodies, then existing over the face of Europe, had leisure enough, in the course of a century, to compose, not only all the classics, but all the Fathers too," but explained that "as to our personal reasons for receiving as genuine the whole of Virgil, Horace, Livy, Tacitus, and Terence, they are summed up in our conviction that the monks had not the ability to write them."

== See also ==
- Phantom time conspiracy theory
- New chronology (Fomenko)

== Works ==
De Backer, De Backer & Sommervogel 1893 contains a complete list of Hardouin's publications.

- Hardouin, Jean (1693). Chronologiæ ex nummis antiquis restitutæ prolusio de nummis Herodiadum. Paris: Jean Anisson.
- Hardouin, Jean (1709). Opera selecta. Amsterdam: Jean Louis de Lorme.
- Hardouin, Jean (August 1727). "Doutes proposez sur l'âge du Dante". Mémoires pour l'Histoire des Sciences & des beaux-Arts: 1516–34.
  - Hardouin, Jean (1847) [1727]. Doutes proposés sur l'âge du Dante. Paris: Benjamin Duprat.
- Hardouin, Jean (1733). Opera varia. Amsterdam: Henri du Sauzet.
- Hardouin, Jean (1741). Commentarius in novum testamentum. Amsterdam: Henri du Sauzet.
- Hardouin, Jean (1766). Ad censuram scriptorum veterum prolegomena. London.
  - English translation: Hardouin, Jean (1909). The Prolegomena of Jean Hardouin. Translated by Johnson, Edwin. Sydney: Angus and Robertson.
