= Frans van Bleyswyck =

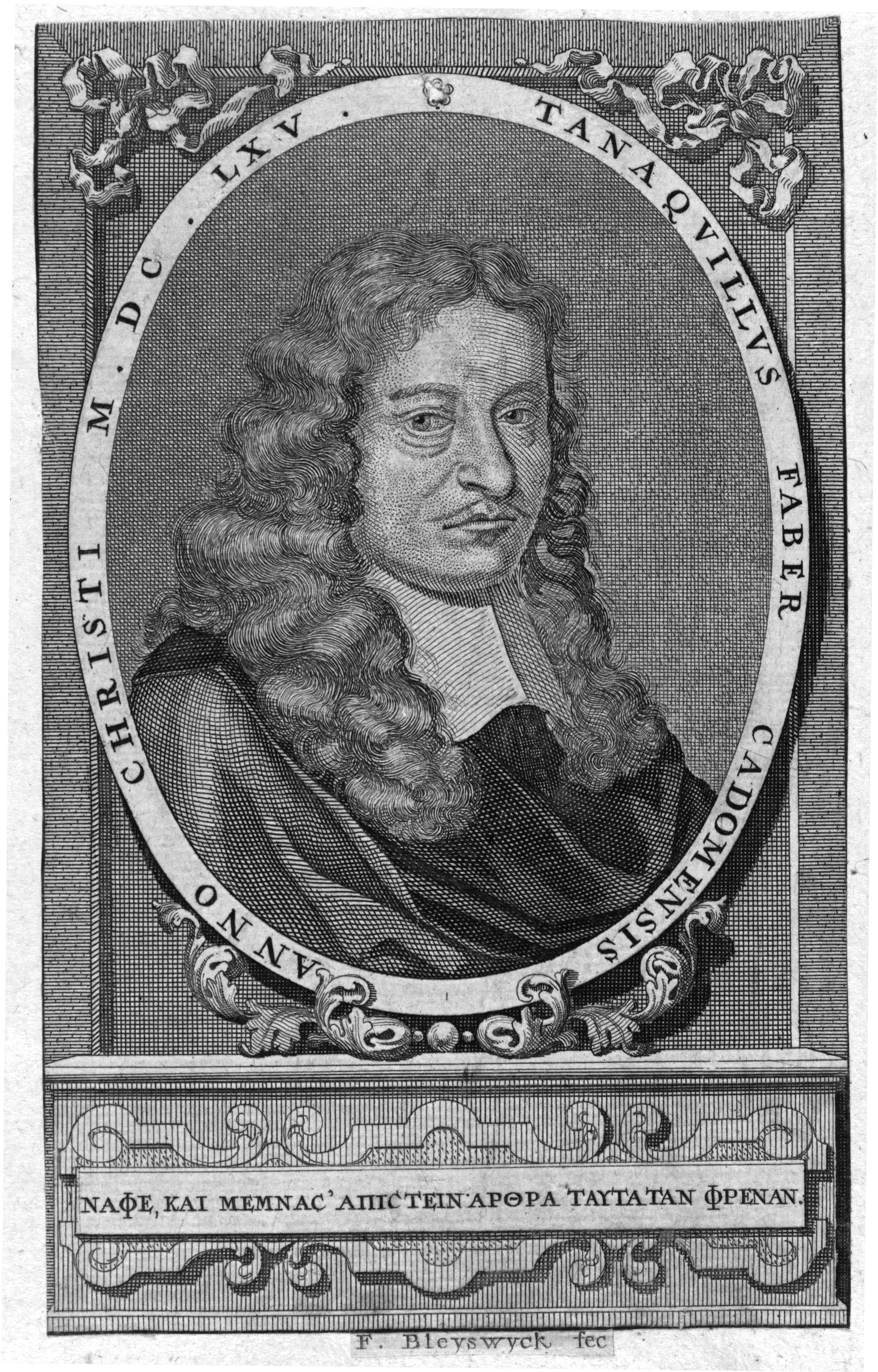
Book illustration: an engraving of Tanaquil Faber by Frans van Bleyswyck

Frans van Bleyswyck (May 1671 - October 1746) was an engraver from Leiden. Van Bleyswyck was christened in the Hoogland Church, Leiden, on 24 May 1671. It was the occasion for him to receive the Christian name of Frans. His main work was producing illustrations, including portraits, for books. In 1706 he enrolled with the Guild of Saint Luke in Leiden. The leiden etcher and engraver Johannes van der Spyck was his student.
