= De verborum significatione =

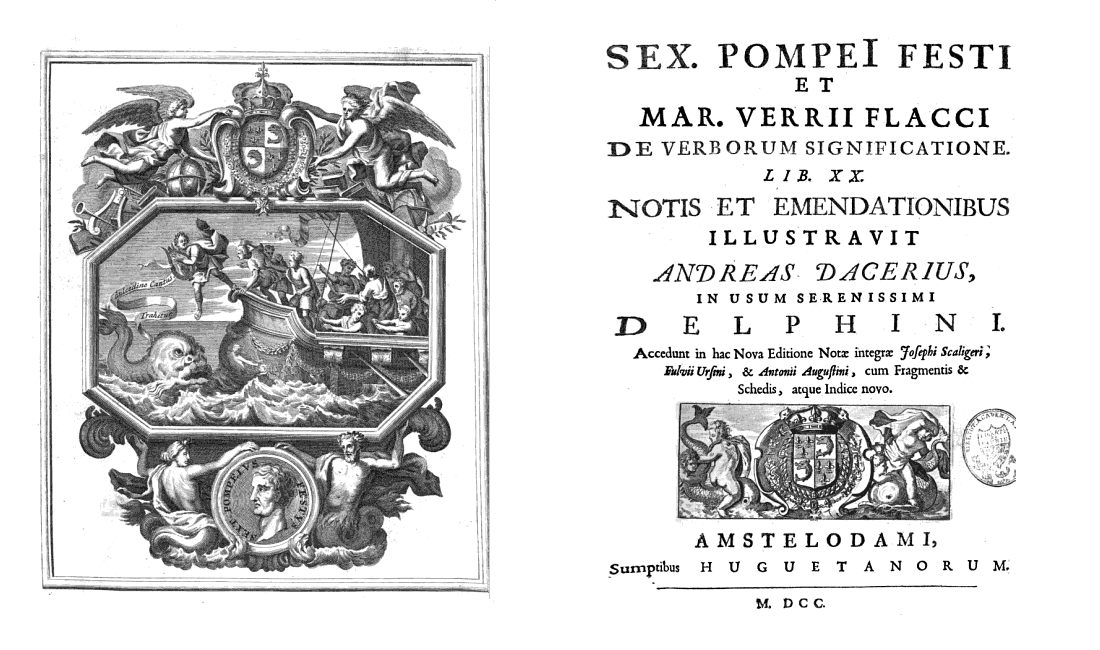
- Volume XX of André Dacier's edition (1700)
- Author: Sextus Pompeius Festus
- Genre: Epitome, encyclopedia
- Publication date: 2nd century
- Publication place: Ancient Rome

De verborum significatione libri XX (Note: Sometimes De verborum significatu.) ('Twenty Books on the Meaning of Words'), also known as the Lexicon of Festus, is an epitome compiled, edited, and annotated by Sextus Pompeius Festus from the encyclopedic works of Verrius Flaccus. Festus' epitome is typically dated to the 2nd century, but the work only survives in an incomplete 11th-century manuscript and copies of its own separate epitome.

== Background ==
Verrius Flaccus (c. 55 BCE – c. 20 CE) was a prominent Roman grammarian known for his writings on the Latin language and for tutoring the grandsons of Caesar Augustus during his reign. He is best known for De verborum significatu, the name which Festus later adopted for his epitome, the first major alphabetical Latin dictionary. The 40-volume lexicon is regarded as among the most important such works of classical antiquity, though all but a few fragments of the original have been lost, perhaps in part due to its impractical size.

Sextus Pompeius Festus, also a grammarian, likely flourished in the later 2nd century and is thought to have come from Narbo in Gaul, though few details are known about his life. Festus wrote his epitome of Flaccus' works during a time in the history of the Roman Empire when greater priority was placed on defense after a long period of expansion. There was an anxious effort by many scholars to record their history and culture as means of preservation. Though another of Festus' books is mentioned in De verborum significatione, none of his other works have survived.

Festus' work originally contained 20 volumes. The only surviving copy is the Codex Farnesianus, an 11th-century copy in poor condition, missing the first half of its alphabetized entries and suffering fire damage. Much of what is known about it comes from a summary of the full original, abridged in the 8th century by Paul the Deacon (Paulus Diaconus) as a contribution to the library of Charlemagne. As Festus reduced Flaccus from 40 to 20 volumes, so did Paul condense Festus by roughly half, excising entries he considered unnecessary or redundant, modifying parts of the text he thought unclear or obscure, and stripping away details like citations.

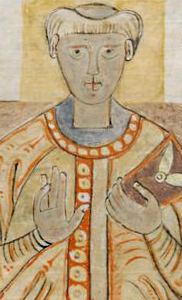
Paul the Deacon abridged and revised the work in the 8th century

== Content ==
The entries in Festus' epitome are organized semi-alphabetically, grouped according to first but not following letters, and with some exceptions according to particular themes, arguments, or sources. Festus altered some of Flaccus' text and inserted some critical remarks of his own. He updated the language, omitting Latin words that had fallen out of use, and documented his modifications in the now lost separate work, Priscorum verborum cum exemplis.

Though it is a summary, Festus preserves a great deal of Flaccus' original work, including etymologies and definitions and the rich historical, religious, political, and cultural information the original De verborum significatione is known for.

In an 1880 essay about Flaccus, classical scholar Henry Nettleship criticized Festus' work as "an affair of scissors and paste, in which conceit and incompetence are perhaps equally blended". Other scholars, like Alessandro Moscadi, suggest understanding it as instead a work of independent scholarship.

== Scholarship ==
When a copy of Paul's version was discovered by scholars at the Abbey of St. Gall in 1416, during the Italian Renaissance, it attracted a surge of renewed interest and study. The Italian humanists, who were enthusiastically seeking out and studying ancient Latin texts, made a number of significant contributions to the work, and several copies from the time still exist today.

De verborum significatione is a valuable resource for scholars studying language use, culture, religion, social life, and the broader history of ancient Rome. It also provides insight into other Romans and their works which used, were used by, influenced, or were influenced by Flaccus' work. For example, Flaccus utilized Marcus Terentius Varro's lost Antiquitates rerum humanarum et divinarum (47 BCE), while Pliny the Elder drew a great deal from Flaccus for his highly influential Naturalis historia (c. 77 CE). Among the other authors Festus cites are Lucius Accius, Cornificius, Sulpicius Rufus, Gaius Ateius Capito, and Ennius.

Festus included many quotations and citations from authors for whom it serves as the only record of their work. For others, such as Plautus, whose work would otherwise be known only through copies and quotations made much later, Festus provides verification or highlights the ways in which it had been altered.

The Festus Lexicon Project at University College London is collating the fragments that remain of Festus' work and republishing them with translations. The project's aims are to provide public access to the work and to encourage study of both the work itself and the subjects it covers.
