= Pierre Danet =

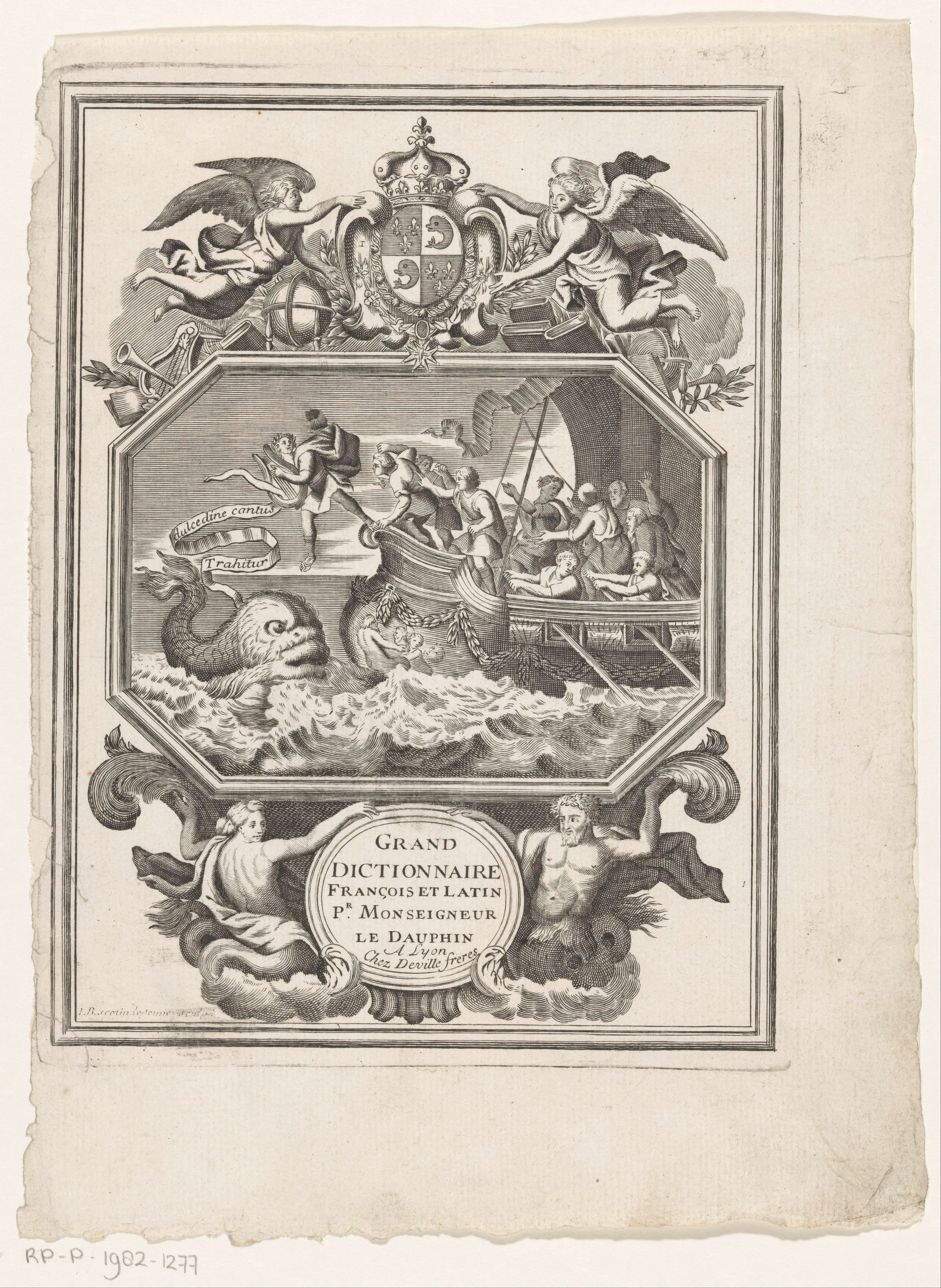
Pierre Danet. Grand Dictionnaire François et Latin. Lyon: Freres Deville, 1728.

Pierre Danet (1650 in Paris – 1709) was a French cleric, Latinist, Hellenist, Romanist and lexicographer.

In 1668, Danet was appointed in the editorial team of expenditure ad usum Delphini by Charles de Sainte-Maure, Duke of Montausier (1610-1690), the tutor of Louis, Grand Dauphin

In 1673, he became Magister Petrus Daneticus academicus, and from 1677 Petrus Danetius Academicus, abbas Sancti Nicolai Virdunensis (abbot of Saint-Nicolas in Verdun).

In the 18th century, Pierre Danet's dictionary experienced numerous editions and adaptations and served as the basis for multiple dictionaries with European languages.

== Works ==
- Dictionarium novum latinum et gallicum, Paris 1673, 1680; Magnum Dictionarium latino-gallicum, Paris 1691, 1696, 1704, Lyon 1708, 1712, 1726, 1739, Amsterdam 1711
- Nouveau Dictionnaire françois et latin, enrichi des meilleures façons de parler en l'une et l'autre langue, composé par l'ordre du Roy pour Monseigneur le Dauphin, Paris 1683, 1687, 1700, 1707; Grand dictionnaire français et latin, Amsterdam 1710, Lyon 1713, 1721, 1735, 1737, Toulouse 1731, 1754, Paris 1972
- Radices seu dictionarium linguae latinae in quo singulae voces suis radicibus subjiciuntur, Paris 1677
- Dictionarium antiquitatum romanarum et graecarum, Paris 1698, Amsterdam 1701

== Bibliography ==
- Franz Josef Hausmann: Sprachwissenschaft im Wörterbuchvorwort. Das französisch-lateinische Wörterbuch des Pierre Danet (1673-1691), in: Die Frühgeschichte der romanischen Philologie: von Dante bis Diez, Hans-Josef Niederehe and Brigitte Schlieben-Lange, Tübingen 1987, (p. 123–133)
