= André Martin (philosopher) =

André Martin CO (French: [maʁtɛ̃]; 1621 – 26 September 1695) was a French Catholic priest and philosopher.

== Biography ==
Born at Bressuire in 1621 to Gabriel Martin and Marie Pouget, he was admitted to the Oratory of Jesus on 22 August 1641, and ordained a Catholic priest in 1646.

The first member of the Oratory to publicly teach Cartesianism, Martin was ordered by François Bourgoing in 1652 to cease teaching his course in philosophy at Marseille and retire to Arles on account of continual disobedience to superiors' orders which was felt to expose the Oratory to danger from the Holy See and the civil authorities alike. In 1653, he published his most notable work, Philosophia moralis christiana, under the pseudonym John Camerarius. This book, treating the principal subjects in philosophy according to the thought, and often following the words, of St Augustine of Hippo, was placed on the Index Librorum Prohibitorum by Pope Innocent X, and soon republished by its author under a new title and pseudonym as Sanctus Augustinus by Ambrose Victor. Nicolas Malebranche thought highly of this book. On account of his treatment of the existence of God in this work, Martin was branded an "atheist" by Jean Hardouin, who also regarded the works of St Augustine which it was based on as forgeries created by atheists. Martin is said to have also composed a work treating theology according to the thought of Augustine in the same manner, which was never printed.

In 1679, Martin was appointed professor of theology at Saumur, where it is said that some Protestant professors, alarmed that Martin had induced several of their pupils to enter the Catholic Church, forbade the others to attend his lectures. The theses which Martin published while there were much sought after in their time, but were accused of favouring Jansenism, leading to his dismissal. Though the Bishop of Angers, Henri Arnauld, and the Archbishop of Paris, François de Harlay de Champvallon, found Martin innocent of heresy, King Louis XIV refused to restore him to his post. Martin died at Poitiers 26 September 1695.

== Sources ==
- Batterel, Louis (1904). Mémoires domestiques pour servir à l'histoire de l'oratoire (in French). Vol. 3: Les péres de l'oratoire ... qui ont vécu sous le P. Senault. Paris. pp. 518–29.
- Dreux du Radier, Jean-François (1849). Histoire littéraire du Poitou (in French). Vol. II. Niort. pp. 225–7.
- du Pin, Louis Ellies (1708). Bibliothèque des auteurs ecclésiastiques du dix-septième siècle (in French). Vol. 3. Paris. p. 329.
- Tabaraud, Matthieu-Mathurin (1820). "Martin (André)". Biographie universelle, ancienne et moderne (in French). Vol. 27. Paris. pp. 304–5.
