= Traitté de l'origine des romans =

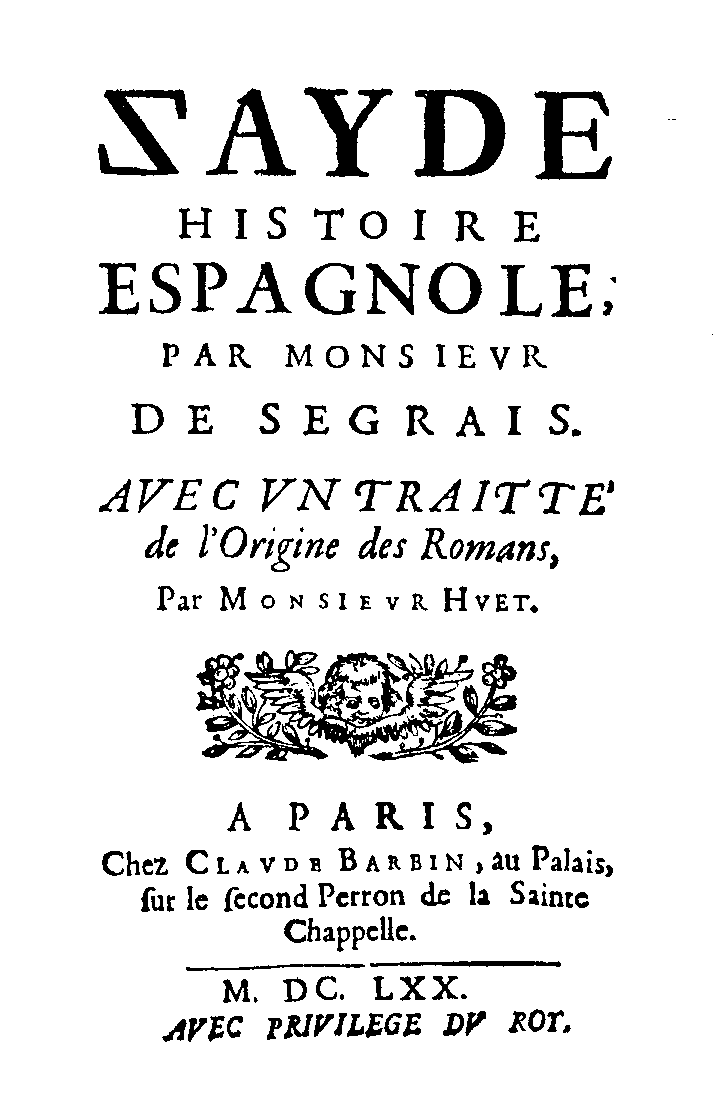
Marie de LaFayette's Zayde (1670), the original context of Huet's Traité de l'origine des romans

Pierre Daniel Huet's Trai[t]té de l'origine des Romans (Treatise on the Origin of Novels, or Romances) can claim to be the first history of fiction. It was originally published in 1670 as preface to Marie de la Fayette's novel Zayde. The following will give extended excerpts from the English translation by Stephen Lewis published in 1715. The title page reads:

THE| HISTORY| OF| ROMANCES.| AN| Enquiry into their Original| Instructions for Composing them;| AN| Account of the most Eminent| AUTHORS;| With Characters, and Curious Observations| upon the Best Performances of that Kind.| [rule]| Written in Latin by HUETIUS;| Made English by STEPHEN LEWIS.| [rule]| —juvat integros accedere fontes,| Atque haurire. Lucr.| [rule]| LONDON:| Printed for J. HOOKE, at the Flower-de-luce, and| T. CALDECOTT, at the Sun; both against St.| Dunstan's Church in Fleetstreet. 1715.

Pages i-xi gave a preface by Lewis, p.[xii] added “Corrigenda”, p. 1-149 offered the translation under the short title “Original of Romances”.

The excerpt is extensive and it will mainly serve students of literature interested in the scope of questions and the method of arguing the early historian of literature showed—Huet was a modern cultural historian, one could say. (The German parallel page de:Traitté de l'origine des romans offers a summary of the plot with selected quotes and might be more comprehensive):

== Excerpt ==
=== The Preface by Stephen Lewis, 1715 [p.i-xi] ===
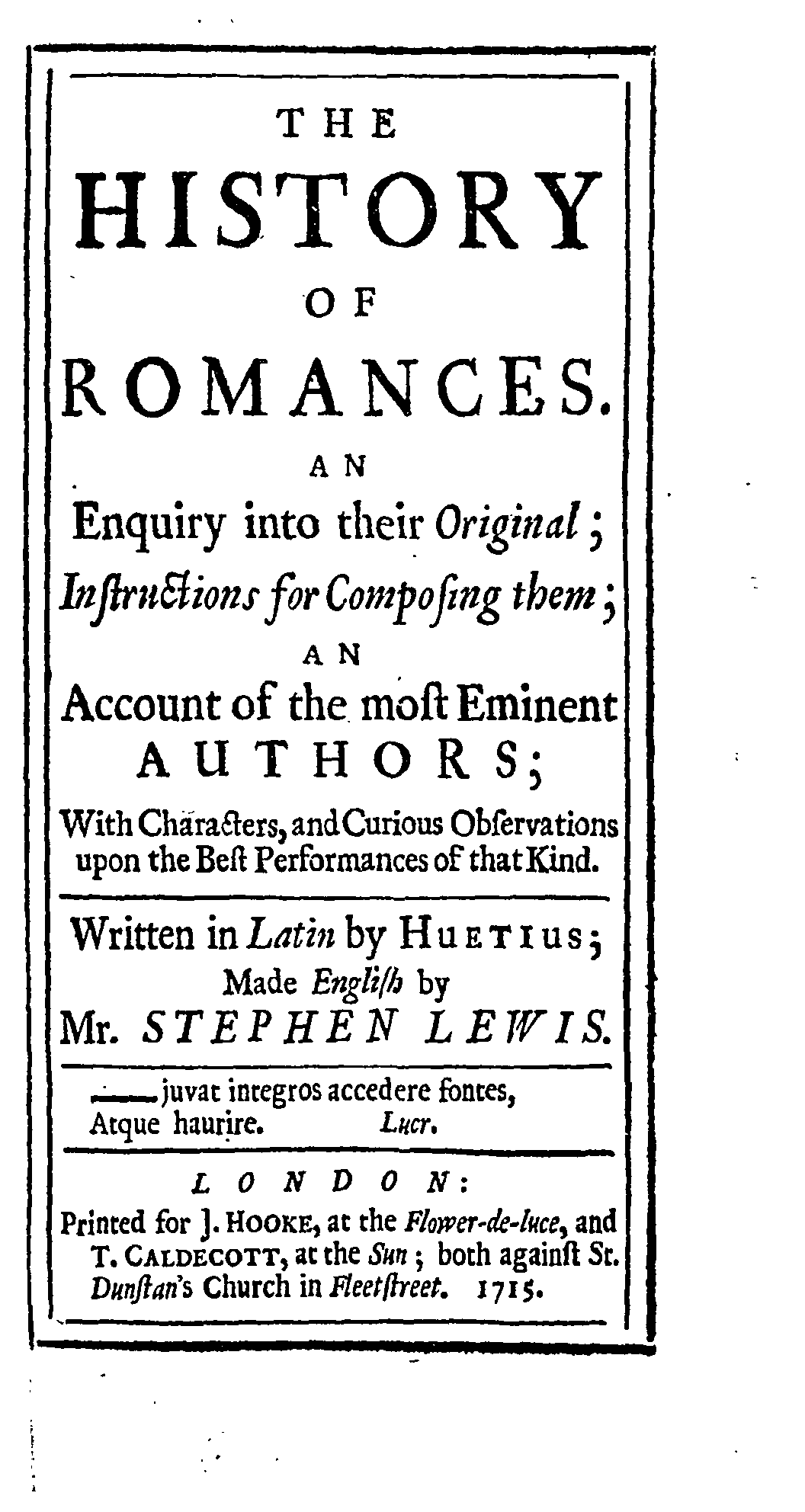
Stephen Lewis' translation, 1715

'THERE is not any Speculation, which affords a more agreeable Pleasure to the Mind, than that of beholding from what Obscure and Mean Beginnings, the most Polite and Entertaining Arts have|<j/ij> risen to be the Admiration and Delight of Mankind. To pursue them up to the most abstruse Fountains, and then to view by what Steps they arise to Perfection; does not only excite an Amazement at their Increase; but an Impatient Desire of Inventing some New Subject, to be improv'd and advanc'd by Posterity.

The first Occasion of introducing ROMANCE into the World, was, without Dispute to mollify the Rigour of Precepts, by the Allurements of Example. Where the Mind can't be subdued into Virtue, by Reason and Philosophy; nothing can|<ij/iij> influence it more, than to present to it the Success and Felicity, which Crowns the Pursuit of what's Great and Honourable.

The beginning of romances is to be searched for in a far distant past and of interest to “the Curious in Antiquity”

Upon this Account, They are very much indebted to the Labour and Penetration of Huetius; who has, with great Judgement, traced the Subject he undertook to Illustrate, till he found it in|<iv/v> its Infancy, involved in the Umbrage of Fable, and perplexed in the Folds of Mystery and Riddle. [p.iv-v]

The treatise has found a wide audience in Latin and French translations. The new English translation is designed to attract a growing audience:

Especially since Romance has of late convey'd it self very far into the Esteem of this Nation, and is become the Principal Diversion of the Retirement of People of all Conditions. [p.v]

=== Huet's Text: The Original of Romances. [p.1-149] ===
==== What is a Romance? ====
The Name of Romance was formerly extended not only to Prose but Verse; Giradi and Pigra, in their Treatises de Romanzi, scarce mention any other, and lay down the Bayrdos and Arioste for Instances of their Opinion. But the Custom of this Age prevails to the contrary; so that we esteem nothing to be properly Romance but Fictions of Love Adventures, disposed into an Elegant Style in Prose, for the Delight and Instruction of the Reader.

I call them Fictions, to discriminate them from True Histories; and I add, of Love Adventures, because Love ought to|<4> be the Principal Subject of Romance. It is required to be in Prose by the Humour of the Times. It must be compos'd with Art and Elegance, lest it should appear to be a rude undigested Mass, without Order or Beauty. [p.3-4]

"Instruction" is the next argument, yet Huet does not go into tedious details here. "Virtue" is placed against "Vice", "Disgrace" is to be avoided. The next step is the definition of "Romance" versus "Epic Poem". Both have one thing in common if one follows Aristotle's definition of Poesy: they are fictional:

[...] in several Respects there is a great Relation between them; and according to Aristotle (who informs us, That 'tis Fiction rather than Verse which makes a Poet) a Writer of Romance may be reckon'd among the Poets. Petronius tells us, That Poems are to move in great Circumference by the Ministry of the Gods, and Expressions vast and audacious; so that First, They may be looked upon as Oracles throughout, from a Spirit full of|<7> Fury, and then for a faithful and exact Narration.

Romances preserve a much greater Simplicity, and are not so exalted, nor have the same Figures in Invention and Expression.

Poems have more of the sublime, though they are not always confined to Probability. Romances have more of Probability, though they don't advance so far toward the Sublime.
Poems are more regular and correct in the Frame of their Contrivance, and receive less Addition from Events and Episodes than Romances, which are capable of these Accessions, because their Style is not so elevated, and they don't so far di|<8>sten'd the Intellect, so that they give it leave to admit a greater Number of different Ideas.

In short, Poems make some Military Act, or Politick Conduct, their Theme, and only descant upon Love at Pleasure; whereas Romances, on the contrary, have Love for their Principal Subject, and don't concern themselves in War or Politicks, but by Accident. I speak of Regular Romances, for those in Old French, Spanish, and Italian, have generally more of the Soldier than Gallant. [p.7-8]

The differences between histories and romances are connected with the fictional status—a problem is here caused by histories full of erroneous notions:

These Works are true in the Main, and false in some Parts. Romances, on the contrary, are false in the Gross, and true in some Particulars. [...|<10>] I mean, that Falsehood is so predominant in Romance, that it may be altogether False in Whole and every Particular. [p.10]

Huet excludes Histories if the authors wanted to give rue accounts and just failed and he excludes "fables":

[...] for Romance is a Fiction of Things which may, but never have happen'd; whereas the Matter of Fables is what never has, nor ever will be perform'd. [p.13]

==== An Ancient Practice: Religions Use Fictions to Create Secret Knowledge ====
The following part of the treatise touches the origin of "romances". The peoples of Asia, especially those of Egypt had, so Huet claims, proven a tendency to decipher all kinds of information. The hieroglyphs prove that. Their whole religion and all their histories were deciphered, mostly to exclude the population from further knowledge. Initiations were afforded before one would gain access to the secret cultural knowledge Egypt stored. The Greeks |<p. 17> had been extremely eager to learn from Egypt:

'Twas without doubt from these Priests, that Pythagoras and Plato, in their Voyage to Ægypt, learned to Transform their Philosophy, and hide it under the Shadow of Mystery and Disguise. [p.17]

The Arabs exploited the same cultural knowledge—their Koran is, so Huet says filled with knowledge one cannot understand without interpretation. The Arabs translated Greek fables into their language and via Arabia [p. 20] these materials finally reached Europe. This is proven by the fact that only after the occupation of Spain first romances appeared in southern France. Huet discusses Persias culture—as particularly obscure and full of secret knowledge, he mentions the Indians [p. 27] as particularly fond of poesy, before he speaks of the influence the Bible had on the western civilization and its love of fictions:

The Holy Scripture is altogether Mysterious, Allegorical, and Ænigmatical. The Talmudists are of Opinion that the Book of Job is no other than a Parable of the Hebrews|<32> Invention; this Book, that of David, the Proverbs, Ecclesiastes, the Canticles, and all other Holy Songs, are Poetical Works abounding with Figures, which would seem bold and violent in our Writings, and which are frequent in those of that Nation. The Book of Proverbs is otherwise call'd the Paraboles, because Proverbs of this sort, according to the Definition of Quintilian, are only short Figures or Parables express'd in little.

The Book of Canticles is a kind of Dramatic Poem, where the passionate Sentiments of the Bridegroom and Spouse are expressed after a Manner so tender and touching, that we|<33> should be charmed and affected with it, if the Expression and Figures had a little more Conformity to our Genius; or if we could Divest our selves of Prejudice, which disposes us to dislike every Thing which is the least different from what we are used to; tho' by this Practice we condemn our selves without perceiving it, since our Lightness never permits us to continue long in the Approbation of any Thing.
Our Saviour himself scarce ever gave any Precepts to the Jews but under the Veil of Parables. [...] [p.33]

Huet is extremely interested in changing tastes and in the relativity of judgments—he is far from any simple theory of cultural progress or decline. His concept is rather one of different functions knowledge and fictions can gain. Fables stood in the centre of his discussion so far. The next passages gain a wider perspective:

But it is not enough to have discovered The Original of Romances; we must see by what Streams they have spread and convey'd themselves into Greece, and Italy, and whether they have passed from thence to us; or we have received them from any other Nation. [p.35]

==== Novels of Luxury: Persia, Greece and Rome ====
The ancient world developed a high cultural standard. Luxury commodities became important. Persia was the country of highest refinement, producing perfumes and dances before the Milesians imported much of that culture:

But the Milesians, above all the rest, discover'd the indulging Temper, surpassed them all in the Accuracy of their Pleasures, and shew'd the most singular Taste for Delicacies. They were the first who introduced the Art of Romancing among the Persians, when they had had such Success in it themselves, that the Milesian fables, the same with Romances, full of Love Adventures, and Licentious Relations, advanced into the Highest Reputation: 'Tis probable Romances were Innocent 'till they fell into their hands, and before recounted only singular and memorable Adventures.

But these were the first who corrupted them [...]

One does not have any material artefacts to prove this, yet the ancient historians help us here with their accounts. The Ionians influenced the Greeks. Alexander the Great did much to widen their cultural concepts. The Milesian Fables by Aristides of Miletus were finally translated into Latin. The book was criticized in Rome's Senate as hardly serving the purposes of a Rome involved in wars.

Huet mentions names and develops a canon of texts and reaches Heliodorus who has to be compared with Jamblicus, the author of the Babylonics, which have only survived in fragments:

Heliodorus excell'd him in the Desposition of his Subject, and indeed in every other Particular. Hitherto the World had not seen any thing better designed, and more compleat in Romance, than the Adventures of Theagenes and Chariclia: Nothing can be more chaste than their Loves. By this it appears, (beside the Honour of the Christian Reli|<50>gion which he professed) that he had in his own Nature such an Air of Virtue, as shines throughout the Work; in which not only Jambicus, but almost all the rest, are much his Inferiors. His Merit advanc'd him to the Dignity of an Episcopal See: He was Bishop of Tricca, a City of Thessaly. Socrates reports, that he introduced into that Diocese, the Custom of Deposing such of the Clergy, as did not abstain from the Women they had contracted before their Admission into Orders. This makes me very much suspect what Nicephorus, a credulous Writer, of little Judgement or Sincerity relates; That a Provincial Synod, understanding|<51> the Danger which the Reading this Romance (so highly Authorised by the Dignity of its Author) might expose Young People to; proposed, that he should either consent to the Burning of his Book, or the Resignation of his Bishoprick; and that he accepted the latter of the Conditions.[p.51]

Achilles Tatius' Leucippe and Clitophon enters the canon, and Huet is uncertain about the chronology of events:

However, he is not to be compared to Heliodorus, either for the Regularity of his Manners, the Variety of Events, or the Artifice of Unraveling his Plots. Indeed his Style is to be preferr'd to that of Heliodorus, because 'tis more Simple and natural; whereas the other's is more forced. Some say, that he was a Christian, and a Bishop too. 'Tis strange, that the Obscenity of his Book should be so easily forgot; and more so, that the Emperor Leo VI, sirnamed the Philosopher, should commend the Modesty of it, in an Epigram which is yet extant; and not only permit but recommend the Reading of it with the clo|<54>sest Application, to all those who profess the Love of Chastity. [p.54]

Then, referring to Longos and his Daphnis and Chloe:

My Judgement upon the Pastorals of Longus the Sophist, is the same with that I gave of the Two former Romances. For|<78> tho' the Learned of Late Times have commended them for their Elegance and Agreement, joined to a Simplicity proper to the Nature of the Subjects; yet I can observe nothing in it, but that Simplicity, which sometimes declines to Childishness and Impertinence. There is nothing in it of Invention, or Conduct. He begins grosly in the Birth of his Shepherds, and ends with their Marriage. He never clears up his Adventures, but by Machines improper, and ill contrived. His Expressions are so obscene, that one must be somewhat a Cynic, to read them without Blushing. His Style does not deserve the Commen|<79>dations it receives. 'Tis the Style of a Sophist, such as he was [...] which partakes of the Orator and Historian, tho' it be proper for neither of them. 'Tis full of Metaphors, Antitheses, Figures, which dazzle and surprise the Simple, and tickle the Ear, without satisfying the Mind; instead of Engaging the Reader, by the Novelty of Events, the Arrangement of Variety of Matter, a clear and close Narration, attended by a smooth and regular Cadence, which always advances within the Subject.

He endeavours (as all Sophists do) to entertain his Reader with Accidental Descripti|<81>ons: He leads him out of the way; and while he admits him so far into a Country he did not look for, he spends and exhausts the Attention and Impatience he had to arrive at the End he proposed. [p.80]

Rome does not play more than a marginal role. Huet mentions "Sybaritian Fables" and the love fiction of Ovid, yet only Petronius wrote something like a "romance" in Latin. Ovid mentions a Roman esteem of romances, Huet's comment:

Hence appears the Esteem Romances had in Rome; which is more evident, by the Romance which Petronius (one of their Consuls, and the most polished Man of his Time) composed. He disposed it into the|<93> Form of a Satyr, of the same Kind which Varro invented, intermixing Prose with Verse, the Serious with the Jocose, and stiled it Menippean; because Menippus had before treated of Serious Matters in a Pleasant Style.

This Satyr of Petronius fails not to be a True Romance: It contains nothing but diverting and ingenious Fictions, tho' they are sometimes too licentious and immodest. He hides under a Disguise a fine and poignant Raillery, against the Vices of Nero's Court. What remains of it, are some incoherent Fragments, or rather Collections of some industrious Person; so that one can't exactly discern|<94> the Form and Connexion of the whole Piece; tho' it appears to be conducted with Order. And 'tis probable those incoherent Parts, would compose a very Compleat Body, with the Addition of those which are lost. Tho' Petronius seems to be a very great Critic, and of an exquisite Taste in Learning; his Style does not always advance to the Delicacy of his Judgement: Something of Affectation may be observed. In some Places he's too Florid and Adorned; and degenerates from that Natural and Majestic Simplicity, which shined in the Agustan Age. [p.94]

==== The Northern Tradition: Fictions of a Dark Age of Ignorance ====
The ancient authors excelled with satires and texts which are no longer extant—a history which ended in darkness with the invasion of Germanic tribes causing the fall of the Roman empire:

Hitherto the Art of Romancing was maintained with some Splendor, but it soon decayed with Learning and the Empire; when the Furious nations of the North disseminated, with their Bodies, the Ignorance and barbarity of their Minds. Romances were hitherto composed for|<101> Delight. Fabulous Histories were now introduced, because none were acquainted with the Truth. Taliessin, who lived about the Middle of the Sixth Age, under that King Arthur so famous in Romances; and Melkin, who was somewhat younger, writ the History of England, his Country, of King Arthur, and the Round Table. Balæus, who has put them in his Catalogue, speaks of them, as of Authors filled with Fables. The same may be said of Hunibaldus Francus, who (as some relate) was Contemporary with Clovis, and whose History is no other but a Mass of Lies grossly conceived. [p.101]

The present age—the late 17th century—has learned to live with a differentiation between fiction and fact. The Middle Ages were marked by a completely different frame of mind. Huet reaches the stories written about king Arthur and Merlin:

[...] those which contained the Atchievements of King Arthur, and the Life of Merlin.|<104>

These Diverting Histories pleased the Readers, who were more ignorant than those who composed them. They did not, in those Days, trouble themselves with Researches into Antiquity, and after being informed of the Truth of what they wrote. They had the Stuff in their own Head, and went no farther than their own Invention. Thus Historians degenerated into True Romancers.

In this Age of Ignorance, the Latin Tongue, as well as Truth, was neglected and despised. The Versifiers, Composers, Inventers of tales, Jesters, and in short, all of this Country who studied what they called the Gay Science, began about the Time of Hugh|<105> Capet, to set upon Romancing with great Fury; and soon over-ran France, by dispersing them. These Fables were composed in the Roman Tongue [...]

The term romance was now invented—to denote the Spanish and French Language these texts were written in:

The Spaniards use the Word Romance in the same Signification with us, and call their ordinary Language by that Name. The Romain being then most universally understood, those of Provence who apply'd themselves to Fictions, made use of it in their Writings, which from thence were called Romances. [p.106]

The idea of a tradition coming via Spain to Europe is thus balanced by a second option: [p. 108-09] Taliessin and Melkin were English heroes, Huet notes. The romances touching them must have been composed originally around 550.

==== Where Traditions Met: Europe and Another Theory of the Anthropology of Fiction ====
The development into the 17th century gives the Amadis of Gaul a central position [p. 114-16] and leads to Cervantes Don Quixote—which is rather a critic of "romances" than a romance itself. The following long passage gives Huet's picture of the intellectual network behind the rise of the modern novel—and of the traditions which now met:

All Europe was then overwhelmed with Darkness and Ignorance, but France, England, and Germany much less than Italy, which then produced but a small Number of Writers, and scarce any Authors of Romances. Those of that Country, who had a Mind to distinguish themselves by Learning and Knowledge, came for it to the University of Paris, which was the Mother of Sciences, and Nurse of the Learning of Europe. St. Thomas Aquinas, St. Bonaventure, the Poets Dante, and Boccace, came thither to study; and the President Fauchet produces, that the last of them took a great Part of his Novels from French Ro|<121>mances; and that Petrarch, and the other Italian Poets, have rifled for their Richest Fancies, the Songs of Thiband King of Navarre, Gace's Brussez, Chastelain de Corcy, and the Old French Romances. 'Twas then, in my Opinion, that the Italians learned from us the Science of Romance; which, by their own Confession, is to be ascribed to us, as well as that of Rhyming.

Thus Spain and Italy received from us an Art, which was the Effect of our Ignorance and Barbarity, and which the Politeness of the Persians, Ionians, and Greeks had produced. As Necessity engages us, to sustain our Bodies|<122> with Herbs an Roots; so when the Knowledge of Truth, which is the Proper and Natural Aliment of the Mind, begins to fail, we have Recourse to Falsehood, which is the Imitation of Truth. As in Plenty we refuse Bread, and our ordinary Viands, for Ragousts; so our Minds, when acquainted with the Truth, forsake the Study and Speculation of it, to be entertained with its Image, which is Fiction. This Imitation according to Aristotle, is often more agreeable than the Original it self; so that two oppositely different Paths, which are Ignorance and Learning, Rudeness and Politeness, do often conduct us to the same End; which is|<123> an Application to Fictions, Fables, and Romances. Hence it is, that the most Barbarous Nations are taken with Romantic Inventions, as well as the most Refined. The Originals of all the Savages of America, and particularly those of Peru, are nothing but Fables; no more are those of the Goths, which they wrote in their Ancient Runic Characters, upon great Stones; the Remains of which I my self have seen in Denmark. And if any Thing were left us of the Works, which the Bards among the Ancient Gauls composed, to eternize the Memory of their Nation, I don't question but we should find them enriched with Abundance of Fictions.

This Inclination to Fables, which is common to all Men, is not the Result of Reason; Imitation, or Custom. 'Tis Natural to them, and has its Seat in the very Frame and Disposition of their Soul. For the Desire of Knowledge is particular to man, and distinguishes him from Beasts no less than his Reason. nay we may observe in other Creatures some Rude Impressions of this; whereas the Desire of Understanding is Peculiar to Us only.

The Reason of this, according to my Opinion, is; because the Faculties of the Soul are too Vast an Extent, to be supplied by the Present Objects, so that 'tis obliged to|<125> have recourse to what's past, and to come, in Truth and in Fictions, in Imaginary Spaces and Impossibilities, for Objects to exert it self upon. The Objects of Sense fill the Desires of the Soul of Brutes, who have no farther Concern; so that we can't discover in them these restless Emotions, which continually actuate the Mind of Man, and carry it into the Pursuit of a recent Information, to proportion (if possible the Object to the Faculty; and enjoy a Pleasure resembling that which we perceive in the Appeasing a Violent Hunger, and Extinguishing a Corroding Thirst. This is that which Plato intends, in the Marriage of Do-|<126>rus and Penia, (in which Terms he would express Riches and Poverty,) which produces exquisite Pleasure. The Object is signified by Riches, which are not so but in Use and Intention; otherwise they are unfruitful and afford no Delight. The Faculty is intended by Inquietude, while 'tis separated from Riches; whereas its Union with them, supplies the Highest Satisfaction. The Case is the same with our Souls: Poverty, the same with Ignorance, is Natural to it; it sighs continually after Science; which is its Riches; and when 'tis possess'd of this Enjoyment, it feels the greatest Pleasure. But|<127> this Pleasure is not always equal; it often is the Purchase of much labour and Difficulty: As when the Soul applies it self to intricate Speculations, and Occult Sciences, the Matter whereof is not present to our Senses; where the Imagination, which acts with Faculty, has a Less Part in the Pursuit than the Understanding, whose Operations are more Vehement and Intense: And because Labour is naturally tedious, the Soul is not carried to Hard and Spinous Learning, unless in Prospect of some Advantage, or Hope of some remote Amusement, or else by Necessity. But the Knowledge which attracts and delights it most, is that which is acquired without|<128> Pain and where the Imagination alone acts on Subjects which fall under our Sense, ravish our Passions, and are great Movers in all the Affairs of Life. Such are Romances, which require no great Intention or Dispense of Mind, to understand them. No long Reasonings are exacted; the Memory is not overburthened: Nothing is demanded, but Fancy and Imagination. They move our Passions; but 'tis on purpose to sooth and calm them again: They excite neither Fear nor Compassion; [u]nless it be to display to us the Pleasure of seeing those we are afraid, or concern'd for, out of Reach of Danger or Distress. In short, all our Emo|<129>tions there find themselves agreeably provoked and appeased.

'Tis hence, that those who act more by [Passion than Reason], and labour more with their Imagination than Understanding, are affected by them; tho' these other are touched by them too, but after another manner. These are touched by the Beauties of Art, which amuse the Understanding; but the former, Ignorant and Simple, are sensible of no more than what strikes upon the Imagination, and stirs their Passions. They love the Fiction, and enquire no farther. Now Fictions being nothing but Narrations, True in Appearance, and False in Reality; the Minds of the Simple, who discern on|<130>ly the Disguise, are pleased and highly satisfied with this Shew of Truth. But those who penetrate farther, and see into the Solid, are easily disgusted with the Falsity: So that the first love Falsehood, because it is concealed under an Appearance of Truth; the Latter are distasted with the Image of Truth, because of the Real Forgery which is couched under it; unless it be varnished with Ingenuity, Subtility, and Instruction, and recommends it self by the Excellency of Invention and Art. St Augustin makes this Observation somewhere; 'That these Falsities which carry a Signification, and suggest an Hidden Meaning, are not Lies,|<131> but the Figures of Truth; which the most Wise and Holy Persons, and even our Saviour himself, have used upon Honourable and Pious Occasions.'

Since then 'tis true, that Lies commonly flow from Ignorance, and the Grossness of our Intellect; and that this Inundation of the Barbarians, who issued from the North, spread over all Europe, and plunged it into such profound Ignorance, as it could not clear it self from, within the Space of Two Ages; is it not then probable, that this Ignorance caused the same Effect in Europe, which it had produced every where besides? And is it not vain to enquire for that in|<132> Chance, which we find in Nature? There is then no Reason to contend, but that the French, German, and English Romances, and all the Fables of the North, are Fruits of those Countries, and not imported from Abroad: That they never had other Originals than the Histories stuffed with Falsities, and made in Obscure Ignorant Times, when there was neither Industry nor Curiosity to discover the Truth of Things, nor Art to describe it, if 'twas found: That these Histories have been well received by the Unpolished and Half-barbarous People; and that the Historians thereupon took upon them the Liberty to pre|<133>sent them with what was purely forged, which were the Romances.

The whole development of fiction is thus not one of continuities—but one of different traditions and complex reasons why fictions develop. Huet reaches the present age and passes through numerous titles:

==== Fictions and the Modern Period ====
I shall not undertake to [...] examine whether Amadis de Gaul were originally from Spain, Flanders, or France; and whether the Romance of Tiel Ulespiegel be a Translation from the German; or in what Language the Romance of the Seven Wise Men of Greece was first written; or that of Dolopathos, which some say was extracted from the Parables of Sandaber the Indian. Some say 'tis to be found in Greek in some Libraries; which has furnished the Matter of an Italian Book call'd Erastus, (and of many of Boccace his Novels, as the same Fauchet has remarked) which was written in La-|<137>tin by John Morck, or the Abby de Hauteselne, whereof Ancient Copies are to be seen; and translated into French by the Clerk Hubert, about the End of the Twelfth Age, and into High Dutch about Three Hundred Years afterwards; and an Hundred Years after that, from High Dutch into Latin again, by a Learned hand, who changed the Names of it, and was ignorant that the Dutch had come from the Latin.
It shall suffice if I tell you, that all these Works which Ignorance has given Birth to, carried along with them the Marks of their Original, and were no other than a Complication of|<138> Fictions, grossly cast together in the greatest Confusion, and infinitely short of the Excellent Degree of Art and Elegance, to which the French Nation is now arrived in Romances. 'Tis truly a Subject of Admiration, that we, who have yielded to others the Bays for Epic Poetry, and History, have nevertheless advanced these to so high a Perfection, that the Best of theirs are not Equal to the Meanest of ours.

We owe (I believe) this Advantage to the Refinement and Politeness of our Gallantry; which proceeds, in my Opinion, from the great Liberty which the Men of France allow to the|<139> Ladies. They are in a manner Recluses in Italy and Spain; and separated from Men by so many Obstacles, that they are scarce to be seen, and not to be spoken with at all. Hence the Men have neglected the Art of Engaging the Tender Sex, because the Occasions of it are so rare. All the Study and Business there, is to surmount the Difficulties of Access; when this is effected, they make Use of the Time, without amusing themselves with Forms. But in France, the Ladies go at large upon their Parole; and being under no Custody but that of their own Heart, erect it into a Fort, more strong and secure than|<140> all the Keys, Grates, and Vigilance of the Douegnas. The Men are obliged to make a Regular and Formal Assault against this Fort, to employ so much Industry and Address to reduce it, that they have formed it into an Art scarce known to other Nations.

'Tis this Art which distinguishes the French from other Romances, and renders the Reading of them so Delicious, that they cause more Profitable Studies to be neglected.

The Ladies were first taken with this Lure: They made Romances their Study; and have despised the Ancient Fa|<141>ble and History so far, that they now no longer understand those Works, from which they received their greatest Embellishments: And lest they should blush at this Ignorance, which they find themselves so often guilty of; they perceive they had better disapprove what they don't know, than take the Pains to learn it.

The Men, in Complaisance, have imitated them; condemned what they disliked, and call that Pedantry, which made an Essential Part of Politeness, even in Malherbe's Time. The Poets, and other French Writers who succeeded, have been constrained to submit to this Arbi|<142>tration; and many of them, observing that the Knowledge of Antiquity would be of no Advantage to them, have ceased to study what they durst not practise: Thus a very Good Cause has produced an Ill Effect; and the Beauty of our Romances has drawn upon them the Contempt of Good Letters, and consequently Ignorance.

I don't, for all this, pretend to condemn the Reading of them. The Best Things in the World are attended with their Inconveniencies; Romances too may have much worse than Ignorance. I know what they are accused for: They exhaust our Devotion, and in|<143>spire us with Irregular Passions, and corrupt our Manner. All this may be, and sometimes does happen. But what can't Evil and Degenerated Minds make an Ill Use of? Weak Souls are contagious to themselves, and make Poyson of every Thing. Histories must be forbidden, which relate so many Pernicious Examples; and the Fable must undergo the same Fate; for there Crimes are authorised by the Practice of the Gods. [...|<144>]

Little Regard was had to Sobriety of manners, in most Part of the Greek and Old French Romances, by Reason of the Vice of the Times in which they were composed. [...] But the Modern Romances (I speak of the Good ones) are so far from this Fault, that you'll scarce find an Expression, or Word, which may shock Chaste Ears, or one single Action which may give Offence to Modesty.

If any one object; That Love is treated of in a Manner so Soft and Insinuating, that the Bait of this Dangerous Passion invades too easily the Tender Hearts; I answer, That it is so far from being Dangerous, that it is in some Respects Necessary, that the Young People of the World should be acquainted with it; that they may stop their Ears to that which is Criminal, and be better fortified against its Artifices; and know their Conduct, in that which has an Honest and Sacred End. This is so true, that Experience lays before us, that such as are least acquainted with Love, are the most unguarded to its As|<145>saults, that the most Ignorant are soonest decoyed. Add to this that Nothing so much refines and polishes Wit; Nothing conduces so much to the Forming and Advancing it to the Approbation of the World, as the Reading of Romances. These are the Dumb Tutors, which succeed those of the College, and teach us how to Live and Speak by a more Persuasive and Instructive method than theirs [...]. [p.145]

Huet has with this survey reached the end of his treatise. D'Urfee and Mademoiselle de Scudery become important here:

Monsieur D'Urfee was the first who retrieved them from Barbarity, and reduced them to Rules, in his Incomparable Astrea, The most Ingenious and Polite Work which has appeared in this Kind, and which Eclipsed the Glory which Greece, Italy and Spain, had acquired. [...|<146>]

None can, without Amazement, read those which a Maid as Illustrious in her Modesty, as her Merit, has published under a Borrowed Name; depriving her self so Generously of that Glory which was her Due, and not seeking for Reward, but in her Virtue; as if while She took so much Trouble for the Honour of our Nation, She would spare that Shame to Our Sex. But Time has done her that Justice, which she had denied her self; and has informed us, that the Illustrious Bassa, Grand Cyrus, and Clælia, are the Performances of Madam de Scudery [...].

The last lines refer to the following "history" Zayde—which will, so Huet, deserve all praise:

The Virtues which conduct his Reign are so Noble, and the Fortune which attend them so Surprizing, that Posterity would doubt whether it were a History, or a Romance. [p.149]

...which is the final sentence.
