= Anne Dacier =

French scholar (1651–1720)

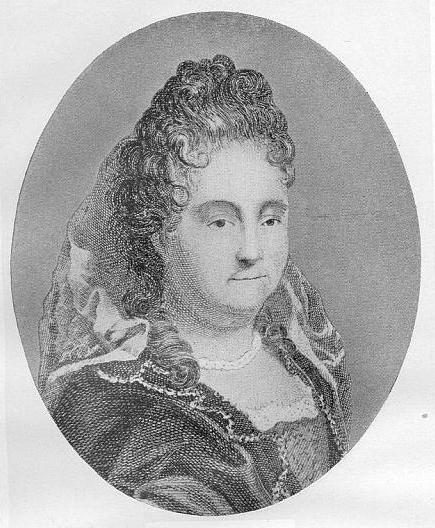
- Born: Anne Le Fèvre c. 1651
- Died: 17 August 1720 (aged c. 69); Paris, France
- Occupations: Linguist, translator, writer, commentator and editor of the classics
- Spouse: Andre Dacier (m. 1683)
- Parent(s): Tanneguy Le Fèvre; Marie Olivier

Miniature of Madame Dacier by Marie Victoire Jaquotot

Anne Le Fèvre Dacier (French pronunciation: [an lə fɛvʁ dasje]; c. 1651 – 17 August 1720), better known during her lifetime as Madame Dacier ([madam dasje]), was a French scholar, translator, commentator and editor of the classics, including the Iliad and the Odyssey. She sought to champion ancient literature and used her great capabilities in Latin and Greek for this purpose as well as for her own financial support, producing a series of editions and translations from which she earned her living. She was the dedicatee of Gilles Ménage's Historia mulierum philosopharum, whose characterisation of her and of Anna Maria van Schurman was used to provide leading examples in treatises arguing for female education across the following centuries.

== Early life and education ==
The exact date of her birth is not known and sources differ in their opinions: 1647 is proposed by Frade and Wyles and also Conley in the Internet Encyclopedia of Philosophy; the Encyclopædia Britannica suggests 1654; and the Catholic Encyclopedia 1651. The only known portrait of her, dated 1854, has her death at the age of 68, suggesting 1651–52. Eliane Itti argues for 1645, on the basis of the parish register at Is-sur-Tille which would set the date of her baptism to 24 December 1645. Dacier was first raised at Preuilly, in Touraine, where her sister Marguerite was born. She spent the rest of her childhood in Saumur, a town in the Loire region of France, and was taught both Latin and ancient Greek by her father, Tanneguy Le Fèvre.

On 29 October 1662, she married Jean Lesnier II. They had a son, Taneguy, born in January 1669, but who died three weeks later. The couple separated around 1670. In 1683, she married one of her father's students, André Dacier (also engaged in classical studies and translations albeit his work is considered by encyclopedia editors to be far inferior to hers).

== Classical editions and translations ==
Her father died in 1672, after which she moved to Paris, carrying with her part of an edition of Callimachus, which she published in 1674. She gained further work through a friend of her father, Pierre-Daniel Huet, then assistant tutor to the Dauphin and responsible for the Ad usum Delphini series (commonly known as the Delphin Classics) of editions of the Latin classics. He commissioned her to produce editions for the series of Publius Annius Florus (1674), Dictys Cretensis (1680), Sextus Aurelius Victor (1681) and Eutropius (1683).

In 1681, her prose version of Anacreon and Sappho appeared, and in the next few years, she published prose versions of Plautus' Amphitryon, Epidicus and Rudens (1683), Aristophanes' Plutus and Clouds (1684, the first translations of Aristophanes in French) and Terence's six comedies (1688). In 1684 she and her husband retired to Castres, with the object of devoting themselves to theological studies. In 1685 the Daciers were rewarded with a pension by Louis XIV of France for their conversion to Roman Catholicism. Anne and André Dacier collaborated on two translations, Marcus Aurelius' Meditations (1691) and Plutarch's first six Parallel Lives (1694).

In 1711, her prose translation of the Iliad appeared, which earned her the esteem in which she is held in French literature. It was followed in 1716 by a similar translation of the Odyssey. Alexander Pope found these two works very useful for his own translations (Iliad (1715-1720) and Odyssey (1725–1726)). Dacier in turn published, in her second edition of the Iliad, remarks on Pope's translation of the same, which gained her some fame in England as well.

== Controversy ==
The Iliad, which made Homer known for the first time to many French men of letters (including Antoine Houdar de la Motte) gave rise to a famous literary controversy. In 1714, La Motte, who could not read Greek, published a poetical version of the Iliad, abridged and altered to suit his own taste, together with a Discours sur Homère ("Discourse on Homer"), stating the reasons why Homer failed to satisfy his critical taste. Dacier replied in the same year in her work, Des causes de la corruption du goût ("Of the Causes of the Corruption of Taste"). In defending Homer, Dacier "developed her own philosophical aesthetics. She insists on the centrality of taste as an indicator of the level of civilization, both moral and artistic, within a particular culture."

La Motte carried on the discussion with light gaiety and badinage, and had the happiness of seeing his views supported by the abbé Jean Terrasson, who in 1715 produced two volumes titled Dissertation critique sur L'Iliade ("Critical essay on The Iliad"), in which he maintained that science and philosophy, and especially the science and philosophy of René Descartes, had so developed the human mind that the poets of the eighteenth century were immeasurably superior to those of ancient Greece.

In the same year, Claude Buffier published Homère en arbitrage ("Homer in arbitration"), in which he concluded that both parties were really agreed on the essential point that Homer was one of the greatest geniuses the world had seen, and that, as a whole, no other poem could be preferred to his; and, soon after (on 5 April 1716) in the house of Jean-Baptiste-Henri de Valincour, Dacier and La Motte met at supper, and drank to the health of Homer.

Like many eighteenth-century intellectual women, she faced sexism and criticism of her work during her lifetime. Enlightenment philosopher Immanuel Kant, in his Observations on the Feeling of the Beautiful and Sublime, critiqued learned women of the time, including Mme. Dacier stating: "A Woman who has a head full of Greek, like Mme. Dacier, or who conducts disputations about mechanics, like the Marquise du Châtelet might as well also wear a beard; for that might perhaps better express the mien of depth for which they strive."

== Sources ==
- Lejay, Paul (1908). "André Dacier" . In Herbermann, Charles (ed.). Catholic Encyclopedia. Vol. 4. New York: Robert Appleton Company.
