= Isaac-Joseph Berruyer =

French Jesuit historian

Isaac-Joseph Berruyer S.J. (French pronunciation: [izak ʒozɛf bɛʁyje]; 7 November 1681, Rouen – 18 February 1758, Paris) was a French Jesuit historian. He entered the Society of Jesus in 1697. He is most famous for his work A History of the People of God, published in three parts.

== Works ==
The first part of his History bears the title Histoire du peuple de Dieu depuis son origine jusqu'à la venue du Messie (7 vols., Paris, 1728). A revised and augmented edition of this was published in Paris in 1733. Next followed (Paris, 1734), a supplement, containing a continuation of the prophecies of the Old Testament, the History of Job, maps necessary for understanding the sacred history, etc. By 1736 seven editions of the work had been issued. It was translated into German, Italian, Spanish, and Polish.

The second part of his History was published, also at Paris, in 1753 under the title Histoire du peuple de Dieu depuis la naissance du Messie jusqu'à la fin de la Synagogue. in 1754 an édition plus exacte appeared at Antwerp (8 vols.) and in 1755, at Paris, still another edition (4 vols.). The latter contained five questions: (1) On Christ, the object of scriptures; (2) On Christ, the Son of God; (3) On Christ, the Son of Man; (4) On Christ, the founder of a new religion; (5) On the Presentation of Christ in the Temple and the Purification of the Blessed Virgin Mary. According to Augustin de Backer this second part of the History was published without the knowledge, and against the will, of the superiors in the Jesuit house in Paris. Berruyer put his name to only a small number of copies of this publication.

The third part, titled Histoire du peuple de Dieu, ou paraphrase des Épitres des Apôtres (2 vols., Lyons, 1757), aroused an uproar and some bitter controversy. The freedom with which he described certain facts was considered unbecoming. Serious fault was found with the author for giving portions of the sacred narrative the air of romance rather than of sober history. Some propositions put forward by him were construed as favoring Nestorianism. But above all Berruyer was accused of following the opinions of Jean Hardouin.

The work was condemned by many bishops of France, by the superiors of the Society, by the Sorbonne, and by the Parliament of Paris. The first part was put on the Index Librorum Prohibitorum, 27 May 1732; the second part, 3 December 1754, and by a Brief of Benedict XIV, 17 February 1758; the third part 24 April 1758, and by and Brief of Clement XIII, 2 December 1758. (See Index Librorum Prohibitorum, Rome, 1900, 62). A corrected edition of the first part, approved by the Roman Censors, was published at Besançon in 1828.
