= Pierre Daniel Huet =

French churchman and scholar (1630–1721)

The Most Reverend Pierre Daniel Huet
- Bishop of Avranches
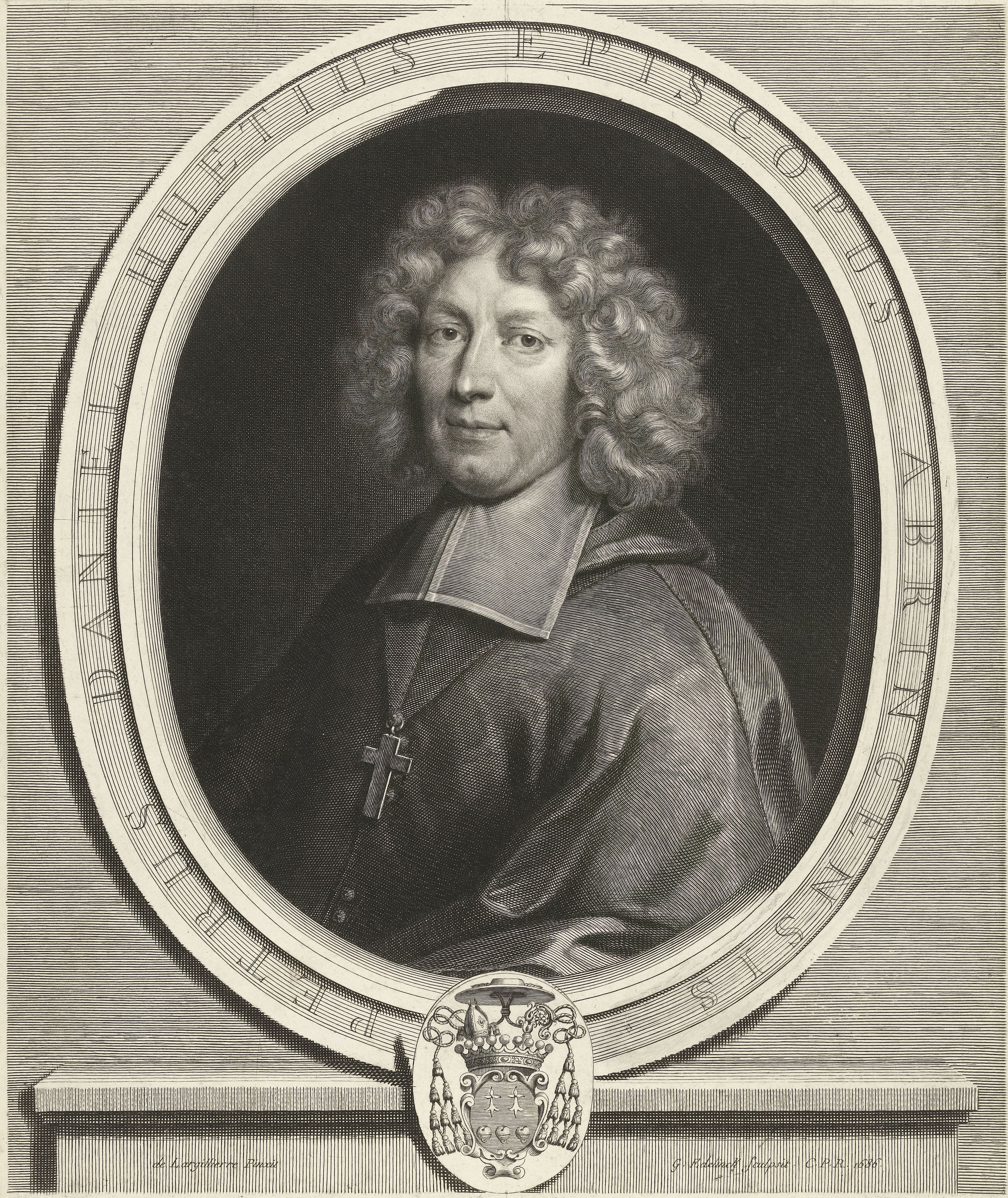
- Engraved portrait of Pierre Daniel Huet by Gérard Edelinck after Nicolas de Largillière, 1686
- Church: Roman Catholic
- In office: 1692-1699
- Predecessor: Fabio Brulart de Sillery
- Successor: Roland-François de Kerhoën de Coëtanfao
- Other post: Bishop of Soissons (1685-89)

Orders
- Consecration: 24 August 1692 by François de Harlay de Champvallon

Personal details
- Born: 8 February 1630 Caen, France
- Died: 26 January 1721 (aged 90) Paris, France

Pierre Daniel Huet (French: [y.ɛ]; Latin: Huetius; 8 February 1630 – 26 January 1721) was a French churchman and scholar, editor of the Delphin Classics, founder of the Académie de Physique in Caen (1662–1672) and Bishop of Soissons from 1685 to 1689 and afterwards of Avranches.

== Life ==
He was born in Caen in 1630, and educated at the Jesuit school there. He also received lessons from a Protestant pastor, Samuel Bochart. By the age of twenty he was recognized as one of the most promising scholars of his time. In 1651 he went to Paris, where he formed a friendship with Gabriel Naudé, conservator of the Mazarin Library. In the following year Samuel Bochart, being invited by Queen Christina of Sweden to her court at Stockholm, took his friend Huet with him. This journey, in which he saw Leiden, Amsterdam and Copenhagen, as well as Stockholm, resulted chiefly in the discovery, in the Swedish royal library, of some fragments of Origen's Commentary on St Matthew, which gave Huet the idea of editing and translating Origen into Latin, a task he completed in 1668. He eventually quarrelled with Bochart, who accused him of having suppressed a line in Origen in the Eucharistic controversy. While working on Origen's Greek text, Huet wrote a separate treatise on translation history, theory, and practice, the "De optimo genere interpretandi" ("On the best kind of translating") in two books (first published 1660; 3rd and last ed. Amsterdam, 1683).

Huet was also the cofounder of the Académie de Physique in Caen, the first provincial academy of science to be granted a royal charter (1668). Huet was the initial patron of the academy, and along with Andre Graindorge, directed the work of the group, which focused on the empirical study of nature, with a special emphasis on anatomy and dissections. Huet's presence was critical to the success of the academy, which floundered without his continued presence. He acted as head of the group from 1662 to 1667, and again in 1668, when he left Caen again for Paris. He also ended his financial support of the academy at this time, as it began to receive royal funding and direction from the royal representative in Normandy, Guy Chamillart.

In Paris he entered into close relations with Jean Chapelain. During the famous "dispute of Ancients and Moderns", Huet took the side of the Ancients against Charles Perrault and Jean Desmarets. Among his friends at this period were Valentin Conrart and Paul Pellisson. His taste for mathematics led him to the study of astronomy. He next turned his attention to anatomy, and, being short-sighted, devoted his inquiries mainly to the question of vision and the formation of the eye. In the course of this study, he made more than 800 dissections. He then learned all that was then to be learned in chemistry, and wrote a Latin poem on salt.

All this time he was a frequent visitor to the salons of Mlle de Scudéry and the studios of painters; his scientific researches did not interfere with his classical studies, for during this time he was discussing with Bochart the origin of certain medals, and was learning Syriac and Arabic under the Jesuit Adrien Parvilliers.

Huet was admitted to the Académie française in 1674. He took holy orders in 1676, and two years later the king made him abbot of Aunay. In 1685 he became Bishop of Soissons, but after waiting for installation for four years he took the bishopric of Avranches instead. He exchanged the cares of his bishopric for what he thought would be the easier chair of the Abbey of Fontenay, but there he was vexed with continual lawsuits. At length he retired to the Jesuits' House in the Rue Saint-Antoine at Paris, where he died in 1721. His great library and manuscripts, after being bequeathed to the Jesuits, were bought by the king for the royal library.

== Works ==
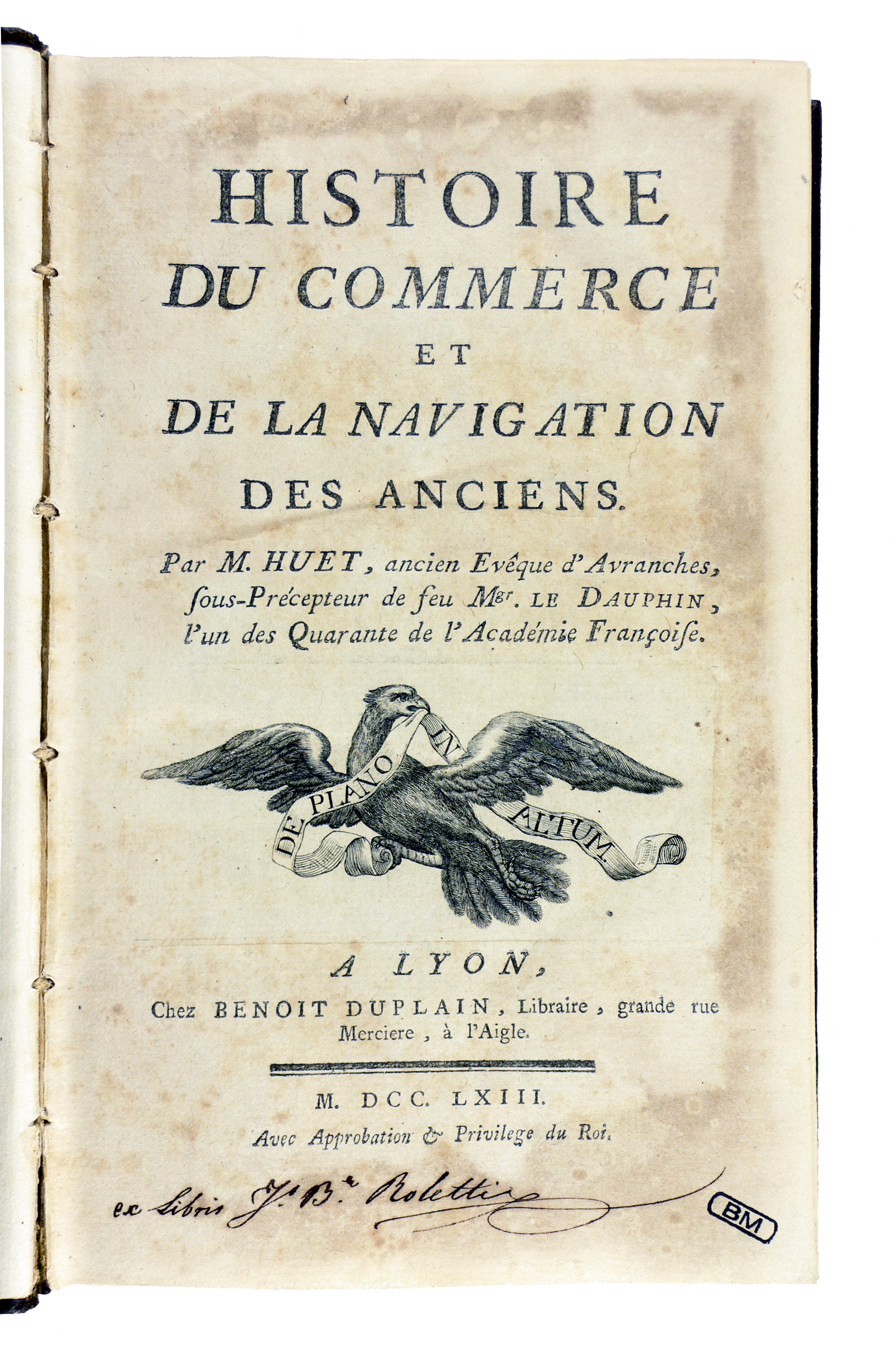
Histoire du commerce, 1763.

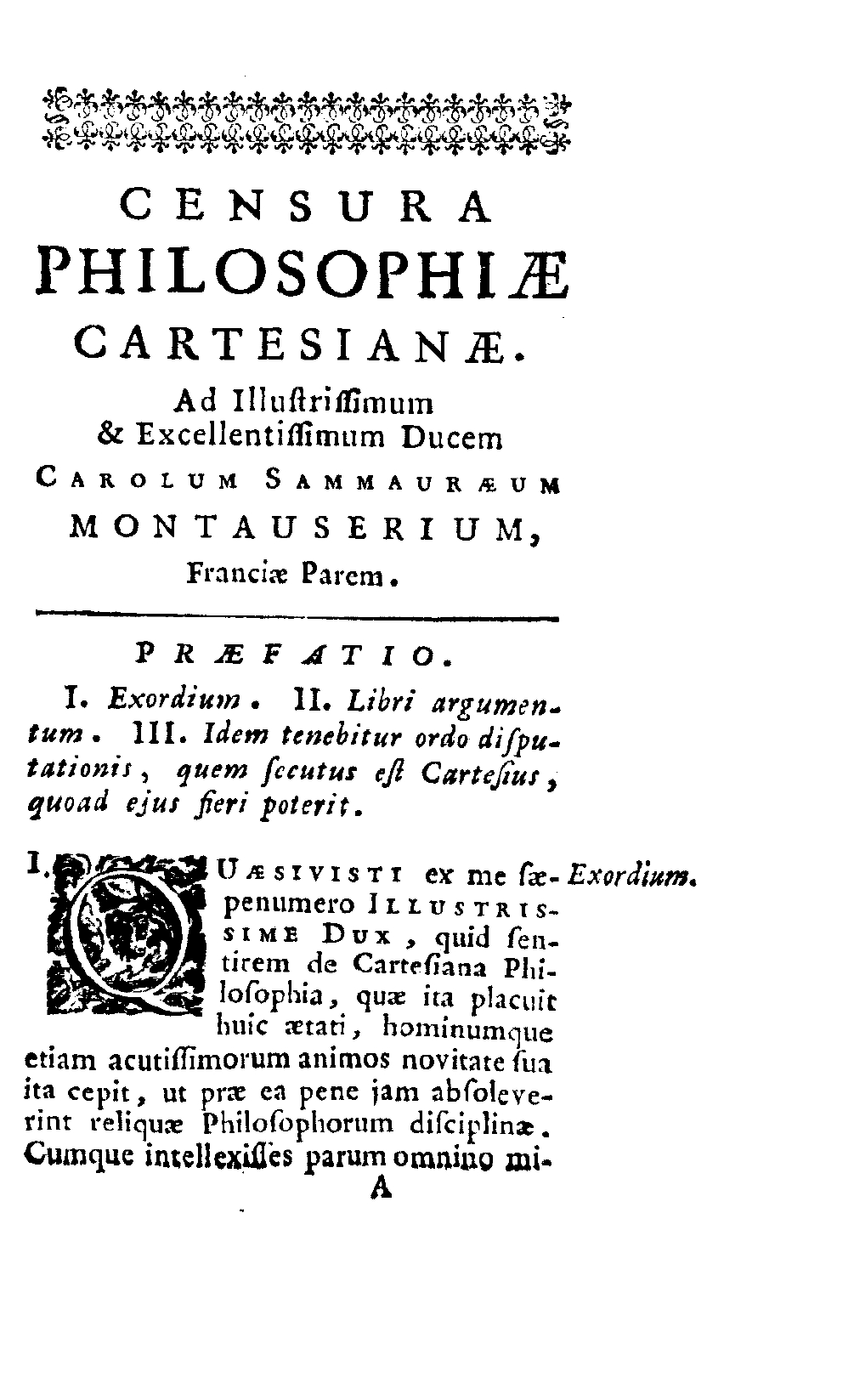
Censura philosophiae Cartesianae, 1723

He translated the pastorals of Longus, wrote a tale called Diane de Castro, and gave with his Traitté de l'origine des romans (1670), his Treatise on the Origin of Romances the first world history of fiction. On being appointed assistant tutor to the Dauphin in 1670, he edited, with the assistance of Anne Lefêvre (afterwards Madame Dacier) and Jacques-Bénigne Bossuet, the well-known book series, the Delphin Classics (referred to in the original Latin as the "Ad usum Delphini" series). This series published comprehensive editions of the Latin classics in about sixty volumes, and each work was accompanied by a Latin commentary, ordo verborum, and verbal index. The original volumes have each an engraving of Arion and a dolphin, and the appropriate inscription in usum serenissimi Delphini.

In addition to Huet's edition and translation of the ancient Greek theologian Origen, Huet published two works on the history and process of translation itself, "De optimo genere interpretandi" ("On the best kind of translating") and "De claris interpretibus" ("On famous translators"; 3rd and last ed. 1683).

He issued one of his major works, the Demonstratio evangelica, in 1679. At Aulnay he wrote his Questiones Aletuanae (Caen, 1690), his Censura philosophiae Cartesianae (Paris, 1689), his Nouveau mémoire pour servir à l'histoire du Cartésianisme (New Memoirs to Serve The History of Cartesianism, 1692), and his discussion with Nicolas Boileau-Despréaux on the Sublime.

A. E. Housman described Huet as "a critic of uncommon exactness, sobriety, and malevolence". In the Huetiana (1722) of Pierre-Joseph Thoulier d'Olivet will be found material for arriving at an idea of his prodigious labours, exact memory and wide scholarship. Another posthumous work was his Traité philosophique de la faiblesse de l'esprit humain (original spelling: Traité philosophique de la foiblesse de l’esprit humain) (Amsterdam, 1723), which he considered to be his best work. His autobiography, found in his Commentarius de rebus ad eum pertinentibus (Paris, 1718), has been translated into French and into English.

According to Maurice Rat, Huet "was after Ménage the best etymologist of his time". For example, it was he who understood that the final "bec" of certain toponyms of French Normandy (such as Bec Abbey or Houlbec) means "stream" and is related to the German word of the same meaning "Bach", also present at the end of many toponyms.

== Legacy ==
The lycée in Hérouville-Saint-Clair, Calvados, was formerly named after Huet, though it has now ceased to be so.

== Sources ==
- Pierre Daniel Huet, Against Cartesian Philosophy (Censura Philosophiae Cartesianae). Amherst: Humanity Books 2003.
- April G. Shelford, Transforming the Republic of Letters: Pierre-Daniel Huet and European Intellectual Life, 1650-1720 (Rochester, University of Rochester Press, 2007).
- James Albert DeLater, "Translation Theory in the Age of Louis XIV: The 1683 'De optimo genere interpretandi' ('On the best kind of translating') of Pierre-Daniel Huet (1630-1721)" (St. Jerome Publishing, Manchester UK, 2002).
