= Tanneguy Le Fèvre =

French humanist and scholar (1615–1672)

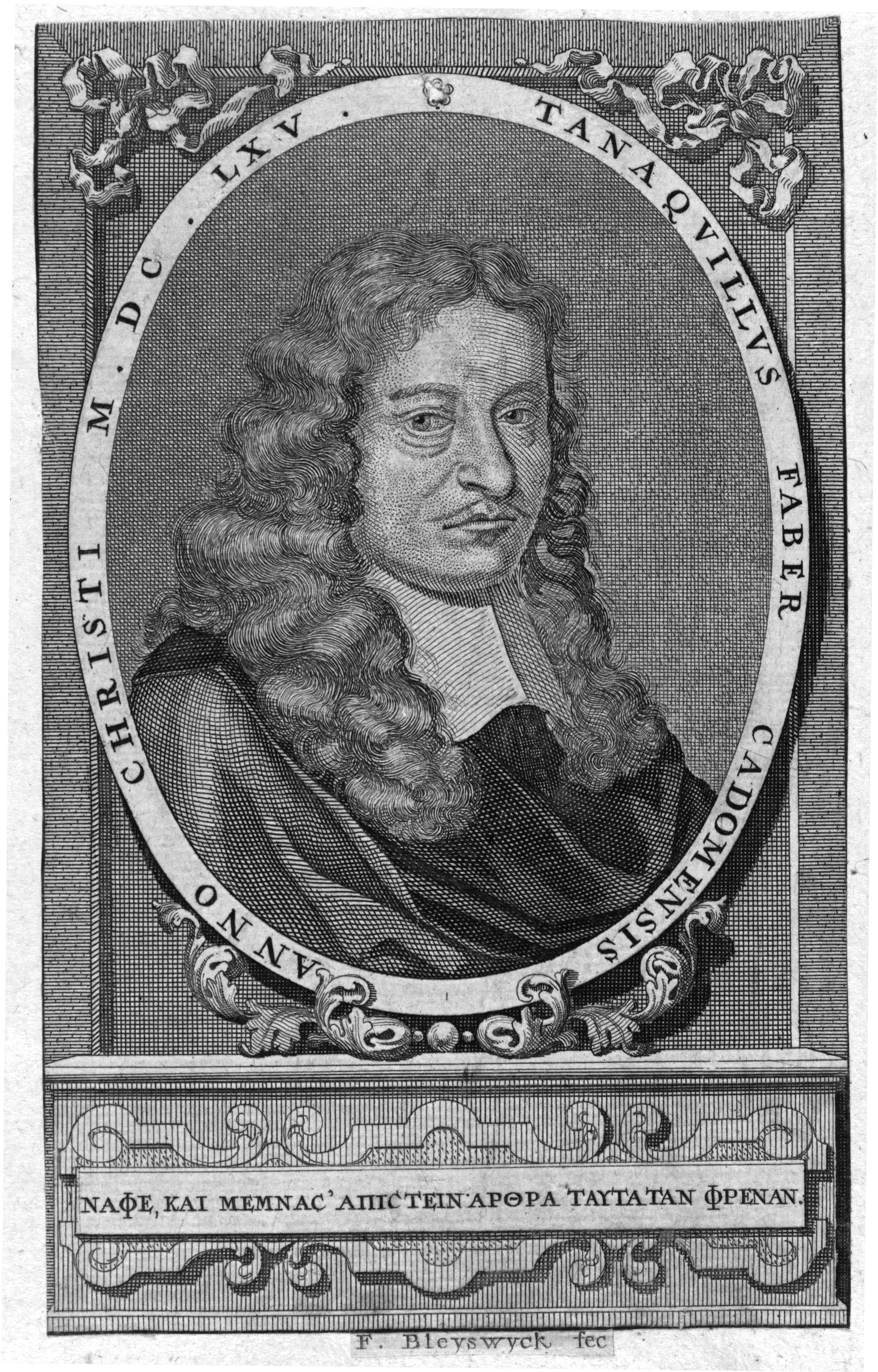
Engraving of Tanaquil Faber by Frans van Bleyswyck

Tanneguy Le Fèvre (Tanaquil[lus] Faber) (1615 – 12 September 1672) was a French classical scholar. He wrote many books, and translated numerous classical works. Somewhat unusual in this era, he educated his daughter Anne Dacier in Greek and Latin, and she subsequently became the notable classical scholar and translator better known as Madame Dacier.

== Life and work ==
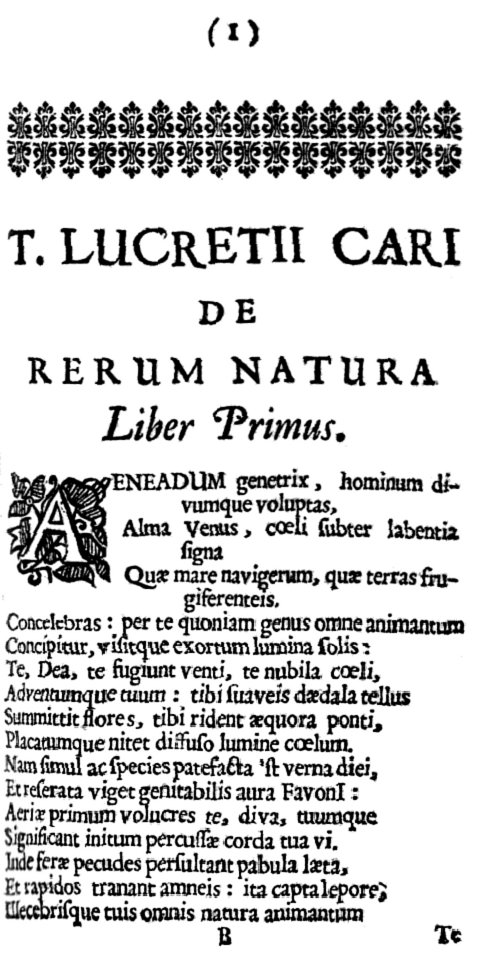
The start of Lucretius's De Rerum Natura, edited by Le Fèvre, 1675

Le Fèvre was born at Caen. After completing his studies in Paris, he was appointed by Cardinal Richelieu inspector of the printing-press at the Louvre. After Richelieu's death, he left Paris, joined the Reformed Church, and in 1651 obtained a professorship at the Academy of Saumur, which he filled with great success for nearly twenty years. His increasing ill-health and a certain moral laxity (as shown in his judgment on Sappho) led to a quarrel with the consistory, as a result of which he resigned his professorship. Several universities were eager to obtain his services, and he had accepted a post offered him by the elector palatine at Heidelberg, when he died suddenly. One of his children, Anne, became the distinguished classical scholar and translator Madame Dacier.

Le Fèvre was a highly cultivated man and a thorough classical scholar. He brought out editions of various Greek and Latin authors: Longinus, Anacreon and Sappho, Virgil, Horace, Lucretius and many others. His most important original works are: Les Vies des poètes Grecs (Lives of the Greek Poets, 1665); Méthode pour commencer les humanités Grecques et latines (Method to Start the Greek and Latin Humanities, 2nd ed., 1731), of which several English adaptations have appeared, such as Jenkin Thomas Philipps's A Compendious Way of Teaching Ancient and Modern Languages (1750); and Epistolae Criticae (1659).
