= Verrius Flaccus =

Roman lexicographer and writer (55 BC-20 AD)

Marcus Verrius Flaccus (c. 55 BC – AD 20) was a Roman grammarian and teacher who flourished under Augustus and Tiberius.

== Life ==
Flaccus was a freedman, and his manumitter has been identified with Verrius Flaccus, an authority on pontifical law, though, for chronological reasons, Veranius Flaccus, a writer on augury, has also been suggested. He gained such a reputation by his methods of instruction that he was summoned to court to bring up Gaius and Lucius, the grandsons of Augustus. He moved there with his whole school, and his salary was greatly increased on the condition that he took no fresh pupils. He died at an advanced age during the reign of Tiberius (Suetonius, De Grammaticis, 17), and a statue in his honour was erected at Praeneste, in a marble recess, with inscriptions from his Fasti Praenestini.

== Works ==
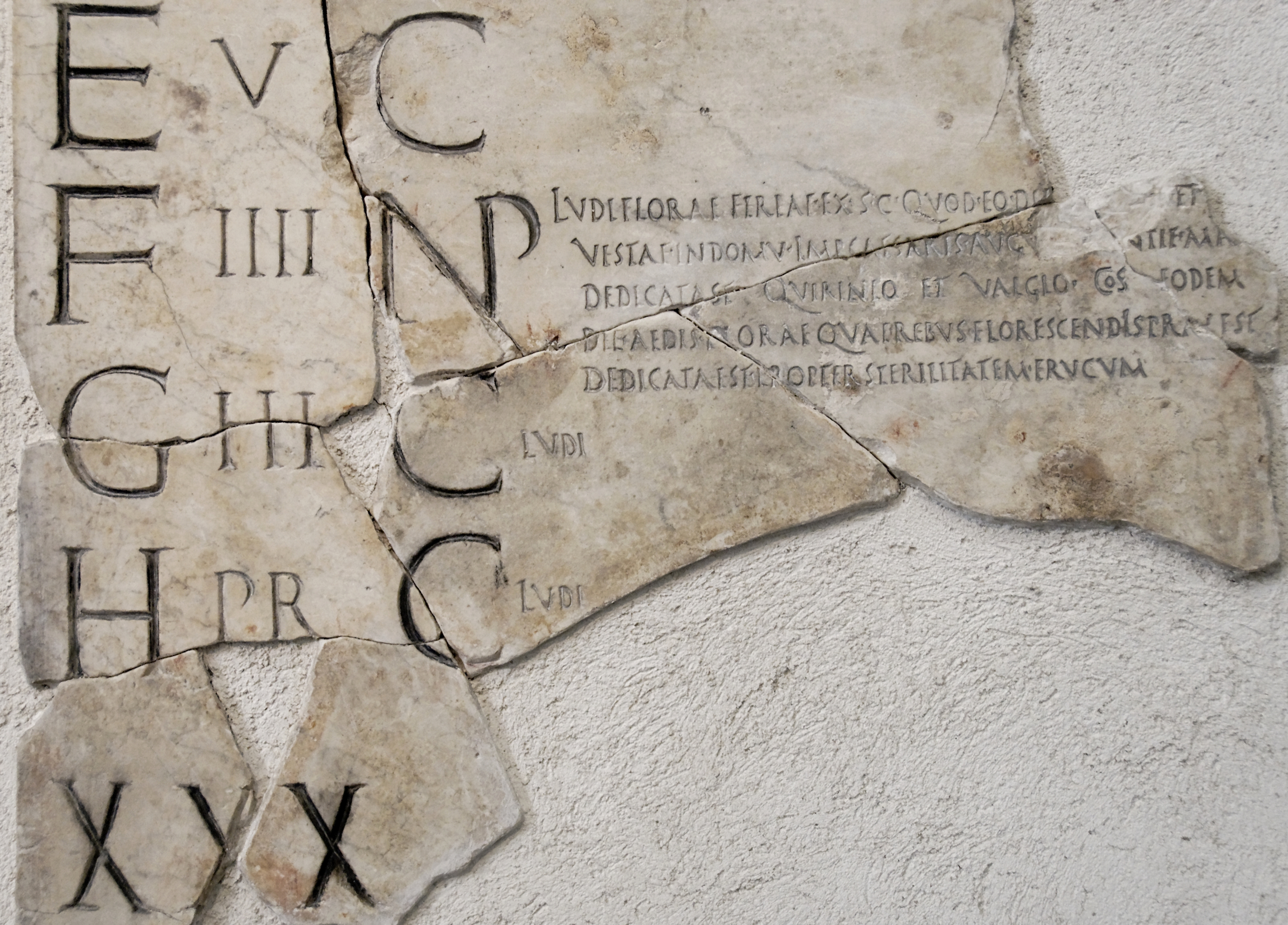
Section of the Fasti Praenestini

Flaccus was a distinguished philologist and antiquarian investigator. His most important work, De verborum significatu, was the first major alphabetical dictionary in Latin. Though only small fragments remain of the work, it served as the basis for Sextus Pompeius Festus's epitome, also called De verborum significatu. Festus's work was in turn abridged centuries later by Paul the Deacon for the library of Charlemagne. In 1771 some fragments of his calendar of Roman festivals engraved on marble and set up in the forum at Praeneste (the Fasti Praenestini) were discovered at some distance from the town itself in a Christian building of later date, and some consular fasti in the forum itself in 1778. The collection was subsequently increased by two new fragments.

Other lost works of Flaccus include:

- De Orthographia: De Obscuris Catonis, an elucidation of obscurities in the writings of Cato the Elder
- Saturnus, dealing with questions of Roman ritual
- Rerum memoria dignarum libri, an encyclopaedic work much used by Pliny the Elder
- Res Etruscae, probably on augury.

== See also ==
- Quintus Caecilius Epirota
