= Sextus Pompeius Festus =

2nd century AD Roman grammarian

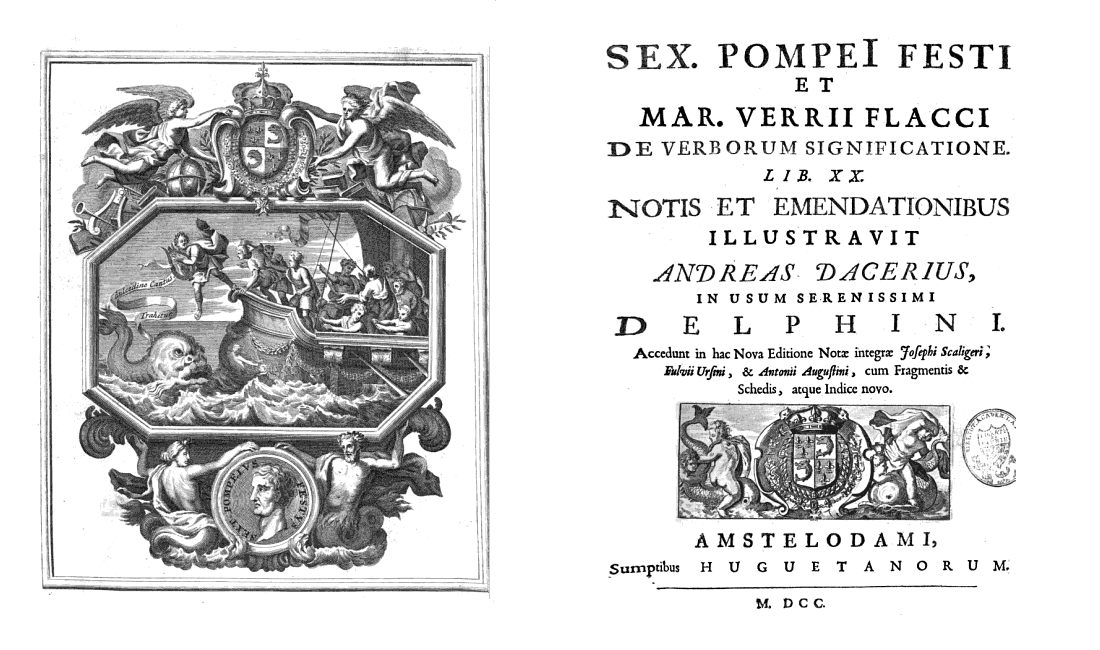
De verborum significatu

Sextus Pompeius Festus, usually known simply as Festus, was a Roman grammarian who probably flourished in the later 2nd century AD, perhaps at Narbo (Narbonne) in Gaul.

== Work ==
He made a 20-volume epitome of Verrius Flaccus's voluminous and encyclopedic treatise De verborum significatione. Flaccus had been a celebrated grammarian who flourished in the reign of Augustus. Festus gives the etymology as well as the meaning of many words, and his work throws considerable light on the language, mythology and antiquities of ancient Rome. He made a few alterations, and inserted some critical remarks of his own. He also omitted such ancient Latin words as had long been obsolete; these he apparently discussed in a separate work now lost, entitled Priscorum verborum cum exemplis. Even incomplete, Festus' lexicon reflects at second hand the enormous intellectual effort that had been made in the Augustan Age to put together information on the traditions of the Roman world, which was already in a state of flux and change.

Of Flaccus' work only a few fragments remain; of Festus' epitome, only one damaged, fragmentary manuscript. The remainder, further abridged, survives in a summary made at the close of the 8th century by Paul the Deacon.

The Festus Lexicon Project has summed up Paul's epitome of Festus' De Verborum Significatu as follows:

The text, even in its present mutilated state, is an important source for scholars of Roman history. It is a treasury of historical, grammatical, legal and antiquarian learning, providing sometimes unique evidence for the culture, language, political, social and religious institutions, deities, laws, lost monuments, and topographical traditions of ancient Italy.

== Manuscript ==
The 11th-century Codex Farnesianus at Naples is the sole surviving manuscript of Festus. It was rediscovered in 1436 at Speyer by the Venetian humanist and bishop Pietro Donato. When he found it, half of the manuscript was already missing, so that it only contains the alphabetized entries M-V, and not in perfect condition. During the 15th century it was scorched by fire and then disassembled by the antiquarian humanist Julius Pomponius Laetus.

The project of the collation and republication with translations of these fragmentary abridgments is being coordinated at University College London, with several objectives: to make this information available in usable form, to stimulate debate on Festus and on the Augustan antiquarian tradition upon which he drew, and to enrich and to renew studies on Roman life, about which Festus provides essential information.
