= Antoine Garaby de La Luzerne =

French author and moralist

Antoine de Garaby, sieur de Pierrepont, de La Luzerne et d'Étienville (28 October 1617 – 4 July 1679) was a French moralist.

Garaby de La Luzerne was born in the family manor of La Besnardière at Montchaton near Coutances. He was the son of Bernard de Garaby and Françoise de Pierrepont, the sister of Hervé de Pierrepont, commander of the city and fortress of Granville for the king. Although diminutive, unattractive and malformed, his keen intelligence, amenities, and the subtleties of his mind, nonetheless made him an attractive character for nature had endowed him with the qualities of mind and heart while denying him physical beauty.

Garaby received his early education at home, under Francis Dyens, to whose memory he dedicated two couplets and a few lines of Latin prose. He then went on to study eloquence at the University of Caen, under Professor Antoine Halley with whom he was to remain in friendly terms until the end of his life. Amongst his classmates were, the theologian, orator, poet and humanist, Guillaume Marcel and Georges de Brébeuf, the translator into French of Lucan's Pharsalia.

Graced with a keen taste for literature, he started to compose, soon after finishing his classical studies. Huet commented him that "He loved literary men with a passion [and] he made them into his major friends." Aside from Huet himself, Garaby was acquainted with several scholars of his time, like Voiture, Chapelain et Ménage, Sarrazin, Moisant de Brieux, Jacques de Callières, Nicolas Bourbon, Pierre Halley, Jacques Du Chevreuil, etc.

Described as "a kind of Norman Montaigne", Garaby did not apply himself, nor did he determine to become a successful man of letters. Rather than being a career, literature was simply the exercise of the gift of intelligence, the taste and imagination of the gentleman who only sought the pleasures of study for its own sake. Huet concurred: "He had more genius for letters than achievement. For although he possessed enough Latin, he did not have much use of the ancient writers, and his active mind made composing easier and more pleasant than reading and polishing. Hence one finds more fertility than purity, clarity and elegance in his Latin prose collection of Christian, political and moral sentiments or in his French poetry."

Garaby remained with his father on their property of Trois-Monts, fairly close to Caen, long enough for his former professor to dub it his Parnassus. There he composed his French and Latin poems and his satires. Garaby's name is also associated with the foundation, along with Samuel Bochart, Pierre-Daniel Huet and Jean Regnault de Segrais, of the Royal Academy of Belles-Lettres of Caen.

After Hervé de Pierrepont, Garaby's maternal uncle, died on 18 August 1662, he inherited his property and names, to be called from then on "Garaby de Pierrepont de La Luzerne Étienville". This plenteous bequest made him think of entering into matrimony. By and through Madame de Matignon's benevolent intervention, Garaby soon wedded Anne de Vassé, of an ancient and noble family in Maine. Antoine Halley wrote, on this occasion, a wedding song celebrating the bride's beauty, spirit, and dowry. No children came of this union.

Having established his home in Étienville, where he spent the last years of his life. Huet also described Garaby de La Luzerne as "true and faithful to the duties of friendship, generous and kind, and very good company." Upon his death on 4 July 1679 in L'Isle-Marie, at the age of sixty-two, he was buried in the middle of the choir of the Étienville church. One of his descendants, the abbé de Garaby, a former professor of philosophy at the College of Saint-Brieuc, and author of several books of philosophy and morality, gave Father Leloup, the curé of Étienville, a small marble plaque engraved with the following praise of his forebear:

Dear relative, I did not get to know you down here;
As time and place estranged us;
But I hope to join and embrace you in heaven,
Once I shall be born into eternity.

== Works ==
- (in French) Satires inédites, Ed. & intr. Eugène de Robillard de Beaurepaire, Rouen, E. Cagniard, 1888.
- (in Latin) Eminentissimi cardinalis dvcis Richelii elogium funebre, Parisiis, pr. P. Targa, 1642, 1642.
- (in French) Sentiments chrétiens, politiques et moraux. Maximes d'état et de religion illustrées de paragraphes selon l'ordre des quadrins, Caen, Thomas Jolly; Paris, Targa, 1641, in-12, 146 pages.
- (in French) Les Essais poëtiques du sieur de la Luzerne , Paris, Veuve François Targa, 1642.
- (in Latin) Miscellanea, Cadomi, Apud Marinvm Yvon, 1663.
- (in French) Recueil de ballades et sonnets présentés au Puy de l'immaculée Conception, dédié à messire Pompone-de-Bellièvre, in-4°, [S.d.].

== Sources ==
- Travers, Julien (1856). Annuaire du Département de la Manche. Vol. 28. Saint-Lô: J. Élie. pp. 65–78.
