= Laurence Womock =

English bishop

Laurence Womock (also Lawrence Womach or Womack) (1612–1686) was an English bishop. He is best known for his controversial writings, some of which were signed Tilenus, after Daniel Tilenus, expressing his hostility to Calvinism in general, and the Synod of Dort in particular.

== Biography ==
=== Background ===
Lawrence Womack, a namesake of his grandfather, was born 12 May 1612 at Lopham, Norfolk, England where his father, Charles Womack, was rector. Lawrence's brother William became estranged from the family and emigrated to Virginia, United States of America in the 1630s where he became a Quaker.

=== Education ===
Lawrence graduated BA from Corpus Christi College, Cambridge in 1632, and MA in 1636. He became chaplain to William Paget, 5th Baron Paget.

== Ecclesiastical career ==
Lawrence had a benefice (an office endowed with fixed capital assets that provide a living through the revenue from such assets) in the west of England, where he attained fame by his preaching.

He was published by the royalist printer Richard Royston. Along with Thomas Pierce and Jeremy Taylor, he was one of the Arminian clerics attacked by Edward Bagshaw the younger and Henry Hickman.

=== Period of relative obscurity ===
Little is known of him from 1648 to 1660. This corresponds to a revolutionary period in England that included the overthrow of the monarchy, the outbreak of the Second English Civil War in 1648, followed by the execution of King Charles I in 1649, and the short-lived Commonwealth of England. A political crisis that followed the death of Cromwell in 1658 resulted in the restoration of the monarchy. King Charles II restored the crown in 1660. Charles's English parliament enacted laws known as the Clarendon Code, designed to shore up the position of the re-established Church of England.

=== Further enhancement of career ===
At this point, Lawrence Womack returned to prominence, and obtained a prebend (a stipend drawn from the endowment or revenues of an Anglican cathedral or church by a presiding member of the clergy) in Hereford Cathedral in 1660. On the Restoration of 1660 he was made Archdeacon of Suffolk on Dec. 8th, Prebendary of Ely, and Doctor of Divinity in 1661.

Like his grandfather of the same name, Lawrence Womack was a Rector in the Church of England and in 1683 was consecrated Bishop of St. David's. He was noted for his publications supporting the liturgy and was known for having a fine collection of books. He replied to Edmund Calamy's 1662 sermon Eli trembling for fear of the Ark.

He became Bishop of St David's in 1683.

== Marriage and family ==
Lawrence was married three times. By his first marriage, Lawrence had at least one son, Edward. The second marriage, in West Bradford, Nov. 18, 1668, to Anne, daughter of John Hill and widow of Edward Alymer, of Claydon County, Suffolk. Ann was buried at Horringer Suffolk, 1669. Next he married at Brideford on 18 November 1668 a woman called Anne Aylmer of Bury and they had a daughter, Anne, who died in 1685. Third marriage, at St. Bartholomew, the Less, London, on April 25, 1670, was to Katherine Corbett, of Norwick, aged 40. She was still living in 1697. Lawrence Womack and Katherine Corbett had a son named John Richard Womack born in 1670 in Suffolk, England. John Richard Womack migrated to America and died in 1738 in Prince Edward County, Virginia.

== Death and memorial ==
Lawrence Womack died in Westminster, March 12, 1686; buried at St. Margaret's Church, London, where there is a tablet to his memory. The Anglican church of St. Margaret is situated in the grounds of Westminster Abbey on Parliament Square next to the “Big Ben” clock tower, and is known affectionately as the parish church of the Houses of Commons. When Elizabeth I re-founded the Abbey as a collegiate church in 1560 she maintained its exemption from episcopal authority and made her new foundation a ‘royal peculiar’, subject to the authority of the Sovereign as Visitor.

Lawrence left his books and property to his nephew, Lawrence Womack, Rector of Castor, of Yarmouth.

== Works ==
- Beaten Oyle for the Lamps of the Sanctuarie (1641)
- Sober Sadness (1643)
- The examination of Tilenus before the triers (1658)
- Arcana dogmatum anti-remonstrantium. Or the Calvinists cabinet unlock'd (1659)
- The Dressing Up of the Crown (1660)
- The Solemn League and Covenant arraigned and condemned (1661)
- The result of false principles, or, Error convicted by its own evidence (1661)
- Pulpit-conceptions, popular-deceptions, or, The grand debate resumed (1662)
- Aron-bimnucha: or, an Antidote to cure the Calamites of their Trembling for fear of the Ark (1663)
- Anti-Boreale (1663)
- Conformity re-asserted in an echo to R.S. (1664)
- Moses and Aaron, the king and the priest (1675)
- The verdict upon the dissenters plea, occasioned by their Melius inquirendum (1681)
- Two letters containing a further justification of the Church of England against the dissenters (1682) first letter attributed to Thomas Pierce
- Suffragium Protestantium (1683)

Church of England titles
| Preceded by William Thomas | Bishop of St David's; 1683–1686 | Succeeded by John Lloyd |
