= John Durel =

Anglican cleric from Jersey

John Durel (1625–1683), John Durell, or Jean Durel, was a cleric from Jersey, known for his apologetical writing on behalf of the Church of England. He became Dean of Windsor in 1677. His French translation of the 1662 Book of Common Prayer was used frequently on the Channel Islands through to the 20th century and his 1670 Latin translation had been authorized by Convocation.

== Early life ==
Durel was born at St Helier, Jersey, the son of Jean le Vavaseur dit Durel and his wife, Susanne Effard, daughter of Nicolas Effard. He matriculated at St Alban Hall, Oxford and entered Merton College, Oxford, in 1640. When Oxford was garrisoned by Charles I at the beginning of the English Civil War, he left for France. There he studied at Caen, where he proceeded M.A. at the Collège du Bois in 1644. He then studied divinity at the protestant University of Saumur.

In 1647 Durel returned to Jersey as chaplain to Lieutenant-governor George Carteret, and participated in its defence. He was sent by Carteret on a mission to Paris in early summer of 1651, and at the private chapel of Sir Richard Browne, 1st Baronet, of Deptford, the resident English ambassador in Paris, was ordained deacon and priest, on Trinity Sunday, by Thomas Sydserff, the Bishop of Galloway, in company with Daniel Brevint. After the Battle of Worcester in September 1651, a Commonwealth fleet under Robert Blake sailed for Jersey. Jean Poingdestre and Durel were sent as messengers to the exiled Charles II in late October, at which point the Parliamentary forces had taken the whole island except Elizabeth Castle, and Castle Cornet on Guernsey was still holding out. They returned with the king's order to Carteret to make terms. Carteret signed a surrender to James Heane on 15 December.

== In exile ==
Durel moved to France after the fall of Jersey, and resided briefly at St Malo. He officiated a short time at Caen in place of Samuel Bochart, and after declining an offer from William VI, Landgrave of Hesse-Kassel became chaplain for eight years to the Duc de la Force. In Normandy he met Jean-Maximilien de Baux, seigneur de l'Angle (fr:Jean-Maximilien de Langle), a like-minded Huguenot minister, who became his father-in-law some years later.

During his time in Guyenne with the Duc, Durel kept abreast of English politics and polemics. He wrote in May 1654 to William Edgeman, secretary to Sir Edward Hyde. He mentioned then an intention, apparently unfulfilled, to reply to John Milton's Eikonoklastes. His name has been brought up in relation with a reply to Milton's Defensio pro Populo Anglicano of 1651, along with that of Dirk Graswinckel. The pseudonymous "Ambiorix Ariovistus" who wrote it is now taken to be Henrik Ernst (1603–1665), a German tutor at the Sorø Academy. Milton's The Reason of Church-Government Urged against Prelaty of 1642 was against Certain Briefe Treatises (Oxford, 1641), a collection of tracts of which one was identified by James Smith Candlish to David Masson, in the 19th century, as by "John Durel" rather than John Dury; Lewalski disagrees.

Early in 1660, as the restoration of the House of Stuart seemed likely, Brevint, Durel and Philippe Le Couteur, all from Jersey, were recruited by Sir Robert Moray, on behalf of the Earl of Lauderdale, to solicit letters of support from leading Huguenots. By March they had considerable success, and some of the letters were published, with an impact on English Presbyterians such as Richard Baxter. The Jersey group were then asked to set up a synod at Charenton, by Madame de Turenne, again through Moray: the royalists here followed a plan of George Morley to win over Protestant ministers. Such a synod met with legal problems, and it is unclear whether it occurred. But again letters of support were gained. Whatever the outcome for Charenton, Durel and other Jersey clergy did attend shortly a synod at Caen, undermining Huguenot support for English Presbyterians intent on continuing their opposition to the Church of England.

== The French Church, London ==
In 1660 Durel returned to England. That year he helped set up the recognised French Church, London, in a chapel in the grounds of the Savoy Hospital (not the later Savoy Chapel). There was an existing French congregation from the Protectorate, and Jean D'Espagne had preached to them in the chapel of Somerset House; which Henrietta Maria claimed back. Charles II granted use of the chapel, subject to the right to appoint the minister, to be instituted by the Bishop of London, and the liturgical use of the Book of Common Prayer.

Durel was appointed minister of the French Church with a royal pension, once Daniel Brevint had been found a living. On 14 January 1661 he preached his first sermon there, and the liturgy of the Church of England was read in French for the first time. That year Durel heard the nuncupative will of his friend John Colladon.

Belonging to a "conformist" group of Francophone clergy, who wished to reconcile the Church of England with Huguenot and Reformed practice generally, Durel had as allies Isaac Basire and Samuel Brevint, tolerant of episcopacy, and Peter Du Moulin. Among the opposing voices was Jean Gailhard, who had arrived in England c.1660, and whose sympathies lay with the Puritans. An argument going back to John Calvin, used by Durel, was the "five centuries" of the primitive church and Christian fathers that could be accepted as a basis for the Church of England's posture.

The conformist position was not liked by all of Durel's congregation: but the chapel was close to Whitehall Palace, and the trade-off between religious preferences and political positioning was successful. The congregation of D'Espagne had met at Durham House, and contained nobility and gentry. There was an existing Huguenot and Genevan Calvinist church on Threadneedle Street, some way to the east, in the City of London: this new "Anglo-Gallican" church, La Savoie, was viewed there as an unwelcome rival. On the other hand, Protestant leaders in continental Europe were pleased.

Rapid preferment then came for Durel. He was recommended by the king to Brian Duppa, the Bishop of Winchester, in October 1661, for the reversion of the sinecure held by James Hamilton, Bishop of Galloway. He succeeded John Earle as royal chaplain to Charles II in 1662. He was made rector of Overton, Hampshire in 1663. In 1664 he became canon of St George's Chapel, Windsor Castle, in 1665 prebendary of North Aulton in Salisbury Cathedral.

== Comprehension ==
The outcome of the Savoy Conference of the first half of 1661, held on the same site as Durel's chapel, led in 1662 to the exodus of non-conformists from the Church of England now called the Great Ejection. During the 1660s some of the Presbyterian ministers involved still hoped for "comprehension": inclusion of their congregations within the Church, in good standing. The Presbyterian leaders Richard Baxter and Thomas Manton pursued this goal, at cross-purposes with John Owen who aimed for religious toleration for Presbyterians. With Jacques Couët-du Vivier, minister at Courcelles and grandson of Paul Ferry (1612–1669), minister at Metz, Durel went to observe Manton at his church St Paul's, Covent Garden in 1661. Manton read the Prayer Book liturgy at length, and the congregation received it well. After 1662, however, Manton was a conventicle preacher in the London area.

Bosher's account of the period 1660 to 1662, from the point of view of the returning bishops, argues for continuity with Laudian values:

- At the Savoy Conference, the Church position was at the beginning flexible.
- The religious uniformity sought was for ceremonial and liturgy, not theology.
- The expulsion of Puritans was not an intended consequence of the Conference, as began to be argued in the late 17th century.
- The Act of Uniformity 1662 was a product of the House of Commons.

Richard Baxter had a Latin letter of April 1660 from Raymond Gaches (1615–1668), minister at Castres and one of Daniel Brevint's contacts in Moray's campaign. It was written at the request of Anna Mackenzie, who knew both Baxter and Gaches, and gave assurances from personal observation on Charles II's religious views. Baxter discussed possible ways of answering Durel's apologetics: but he did not publish, and the sustained Presbyterian criticism began only in the 1670s. He knew in advance (1669) that Louis du Moulin was planning such a work: in Latin, it saw du Moulin imprisoned.

== Later life ==
In 1668 Durel was installed prebendary of Durham Cathedral with a rich donative. In February 1670 he was created D.D. at Oxford. In 1677 he was made registrar of the Order of the Garter, and in the same year he was appointed dean of Windsor and consequently of Wolverhampton. The fine living of Witney, Oxfordshire, was soon afterwards granted him by the king, his chief recommendation to King Charles being that "he was not only a good scholar but a perfect courtier."

Durel died 8 June 1683, and is buried in the north aisle adjoining Windsor Chapel choir.

== Works ==
Durel's major work was published in 1669, in vindication of the English church against schismatics, and entitled Sanctae ecclesiae Anglicanae schismaticorum criminationes, London, pp. cxiv and 538. It was dedicated to Charles II, and a second issue was printed in 1672 as Historia rituum sanctae ecclesiae Anglicanae. Presbyterians retorted by Bonasus Vapulans, or some Castigations given to Mr. John Durell (1672) by Henry Hickman, republished as The Nonconformists Vindicated (1679); and Patronus Bonæ Fidei (1672), attributed to Louis du Moulin.

Durel published also:

- His master's thesis, Theoremata philosophiae rationalis, moralis, naturalis et supernaturalis, Caen, 1644.
- No. 6 (14 March 1647) of the Disputationes de Argumentis, published by Josué de la Place, Saumur, 1649. Durel had been awarded a B.D. by Saumur Academy, in 1647.
- Sermon prononcé en l'église françoise (1661), translated as The Liturgy of the Church of England Asserted (1662), dedicated to James Butler, 1st Duke of Ormond. The text was 1 Corinthians 11:16.

A View of the Government and Publick Worship of God in the Reformed Churches beyond the Seas (1662) was answered in a work once attributed to Henry Hickman, Apologia pro Ministris in Anglia (attribution rejected by Gibson in the Dictionary of National Biography). In it, Durel mentions an ambition to collect the liturgies of all the Protestant churches. It contains positive comment on the Unitas Fratrum (Moravians), then under threat in Central Europe, and supported by John Amos Comenius. Durel, and also Herbert Thorndike, were interested in the Unitas as a Protestant church with bishops. Durel's Protestant ecumenism was designed for arguments based on the Elizabethan settlement, and against the English Dissenters following the Act of Uniformity 1662. It allowed for such comparisons with Protestant churches outside England.

=== Translation of the Book of Common Prayer ===
Needing the Book of Common Prayer in French in a hurry to begin his London ministry, Durel used the 1616 version by Pierre Delaune or de Laune, reprinted in an edition that quickly sold out. It has been commented that "Durel's temporary edition of 1661 shares with the Maltese Prayer Book of 1845 the distinction of being the rarest of all the foreign-language versions of the English Liturgy."

The king then asked Durel to translate the work again into French, and ordered the book to be used in the parish churches of Guernsey and Jersey and at the Savoy chapel. The Savoy Conference of 1661 had made a revision, Durel produced a translation of the 1662 prayer book. It was closely based on the century-old translation by Francis Philippe, made for Thomas Goodrich. The right of sole printing was granted 6 October 1662, and the Bishop of London's chaplain sanctioned it in 1663, but Durel's work did not appear until 1667, as La Liturgie, c'est à dire Le Formulaire des Prières publiques. White Kennett stated that this translation was accepted by the Reformed church in France. In the 1680s questions were raised about its consistency with the English original.

The 1662 Book of Common Prayer was given to John Earle, Bishop of Salisbury and John Pearson for translation into Latin. Earle died, and Pearson and his replacement John Dolben became bishops: the completion of the translation then passed to Durel. Earle's portion was lost in the Great Fire of London, but a portion of Dolben's manuscript was found. Durel's work, of which he calls himself editor, was published in 1670 as Liturgia, seu Liber Precum Communium et Administrationis Sacramentorum (for the first time "communium" is used, for the previous "publicarum"). There were at least seven editions down to 1703.

== Family ==
Durel married in 1664, at Rouen, Marie de Baux, daughter of Jean-Maximilien de Baux, seigneur de l'Angle.

== Notes ==
=== Attribution ===
- This article incorporates text from a publication now in the public domain: Stephen, Leslie, ed. (1888). "Durel, John". Dictionary of National Biography. Vol. 16. London: Smith, Elder & Co.
