= Henry Hickman =

English ejected minister and controversialist

Henry Hickman (died 1692) was an English ejected minister and controversialist.

== Life ==
A native of Worcestershire, he was educated at St Catharine Hall, Cambridge, where he proceeded B.A. in 1648. At the end of 1647, he entered Magdalen Hall, Oxford, and the next year obtained by favour of the parliamentary visitors a demyship and subsequently a fellowship of Magdalen College. After graduating M.A. on 14 March 1649, he was licensed as a preacher and officiated at St Aldate's Church in Oxford and afterwards at Brackley in Northamptonshire. On 29 May 1658, he was admitted B.D.

On being ejected from his fellowship after the Restoration, he went to Holland. He afterwards returned to England and for some time taught logic and philosophy to pupils near Stourbridge in Worcestershire, but went again to Holland and preached for several years in the English church at Leyden. On 18 April 1675, he entered as a medical student at Leyden University. He died at Leyden in 1692.

== Works ==
He wrote in defence of nonconformity and had fierce controversies with Thomas Pierce, dean of Salisbury, John Durel, Peter Heylyn, Matthew Scrivener, Laurence Womack and other churchmen. His writings are:

- 1. ‘Πατρο-σκολαστικο-δικαίωσις, or a Justification of the Fathers and Schoolmen: shewing that they are not selfe-condemned for denying the positivity of sin. … Being an Answer to so much of … T. Pierce's Book called Αὐτοκατάκρισις as doth relate to the foresaid opinion,’ Oxford, 1658; 2nd edit. 1659. John Durel, in his ‘Sanctæ Ecclesiæ Anglicanæ Vindiciæ,’ 1669 (ch. ii. pp. 100–1), asserts that this book was plagiarised from various authors.
- ‘Πόθεν ζιζαγια [i.e. ζιζάνια], sive Concio [on Matt. xiii. 27, the reference is wrongly given as iii. 27] de Hæresium Origine, Latine habita ad Academicos Oxonienses, 12 Aprilis pro inchoando Termino. Adjicitur brevis refutatio Tileni,’ Oxford, 1659. Tilenus found a defender in Womack.
- ‘A Review of the Certamen Epistolare betwixt P. Heylin and H. Hickman. Wherein the exceptions of the Dr. against Mr. H.'s arguments are all taken off. … Also a Reply to Mr. Pierce his late virulent Letter to the aforesaid Dr. By Theophilus Churchman,’ 12mo, London, 1659.
- ‘Laudensium Apostasia: or a Dialogue in which is shewn that some Divines risen up in our church since the greatness of the late Archbishop are in sundry points of great moment quite fallen off from the Doctrine received in the Church of England,’ London, 1660.
- ‘Χειροθεσία τοῦ πρεσβυτερίου, or a Letter to a Friend tending to prove, i. That valid Ordination ought not to be repeated, ii. That valid Ordination by Presbyters is valid; with an appendix containing some animadversions on J. Humfrey's discourse concerning re-ordination, by R. A.,’ London, 1661. In spite of the initials R. A., ‘Hickman was supposed by many learned men to be the author’.
- ‘Apologia pro ministris in Anglia, vulgo Non-Conformistis, Anno 1662, Aug. 24 … ejectis,’ ‘Eleutheropolis,’ 1664; 2nd edition (1665), written under the pseudonym of ‘Irenæus Eleutherius.’ Durel replied in his ‘Vindiciæ,’ mentioned above.
- ‘The Believer's Duty towards the Spirit, and the Spirit's Office towards Believers’ (anon.), London, 1665; another edition 1700.
- ‘Bonasus Vapulans’ (anon.), London, 1672, against J. Durel.
- ‘Historia Quinq-Articularis Exarticulata; or Animadversions on Doctor Heylin's Quinquarticular History,’ 2nd ed. London, 1674.

In 1660, ‘M. O., Bachelour of Arts,’ published ‘Fratres in Malo, or the Matchless Couple, represented in the Writings of Mr. E. Bagshaw and Mr. H. Hickman.’
