= Louis Le Blanc de Beaulieu =

French Reformed Minister (1614–1675)

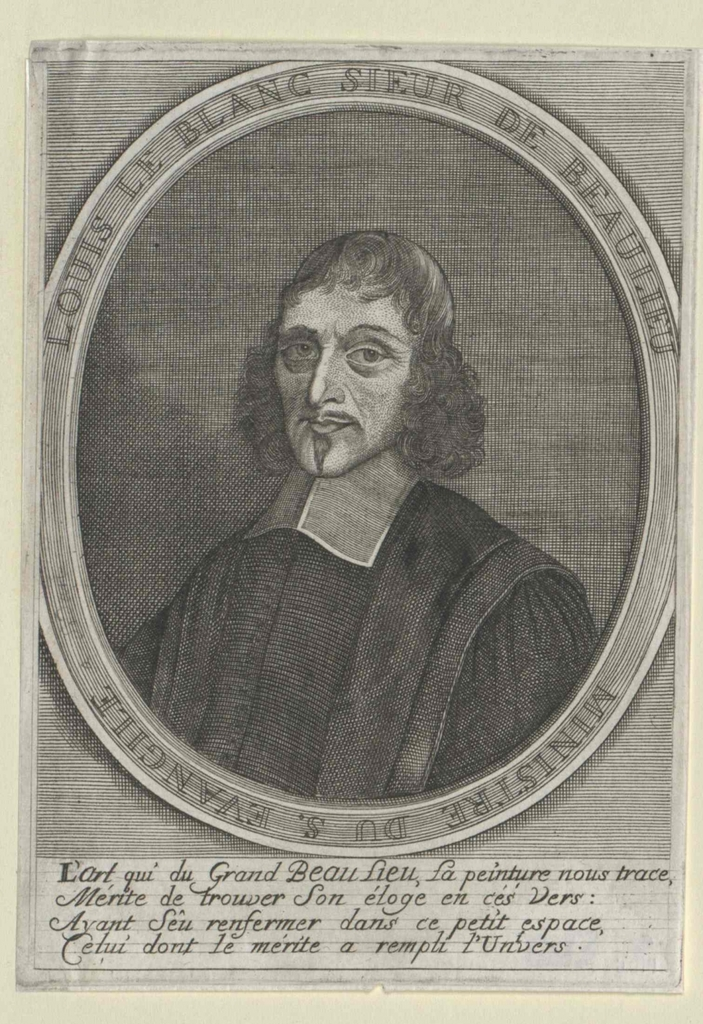
- Portrait c. 1550-1850
- Born: July 1614; Longvilliers, Île-de-France, France
- Died: 28 January 1675 (aged 60); Sedan, Grand Est, France
- Occupations: Academy of Sedan, Minister, Professor
- Theological work
- Tradition or movement: Reformed; Huguenot
- Main interests: Theology, Ecclesial Unity, Preaching

Louis Le Blanc de Beaulieu (July 1614 – 28 January 1675) was a French Protestant minister and professor of theology at the Calvinist Academy of Sedan in the 17th century. He was noted for his scholarly theological works, particularly his collected theses, and for his conciliatory approach to religious differences between Roman Catholics and Protestants.

== Early life ==
Sources differ on the circumstances of Le Blanc's early life. According to some sources he was born in 1614 in Beaulieu a small city in Lower Limousin. However, other sources including the Nouvelle biographie générale places his birthplace in Plessy Marli, Longvilliers now known as Château Plessis-Mornay or Câteau' à longvilliers where his father, Jaques Le Blanc served as a minister. His burial record from 1675 lists him as a native of Senlis.

The Le Blanc family had several notable members in the French Protestant church. Louis' grandfather, Étienne Le Blanc, had held important positions at the court of Louis XIII, having successively served as secretary to the king, royal counselor, and controller general of finance under François I and Henri II. He achieved recognition in the Republic of Letters through his work "Traité des Orgues du Chrétien" (Paris, 1544).

== Career ==
Le Blanc served as a pastor in Sedan for over thirty years. He was appointed professor of theology at the Academy of Sedan in 1644, filling the chair that had been vacant since 1636 following the departure of Des Marêts. Prior to this appointment, he had already been serving as a pastor in Sedan for several years. According to historical records from the academy, Le Blanc served as rector of the academy on multiple occasions and was a member of the council of moderators which oversaw the governance of the institution.

During his tenure, Le Blanc was involved in numerous academic affairs, but most notably was his appointment by the marshal of Fabert and later Turenne to facilitate a plan to bring Roman Catholics and Protestants into union. These negotiations however did not succeed.

Le Blanc appears to have enjoyed considerable prestige within the Protestant church. In 1637, the Synod of Alençon appointed him to a commission charged with organizing the explanations given by Amyraut, Testard, and others, and with preparing a report on their doctrines for the following national synod.

During his tenure at Sedan, Le Blanc was involved in numerous academic affairs, including the dispute over the Hebrew professorship between ministers Colvil and Levasseur, where he had to recuse himself due to his familial relationship with Colvil.

In 1641, along with other ministers and elders of the consistory, Le Blanc took an oath of fidelity to the King of France. He gained a reputation for his theological discernment and clarity of thought, being described by Pierre Nicole "a precise man with a clear mind, who had an extraordinary talent for penetrating the sentiments of authors, and for explaining the differences with the utmost precision."

== Death ==
Le Blanc died in Sedan on February 23, 1675, at the age of 61, according to the Nouvelle biographie générale. Other sources dates his death to the month of February 1675 as well. His death certificate places the date on the 28th of January 1675.
