= Antoine Halley =

French professor and poet

Antoine Halley (1593 – 3 June 1675) was a French professor and poet.

Halley was born at Bazenville near Bayeux. A professor of belles-lettres and Principal of the Collège du Bois, at the University of Caen, he succeeded Antoine Gosselin and distinguished himself from the age of twenty-two, by his eloquence and the brilliance of his teaching. He taught Latin poetry at the University of Caen, for nearly forty years. He cultivated Latin and French poetry and won the prize of the Immaculate Conception time and again so that the Académie des Sciences, Arts et Belles-Lettres de Caen pleaded with him to quit competing.

Halley had ties with Charles de la Rue and Huet, the bishop of Avranches. The latter urged him to publish his poems. Huet, in his Origines de Caen, hailed him as mentor: "I am obliged to give this testimony of gratitude to Mr. Halley. I deem it one of the greatest joys of my life to have been his disciple at his home for five years. He trained my mind, he refined my taste, he gave me an understanding of good authors. He taught me an infinite number of rare and curious things." Halley, in the meantime, professed no less esteem for his former student, sending him a poem a propos his book De Interpretatione. He also published a Traité sur la grammaire latine, at Caen in 1652.

His collection of Poems is dedicated to the Duke of Montausier, the tutor of the dauphin and governor of Normandy. Cadomus, a play in which he paid tribute to all the literary celebrities born in his city, from Nicole Oresme, tutor of Charles V, to Pierre Patrix, the favorite poet of Gaston d'Orleans, is amongst his best.

When the chancellor Pierre Séguier, who had subdued the Harelle revolt of 1640 with undue harshness, made his way to Caen, Halley sent him far too flattering a couplet for the occasion. In 1642, he thanked him for having increased the privileges of the Académie de Caen, founded by Moisant de Brieux. He addressed the Dauphin a long letter in Latin verse reminding him about the origins of the kings of France and celebrating the Trojan kings Dardanus, Erichthonius, Tros, Ilus, Laomedon and Priam, the supposed ancestors of Louis XIV.

A few letters written at Lisieux by Jean-Pierre Camus, the bishop of Belley have been found in his works. One of them is dated thus: "At Lisieux, on November 22nd, the day of St. Cecilia, patron saint of music, sister of poetry.

When the Duchesse de Longueville came to Caen in 1648, Halley was commissioned to compose the verses that decorated the tables placed at city's expense on the way of the Duchess and her two children. In 1649, during the famous Jobelins and Uranists Quarrel, Aubert, the princess' chaplain, sent him the Voiture and Benserade's sonnets, to get his opinion, as the French Academy had refused to get involved. That grave matter had been evoked before the very king, queen and princes, who were not able to settle it. It was then agreed that it was necessary to submit it to Halley whose decision would be final. The latter found in favor of Voiture against Benserade, i.e. in favor of the Duchesse de Longueville.

Pierre Bayle has proclaimed Halley to be "one of the greatest poets of his century"; even if his French poetry is weak, his Latin rhymes lack neither ease nor elegance. La Rue, Huet, Gilles Ménage, Lesueur de Pétiville, Pierre Cailly, and Michel Gonfrey have composed Latin verses in his honor.

== Works ==
- Antonii Hallæi, regii eloquentiæ professoria et Musei Sylvani (le collège du Bois), gymnasiarcha in Academia Cadomensi, Opvsculm Miscellanea (in Latin). Cadomi: JJ. Cavelier. 1675.
- Traité sur la Grammaire Latine (in French). Caen. 1652.

== Sources ==
- Hoefer, Ferdinand (1858). Nouvelle Biographie générale. Vol. 23. Paris: Firmin Didot. pp. 187–88.
