= Moisant =

Moisant may refer to:

- John Bevins Moisant (1868–1910), American aviation pioneer and brother of Matilde
- Matilde E. Moisant (1878–1964), American aviation pioneer and sister of John
- Moisant Aviation School, an institution founded by John and his brother Alfred, also known as the Moisant Flying School
  - Moisant's International Aviators, a flying circus hosted by the school
- Moisant Field, the original name of Louis Armstrong New Orleans International Airport (also known as Moisant Army Airfield during World War II, and as Moisant Airport)
- Jacques Moisant de Brieux (1611–1674), French historian and poet
