= Jean-Baptiste du Hamel =

French cleric and natural philosopher

Jean-Baptiste Du Hamel
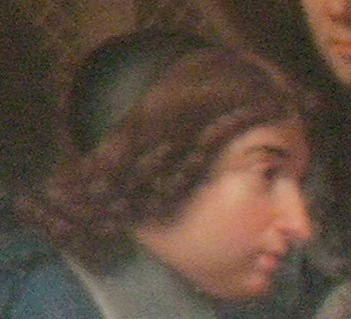
- Jean-Baptiste Du Hamel, detail from Testelin
- Born: 11 June 1624; Vire, now Calvados, France
- Died: 6 August 1706 (aged 82); Paris, France
- Other names: Jean-Baptiste Duhamel, Jean-Baptiste du Hamel
- Education: Caen
- Known for: Les Sphériques de Théodose (1642)
- Scientific career
- Fields: Natural philosophy (physics)
- Institutions: Parish of Neuilly-sur-Marne; church of Bayeux
- Patrons: Hardouin de Péréfixe, Jean-Baptiste Colbert

Jean-Baptiste Du Hamel, Duhamel or du Hamel (11 June 1624 – 6 August 1706) was a French cleric and natural philosopher of the late seventeenth century, and the first secretary of the Academie Royale des Sciences. As its first secretary, he influenced the initial work of the Académie, but his legacy and influence on the Académie and the growth of science in France is mixed.

== Early life and education ==
He was born at Vire, Normandy (now in the department of Calvados), the son of Vire lawyer Nicolas Du Hamel. The family also included two other brothers, Georges, who would become a lawyer like his father and go onto great success as a member of the Grand Conseil in Paris, and Guillaume, who became a priest and served in the court of the King of France. He began his formal studies at Caen, moving to Paris in 1642. Du Hamel demonstrated an early aptitude for scholarly work, and at the age of eighteen published an explanation of the work of Theodosius of Bithynia called Sphériques de Théodose, to which he added a treatise on trigonometry. He also showed an interest in a religious career, entering the Congregation of the Oratory in 1643, choosing them over other sects due to their focus on service and scholarship. He then moved to Angers to teach philosophy, and was formally ordained a priest while there in 1649. While in Angers, he not only focused his attention on theology, but also on the study of mathematics, astronomy, and science. He was then transferred back to Paris as an instructor at an Oratorian school on the Rue Saint Honoré. It is while in Paris that he published two of his works, the Astronomia Physica and De Meteoris et Fossibilus in 1660, both of which analyze and compare ancient theories with Cartesianism. This combination of theoretical and scientific analysis made many of Du Hamel's contemporaries see him and his work as a link between theology and the new ideas of science.

== Move to Paris ==
His return to Paris coincided with the end of the Fronde rebellion in 1652. This timing proved fortuitous for Du Hamel, as his absence from the capital meant he was not tainted by political leanings or participation in the rebellion. He also became reacquainted with his brother George, who, as a prominent attorney and member of the Grand Conseil, introduced him to some powerful patrons, including Hardouin de Péréfixe, a former tutor of Louis XIV and Archbishop of Paris, as well as the prominent Barberini family. Du Hamel leaves the Oratorians in 1653, but is then put in charge of the parish of Neuilly-sur-Marne. Resigning this position in 1663, he became chancellor of the church of Bayeux. At the same time, he is also busy in his study of natural philosophy and science, writing one of his most famous works, De Consensu Veteris er Novae Philosophiae, in 1663. By now, Du Hamel is a well-known and well-respected scholar with books on theological and philosophical issue that gained attention in the learned community, and with the help of his brother, and possibly his patron Péréfixe, Du Hamel comes to the attention of Jean-Baptiste Colbert as a potential secretary for the new Académie des Sciences. Du Hamel possesses many qualities that Colbert was looking for in a secretary for the group: he could read and write well in Latin, which would allow for communication with other scholars in Europe, he had recently published well-received works, he did not have any residual political alliance from the Fronte rebellions, and he had not participated in the handful of private academies that preceded the founding of the Académie des Sciences. When Colbert founds the Académie of Sciences in 1666, he appointed Du Hamel its first secretary.

== Académie des Sciences ==
Initially, Du Hamel handled the traditional work of a secretary; he recorded the minutes of the meetings, and assisted in the leadership of the group. One of his first duties was a trip to Caen to visit the Académie de Physique, formed there in 1662 by Pierre-Daniel Huet and André Graindorge. Here, he observed the operation of the group, and, when the Académie des Sciences is officially founded at the end of 1666, establishes a relationship between the two groups, which will become more formal after the Académie de Physique follows the Académie des Science as the second scientific group to receive royal recognition. In addition, it is Du Hamel, through his writings, which influence the social perception of the organization. In 1678 he publishes a new, four volume work Philosophia Vetus et Nova (originally attributed to Colbert, but written by Du Hamel), a new version of his De Consensu Veteris er Novae Philosophiae that was created to be used in universities and other schools to discuss and attempt to reconcile the various schools of philosophy, both ancient and modern. It was considered one of the most influential books in France at the time. Du Hamel also attributed the theories espoused by the book as representative of the ideas of the Academie, rather than just his own, allowing the Académie and its principals to touch students and promote and popularized science in the educated parts of French society.

However, Du Hamel's influence would not be felt as strongly as he (and others) may have wished, with some scholars attributing this to his religious influences, and others to his attention to other work. Specifically, his sterling reputation and his command of Latin caused him to be appointed as a member of the French delegation at Aix-la-Chapelle, negotiating a peace with Spain after the War of Devolution. In addition, he was later sent to England to assist a French diplomat, and while there, met with Robert Boyle, Henry Oldenburg, and other members of the Royal Society.

This extended absence from the Académie undermined Du Hamel's influence on the group. While away, Jean Gallois had been acting as secretary, but didn't command the same respect and admiration from the other members In addition, even upon returning to Paris, Du Hamel does not immediately reengage with the Académie, leaving the business affairs of the group in disorder, with no minutes recorded for the group from 1670 to 1674. Du Hamel also began to devote himself more reverently to his religious work, stepping back from scientific studies, except for his continued efforts toward writing and publishing a history of the Académie (in Latin). His commitment to writing and publishing in Latin also causes him some difficulty within the Académie, as many of the newer members prefer to write and publish in French. He completed his history of the group (Regiae Scientiarum Academiae Historia) in 1698, shortly after being replaced as secretary by Bernard le Bovier de Fontenelle. The reorganization of the Académie in 1699 had little or no effect on Du Hamel, with the changes to the organization in many ways anathema to his own interests and values. By 1700 as his scientific work was minimal, and his increasing attention directed toward the church and religion. Du Hamel died on August 6, 1706, in Paris.

== Legacy ==
Du Hamel's legacy is mixed. He is best remembered as the first secretary of the Académie des Sciences, but exerted little or no influence over administrative and organizational matters, the traditional role of the secretary. Instead, it is Du Hamel's scholarly work, both in his analysis of the competing philosophies of the ancient and new science, as well as his role in disseminating the values and beliefs of the Académie to students and scholars that prove to be the most influential on the history of the science in France.

== Published works ==
Among du Hamel's prolific publications were the following:

- Les Sphériques de Théodose (1642)
- Philosophia moralis christiana (Angers, 1652);
- Astronomia physica (Paris, 1660);
- De Meteoris et fossilibus (Paris, 1660)
- De consensu veteris et novæ philosophiæ (Paris, 1663), a treatise on natural philosophy in which the Greek and scholastic theories are compared with those of Descartes;
- De Corporis affectionibus (Paris, 1670)
- De mente humana (On the human mind, 1672), an account of the workings of the human mind developing the principles of Aristotelian logic and Baconian natural philosophy.
- De corpore animato (Paris, 1673);
- Philosophia vetus et nova ad usum scholæ accommodata (Paris, 1678). This work, composed by order of Colbert as a textbook for colleges, ran through many editions.
- Theologia speculatrix et practica (7 vols., Paris, 1690), abridged in five volumes for use as a textbook in seminaries (Paris, 1694);
- Regiæ scientiarum Academiæ historia (Paris, 1698; enlarged edition, 1701);
- Institutiones biblicæ (Paris, 1698), in which are examined the questions of the authority, integrity, and inspiration of the Bible, the value of the Hebrew text and of its translations, the style and method of interpretation, Biblical geography, and chronology;
- Biblia sacra Vulgatæ editionis (Paris, 1705), with introductions, notes, chronological, historical, and geographical tables.

== See also ==
- List of Roman Catholic scientist-clerics

== Sources ==
- Chisholm, Hugh, ed. (1911). "Duhamel, Jean Baptiste" . Encyclopædia Britannica. Vol. 8 (11th ed.). Cambridge University Press. p. 649.
- Ornstein, Martha. The Role of Scientific Societies in the Seventeenth Century. Chicago: The University of Chicago Press, 1938.
- Stroup, Alice. "Royal Funding of the Parisian Académie Royal des Sciences During the 1690s," in Transactions of the American Philosophical Society. Volume 77, Part 4, 1987.
- Sturdy, David.Science and Social Status: The Members of the Académie des Sciences, 1666–1750. Woodbridge, UK: The Boydell Press, 1995.
- Vialard, J.-B. Duhamel (Paris, 1884)
