= Philippe Le Sueur de Petiville =

French poet

Philippe Le Sueur, sieur de Petiville (31 March 1607 – 24 December 1657), was a Neo-Latin French poet.

Le Sueur was at Caen (Normandy). He traveled widely in his youth. Upon returning to his homeland at the age of twenty-six, he was appointed a counselor at the Parliament of Normandy, a position which, according to the testimony of Pierre-Daniel Huet, he held with great integrity.

A poet and a scholar, Le Sueur cultivated Latin poetry with some success, and he was among the distinguished people who composed the Académie des Sciences, Arts et Belles-Lettres de Caen at the time of its founding. Antoine Halley devoted seven lines of his poem, Cadomus to him (Opuscula, p. 17). Le Sueur responded in kind, sending in an elegy which was included in the same collection (p. 442).

A Huguenot, Le Sueur was the friend and practically a relative of Samuel Bochart. He had married in 1634 Marie Addée, the daughter of Emmanuel Addée, counselor and secretary to the king, and Marie Berger. They had two children and one grandson, Jacques, Sieur de Cairon, born in 1673 and still reported as a Huguenot in 1749.

Le Sueur wrote, according to Huet, easy and clever verses; none have been printed. The introductory parts of Geographiæ sacræ pars prior (Phaleg, de S. Bochart, Cadomi, 1646) incorporate some of his Latin verses.

== Sources ==
- Bulletins de la Société de l'histoire de Normandie (in French). Vol. 8. Rouen: A. Lestringant. 1899. p. 163.
- Frères Haag (1857). La France protestante ou vies des protestants français qui se sont fait un nom dans l'histoire, depuis les premiers temps de la réformation jusqu'à la reconnaissance du principe de la liberté des cultes par l'Assemblée nationale (in French). Genève: Joël Cherbuliez. p. 46.
- Théodore-Éloi Lebreton (1858). Biographie normande : recueil de notices biographiques et bibliographiques sur les personnages célèbres nés en Normandie et sur ceux qui se sont seulement distingués par leurs actions ou par leurs écrits (in French). Rouen: A. Le Brument. p. 552.
