= Giulio Pace =

Italian philosopher

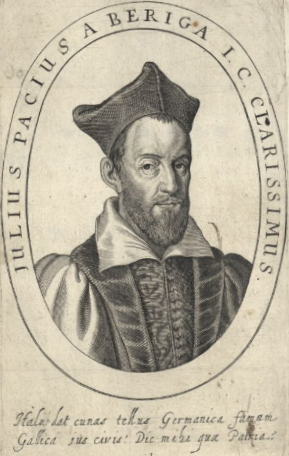
Giulio Pace

Giulio Pace de Beriga, also known as Giulio Pacio, or by his Latin name Julius Pacius of Beriga (9 April 1550 – 1635) was a well-known Italian Aristotelian scholar and jurist.

== Life ==
He was born in Vicenza, Italy, and studied law and philosophy in Padua.

He was deeply moved by the Reformation. The Catholic Church considered him immoral and a lover of heretical writings and he found himself put on trial by the Inquisition. Fleeing first to Geneva to escape their wrath, he soon converted to Protestantism while in Heidelberg.

His academic career was wide and varied, as he became an itinerant figure. In Geneva, he was elected as a public professor, and taught from 1575 to 1585. Studious and having a deep knowledge of Greek, he translated Aristotle. He taught law at the University of Heidelberg, from 1585 to 1594. Incidentally, while he was at Heidelberg, his quarrels with compatriot Scipione Gentili ultimately compelled the latter to leave for Altdorf. Also while there he showed his Ramist sympathies, but came into conflict with the philosophical faculty for trying to give private tuition in Ramist logic. After spending 1595 teaching logic at the Academy of Sedan, he was provost and prefect of studies at the University of Nimes, from 1597 to 1600. He also taught philosophy in Hungary, Leiden in the Netherlands, Grenoble in France, and in other places. At the University of Montpellier, where he was from 1600 to 1616, Nicolas Claude Fabri de Peiresc was his pupil. He also taught at the University of Valence, 1620-1, before taking a position at Padua where he taught from 1621 to 1635.

== Works ==
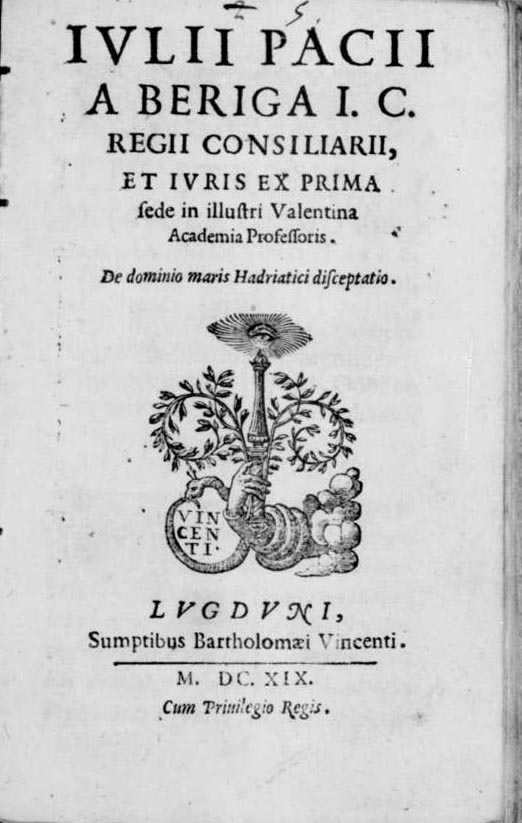
De dominio maris Hadriatici, 1619

Pace's edition of the Organon became standard during its life of 11 editions between 1584 and 1623, and even longer in the north of Europe. He also wrote a great many legal titles.

Pace wrote a pocket summary of Ramon Llull's art, first in Latin in 1618 and then in French in 1619. This work is seen as exceptional among its contemporaries as it does not digress into alchemy, cabalism, or magic, and in fact stays true to Llull's traditional interests. Pace wrote a similar work for Ramus as well.

Despite being a Protestant, in 1619, he published "De dominio maris Hadriatici dissertatio", defending the claims of the Venetian Republic to dominion over the Adriatic Sea, against the opposite claims of the Empire and the Kingdom of Naples. This controversy in early international law lined him up with Paolo Sarpi, against Juan Bautista Valenzuela Velázquez and Lorenzo Motino.

A book was written on the life of Giulio Pace in the early 20th century, focusing on his work as a jurist.

=== Publications ===
- Imp. Caes. Iustiniani Institutionum libri IV, Adnotationibus ac notis doctiss. scriptorum illustrati & adaucti. Quibus adiunximus appendicis loco, leges XII tab. explicatas. Vlpiani tit. XXIX adnotatos. Caii libros II Institut. Studio & opera Ioannis Crispini At. In ac postrema editione accesserunt; Iul. Pacio I.C. auctore, Ginevra: apud Eustathium Vignon, 1578.
- Ἐναντιόφαν. seu Legum conciliatarum centuriae III, Spirae: typis Bernardi Albini, 1586.
- De rebus creditis, seu De obligationibus qua re contrahuntur, et earum accessionibus, ad quartum librum Iustinianei Codicis, Commentarius; accesserunt tres indices, Spirae Nemetum: apud Bernardinum Albinum, 1596.
- Tractatus de contractibus et rebus creditis, seu de obligationibus quae re contrahuntur et earum accessionibus, ad quartum librum Iustinianei Codicis, doctissimi cuiusdam I.C. commentarius. Accesserunt tres indices, vnus titulorum, eo quo explicantur ordine descriptorum, alter eorundem titulorum ordine alphabetico, tertius rerum & verborum in toto opere memorabilium, Parisiis: apud Franciscum Lepreus, 1598.
- Isagogica in Institutiones imperiales (in Latin). Vol. 1. Lyon: Barthélemy Vincent. 1616.
- Oeconomia iuris utriusque, tam civilis quam canonici (in Latin). Vol. 2. Lyon: Barthélemy Vincent. 1616.
- Methodicorum ad iustinianeum Codicem libri (in Latin). Vol. 3. Lyon: Barthélemy Vincent. 1616.
- Methodicorum ad Iustinianeum Codicem libri III (in Latin). Vol. 4. Lyon: Barthélemy Vincent. 1606.
- Analysis Codicis (in Latin). Vol. 4. Lyon: Barthélemy Vincent. 1616.
- Artis Lullianae emendatae libri IV Quibus docetur methodus, ad inueniendum sermonem de quacumque re (in Latin). Valencia: Petrum Pinellum. 1618.
- De dominio maris Hadriatici (in Latin). Lyon: Barthélemy Vincent. 1619.
