= Claude Pithoys =

French professor and librarian (1587-1676)

Claude Pithoys (1587, Vitry-le-François – 1676, Sedan) was a French professor of philosophy and law at the Academy of Sedan, Protestant convert and librarian for the Duc de Bouillon. He was raised a Franciscan but in 1632 "he renounced his vows, abjured his faith and became a Protestant, throwing himself under the protection of the Duc de Bouillon who secured for him a post in the protestant Academy of Sedan"; he maintained this post until 1675.

He is best known for his part in what historian of religion Ioan Culianu called "one of the most famous cases of demonic possession in the seventeenth century" where, in 1618, a young widow of Nancy, France, Elisabeth de Ranfaing, fell into the hands of the local doctor, Charles Poirot, who allegedly proceeded to violate her and give her medicine - intending to cause demonic possession. Pithoys was called to perform an exorcism but refused and instead wrote his Descouverture des faux possedez (1621) where he attacked the doctor's evidence against Elisabeth and the doctor himself, claiming he had drugged her into convulsions and insanity - simulating demonic possession. This was displeasing towards the local clergy and so a less skeptical doctor, Remy Pichard, was brought in to exorcise Ranfaing. The doctor was subsequently burned at the stake in 1622 and Elisabeth was fully exorcised in 1625, founding a religious order in later life.

Jean Lhermitte and Étienne Delcambre argued this tale must be apocryphal, as the effect of the doctor's drug would not be likely to persist for the seven years for which Elisabeth was possessed. They argue that Elisabeth would more likely have been trying to escape her parents, and join a French religious order.

He is also well known for his skepticism towards superstition and exorcism, something uncommon for his time. He questioned the validity of many popular superstitions but, according to philosopher Brian Copenhaver, "such questioning was rare, alien to the zealots and undeveloped in aspiring rationalists".

== Works ==
- La Descouverture des faux possedez, tres-utile pour recognoistre et discerner les simulations, feintises et illusions d'avec les vrayes possessions diaboliques (Châlons-en-Champagne, 1621)
- L'horoscope, roue de fortune et bonne aventure des predestinez (Paris, 1628)
- Amorce des ames devotes et religieuses - Sur ce theoreme "Bonum est nos hic esse" (Paris, 1628)
- Traité curieux de l'astrologie Judiciaire ou Preservatif contre l'astronmantie des Genethliaques (Sedan, 1641)
- Cosmographie ou Doctrine de la Sphere avec un Traité de la Geographie (Sedan, 1641)
- L'Apocalypse de Meliton, Ou Revelation Des Mysteres Cenobitiques (Sedan, 1662)
