= Pierre Patrix =

French poet

Pierre Patrix, seigneur de Sainte-Marie, Norman gentleman (1583 – 6 October 1671), was a French poet.

Patrix was born in 1583 at Caen (Normandy) from Claude Patrix, councilor to the bailiwick of the city and Margaret Bourgueville. His grandfather was a native of Beaucaire (Provence), who, having been in Caen in 1521, when the Parliament of Rouen sent some of its members to reform the University, was chosen by them, although he only was a Bachelor of Laws at the time, to be appointed as a professor of civil law. Some time later, he became Counselor in Parliament and University regent.

Patrix's father had envisioned a career in law for his son. However, after defending his thesis before the Law School at Caen, on 19 August 1608, Patrix soon found out this line of duty to be utterly unattractive to him. To Patrix's lively, playful and independent frame of mind, the pleasures of his native Caen, then a haven of sociability and jollity, were far more attractive than practicing law, so he vowed to retain his independence. He contentedly kept this lifestyle until the age of forty, when, seeing himself left with very little in way of income, he sought to improve his prosperity for joining Gaston, Duke of Orléans, the brother of Louis XIII, as first marshal-master.

The prince's bright and cheerful court in residence at Blois surpassed his brother's in terms of politeness, in agreement, and good taste. There, Patrix had an opportunity to demonstrate his wits. Gaston liked and esteemed Patrix, who held the rank of Grand Vicar in a Grand Conseil de Vauriennerie which he had established. He also met the likes of Voiture, Segrais, Chaudebonne, Rivièrere, and Belot. The talents of his mind, as well as his honesty, and loyalty, earned him everyone's esteem." He also was the one to hide Pascal in his house around the time he published his first Provincial Letters.

Patrix always followed his employer's fortunes, and after his demise, in 1660, he attached his fate to that his widow, Marguerite of Lorraine, becoming her first squire. All Patrix got for his long and loyal service of Gaston of Orléans was the government of the county and castle of Limours, Montlhéry, with an accommodation at the palace of Orléans and some rather insignificant pension. He even had to serve a local member of the aristocracy who was trying to deprive him of his command to benefit one of his own cronies, with the divine commandment, "You shall not set your desire on your neighbor's house or land."

Patrix was described as having a natural and pleasant spirit. He adopted an air of silliness, which was common in Caen. This, along with his Norman accent, contributed to his reputation. Huet reported hearing Patrix boast he had taught Voiture how to be silly, something for which Voiture indeed was known.

Patrix was renowned for his witty repartees, many of which have been preserved. For instance, when people would talk about science in gatherings, he would tell those around him, he was going to taste their wine. After he suffered a severe illness at the age of eighty, his friends rejoiced at his recovery, and urged him to get back up: "Alas! gentlemen, he replied, I need not bother to get dressed."

As he was on the end of his life, and concerned about death, he wrote, a few days before his end, those famous lines:

Je songeais cette nuit, que de mal consumé

Côte à côte d'un pauvre on m'avait inhumé;
Mais ne pouvant souffrir ce fâcheux voisinage.
En mort de qualité, je lui tins ce langage.
Retire toi, Coquin, va pourrir loin d'ici,
Il ne t'appartient pas de m'approcher ainsi.
Coquin! ce m'a-t-il dit, d'une arrogance extrême,
Va chercher tes coquins ailleurs, coquin toi même.
Ici tous sont égaux, je ne te dois plus rien,

Je suis sur mon fumier, comme toi sur le tien.

Patrix is mentioned in one of Scarron's poems:

Et Patrix,
Quoique Normand, homme de prix.

Patrix left a La Miséricorde de Dieu sur la conduite d'un pécheur pénitent, avec quelques autres pieces chrestiennes, le tout composé et mis en lumiere par luy-mesme, en réparation du passé, a collection he dedicated to the Duke of Orléans. "Ce recueil", Huet wrote in his Les Origines de Caen, "mérite d'être conservé pour sa singularité; car encore que les vers soient sort négligés, languissants, sentent le terroir Normand et le déclin de l'âge, l'on y voit néanmoins briller cet esprit original d'où ils sont partis, et l'on y reconnait un cœur touché d'une piété sincère. (p. 384). Some of Patrix's songs and other poems were collected in the Fourth volume of the Barbin's Compendium. Two pieces by him on the Maid of Orléans, in a Recueil d'inscriptions et vers on this subject, were published in Paris in 1628, in-4°.

A friend of his fellow denizen Malherbe, Patrix had committed several gallant, even quite licentious pieces, in his youth, but at a later age, when the spirit of devotion took him over, he conducted a painstaking search, and burned the most he could, thereafter writing only on spiritual topics.

He died at Paris on 6 October 1671 at age 88, and was buried in the church of the nuns of the Calvaire.

== Sources ==
- Auguis, Pierre René (1824). Les Poètes françois, depuis le XVII^{e} jusqu'à Malherbe. Vol. 6. Paris: Crapelet.
- Niceron, Jean-Pierre (1733). Mémoires pour servir à l'histoire des hommes illustres dans la république des lettres. Vol. 24. Paris: Briasson.
