= Peter du Moulin =

French-English Anglican clergyman

Peter du Moulin (1601–1684) was a French-English Anglican clergyman, son of the Huguenot pastor Pierre du Moulin and brother of Lewis du Moulin. He was the anonymous author of Regii sanguinis clamor ad coelum adversus paricidas Anglicanos, published at The Hague in 1652, a royalist work defending Salmasius and including a strong attack on John Milton.

== Life ==
He was born at Paris on 24 April 1601. After studying at Sedan and Leyden, he spent time at Cambridge, where he received the degree of D.D. About 1625, after an imprisonment at Dunkirk, he was appointed to the living (refused by his father) of St John the Baptist's Church, Chester, but there is no record of his having resided there. In 1640, however, on becoming D.D. at Leyden, he described himself as holding that benefice.

He was rector of Witherley, Leicestershire, in 1633, and of Wheldrake, Yorkshire, in 1641. During the First English Civil War he was first in Ireland as tutor in the Boyle family, and was next tutor at Oxford to the sons of Richard Boyle, 1st Earl of Burlington, Charles Boyle, 3rd Viscount Dungarvan and Richard Boyle (d. 1665), frequently preaching at St. Peter-in-the-East in Oxford. He was rector of Adisham, Kent, from 1646 (with a short intermission in 1660 on the reinstatement of John Oliver) till his death.

He sided, like his father, with the royalists, and wrote the scurrilous reply to Milton, Regii Sanguinis Clamor, at the time mistakenly attributed to Alexander More. Du Moulin concealed his authorship until the Restoration, was consequently unmolested, and was in 1656 made D.D. at Oxford.

At the Restoration he was rewarded by a chaplaincy to Charles II and by succeeding in 1660 to his father's prebend (Stall IV) at Canterbury Cathedral. He took up his residence there.

Du Moulin died 10 October 1684, and was buried in the Cathedral. Another brother, Cyrus, was for a time French pastor at Canterbury.

== Works ==
He published A Treatise of Peace and Contentment of the Soul (1657), A vindication of the sincerity of the protestant religion in the point of obedience to sovereigns (1679) and about twenty other works in English, French, and Latin. Anthony à Wood styles him "an honest, zealous Calvinist".

He translated his father's work, Tirannie que les papes ont exercé depuis quelque siècles sur les roys d'Angleterre [Tyranny that the Popes exercised for some centuries over the kings of England] (1674).
