= Alexander Morus =

Franco-Scottish Protestant preacher

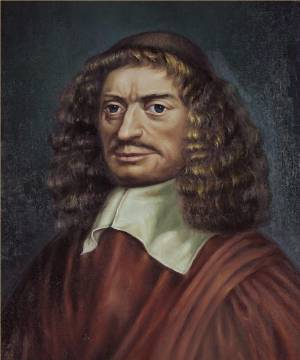
Alexander Morus

Alexander Morus (or Moir or More) (25 September 1616, Castres – 28 September 1670, Paris) was a Franco-Scottish Protestant preacher.

== Biography ==
More's father, born in Scotland, was a rector at a Huguenot college in the town of Castres in Languedoc. In 1636 he left to study theology in Geneva, where he became professor in Greek in 1639. By 1648, he was professor of theology, pastor and dean of the Academy in Geneva.

He was an Amyraldist, and ran into trouble in Geneva where his orthodoxy was suspect. He was appointed successor to Friedrich Spanheim, but then was forced to leave Geneva.

He was working in the Netherlands in the 1650s. In 1654, John Milton launched a vitriolic attack upon him, in his Defensio Secunda, in the mistaken belief that he was the author of an anonymous Royalist work containing a "rabid" attack on Milton, called Regii sanguinis clamor ad coelum (Cry of the King's blood to Heaven). Morus replied with Fides Publica in 1654, published like the Regii sanguinis by Adriaan Vlacq (also attacked by Milton). Milton then launched a second attack after Morus's reply. The true authorship of the Regii sanguinis, written by Pierre Du Moulin, sent to Salmasius and only seen into print by Morus, came out in 1670.

He was professor of ecclesiastical history at Amsterdam from 1652 to 1659, and pastor at Charenton for the last year of his life. During his time at Amsterdam he completed the second edition of Joseph Justus Scaliger's Thesaurus temporum and had it published there in 1658.

== Notes ==
Academic offices
Preceded by Giovanni Diodati; Théodore Tronchin; Friedrich Spanheim	Professor of Theology at the Genevan Academy; 1642–1649; With: Giovanni Diodati (1642-1645); Théodore Tronchin (1642–1649); Antoine Léger (1645-1649)	Succeeded by Théodore Tronchin; Antoine Léger; Philippe Mestrezat
