= Ordre de Notre-Dame du Refuge =

Former Catholic female order

Ordre de Notre-Dame du Refuge (Order of Refuge) was a religious order founded in 1624 by Elisabeth de Ranfaing in Nancy, France. Following the rule of Saint Augustine, it was founded for women recovering from a life of prostitution. Pope Urban VIII approved the order in 1634.

The order was suppressed in 1793 but, was reestablished after the French Revolution in Montpellier; in 1930 it was absorbed by the Franciscans of Mary Immaculate of Bordeaux.
