= Academy of Sedan =

The Academy of Sedan (French: Académie de Sedan) was a Huguenot academy in Sedan in the Principality of Sedan, founded in 1579 and suppressed in 1681. It was one of the main centres for the production of Reformed pastors in France for a hundred years.

== History ==
The Academy of Sedan was modeled on the Academy of Geneva (which is today the University of Geneva), which was founded by John Calvin in 1559. It was organized by the efforts of Françoise de Bourbon-Vendôme, Princess of Sedan, daughter of Louis de Bourbon, Duke of Montpensier and wife of Henri-Robert de La Marck, Prince of Sedan (the first Prince of Sedan) in 1579. It was initially known as the College of Sedan (Collège de Sedan). In 1601, the National Synod of the Reformed Church of France, meeting in Jargeau, voted to transform the College of Sedan into its Academy for the training of pastors. The Academy of Sedan was suppressed in 1681 as part of Louis XIV's anti-Protestant measures that would climax in the 1685 Edict of Fontainebleau.

== Famous professors ==
=== Before the organization of the academy ===
- Mathieu Béroalde, professor of Hebrew, 1573–74
- Louis Cappel de Montgemberg, professor of Theology, 1576
- Immanuel Tremellius, professor of Hebrew, 1576–79
- Austrius Calabrinus, professor of Philosophy, 1579
- Jacques Cappel, professor of Hebrew, 1594
- Moïse Quadratus, professor of physics, 1594
- Robert de Visme, professor of philosophy, 1594
- Giulio Pace, professor of Law, 1595

=== Professors of law (one chair) ===
- Augustin Caillet, 1608–24
- Charles Bordelius, 1624–30
- Jean Daubert, 1630–44
- Claude Pithoys, 1663
- J. J. Burkhart, 1673–75
- Pierre Billot, 1675

=== Professors of Greek (one or two chairs depending on the time) ===
- Toussaint Berchet, 1602-24 (Berchet played a significant role in the organization of the Academy in 1601)
- Didier Héraut, 1602
- Gautier Donaldson, 1603–09
- Samuel Néran, 1608–11
- Jacob Roussel, 1614
- Jean Brazi, 1629–51
- José Le Vasseur, 1646–71
- Jacques Du Rondel, 1654

=== Professors of Hebrew (one chair) ===
- Jacques Cappel, 1602–24
- Jean Huttenius, 1613
- Alexandre Colvill, 1619–43
- Abraham Rambour, 1620–51
- Josué Levasseur, 1646–61
- Abraham Colvill, 1661–67
- Pierre Jurieu, 1674–81

=== Professors of theology (three chairs) ===
- Daniel Tilenus, 1602–19
- Jacques Cappel, 1602–24
- Aaron Blondel, 1603–05
- André Melvin, 1611–19
- Abraham Rambour, 1620–54
- Pierre Du Moulin, 1621–58
- Samuel Maresius, 1625–36
- Alexandre Colvill, 1619–43
- Louis Cappel, 1633–58
- Le Blanc de Beaulieu, 1645–75
- Abraham Colvill, 1658–67
- José Le Vasseur, 1646–71
- Alpée de Saint-Maurice, 1660–81
- Paul Joly, 1673–76
- Henri Sacrelaire, 1676–81
- Pierre Jurieu, 1673–81
- Pierre Trouillard, 1676–80
- Jakob Abbadie, 1680–81

=== Professors of philosophy (two chairs) ===
- John Cameron, 1602–04
- Arthur Johnston, 1606–23
- Claude Pithoys, 1633–75
- Joseph Pithoys, 1655
- Adam Steuart, 1622–28
- P. Bisterfeld, 1624–26
- Alexandre Colvill, 1627–46
- Étienne Brazi, 1661–81
- Pierre Jurieu, 1671–81
- Pierre Bayle, 1675–81

=== Professors of rhetoric (Latin) (one chair) ===
- Jean Brazi, 1664
- Jacques Du Rondel, 1664–81

=== Professors of mathematics (one chair) ===
- Jean de Vesle, 1605
- Richard Doussert, 1613
- Abraham Colvill, 1661–67

=== Professors of physics (one chair) ===
- Gautier Donaldson, 1608
- Abraham Du Han, 1640–53
- Alexandre Colvill, 1619–43

=== Directors of military exercises ===
- De Saint-Martin 1613
- Du Gast 1680
- Baron 1681
- Legrand 1681-1685
- also influential was the engineer Jean Errard, who taught in the military academy

== Famous alumni ==
- Nicolas Antoine
- Pierre Allix
- Jacques Basnages
- Samuel Bochart
- Abraham de Moivre
- Pierre Du Moulin
- Charles Drelincourt
- Nicasius le Febure
- Jacques Le Paulmier de Grentemesnil
- Jacques Moisant de Brieux
- Charles de Sainte-Maure, duc de Montausier
- Pierre Du Prat
- Simon Gaschier
- the nephews of Henri de La Tour d'Auvergne, Duke of Bouillon and Countess Elisabeth of Nassau:
  - the sons of Countess Louise Juliana of Nassau: Frederick V, Elector Palatine and his younger brother Ludwig Philipp of Pfalz-Simmern-Kaiserslautern
  - the son of John VII, Count of Nassau-Siegen: William, Count of Nassau-Siegen
- Joachim Sigismund of Brandenburg, son of John Sigismund, Elector of Brandenburg

== Sources ==
- Charles Peyran, Histoire de l'ancienne Académie réformée de Sedan, thèse présentée à la faculté de théologie protestante, 22 juin 1846, Strasbourg : Veuve Berger-Levrault, 1846 Histoire de l'ancienne académie réformée de Sedan, 58 p.
- Extraits de la Chronique du Père Norbert concernant le Collège de Sedan, dans Revue historiques des Ardennes, Mézières : Edmond Sénemaud/impr. F. Dervin, 1867, vol.5, pp. 39–64 Revue historique des Ardennes, puis pp. 166–187 Revue historique des Ardennes
- Pierre-Daniel Bourchenin, Étude sur les académies protestantes en France au XVIe et au XVIIe siècle (Paris: Grassart, 1882).
- Pierre Congar, Jean Lecaillon et Jacques Rousseau, Sedan et le pays sedanais, vingt siècles d’histoire (Paris: Guénégaud, 1969; Marseille: Laffitte Reprints, 1978)
