= Elisabeth de Ranfaing =

French founder of the Order of Refuge

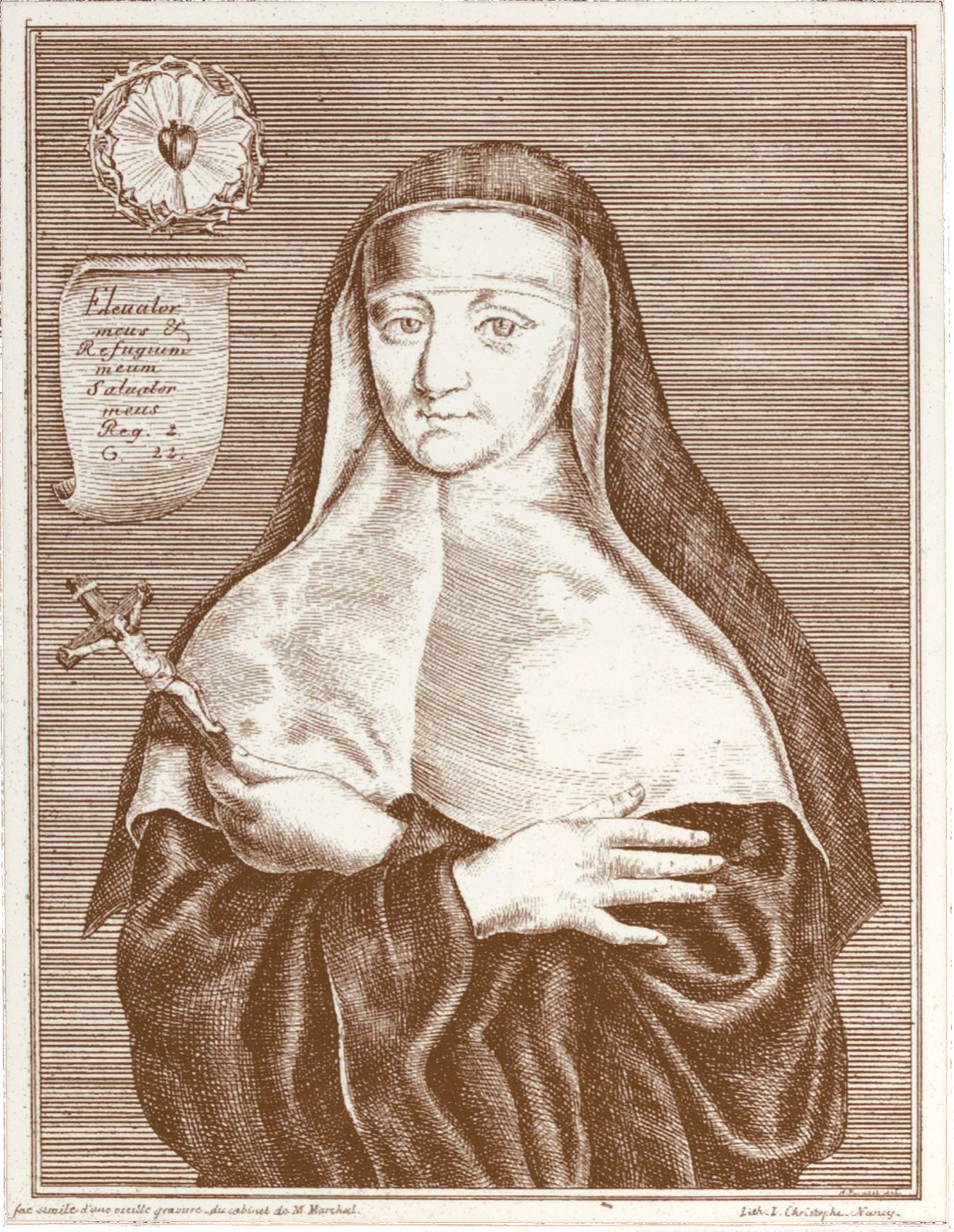
Engraving of Elisabeth de Ranfaing, 1654. Identified as Portrait de la M. Elisab[eth] de la croix de Jésus, fondatrice de l'instit[ution] de N[ot]re Dame du refuge des vierges et des filles pénit[entes] à Nancy en Lorraine.

Marie Elisabeth de Ranfaing (30 October 1592 – 1 January 1649) also known as Marie Elisabeth de la Croix de Jesus was the French founder of the Order of Refuge, and a Catholic woman once claimed to be demonically possessed.

== Biography ==
Elisabeth de Ranfaing was born on 30 October 1592 at Remiremont, Lorraine to the lesser nobles Jean-Lienard Ranfaing and Claude de Magnieres. She was forced into wedlock by her parents to marry the much older nobleman Francois Dubois, whom she had no desire to marry, fleeing to the monastery for refuge. In 1618, she was recovered and married Dubois, with whom she had three children.

Later that year she became 'demonically possessed' at a social event. This possession lasted till 1625, relenting after a lengthy exorcism. French professor and early sceptic Claude Pithoys was called in to perform an exorcism, but he instead declared his suspicion that Ranfaing had been drugged by the local doctor, Charles Poirot, into convulsions simulating demonic possession. Pithoys was dismissed and another less skeptical doctor, Remy Pichard, was brought in to perform the exorcism. Poirot was burned in 1622 for his suspected witchcraft. Ranfaing later claimed Poirot had charmed her into demonic possession. Skepticism has been placed on Poirot's guilt in modern times with Étienne Delcambre and Jean Lhermitte doubting that the doctor's drug would result in convulsions for the seven years Ranfaing was possessed. They claim instead that she fabricated her own possession in order to integrate herself in the religious society of France.

She was widowed at 24. On 1 January 1631 she founded the Order of Refuge (Ordre de Notre-Dame du Refuge) for women recovering from a life of prostitution. In 1634, Pope Urban VIII approved the order. Ranfaing died on 14 January 1649 in Nancy, France.

== In popular culture ==
In Françoise Mallet-Joris's book Trois âges de la nuit, Mallet-Joris presents a fictionalised account of Elisabeth de Ranfaing's life along with the witch trials of two other 16th and 17th century figures accused of witchcraft.
