= Jacques Moisant de Brieux =

French poet and historian

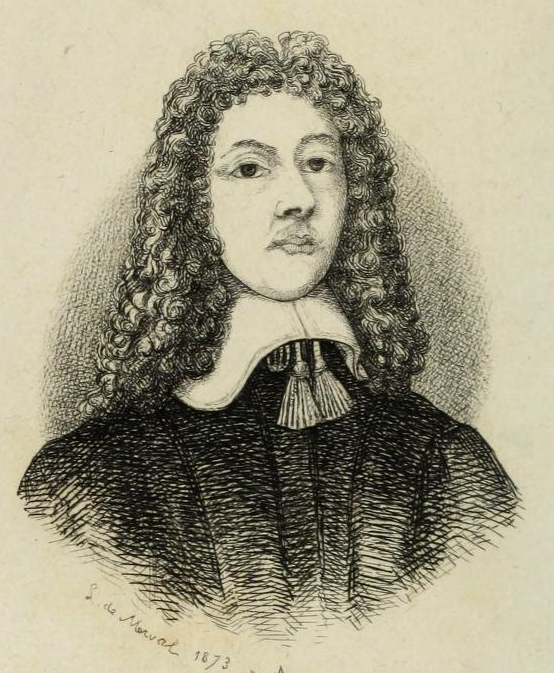
Jacques Moisant de Brieux

Jacques Moisant de Brieux (13 May 1611 – 20 May 1674) was a French poet and historian.

Born at Caen (Normandy) in an aristocratic Huguenot family on 13 May 1611, Moisant de Brieux had Antoine Halley as his first preceptor before continuing his studies in the best Protestant institutions of his time. At the Academy of Sedan, he met the Duke of Montausier, who was to become his friend and protector. At Leiden University, he studied for two years under Professor Gerardus Vossius. He then went on to study in English libraries while attending courses taught by the best teachers of England.

Upon his return in France, he became an attorney-at-law and held the office of Counselor at the Parliament of Metz. Forced to resign his office for health reasons, he returned to his hometown. Moisant very missed Caen, and he found there that cultivating the humanities provided him with an outlet for the ills he suffered.

He supported intellectual endeavors among his fellow Caen denizens by inviting into his Hôtel d'Escoville a group of educated people who were to become the Académie des Sciences, Arts et Belles-Lettres de Caen, the first such academy to have been founded in France, after the French Academy.

Moisant held close ties with Jean Chapelain, Samuel Bochart, et Pierre-Daniel Huet. He himself wrote Latin poems, and such critics as Pierre Bayle praised them. He also wrote four letters in Latin, respectively on the origins of the Academy of Caen, François de Malherbe, the antiquities of Caen and Caen writers.

Moisant also was a successful author in French: he was an historian, a poet and a moralist. Jean Regnault de Segrais praised his Meditations, which are "not just for Calvinists but also for us, since there is nothing in them that touches upon points of contention."

Suffering from kidney stones, Moisant died at Caen, on 20 May 1674, only a few days after he had resigned himself to having them surgically removed.

== Works ==
- (in Latin) Heliconis statvs hodiernvs sev De amore svmmo qvo mvsas proseqvitvr avgvstissima eademqve ervditissima Svecorvm Princeps, elegia…, Caen, Jean Cavelier, 1651
- (in Latin) Mosanti Briosii Poematvm pars altera : accesserunt quaedam, ad illustrissimum Sanclarum Turgotium ... & ad clarissimum Premontium Grandorgaeum, de Cadomensium rebus epistolae, Caen, Jean Cavelier, 1669
- (in Latin) Iacobi Mosanti Briosij Epistolae, Caen, Jean Cavelier, 1670
- (in French) Recueil de pièces en prose et en vers, Caen, Jean Cavalier, 1671
- (in French) Les origines de quelques coutumes anciennes, et de plusieurs façons de parler triviales, avec un vieux manuscrit en vers, touchant L’origine des chevaliers bannerets, Caen, Jean Cavalier, 1672
- (in French) Méditations morales et chrétiennes, Caen, Jean Cavalier, 1666
- (in French) Les divertissements de Moisant de Brieux, Caen, Jean Cavalier, 1673
- (in French) Œuvres choisies, Éd. René Delorme, Caen, Julien Travers, 1875

== Sources ==
- J. A. Galland, Essai sur l'histoire du protestantisme à Caen et en Basse-Normandie, de l'Édit de Nantes à la Révolution, Paris, Grassart, 1898, pp. 117–22.
