= Thomas Pierce =

British priest (1622–1691)

Thomas Pierce or Peirse (1622–1691) was an English churchman and controversialist, a high-handed President of Magdalen College, Oxford, and Dean of Salisbury.

== Early life ==
He was the son of John Pierce or Peirse, a woollen-draper and mayor of Devizes, Wiltshire. He was appointed chorister of Magdalen College, Oxford, in 1633, while receiving an education in Magdalen College School under William White, for whom in 1662 he obtained preferment. On 7 December 1638 he matriculated at the college, and in 1639 he became a demy. He graduated B.A. on 4 December 1641, and M. A. on 21 June 1644, noted as a poet and musician. In 1643 he was elected a fellow of his college, and was expelled on 15 May 1648 by the parliamentary visitors, a proceeding which gave rise to his satire on them.

He entered the household of Dorothy Spencer, Countess of Sunderland, as tutor to her only son Robert Spencer. He spent some years in travelling with his pupil through France and Italy, and in 1656 he was presented by the countess to the rectory of Brington, Northamptonshire, which he held until 1676. In 1659 he was appointed praelector of theology at his college. Until the end of 1644 Pierce was a Calvinist, but he then changed his views for Arminian ones, and attacked his abandoned opinions with the zeal of a neo-convert. For some time he was content to confine his thoughts to manuscript, but in 1655 he expounded his creed, that the sin in him was due to his own and not to God's will, and that the good done by him was received from the special grace and favour of God. Pierce then further defined his position. Controversy raged about these works until 1660, and in further tracts Pierce replied to attacks by William Barlee, rector of Brockhall, Northamptonshire, Edward Bagshawe, Henry Hickman, and Richard Baxter. In 1658 he reprinted his contributions to the controversy.

== College head ==
At the Restoration, Pierce was reinstated in his fellowship, proceeding also D.D. on 7 August 1660, and being appointed in the same year chaplain-in-ordinary to Charles II. He became the seventh canon of Canterbury on 9 July 1660, and prebendary of Langford Major at Lincoln on 25 September 1662, holding both preferments until his death. After a strong opposition from some of the fellows, which was silenced by a letter from court, he was elected President of Magdalen College, Oxford, on 9 November 1661. He deprived Thomas Jeanes of his fellowship, ostensibly for a pamphlet justifying the proceedings of the parliament against Charles I, but really for criticising the latinity of his 'Concio Synodica ad Clerum'. Another of his victims was Henry Yerbury, a senior fellow and doctor of physic, whom he first put out of commons and then expelled. His conduct brought about a visitation of the college by George Morley, bishop of Winchester, whom he treated with discourtesy. Pierce endeavoured to justify his action against Yerbury, who vindicated his own conduct in a manuscript defence. Two vindications of Pierce appeared in the guise of lampoons, viz., 'Dr. Pierce his Preaching confuted by his Practice', and 'Dr. Pierce his Preaching exemplified in his Practice.' Pierce assisted John Dobson in the first and wrote the second himself, although Dobson, to screen him, owned the authorship, and was expelled from the university for a time. Eventually, after ten years of constant contentions with the fellows, he resigned at evening prayers in the chapel on 4 March 1672. He himself wrote to Henry More that he had vacated his place for reasons of climate and love of private life, but he had been promised other preferment; and Humphry Prideaux says that he sold the headship of the college.

== Controversialist ==
On 16 June 1662 he had been appointed to the lectureship at Carfax. During 1661 and 1662 many sermons were preached by him in London, including one delivered on 1 February 1663 before the king at Whitehall against the Roman catholic church. This pronouncement produced a furious controversy. Within a year it ran through at least eight editions, and it was translated and printed in several foreign languages. Two replies by J. S., usually attributed to John Sergeant, were published in 1663, and it was also answered by S. C., i.e. Serenus Cressy. Daniel Whitby, Meric Casaubon in 1665, and John Dobson defended Pierce, who himself retorted in 'A Specimen of Mr. Cressy's Misadventures,' which was prefixed to John Sherman's Infallibility of the Holy Scriptures.

Samuel Pepys heard Pierce preach on 8 April 1663, and described him as having 'as much of natural eloquence as most men that ever I heard in my life, mixed with so much learning.' Years later, John Evelyn complained of a sermon by him at Whitehall 'against our late schismatics,' that it was 'a rational discourse, but a little oversharp, and not at all proper for the auditory there.'

== Dean of Salisbury ==
On 4 May 1675 Pierce was admitted and installed as dean of Salisbury. He quarrelled with his chapter, and its members appealed to the archbishop. He invited a quarrel with his bishop, Seth Ward, by ranging himself with the choir against episcopal monition. Trouble again arose between his diocesan and himself about 1683, when his only surviving son, Robert Pierce, was denied a prebendal stall in the cathedral. The dean much resented this refusal, and entangled the bishop in controversy. He asserted that the dignities connected with the cathedral church of Salisbury were in the gift of the crown, and communicated this view to the ecclesiastical commissioners. By their command he wrote a 'Narrative' in the king's interest, and the bishop answered it with a similar 'Narrative.' These circulated in manuscript, and the dean followed up his action by printing anonymously and for private circulation in 1683 'A Vindication of the King's Sovereign Right.' This was also printed as an appendix to the 'History and Antiquities of Cathedral of Salisbury and Abbey of Bath,' 1723. Through this controversy Ward was forced to visit London several times.

The dean had purchased an estate in the parish of North Tidworth, a few miles north of Amesbury in Wiltshire. He died there on 28 March 1691, and was buried in the churchyard of Tidworth. At his funeral there was given to every mourner a copy of his book entitled 'Death considered as a Door to a Life of Glory [anon.] Printed for the Author's private use,' n.d. [1690 ?] His grave represented a small stone banqueting house; an inscription, made by himself a little before his death, was engraved on a brass plate fastened to the roof of the church. Pierce's wife Susanna died in June 1696, and was also buried in the churchyard of North Tidworth. Robert, his son, became rector of North Tidworth in 1680, and through the favour of Anne, then princess of Denmark, was appointed prebendary of Chardstock in Salisbury Cathedral in 1689. He retained both these preferments until his death in 1707.

== Works ==
Among Pierce's other works were:

- A correct copy of some notes concerning Gods decrees especially of reprobation, 1655.
- The Signal Diagnostic, whereby to judge of our Affections and present and future Estate, 1670.
- A Decade of Caveats to the People of England, 1679; against popery and dissent, and mostly preached in Salisbury Cathedral.
- The first of Two Letters containing a further Justification of the Church of England against Dissenters, 1682.
- Pacificatorium Orthodoxae Theologiae Corpusculum, 1683 and 1685, a treatise for young men entering into holy orders.
- The Law and Equity of the Gospel, or the Goodness of our Lord as a Legislator, 1686.
- Articles to be enquired of within the peculiar Jurisdiction of Thomas Pierce, Dean of Sarum, in his Triennial Visitation, 168 [sic].
- A Prophylactick from Disloyalty in these Perilous Times, in a letter to Herbert, bishop of Hereford, 1688; in support of the declaration of James II, and signed 'Theophilus Basileus.'
- An effectual Prescription against the Anguish of all Diseases, 1691; apparently posthumous.

As a popular preacher Pierce was the author of many printed sermons. With the exception of three, all were included in A Collection issued in 1671.

Pierce corrected, amended, and completed for the press the Annales Mundi, 1655, and compiled the Variantes Lectiones ex Annotatis Hug. Grotii, cum ejusdem de iis judicio, which forms the fifteenth article in the last volume of Brian Walton's Polyglot Bible. He contributed verses to the Oxford collections, Horti Carolini rosa altera, 1640; On Queen Henrietta Maria's Return from Holland, 1643; and on the death of the queen, 1669.

He was also the author of the anonymous poem Caroli τοῦ μακαρίτου Παλιγγενεσία, 1649, which was included in the same year in Monumentum Regale, a Tombe for Charles I. This poem was also appended to Pierce's Latin translation (1674 and 1675) of Reasons of Charles I against the pretended Jurisdiction of the High Court of Justice, 22 Jan. 1648, along with Latin epitaphs on Charles I, Henry Hammond, Jeffry Palmer, and several friends; and some hymns, which are said to have been set to music by Nicholas Lanier and others. Anthony Wood asserts that the music of the Divine Anthems of William Child was set to the poetry of Pierce. Arthur Phillips is also said to have composed music for his poems.

He encouraged by his patronage William Walker the grammarian, Thomas Smith, and John Rogers the musician.

== Notes and references ==
- This article incorporates text from a publication now in the public domain: "Pierce, Thomas". Dictionary of National Biography. London: Smith, Elder & Co. 1885–1900.

=== Sources ===
Tyacke, Nicholas (1997). The History of the University of Oxford. Vol. IV: Seventeenth-Century Oxford. Oxford: Oxford University Press.

Academic offices
Preceded by John Oliver	President of Magdalen College, Oxford; 1661–72	Succeeded by Henry Clerke
