= Académie de Physique =

The Academie de Physique was established in Caen, Normandy, France, in 1662. It was the first provincial academy of sciences to be granted a royal charter, and one of the first academies in France to promote both empiricism and scholarly cooperation as the basis for its programs. The academy was in existence from 1662 to 1672.

== Beginnings (1662–1667) ==
The academy was founded in 1662 by Andre Graindorge, local physician and natural philosopher, and Pierre-Daniel Huet, a well-known scholar and native of Caen that had recently returned home from a trip to Sweden, where he worked at the court of Queen Christina. Both Graindorge and Huet were members of Caen's Académie des Belle Letters (then called the Grand Cheval, named for the building where the group held their meetings) whose meetings largely focused on philosophy and literature, much to the frustration of both men, as both had a growing interest in natural philosophy. Graindorge was particularly interested in exploring experiment and examination over the dependence on theory and philosophy. The academy began as a patronage circle, with Huet, the more well known and respected of the two acting as patron and Graindorge directing the program of study. The original group did not have a consistent membership, but served as an informal group of local scientists with similar interests. For the first several years, the group met on an informal basis, mostly meeting to view dissections and discuss them.

In 1665, the combination of the appearance of a comet, as well as Graindorge's extended trip to Paris, served to inspire the group's interest in science and formalize their activities. While in Paris, Graindorge attends the scientific-themed meetings of the home of Melchisédech Thévenot. At the Thévenot, Graindorge witnessed dissections by the noted anatomist Nicholas Steno and became even more convinced of the importance of experiment-based knowledge. He began corresponding to Huet about what he was seeing in Paris, which Huet used as a basis for the programs at the academy in Caen. He also became convinced that a research-based, cooperative society was the best way to understanding scientific truths. The best forum for this was the academy, with information and experience being shared by both the individuals within the academy as well as between other academies throughout Europe.

Graindorge returned to Caen in April, 1666, shortly after Huet left, and headed up the fledgling organization in Huet's absence. The membership at this time was made up of, in addition to Graindorge and Huet:

- Charles Busnel
- Jean Gosslin, le chevalier de Villions
- Nicolas Croixmare, sieur de Lasson
- Pierre Hauton
- Matthieu Maheust de Vaucoulers

Given the social hierarchy present in France at the time, Graindorge initially had a difficult time organizing the group under his leadership. He began to use the knowledge he gained in Paris to direct the work of the group, focusing on natural phenomena and animals, such as the causes of dew, snakes and the effects of their venom, as well as investigations of the circulatory system. Other members also began to share their experiments and discoveries, such as Vaucoulers, who worked on the weighing air and developed an early version of the barometer. However, while Graindorge and to a lesser extent, Vaucoulers, worked on new experiments and investigations, the academy began to deteriorate. Huet's return to Caen in January 1667 revitalized the academy, as did the news that the academy would be under the protection of the royal intendant for Lower Normandy, Guy Chamillart, upon Huet's departure from Caen in October, 1667. The academy also grew with the addition of three new members, Jacques Savary, sieur de Courtsigny; Jacques Chasles; and Pierre Cally.

== Royal recognition of the Academy (1667–1668) ==
In January, 1668, Chamillart, now acting as chief of the academy, obtained the personal recognition of the academy by Louis XIV as a royal institution, as well as the agreement of the Académie des Sciences in Paris for cooperation, and the promise of royal funding. The combination of royal recognition and funding, as well as inter-academic cooperation made it one to the most important scientific institutions in Europe. However, the royal recognition did not solve the confusion over who was to direct the work of the academy, as Chamillart's priority was his job as a regional bureaucrat, not the patron of a new scientific organization. To that end, he recommended that the Academy begin to work on regional and municipal problems, such as draining local swamps and constructing fountains. However, the membership of the academy recoiled against these requests, particularly as they did not initially come with any additional funding from Chamillart or the crown. Instead, the members wished to focus on more empirical scientific program, and provided a list to Chamillart at one of the first meetings he attended. The listing can roughly be broken down into four areas:

- Astronomy
- Civil Engineering
- Metallurgy (and the development of scientific instruments)
- Anatomy

Camillart agreed to this list, which effectively reorganized the academy and encouraged the individual members to pursue their own ideas, rather than work as a collective. There was some success in the areas listed, such as in civil engineering, with experiments in the desalinization of seawater and a project to widen the channel in the local river, and with scientific instruments, such as Vaucoulers barometer and new design for a marine chronometer by Villons. The greatest success continued to be in the academy's anatomy program, which produced two volumes of illustrated dissection reports that were submitted to and praised by the Académie Royale in Paris in 1667 and 1668.

While in Paris, Huet learned of the changes to the academy and became concerned about the direction of the group. He became reengaged and presented a new plan for the work of the academy to both the court and the Académie Royale in January 1668. Now, the focus would go back to empirical research, particularly dissections, as well as continuing to pursue the desalinization of seawater. The effectively displaced Chamillart and replaced Huet as chief of the academy.

== 1668–1672 ==
After Huet returned as chief, the academy began a fruitful period of work, and began to be recognized by scholars throughout Europe, particularly in England, where the members of the Royal Academy were interested in the effects of royal support on science in France. Dissections of animals, particularly sea creatures, taking advantage of Caen's proximity to the water, as well as the desalinization project continued. However, Huet again left Caen and the group's participation began to drop off, leaving the academy on the brink of failure. In November, 1668, Chamillart reappeared and retained royal funding for the academy, which reenergized the group. The seawater desalinization program was also completed and presented to the Académie Royal, prompting additional funding by the court. This funding brought additional problems, as it removed Huet as the major patron, prompting Huet to charge the academy rent for its meeting space in his home. The members also began to argue over how the remaining funds should be spent, which further escalated tensions between Graindorge and the other members. A delay in receiving the royal funds, as well as difficulties in establishing a regular meeting place, caused the group to begin to break apart. In early 1672, Graindorge attempted to reunite the group around a new project, a study of the scoter that would disprove the theory that the birds come from the barnacles of ship, a belief also promoted by the church. He worked on the project himself, wrote up his findings, and had Chamillart take them to Paris for submission to the Académie Royal and the court, which rejected his submission. This prompted the court to cease funding the academy, causing it to disband in late 1672.

== Legacy ==
In addition to being the first scientific society outside of Paris to gain a royal charter, the Académie de Physique is also best known for its submissions to the Académie Royale in both anatomy and technological projects.

== See also ==
- Académie des Sciences, Arts et Belles-Lettres de Caen

== Bibliography ==
- Brennan, Kathleen Stern. "Culture in the Cities: Provincial Academies During the Early Years of Louis XIV's Reign," Canadian Journal of History Vol. 38, No. 1 (April, 2003).
- Brown, Harcourt. Scientific Organizations in 17th Century France. New York: Russell & Russell, 1967.
- Lux, David, Patronage and Royal Science in Seventeenth Century France: The Académie de Physique in Caen. Ithaca: Cornell University Press, 1989.
- Shelford, April. Transforming the Republic of Letters: Pierre Daniel Huet and European Intellectual Life, 1650-1720. Rochester: University of Rochester Press, 2007.
