= Longvilliers, Yvelines =

Longvilliers
- Commune
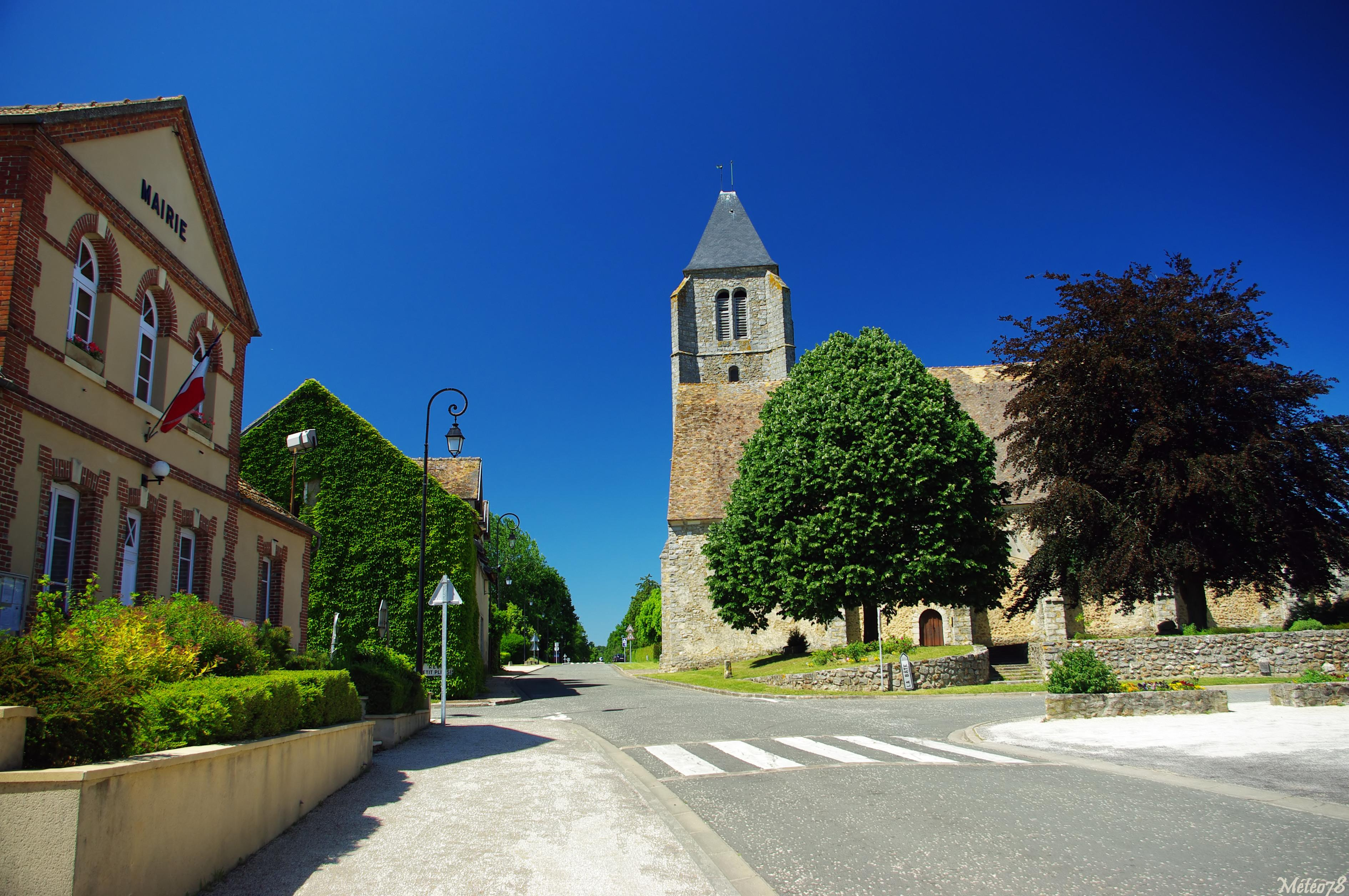
- The town hall and church in the centre of Longvilliers
- Location of Longvilliers
- Location within France Location within Île-de-France (region)
- Coordinates: 48°34′47″N 1°59′34″E
- Country: France
- Region: Île-de-France
- Department: Yvelines
- Arrondissement: Rambouillet
- Canton: Rambouillet
- Intercommunality: CA Rambouillet Territoires

Government
  - Mayor (2020–2026): Maurice Chanclud
- Area^{1}: 13.91 km^{2} (5.37 sq mi)
- Elevation: 91 m (299 ft)
- Highest elevation: 160 m (520 ft)
- Lowest elevation: 79 m (259 ft)
- Population (2023): 496
  - Density: 35.7/km^{2} (92.4/sq mi)
- Time zone: UTC+01:00 (CET)
  - Summer (DST): UTC+02:00 (CEST)
- INSEE/Postal code: 78349 /78730
- ^{1} French Land Register data, which excludes lakes, ponds, glaciers > 1 km^{2} (0.386 sq mi or 247 acres) and river estuaries.

Longvilliers (French pronunciation: [lɔ̃vilje]) is a commune in the Yvelines department in the Île-de-France region in north-central France. With a population of 501 in 2021, the median age was 43 years. The average income per capita was €34,010, which was above the national average ( €20,590).

== See also ==
- Communes of the Yvelines department
