= Daniel Tilenus =

German-French Protestant theologian

Daniel Tilenus (also Tilenius) (1563 – 1633) was a German-French Protestant theologian. Initially a Calvinist, he became a prominent and influential Arminian teaching at the Academy of Sedan. He was an open critic of the Synod of Dort of 1618-9.

== Background ==
He was born in Silesia. Coming to France around 1590, he was naturalised by Henry IV. Lord Herbert of Cherbury, who gave Tilenus his De Veritate, took his original name to be Tieleners.

== Controversies ==
A divisive controversy with Pierre Du Moulin broke out in 1612. They had earlier, in 1601, been allies on the Huguenot side of a public disputation against the Catholic Jacques-Davy Duperron and others. Du Moulin's view was that the christological attitude of Tilenus endangered the doctrine of justification; the matter became a very public split among Huguenots. James I of England exerted himself to restore Protestant unity in France, working through the Huguenot aristocrats Henri de La Tour d'Auvergne, Duke of Bouillon and Philippe de Mornay, and also his own envoys David Home and Thomas Edmondes. The issue was patched up by 1615.

At Sedan Andrew Melville arrived in about 1612 from Scotland (via the Tower of London) and became a difficult colleague, sharing in the theology teaching. In April 1620 Tilenus set up, at L'Isle, near Orléans, a debate with John Cameron, on the conclusions at Dort. Cameron published his version as Amica collatio de gratia et voluntatis humanae concursu in vocatione (1622).

== Later life ==
Later in 1620, Tilenus was finally forced out from Sedan by general hostility. He was on friendly terms with Hugo Grotius; they shared a house in 1622/3 in the Rue de Condé, Paris. He was also close to the philosopher Walter Donaldson.

Tilenus went to England; there he published against presbyterianism. in Paraenesis ad Scotos Genevensis disciplinae zelotas. He was pursued by a personal attack by James Sempill, a friend of Melville. David Calderwood in his Altare Damascenum (1623) attacked Tilenus; Gisbertus Voetius also attacked Tilenus, and was noted by Grotius.
