= Académie des Sciences, Arts et Belles-Lettres de Caen =

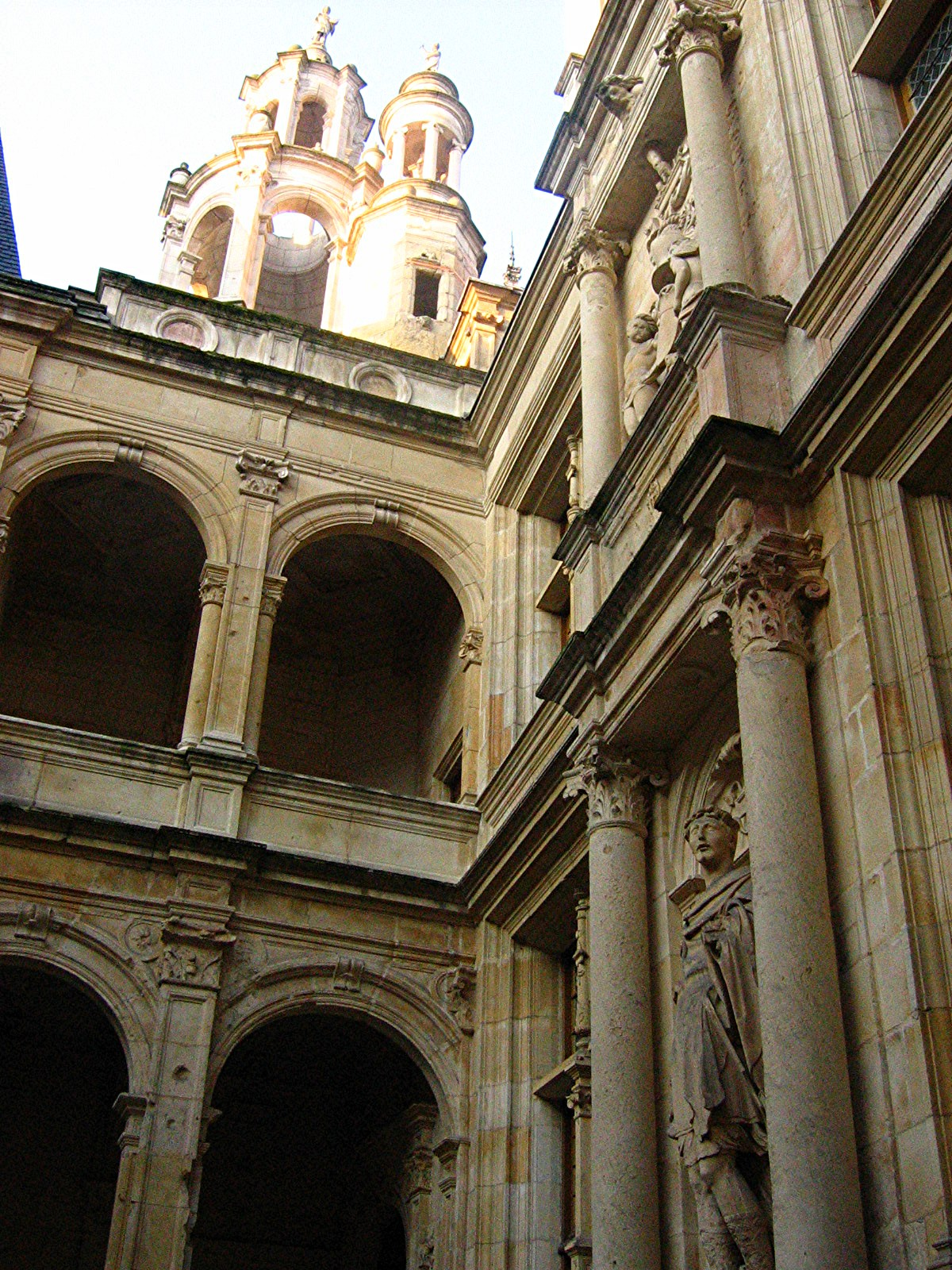
The Hôtel d'Escoville.

The Académie des Sciences, Arts et Belles-Lettres de Caen was founded in Caen (Normandy) by Jacques Moisant de Brieux in 1652.

The Académie de Caen was the first academy of literature to be founded in France, after the French Academy. It also was the first French Academy of Physics (Académie de Physique) in France (1662), four years before the founding of the French Academy of Sciences in Paris. Samuel Bochart, Pierre-Daniel Huet, Jean Regnault de Segrais and Antoine Garaby de La Luzerne were some of its first members.

== History ==
The well-read public of Caen was in the habit of conversing about public affairs at the Place St. Pierre on Mondays, on the day when the mail would arrive. Being frequently disturbed by the inclement weather, Moisant de Brieux endeavored to remedy their problem by opening to them his hotel d'Escoville.

In its beginnings, the assembly merely read La Gazette and discussed current news. Soon, it was to debate about literary and scientific subjects. Starting from 1652, the Academy of Caen had become a learned society chaired by Moisant de Brieux until his death in 1674. Jean Regnault de Segrais then take over, welcoming in turn the Academy in his home, from 1685 onward until his own death in March 1701.

The Academy then underwent a four-year hiatus until 1705, when Jean-Claude Croisilles, Jean Regnault de Segrais' brother-in-law, sheltered it in his house. On that year, the existence of the Academy's legal existence, as "Académie royale des Belles-Lettres", was confirmed by patent letters from the king.

Having experienced another interruption, owing to a disagreement with its host, the Academy had to wait for the Paul d'Albert de Luynes, Bishop of Bayeux's hospitality. Now free to meet again in the hall of the bishop's palace, the Academy was to experience another interruption. Upon learning it had elected Protestants, the bishop bent over backwards to put his dissatisfaction with the Academy across with a serious affront: after convening a special meeting regarding a critical matter, he failed to show up. It turned out the matter in question was a simple chess game.

When the French Revolution did away with all Academies, the Academy of Caen was no exception, and it would not to be restored until 12 December 1800, when General Dugua, then prefect of Calvados, brought it back to life under the name of "Lycée de Caen". It then became "Société académique", and finally "Académie des Sciences, Arts et Belles-Lettres" in 1801.

A decree dated 10 August 1853 has granted the Académie des Sciences, Arts et Belles-Lettres de Caen public utility status.

== Venues ==
- 1652-1682: Hôtel d'Escoville
- 1685-1701: Regnault Segrais Townhouse
- 1701-1714: Jean-Claude de Croisilles Townhouse
- 1731-1753: Palace of the bishops of Bayeux
- 1753-1792: Hôtel d'Escoville
- Prefecture
- Pavillon des sociétés savantes
- Current headquarters: Hôtel d'Escoville

== Members of the Academy of Caen ==
André-Marie Ampère - Samuel Bochart - Jean-Jacques Boisard - Adolphe Brongniart - Jacques de Callières - Pierre Chaunu - François Coppée - J. Hector St. John de Crèvecœur - Pierre Daru - Paul Deschanel - René-Nicolas Dufriche Desgenettes - Jules Dumont d'Urville - Pierre Samuel du Pont de Nemours - Léonce Élie de Beaumont - Charles-Michel de l'Épée - Octave Feuillet - Camille Flammarion - Augustin Fresnel - Antoine Galland - Henri Joseph Eugène Gouraud - Georges Goyau - Émile Guimet - François Guizot - Claude-Adrien Helvétius - François Honorat de Beauvilliers - Pierre-Daniel Huet - Gervais de La Rue - Bernard Germain de Lacépède - Alphonse de Lamartine - Pierre-Simon Laplace - Urbain Le Verrier - François Magendie - Étienne-Jules Marey - Henri Poincaré - Jean Regnault de Segrais - Jean II Restout - Léopold Sédar Senghor - Jules Simon - Alexis de Tocqueville - Raymond Triboulet
