= Lewis Du Moulin =

French Huguenot physician and controversialist

Lewis Du Moulin (Ludovicus Molinaeus; pseudonym: Ludiomaeus Colvinus; 1606–1680) was a French Huguenot physician and controversialist, who settled in England. He became Camden Professor of History at the University of Oxford.

== Life ==
He was born in Paris, the son of theologian Pierre Du Moulin, and brother of Wolfgang Du Mulin, Peter Du Moulin. He qualified M.D. at the University of Leiden, and came to England to practice medicine as a young man.

He was a moderate critic of episcopacy, identified as an Erastian. He was on good terms with John Owen and Richard Baxter, but also Joseph Hall.

He obtained the Camden Professorship in 1646 after petitioning Parliament. He was ejected from the position in 1660.

== Works ==
- Vox populi (1641) as Irenaus Philadelphus
- Aytomaxia, or, the self-contradiction of some that contend about church-government (1643) as Ireneus Philalethes
- The power of the Christian magistrate in sacred things (1650)
- Morum exemplar seu caracteres (1654)
- Paraenesis ad aedificatores imperii in imperio (1656)
- Of the Right of Churches (1658)
- Kern der Alchemie (1750) Digital edition by the University and State Library Düsseldorf
