= Pierre Du Moulin =

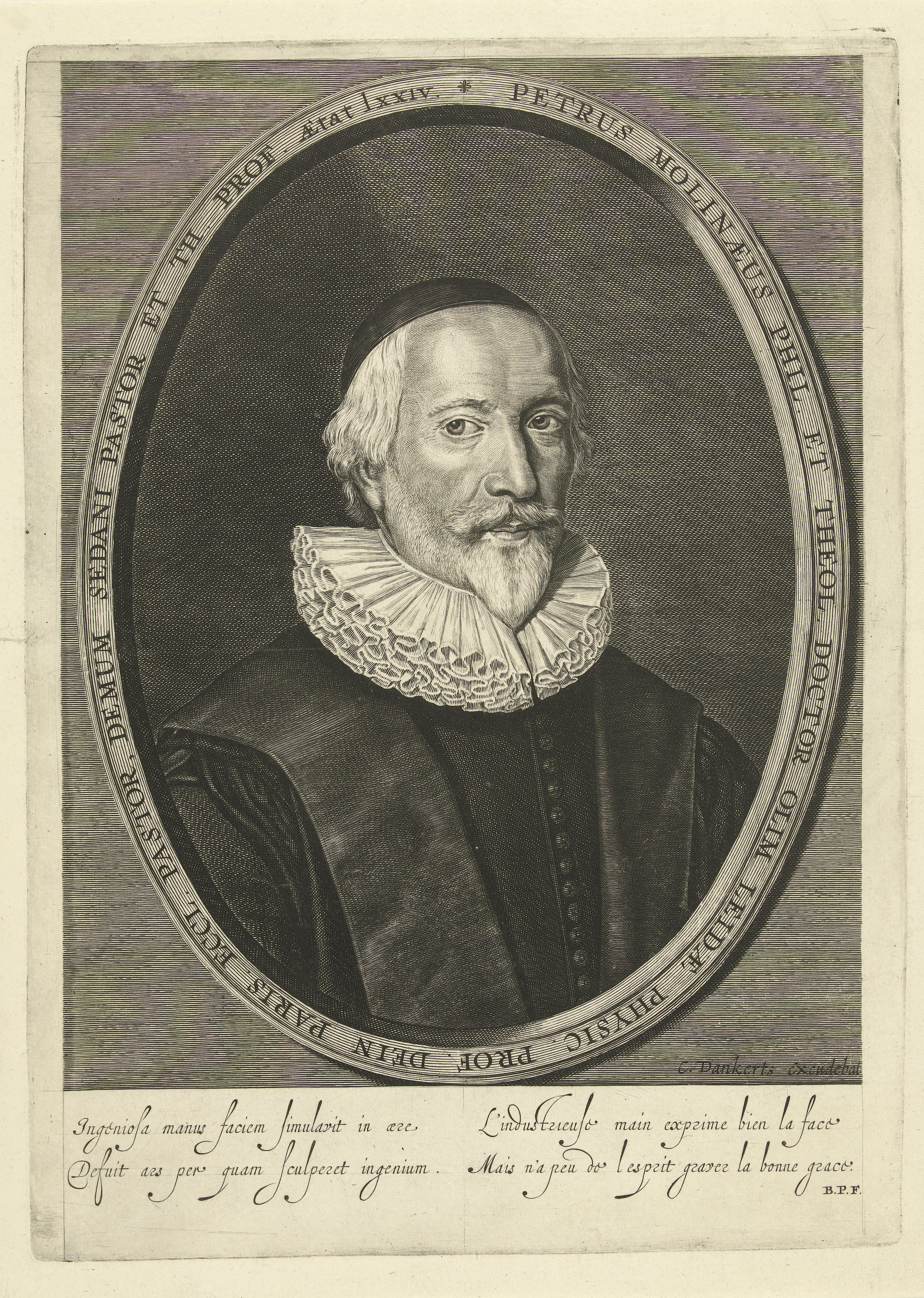
Pierre Dumoulin (Cornelis Danckerts the Elder, 1630s)

Pierre Du Moulin (Latinized as Petrus Molinaeus; 16 October 1568 – 10 March 1658) was a Huguenot minister in France who also resided in England for some years.

== Life ==
Born in Buhy in 1568, he was the son of Joachim Du Moulin, a Protestant minister in the Orléans area. Pierre was educated at the Protestant Academy of Sedan and subsequently trained for the ministry in London and Cambridge. In 1592 he moved to the University of Leiden where he taught for several years. In 1598 he returned to France and became a minister of the Huguenot church in Paris and Charenton. Du Moulin returned to England in 1615 at the invitation of King James I. Through the King he was made a D.D. at Cambridge and was appointed a prebendary at Canterbury Cathedral in 1615 (Stall IV). (Note: He is recorded as Petrus Molines and Petrus Du Molin in the Clergy of the Church of England database project.) In 1621 his situation in France became dangerous and he moved back to Sedan, where he taught at the academy. In 1624 he returned to England, where he obtained an ecclesiastical sinecure from King James. He returned to Sedan in 1625 and died there in 1658.

== Works ==
He was a prolific author, penning a critique of the Roman Catholic Mass based on the Bible, Anatomie de la Messe, and a defense of the French Reformed Confession of Faith against its Jesuit detractors, Bouclier de la Foi. An English translation of his Tirannie que les papes ont exercé depuis quelque siècles sur les roys d'Angleterre [Tyranny that the Popes exercised for some centuries over the kings of England] was published posthumously in 1674 by his son Peter Du Moulin.

In September, 1610, the biting satire Anti-Coton, in which it is proved that the Jesuits are guilty of parricide against Henri IV was followed by many pamphlets for and against the Jesuits. The Anti-Coton pamphlet attacked the Jesuits, and especially Father Pierre Coton, the confessor of Henry IV, of whose murder the Jesuits had been accused by their enemies. Daurignac says (Hist. Soc. Jesus, vol. i., p. 295) that this pamphlet was attributed to Pierre Du Moulin.

== Family ==
Wolfgang Du Moulin, Lewis Du Moulin and Peter Du Moulin were his sons.
