= Jean Regnault de Segrais =

French poet and novelist (1624–1701)

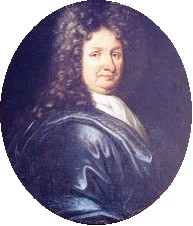
Jean Renaud de Segrais

Jean Regnault de Segrais (22 August 1624, Caen – 25 March 1701) was a French poet and novelist born in Caen. He was elected a member of the Académie française in 1662.
