= List of members of the Académie française =

This is a list of members of the Académie française (French Academy) by seat number. The primary professions of the academicians are noted. The dates shown indicate the terms of the members, who generally serve for life. Some, however, were "excluded" during the reorganisations of 1803 and 1816 and at other times.

== List of current members ==
List of current members of the Académie française
Seat	Name	Elected	Birth date and age
1	Claude Dagens	2008	20 May 1940 (age 85)
2	Dany Laferrière	2013	13 April 1953 (age 73)
3	Boualem Sansal	2026	15 October 1949 (age 76)
4	Jean-Luc Marion	2008	3 July 1946 (age 79)
5	Andreï Makine	2016	10 September 1957 (age 68)
6	Christian Jambet	2024	23 April 1949 (age 77)
7	Jules Hoffmann	2012	2 August 1941 (age 84)
8	Daniel Rondeau	2019	7 May 1948 (age 77)
9	Patrick Grainville	2018	1 June 1947 (age 78)
10	Vacant since the death of Florence Delay.		
11	Éric Neuhoff	2025	4 July 1956 (age 69)
12	Chantal Thomas	2021	20 January 1945 (age 81)
13	Maurizio Serra	2020	3 June 1955 (age 70)
14	Florian Zeller	2025	28 June 1979 (age 46)
15	Frédéric Vitoux	2001	19 August 1944 (age 81)
16	Raphaël Gaillard	2024	1 June 1976 (age 49)
17	Erik Orsenna	1998	22 March 1947 (age 79)
18	Vacant since the death of Mario Vargas Llosa.		
19	Sylviane Agacinski	2023	4 May 1945 (age 80)
20	Vacant since the death of Angelo Rinaldi.		
21	Alain Finkielkraut	2014	30 June 1949 (age 76)
22	Alain Aspect	2025	15 June 1947 (age 78)
23	Pierre Rosenberg	1995	13 April 1936 (age 90)
24	François Sureau	2020	19 September 1957 (age 68)
25	Dominique Fernandez	2007	25 August 1929 (age 96)
26	Jean-Marie Rouart	1997	8 April 1943 (age 83)
27	Vacant since the death of Pierre Nora.		
28	Jean-Christophe Rufin	2008	28 June 1952 (age 73)
29	Amin Maalouf	2011	25 February 1949 (age 77)
30	Danièle Sallenave	2011	28 October 1940 (age 85)
31	Michael Edwards	2013	29 April 1938 (age 88)
32	Pascal Ory	2021	31 July 1948 (age 77)
33	Dominique Bona	2013	29 July 1953 (age 72)
34	François Cheng	2002	30 August 1929 (age 96)
35	Antoine Compagnon	2022	20 July 1950 (age 75)
36	Barbara Cassin	2018	24 October 1947 (age 78)
37	Michel Zink	2017	5 May 1945 (age 80)
38	Marc Lambron	2014	4 February 1957 (age 69)
39	Jean Clair	2008	20 October 1940 (age 85)
40	Xavier Darcos	2013	14 July 1947 (age 78)

== Seat 1 ==
1. Pierre Séguier, 1635–1643, politician and magistrate
2. Claude Bazin de Bezons, 1643–1684, lawyer
3. Nicolas Boileau-Despréaux, 1684–1711, poet
4. Jean d'Estrées, 1711–1718, ecclesiastic and politician
5. Marc-René d'Argenson, 1718–1721, politician
6. Jean-Joseph Languet de Gergy, 1721–1753, ecclesiastic
7. Georges-Louis Leclerc, Comte de Buffon, 1753–1788, essayist
8. Félix Vicq-d'Azyr, 1788–1794, medical doctor
9. François-Urbain Domergue, 1803–1810, grammarian
10. Ange-François Fariau, 1810, poet and translator
11. François-Auguste Parseval-Grandmaison, 1811–1834, poet
12. Narcisse-Achille de Salvandy, 1835–1856, politician and historian
13. Émile Augier, 1857–1889, poet and playwright
14. Charles de Freycinet, 1890–1923, politician and physicist
15. Charles Émile Picard, 1924–1941, mathematician
16. Louis de Broglie, 1944–1987, physicist and mathematician
17. Michel Debré, 1988–1996, politician
18. François Furet, 1997, historian
19. René Rémond, 1998–2007, historian
20. Claude Dagens, elected 2008, ecclesiastic

== Seat 2 ==
1. Valentin Conrart, 1634–1675, poet and grammarian
2. Toussaint Rose, 1675–1701, orator
3. Louis de Sacy, 1701–1727, lawyer
4. Charles de Secondat, baron de Montesquieu, 1728–1755, magistrate and philosopher
5. Jean-Baptiste Vivien de Châteaubrun, 1755–1775, poet and playwright
6. François-Jean de Chastellux, 1775–1788, military officer
7. Aimar-Charles-Marie de Nicolaï, 1788–1794, magistrate
8. Nicolas François de Neufchâteau, 1803–1828, politician and philologist
9. Pierre-Antoine Lebrun, 1828–1873, politician and poet
10. Alexandre Dumas, fils, 1874–1895, playwright and novelist
11. André Theuriet, 1896–1907, novelist and poet
12. Jean Richepin, 1908–1926, poet and novelist
13. Émile Mâle, 1927–1954, art historian
14. François Albert-Buisson, 1955–1961, magistrate and politician
15. Marc Boegner, 1962–1970, ecclesiastic and theologian
16. René de La Croix de Castries, 1972–1986, historian
17. André Frossard, 1987–1995, essayist and journalist
18. Hector Bianciotti, 1996–2012, novelist
19. Dany Laferrière, elected 2013, writer

== Seat 3 ==
1. Jacques de Serisay, 1634–1653, poet
2. Paul-Philippe de Chaumont, 1654–1697, ecclesiastic
3. Louis Cousin, 1697–1707, historian and journalist
4. Jacques-Louis de Valon, marquis de Mimeure, 1707–1719, poet and translator
5. Nicolas Gédoyn, 1719–1744, ecclesiastic
6. François-Joachim de Pierre de Bernis, 1744–1794, ecclesiastic
7. Roch-Ambroise Cucurron Sicard, 1803–1822, ecclesiastic and grammarian
8. Denis-Luc Frayssinous, 1822–1841, ecclesiastic
9. Étienne-Denis Pasquier, 1842–1862, politician
10. Jules Armand Dufaure, 1863–1881, politician and lawyer
11. Victor Cherbuliez, 1881–1899, novelist and playwright
12. Émile Faguet, 1900–1916, literary critic and historian
13. Georges Clemenceau, 1918–1929, politician and doctor
14. André Chaumeix, 1930–1955, journalist and critic
15. Jérôme Carcopino, 1955–1970, historian and archaeologist
16. Roger Caillois, 1971–1978, essayist and sociologist
17. Marguerite Yourcenar, 1980–1987, novelist and essayist
18. Jean-Denis Bredin, 1989–2021, lawyer and essayist
19. Boualem Sansal, elected 2026, novelist

== Seat 4 ==
1. Jean Desmarets, 1634–1676, poet and novelist
2. Jean-Jacques de Mesmes, 1676–1688, magistrate
3. Jean Testu de Mauroy, 1688–1706, ecclesiastic
4. Camille le Tellier de Louvois, 1706–1718, ecclesiastic
5. Jean Baptiste Massillon, 1718–1742, ecclesiastic
6. Louis Jules Mancini Mazarini, Duc de Nivernais, 1742–1798, politician and poet
7. Gabriel-Marie Legouvé, 1803–1812, poet
8. Alexandre-Vincent Pineux Duval, 1812–1842, poet and playwright
9. Pierre-Simon Ballanche, 1842–1847, philosopher
10. Jean Vatout, 1848, poet
11. Alexis Guignard, comte de Saint-Priest, 1849–1851, politician and historian
12. Antoine Pierre Berryer, 1852–1868, lawyer
13. François-Joseph de Champagny, 1869–1882, historian
14. Charles de Mazade, 1882–1893, poet and critic
15. José-Maria de Heredia, 1894–1905, poet
16. Maurice Barrès, 1906–1923, novelist and politician
17. Louis Bertrand, 1925–1941, novelist and historian
18. Jean Tharaud, 1946–1952, novelist
19. Alphonse Juin, 1952–1967, soldier
20. Pierre Emmanuel, 1968–1984, poet
21. Jean Hamburger, 1985–1992, doctor and essayist
22. Albert Decourtray, 1993–1994, ecclesiastic
23. Jean-Marie Lustiger, 1995–2007, ecclesiastic
24. Jean-Luc Marion, elected 2008, philosopher and academic

== Seat 5 ==
1. Jean Ogier de Gombauld, 1634–1666, poet and playwright
2. Paul Tallement le Jeune, 1666–1712, ecclesiastic
3. Antoine Danchet, 1712–1748, playwright and poet
4. Jean-Baptiste-Louis Gresset, 1748–1777, playwright
5. Claude-François-Xavier Millot, 1777–1785, ecclesiastic
6. André Morellet, 1785–1819, ecclesiastic
7. Pierre-Édouard Lémontey, 1819–1826, politician and lawyer
8. Joseph Fourier, 1826–1830, mathematician and physicist
9. Victor Cousin, 1830–1867, politician and philosopher
10. Jules Favre, 1867–1880, politician and lawyer
11. Edmond Rousse, 1880–1906, lawyer
12. Pierre de Ségur, 1907–1916, historian
13. Robert de Flers, 1920–1927, playwright and journalist
14. Louis Madelin, 1927–1956, historian
15. Robert Kemp, 1956–1959, literary and dramatic critic
16. René Huyghe, 1960–1997, art historian and essayist
17. Georges Vedel, 1998–2002, magistrate
18. Assia Djebar, 2005–2015, author
19. Andreï Makine, elected 2016, author

== Seat 6 ==
1. François le Métel de Boisrobert, 1634–1662, ecclesiastic and poet
2. Jean Regnault de Segrais, 1662–1701, poet and novelist
3. Jean Galbert de Campistron, 1701–1723, playwright
4. Philippe Néricault Destouches, 1723–1754, playwright and diplomat
5. Louis de Boissy, 1754–1758, poet
6. Jean-Baptiste de La Curne de Sainte-Palaye, 1758–1781, archaeologist
7. Sébastien-Roch-Nicolas (Chamfort), 1781–1794, playwright and publisher
8. Pierre Louis Roederer, 1803–1815, (Note: Although Roederer lived until 1835, he was deprived of all offices and dignities on the restoration of the Bourbons to power.) politician and lawyer
9. Pierre Marc Gaston de Lévis, Duke of Lévis, 1816–1830, politician
10. Philippe Paul, comte de Ségur, 1830–1873, diplomat and historian
11. Charles de Viel-Castel, 1873–1887, diplomat
12. Edmond Jurien de La Gravière, 1888–1892, admiral
13. Ernest Lavisse, 1892–1922, historian
14. Georges de Porto-Riche, 1923–1930, playwright and poet
15. Pierre Benoît, 1931–1962, novelist
16. Jean Paulhan, 1963–1968, literary and art critic
17. Eugène Ionesco, 1970–1994, playwright
18. Marc Fumaroli, 1995–2020, historian and essayist
19. Christian Jambet, elected 2024, philosopher

== Seat 7 ==
1. Jean Chapelain, 1634–1674, royal advisor
2. Isaac de Benserade, 1674–1691, poet and playwright
3. Étienne Pavillon, 1691–1705, lawyer and poet
4. Fabio Brulart de Sillery, 1705–1714, ecclesiastic and poet
5. Henri-Jacques Nompar de Caumont, duc de La Force, 1715–1726, economist
6. Jean-Baptiste de Mirabaud, 1726–1760, translator
7. Claude-Henri Watelet, 1760–1786, painter
8. Michel-Jean Sedaine, 1786–1793, poet and playwright
9. Jean-François Collin d'Harleville, 1803–1806, playwright and poet
10. Pierre Daru, 1806–1829, politician and historian
11. Alphonse de Lamartine, 1829–1869, politician and poet
12. Émile Ollivier, 1870–1913, politician and lawyer
13. Henri Bergson, 1914–1941, philosopher
14. Édouard Le Roy, 1945–1954, philosopher and mathematician
15. Henri Petiot (Daniel-Rops), 1955–1965, poet and novelist
16. Pierre-Henri Simon, 1966–1972, literary historian and novelist
17. André Roussin, 1973–1987, playwright
18. Jacqueline de Romilly, 1988–2010, philologist and essayist
19. Jules Hoffmann, elected 2012, biologist

== Seat 8 ==
1. Claude de Malleville, 1634–1647, poet
2. Jean Ballesdens, 1648–1675, lawyer
3. Géraud de Cordemoy, 1675–1684, philosopher and historian
4. Jean-Louis Bergeret, 1684–1694, lawyer
5. Charles-Irénée Castel de Saint-Pierre, 1694–1743, ecclesiastic
6. Pierre Louis Maupertuis, 1743–1759, astronomer
7. Jean-Jacques Lefranc, Marquis de Pompignan, 1759–1784, magistrate and economist
8. Jean-Sifrein Maury, 1784–1793, ecclesiastic and politician
9. Michel-Louis-Étienne Regnaud de Saint-Jean d'Angély, 1803–1814, politician and lawyer
10. Pierre-Simon Laplace, 1816–1827, politician and mathematician
11. Pierre Paul Royer-Collard, 1827–1845, politician
12. Charles de Rémusat, 1846–1875, politician and philosopher
13. Jules Simon, 1875–1896, politician and philosopher
14. Adrien Albert Marie de Mun, 1897–1914, politician and soldier
15. Alfred-Henri-Marie Baudrillart, 1918–1942, ecclesiastic and historian
16. Octave Aubry, 1946–1946, historian and bureaucrat
17. Édouard Herriot, 1946–1957, politician and literary historian
18. Jean Rostand, 1959–1977, biologist and philosopher
19. Michel Déon, 1978–2016, novelist
20. Daniel Rondeau, elected 2019, writer and diplomat

== Seat 9 ==
1. Nicolas Faret, 1634–1646, poet
2. Pierre du Ryer, 1646–1658, playwright
3. César d'Estrées, 1658–1714, ecclesiastic and politician
4. Victor-Marie d'Estrées, 1715–1737, politician and soldier
5. Charles Armand René de La Trémoille, 1738–1741, aristocrat
6. Armand de Rohan-Soubise, 1741–1756, ecclesiastic
7. Antoine de Montazet, 1756–1788, ecclesiastic
8. Stanislas de Boufflers, 1788–1815, poet
9. Pierre-Marie-François Baour-Lormian, 1815–1854, poet and playwright
10. François Ponsard, 1855–1867, playwright
11. Joseph Autran, 1868–1877, poet
12. Victorien Sardou, 1877–1908, playwright
13. Marcel Prévost, 1909–1941, novelist
14. Émile Henriot, 1945–1961, novelist and literary critic
15. Jean Guéhenno, 1962–1978, essayist
16. Alain Decaux, 1979–2016, historian
17. Patrick Grainville, elected 2018, novelist

== Seat 10 ==
1. Antoine Godeau, 1634–1672, ecclesiastic and poet
2. Esprit Fléchier, 1672–1710, ecclesiastic
3. Henri de Nesmond, 1710–1727, ecclesiastic
4. Jean-Jacques Amelot de Chaillou, 1727–1749, politician
5. Charles Louis Auguste Fouquet, duc de Belle-Isle, 1749–1761, politician and soldier
6. Nicolas-Charles-Joseph Trublet, 1761–1770, ecclesiastic
7. Jean François de Saint-Lambert, 1770–1793, poet and philosopher
8. Hugues-Bernard Maret, duc de Bassano, 1803–1815, politician and diplomat
9. Joseph Lainé, 1816–1835, politician and magistrate
10. Emmanuel Dupaty, 1836–1851, poet and playwright
11. Alfred de Musset, 1852–1857, playwright and poet
12. Victor de Laprade, 1858–1883, poet
13. François Coppée, 1884–1908, poet and novelist
14. Jean Aicard, 1909–1921, poet and novelist
15. Camille Jullian, 1924–1933, historian and philologist
16. Léon Bérard, 1934–1960, politician and lawyer
17. Jean Guitton, 1961–1999, theologian and philosopher
18. Florence Delay, 2000–2025, novelist and playwright

== Seat 11 ==
1. Philippe Habert, 1634–1638, poet
2. Jacques Esprit, 1639–1678, politician
3. Jacques-Nicolas Colbert, 1678–1707, ecclesiastic
4. Claude-François Fraguier, 1707–1728, ecclesiastic
5. Charles d'Orléans de Rothelin, 1728–1744, ecclesiastic
6. Gabriel Girard, 1744–1748, ecclesiastic
7. Marc-Antoine-René de Voyer d'Argenson de Paulmy, 1748–1787, politician
8. Henri-Cardin-Jean-Baptiste d'Aguesseau, 1787–1826, politician
9. Charles Brifaut, 1826–1857, poet and playwright
10. Jules Sandeau, 1858–1883, novelist and playwright
11. Edmond François Valentin About, 1884–1885, novelist and playwright
12. Léon Say, 1886–1896, politician and economist
13. Albert Vandal, 1896–1910, historian
14. Denys Cochin, 1911–1922, politician
15. Georges Goyau, 1922–1939, historian
16. Paul Hazard, 1940–1944, historian and philosopher
17. Maurice Garçon, 1946–1967, lawyer, novelist and historian
18. Paul Morand, 1968–1976, diplomat, novelist, playwright and poet
19. Alain Peyrefitte, 1977–1999, scholar and politician
20. Gabriel de Broglie, 2001–2025, historian
21. Éric Neuhoff, elected 2025, journalist and novelist

== Seat 12 ==
1. Germain Habert, 1634–1654, ecclesiastic
2. Charles Cotin, 1655–1681, ecclesiastic
3. Louis de Courcillon, 1682–1723, ecclesiastic and politician
4. Charles Jean-Baptiste Fleuriau, 1723–1732, politician
5. Jean Terrasson, 1732–1750, ecclesiastic and philosopher
6. Claude de Thiard de Bissy, 1750–1810, soldier
7. Joseph-Alphonse Esménard, 1810–1811, politician
8. Jean Charles Dominique de Lacretelle, 1811–1855, historian
9. Jean-Baptiste Biot, 1856–1862, scientist and mathematician
10. Louis de Carné, 1863–1876, historian and politician
11. Charles Blanc, 1876–1882, art critic
12. Édouard Pailleron, 1882–1899, poet and playwright
13. Paul Hervieu, 1900–1915, novelist and playwright
14. François, Vicomte de Curel, 1918–1928, playwright
15. Charles Le Goffic, 1930–1932, novelist and historian
16. Abel Bonnard, 1932–1945, poet, novelist and politician; expelled for his collaboration with the Vichy French regime
17. Jules Romains, 1946–1972, novelist, playwright and poet
18. Jean d'Ormesson, 1973–2017, novelist
19. Chantal Thomas, elected 2021, writer and historian

== Seat 13 ==
1. Claude Gaspard Bachet de Méziriac, 1634–1638, grammarian and mathematician
2. François de La Mothe Le Vayer, 1639–1672, critic, grammarian and philosopher
3. Jean Racine, 1672–1699, playwright, mathematician, physicist and doctor
4. Jean-Baptiste-Henri de Valincour, 1699–1730, historiographer and admiral
5. Jean-François Leriget de La Faye, 1730–1731, politician
6. Prosper Jolyot de Crébillon, 1731–1762, playwright
7. Claude-Henri de Fusée de Voisenon, 1762–1775, ecclesiastic, playwright and poet
8. Jean de Dieu-Raymond de Cucé de Boisgelin, 1776–1804, ecclesiastic
9. Jean-Baptiste Dureau de la Malle, 1804–1807, translator
10. Louis-Benoît Picard, 1807–1828, comedian, poet, novelist and playwright
11. Antoine-Vincent Arnault, 1829–1834, poet, fabulist and playwright
12. Eugène Scribe, 1834–1861, playwright
13. Octave Feuillet, 1862–1890, novelist and playwright
14. Pierre Loti, 1891–1923, novelist and soldier
15. Paul-Albert Besnard, 1924–1934, painter and engraver
16. Louis Gillet, 1935–1943, historian of art and literature
17. Paul Claudel, 1946–1955, poet, playwright, novelist and diplomat
18. Wladimir d'Ormesson, 1956–1973, politician, chronicler and novelist
19. Maurice Schumann, 1974–1998, politician, essayist, journalist, novelist and historian
20. Pierre Messmer, 1999–2007, soldier and politician
21. Simone Veil, 2008–2017, lawyer and politician
22. Maurizio Serra, elected 2020, writer and diplomat

== Seat 14 ==
1. François Maynard, 1634–1646, magistrate and poet
2. Pierre Corneille, 1647–1684, playwright and lawyer
3. Thomas Corneille, 1684–1709, playwright
4. Antoine Houdar de la Motte, 1710–1731, playwright
5. Michel-Celse-Roger de Bussy-Rabutin, 1732–1736, ecclesiastic
6. Étienne Lauréault de Foncemagne, 1736–1779, ecclesiastic
7. Michel Paul Guy de Chabanon, 1779–1792, playwright
8. Jacques-André Naigeon, 1803–1810, encyclopaedist
9. Népomucène Lemercier, 1810–1840, poet and playwright
10. Victor Hugo, 1841–1885, poet, playwright and novelist
11. Leconte de Lisle, 1886–1894, poet and playwright
12. Henry Houssaye, 1894–1911, historian and novelist
13. Hubert Lyautey, 1912–1934, soldier
14. Louis Franchet d'Espèrey, 1934–1942, politician and soldier
15. Robert d'Harcourt, 1946–1965, literary historian and essayist
16. Jean Mistler, 1966–1988, novelist, essayist, literary historian, music critic and politician
17. Hélène Carrère d'Encausse, 1990–2023, historian
18. Florian Zeller, elected 2025, writer and filmmaker

== Seat 15 ==
1. Guillaume Bautru, 1634–1665, politician
2. Jacques Testu de Belval, 1665–1706, ecclesiastic and poet
3. François-Joseph de Beaupoil de Sainte-Aulaire, 1706–1742, soldier and poet
4. Jean-Jacques d'Ortous de Mairan, 1743–1771, physicist and mathematician
5. François Arnaud, 1771–1784, ecclesiastic
6. Gui-Jean-Baptiste Target, 1785–1806, magistrate
7. Jean-Sifrein Maury, 1806 - excluded by ordinance in 1816, ecclesiastic and politician
8. François-Xavier-Marc-Antoine de Montesquiou-Fézensac, 1816–1832, ecclesiastic and politician
9. Antoine Jay, 1832–1854, politician
10. Ustazade Silvestre de Sacy, 1854–1879, literary critic
11. Eugène Marin Labiche, 1880–1888, playwright and novelist
12. Henri Meilhac, 1888–1897, playwright
13. Henri Lavedan, 1898–1940, playwright and novelist
14. Ernest Seillière, 1946–1955, historian of literature and of philosophy, and essayist
15. André Chamson, 1956–1983, novelist, essayist and historian
16. Fernand Braudel, 1984–1985, historian of civilisations
17. Jacques Laurent, 1986–2000, novelist, essayist and journalist
18. Frédéric Vitoux, elected 2001, writer and journalist

== Seat 16 ==
1. Jean Sirmond, 1634–1649, historiographer
2. Jean de Montereul, 1649–1651, ecclesiastic
3. François Tallemant l'Aîné, 1651–1693, ecclesiastic
4. Simon de la Loubère, 1693–1729, diplomat and poet
5. Claude Sallier, 1729–1761, ecclesiastic and philologist
6. Jean-Gilles du Coëtlosquet, 1761–1784, ecclesiastic
7. Anne-Pierre, marquis de Montesquiou-Fézensac, 1784–1793, politician
8. Antoine-Vincent Arnault, 1803, excluded by ordinance in 1816, re-elected in 1829 to seat 13, poet, fabulist and playwright
9. Armand-Emmanuel de Vignerot du Plessis, Duc de Richelieu, 1816–1822, politician
10. Bon-Joseph Dacier, 1822–1833, philologist
11. Pierre François Tissot, 1833–1854, poet and historian
12. Félix Dupanloup, 1854–1878, ecclesiastic
13. Gaston Audiffret-Pasquier, 1878–1905, politician
14. Alexandre Ribot, 1906–1923, politician, lawyer, magistrate and jurist
15. Henri-Robert, 1923–1936, lawyer and historian
16. Charles Maurras, 1938, not excluded, but seat "declared vacant" for Vichy collaboration in 1945, journalist, politician, essayist and poet
17. Antoine de Lévis Mirepoix, 1953–1981, novelist, historian and essayist
18. Léopold Sédar Senghor, 1983–2001, head of state (Senegal), politician, poet and essayist
19. Valéry Giscard d'Estaing, 2003–2020, former president of France
20. Raphaël Gaillard, elected 2024, psychiatrist and teacher

== Seat 17 ==
1. François de Cauvigny de Colomby, 1634–1649, poet
2. François Tristan l'Hermite, 1649–1655, playwright and poet
3. Hippolyte-Jules Pilet de La Mesnardière, 1655–1663, critic, poet and historian
4. François de Beauvilliers, 1st duc de Saint-Aignan, 1663–1687, soldier
5. François-Timoléon de Choisy, 1687–1724, ecclesiastic
6. Antoine Portail, 1724–1736, politician
7. Pierre-Claude Nivelle de La Chaussée, 1736–1754, playwright
8. Jean-Pierre de Bougainville, 1754–1763, historian
9. Jean-François Marmontel, 1763–1793, philosopher and essayist
10. Louis-Marcelin de Fontanes, 1803–1821, politician, poet and journalist
11. Abel-François Villemain, 1821–1870, politician and literary critic
12. Émile Littré, 1871–1881, philologist and philosopher
13. Louis Pasteur, 1881–1895, chemist
14. Gaston Paris, 1896–1903, philologist and literary historian
15. Frédéric Masson, 1903–1923, historian
16. Georges Lecomte, 1924–1958, novelist, essayist, art critic and historian
17. Jean Delay, 1959–1987, psychiatrist, essayist and novelist
18. Jacques Cousteau, 1988–1997, oceanographer, film-maker and essayist
19. Érik Orsenna, elected 1998, politician and novelist

== Seat 18 ==
1. Jean Baudoin, 1634–1650, translator
2. François Charpentier, 1650–1702, novelist
3. Jean-François de Chamillart, 1702–1714, ecclesiastic
4. Claude Louis Hector de Villars, 1714–1734, politician and soldier
5. Honoré Armand de Villars, 1734–1770, politician
6. Étienne Charles de Loménie de Brienne, 1770–1794, ecclesiastic, politician and philosopher
7. Jean-Gérard Lacuée, count of Cessac, 1803–1841, politician
8. Alexis de Tocqueville, 1841–1859, politician
9. Jean-Baptiste Henri Lacordaire, 1860–1861, ecclesiastic
10. Albert, 4th duc de Broglie, 1862–1901, politician, diplomat and historian
11. Charles-Jean-Melchior de Vogüé, 1901–1916, archaeologist and historian
12. Ferdinand Foch, 1918–1929, soldier
13. Philippe Pétain, 1929–1945, soldier (expelled from the Academy after trial; from 1945 to 1952, the seat was vacant)
14. André François-Poncet, 1952–1978, politician and diplomat
15. Edgar Faure, 1978–1988, politician and historian
16. Michel Serres, 1990–2019, philosopher
17. Mario Vargas Llosa, 2021–2025, novelist and essayist

== Seat 19 ==
1. François de Porchères d'Arbaud, 1634–1640, poet
2. Olivier Patru, 1640–1681, lawyer
3. Nicolas Potier de Novion, 1681–1693, magistrate
4. Philippe Goibaud-Dubois, 1693–1694, translator
5. Charles Boileau, 1694–1704, ecclesiastic
6. Gaspard Abeille, 1704–1718, ecclesiastic
7. Nicolas-Hubert de Mongault, 1718–1746, ecclesiastic
8. Charles Pinot Duclos, 1746–1772, grammarian and historian
9. Nicolas Beauzée, 1772–1789, grammarian
10. Jean-Jacques Barthélemy, 1789–1795, ecclesiastic
11. Joseph Chénier, 1803–1811, poet and playwright
12. François-René de Chateaubriand, 1811–1848, politician, poet and novelist
13. Paul, 6th duc de Noailles, 1849–1885, historian
14. Édouard Hervé, 1886–1899, politician
15. Paul Deschanel, 1899–1922, politician
16. Auguste Jonnart, 1923–1927, politician, senior bureaucrat and diplomat
17. Maurice Paléologue, 1928–1944, diplomat and historian
18. Charles de Chambrun, 1946–1952, diplomat
19. Fernand Gregh, 1953–1960, poet, literary critic and historian
20. René Clair, 1960–1981, film director and novelist
21. Pierre Moinot, 1982–2007, senior bureaucrat and novelist
22. Jean-Loup Dabadie, 2008–2020, journalist, lyricist and screenwriter
23. Sylviane Agacinski, elected 2023, philosopher

== Seat 20 ==
1. Paul Hay du Chastelet, 1634–1636, lawyer
2. Nicolas Perrot d'Ablancourt, 1637–1664, translator
3. Roger de Rabutin, Comte de Bussy, 1665–1693, novelist
4. Jean-Paul Bignon, 1693–1743, ecclesiastic
5. Armand-Jérôme Bignon, 1743–1772, politician
6. Louis-Georges de Bréquigny, 1772–1795, historian
7. Ponce Denis Écouchard Lebrun, 1803–1807, poet
8. François Juste Marie Raynouard, 1807–1836, lawyer, poet and playwright
9. François Mignet, 1836–1884, historian
10. Victor Duruy, 1884–1894, politician and historian
11. Jules Lemaître, 1895–1914, playwright and critic
12. Henry Bordeaux, 1919–1963, lawyer and novelist
13. Thierry Maulnier, 1964–1988, journalist and playwright
14. José Cabanis, 1990–2000, magistrate and novelist
15. Angelo Rinaldi, 2001–2025, writer

== Seat 21 ==
1. Marin le Roy de Gomberville, 1634–1674, novelist
2. Pierre Daniel Huet, 1674–1721, ecclesiastic
3. Jean Boivin le Cadet, 1721–1726, professor
4. Paul-Hippolyte de Beauvilliers, duke of Saint-Aignan, 1726–1776, politician
5. Charles-Pierre Colardeau, 1776, poet and playwright
6. Jean-François de La Harpe, 1776–1793, poet, playwright and critic
7. Pierre Louis de Lacretelle, 1803–1824, lawyer
8. Joseph Droz, 1824–1850, philosopher and historian
9. Charles Forbes René de Montalembert, 1851–1870, philosopher
10. Henri d'Orleans, duke of Aumale, 1871–1897, soldier, politician and historian
11. Jean-Baptiste Claude Eugène Guillaume, 1898–1905, sculptor
12. Étienne Lamy, 1905–1919, essayist, politician and lawyer
13. André Chevrillon, 1920–1957, essayist and literary historian and critic
14. Marcel Achard, 1959–1974, playwright and journalist
15. Félicien Marceau, 1975–2012, playwright, novelist and essayist
16. Alain Finkielkraut, elected 2014, philosopher and essayist

== Seat 22 ==
1. Antoine Girard de Saint-Amant, 1634–1661, poet
2. Jacques Cassagne, 1662–1679, ecclesiastic and poet
3. Louis de Verjus, 1679–1709, politician
4. Jean-Antoine de Mesmes, 1710–1723, magistrate
5. Pierre-Joseph Alary, 1723–1770, ecclesiastic
6. Gabriel-Henri Gaillard, 1771–1806, ecclesiastic, historian, grammarian and journalist
7. Louis Philippe, comte de Ségur, 1806–1830, diplomat, historian, poet and playwright
8. Jean-Pons-Guillaume Viennet, 1830–1868, politician, poet and playwright
9. Joseph d'Haussonville, 1869–1884, politician and diplomat
10. Ludovic Halévy, 1884–1908, playwright, librettist and novelist
11. Eugène Brieux, 1909–1932, playwright
12. François Mauriac, 1933–1970, writer, essayist and literary critic
13. Julien Green, 1971–1998, novelist and playwright
14. René de Obaldia, 1999–2022, playwright and poet
15. Alain Aspect, elected 2025, physicist

== Seat 23 ==
1. Guillaume Colletet, 1634–1659, lawyer and playwright
2. Gilles Boileau, 1659–1669, poet
3. Jean de Montigny, 1670–1671, ecclesiastic and poet
4. Charles Perrault, 1671–1703, poet
5. Armand Gaston Maximilien de Rohan, 1703–1749, ecclesiastic and politician
6. Louis-Gui de Guérapin de Vauréal, 1749–1760, ecclesiastic and politician
7. Charles Marie de La Condamine, 1760–1774, explorer
8. Jacques Delille, 1774–1813, ecclesiastic and poet
9. François-Nicolas-Vincent Campenon, 1813–1843, poet
10. Marc Girardin, 1844–1873, politician and literary critic
11. Alfred Mézières, 1874–1915, literary historian, politician and essayist
12. René Boylesve, 1918–1926, novelist and poet
13. Abel Hermant, 1927–1945, novelist, essayist and journalist
14. Étienne Gilson, 1946–1978, philosopher
15. Henri Gouhier, 1979–1994, philosopher and literary critic
16. Pierre Rosenberg, elected 1995, art historian and essayist

== Seat 24 ==
1. Jean de Silhon, 1634–1667, politician
2. Jean-Baptiste Colbert, 1667–1683, politician
3. Jean de La Fontaine, 1684–1695, poet
4. Jules de Clérambault, 1695–1714, ecclesiastic
5. Guillaume Massieu, 1714–1722, ecclesiastic
6. Claude-François-Alexandre Houtteville, 1722–1742, ecclesiastic
7. Pierre de Marivaux, 1742–1763, playwright and novelist
8. Claude-François Lysarde de Radonvilliers, 1763–1789, ecclesiastic
9. Constantin-François Chassebœuf, 1803–1820, philosopher
10. Claude-Emmanuel de Pastoret, 1820–1840, politician, lawyer and poet
11. Louis de Beaupoil de Saint-Aulaire, 1841–1854, politician
12. Victor de Broglie, 1855–1870, politician
13. Prosper Duvergier de Hauranne, 1870–1881, politician
14. Sully Prudhomme, 1881–1907, poet and essayist
15. Henri Poincaré, 1908–1912, mathematician, astronomer, engineer and philosopher
16. Alfred Capus, 1914–1922, playwright, journalist and essayist
17. Édouard Estaunié, 1923–1942, novelist and engineer
18. Louis-Pasteur Vallery-Radot, 1944–1970, doctor
19. Étienne Wolff, 1971–1996, biologist
20. Jean-François Revel, 1997–2006, historian and essayist
21. Max Gallo, 2007–2017, journalist and novelist
22. François Sureau, elected 2020, writer

== Seat 25 ==
1. Claude de L'Estoile, 1634–1652, playwright and poet
2. Armand de Camboust, duc de Coislin, 1652–1702, soldier
3. Pierre de Camboust, duc de Coislin, 1702–1710, aristocrat
4. Henri Charles du Cambout de Coislin, 1710–1732, ecclesiastic
5. Jean-Baptiste Surian, 1733–1754, ecclesiastic
6. Jean Le Rond, dit d'Alembert, 1754–1783, philosopher and mathematician
7. Marie-Gabriel-Florent-Auguste de Choiseul-Gouffier, 1783–1793, biographer
8. Jean-Étienne-Marie Portalis, 1803–1807, politician, philosopher and lawyer
9. Pierre Laujon, 1807–1811, poet and songwriter
10. Charles-Guillaume Étienne, 1811–1816, poet and playwright, excluded by ordinance
11. Marie-Gabriel-Florent-Auguste de Choiseul-Gouffier, (2nd time), 1816–1817
12. Jean-Louis Laya, 1817–1833, poet and playwright
13. Charles Nodier, 1833–1844, novelist, poet and grammarian
14. Prosper Mérimée, 1844–1870, novelist
15. Louis de Loménie, 1871–1878, essayist
16. Hippolyte Taine, 1878–1893, essayist and historian
17. Albert Sorel, 1894–1906, historian
18. Maurice Donnay, 1907–1945, playwright
19. Marcel Pagnol, 1946–1974, playwright, film-maker and novelist
20. Jean Bernard, 1976–2006, medical doctor
21. Dominique Fernandez, elected 2007, novelist and literary critic

== Seat 26 ==
1. Amable de Bourzeys, 1634–1672, ecclesiastic and scholar
2. Jean Gallois, 1672–1707, ecclesiastic
3. Edme Mongin, 1707–1746, ecclesiastic
4. Jean Ignace de La Ville, 1746–1774, ecclesiastic and diplomat
5. Jean-Baptiste-Antoine Suard, 1774–1817, essayist
6. Jean-François Roger, 1817–1842, poet and playwright
7. Henri Patin, 1842–1876, professor
8. Marie-Louis-Antoine-Gaston Boissier, 1876–1908, historian and philologist
9. René Doumic, 1909–1937, literary historian and critic, and essayist
10. André Maurois, 1938–1967, novelist, essayist, literary historian and critic
11. Marcel Arland, 1968–1986, novelist, essayist, literary historian and critic
12. Georges Duby, 1987–1996, historian
13. Jean-Marie Rouart, elected 1997, novelist and essayist

== Seat 27 ==
1. Abel Servien, 1634–1659, politician
2. Jean-Jacques Renouard de Villayer, 1659–1691, politician
3. Bernard le Bovier de Fontenelle, 1691–1757, playwright and philosopher
4. Antoine-Louis Séguier, 1757–1792, lawyer
5. Jacques-Henri Bernardin de Saint-Pierre, 1803–1814, essayist
6. Étienne Aignan, 1814–1824, journalist and playwright
7. Alexandre Soumet, 1824–1845, poet and playwright
8. Ludovic Vitet, 1845–1873, archaeologist
9. Elme Marie Caro, 1874–1887, philosopher
10. Gabriel Paul Othenin de Cléron, comte d'Haussonville, 1888–1924, politician and lawyer
11. Auguste-Armand de la Force, 1925–1961 historian
12. Joseph Kessel, 1962–1979, journalist and novelist
13. Michel Droit, 1980–2001, novelist
14. Pierre Nora, 2001–2025, historian

== Seat 28 ==
1. Jean-Louis Guez de Balzac, 1634–1654, essayist
2. Paul Hardouin de Péréfixe de Beaumont, 1654–1670, ecclesiastic and historian
3. François de Harlay de Champvallon, 1671–1695, ecclesiastic
4. André Dacier, 1695–1722, philologist and translator
5. Guillaume Dubois, 1722–1723, ecclesiastic and politician
6. Charles-Jean-François Hénault, 1723–1770, magistrate
7. Charles Juste de Beauvau, 1771–1793, politician and soldier
8. Philippe-Antoine Merlin de Douai, 1803–1815, politician and lawyer; removed by ordinance
9. Antoine-François-Claude Ferrand, 1816–1825, magistrate, poet, historian and playwright
10. Casimir Delavigne, 1825–1843, poet and playwright
11. Charles Augustin Sainte-Beuve, 1844–1869, essayist and poet
12. Jules Janin, 1870–1874, novelist and critic
13. John Lemoinne, 1875–1892, diplomat and journalist
14. Ferdinand Brunetière, 1893–1906, literary critic, historian of literature and essayist
15. Henri Barboux, 1907–1910, lawyer
16. Henry Roujon, 1911–1914, senior bureaucrat, essayist and novelist
17. Louis Barthou, 1918–1934, politician, magistrate, historian and historian of literature; assassinated
18. Claude Farrère, 1935–1957, novelist, essayist and historian
19. Henri Troyat, 1959–2007, novelist, historian of literature, historian
20. Jean-Christophe Rufin, elected 2008, physician and novelist

== Seat 29 ==
1. Pierre Bardin, 1634–1635, philosopher and mathematician
2. Nicolas Bourbon, 1637–1644, ecclesiastic
3. François-Henri Salomon de Virelade, 1644–1670, lawyer
4. Philippe Quinault, 1670–1688, poet and playwright
5. François de Callières, 1688–1717, philologist
6. André-Hercule de Fleury, 1717–1743, ecclesiastic and politician
7. Paul d'Albert de Luynes, 1743–1788, ecclesiastic
8. Jean-Pierre Claris de Florian, 1788–1794, playwright, novelist and poet
9. Jean-François Cailhava de L'Estandoux, 1803–1813, playwright, poet and critic
10. Joseph Michaud, 1813–1839, journalist and historian
11. Jean Pierre Flourens, 1840–1867, physiologist
12. Claude Bernard, 1868–1878, doctor
13. Ernest Renan, 1878–1892, philosopher
14. Paul-Armand Challemel-Lacour, 1893–1896, politician and diplomat
15. Gabriel Hanotaux, 1897–1944, politician, diplomat and historian
16. André Siegfried, 1944–1959, historian and geographer
17. Henry de Montherlant, 1960–1972, playwright, novelist and essayist
18. Claude Lévi-Strauss, 1973–2009, anthropologist
19. Amin Maalouf, elected 2011, novelist

== Seat 30 ==
1. Honorat de Bueil, seigneur de Racan, 1634–1670, poet
2. François-Séraphin Régnier-Desmarais, 1670–1713, ecclesiastic and grammarian
3. Bernard de la Monnoye, 1713–1728, philologist and critic
4. Michel Poncet de La Rivière, 1728–1730, ecclesiastic
5. Jacques Hardion. 1730–1766, historian
6. Antoine Léonard Thomas, 1766–1785, poet
7. Jacques Antoine Hippolyte, Comte de Guibert, 1785–1790, playwright
8. Jean Jacques Régis de Cambacérès, 1803- excluded by ordinance 1816, politician; died 1824
9. Louis Gabriel Ambroise de Bonald, 1816–1840, philosopher and publicist
10. Jacques-François Ancelot, 1841–1854, poet, novelist and playwright
11. Ernest Legouvé, 1855–1903, poet, novelist, playwright and essayist
12. René Bazin, 1903–1932, novelist and essayist
13. Théodore Gosselin, 1932–1935, historian who wrote under the pen name of G. Lenotre
14. Georges Duhamel, 1935–1966, doctor, essayist, novelist, poet and playwright
15. Maurice Druon, 1966–2009, politician and novelist
16. Danièle Sallenave, elected 2011, novelist and journalist

== Seat 31 ==
1. Pierre de Boissat, 1634–1662, soldier
2. Antoine Furetière, 1662–1685, poet, fabulist and novelist; excluded but not replaced, died in 1688
3. Jean de La Chapelle, 1688–1723, poet
4. Pierre-Joseph Thoulier d'Olivet, 1723–1768, ecclesiastic and grammarian
5. Étienne Bonnot de Condillac, 1768–1780, ecclesiastic and philosopher
6. Louis-Élisabeth de La Vergne de Tressan, 1780–1783, poet and physicist
7. Jean Sylvain Bailly, 1783–1793, mathematician; guillotined
8. Emmanuel Joseph Sieyès, 1803–1816, ecclesiastic, essayist and diplomat; excluded by ordinance, died 1836
9. Gérard de Lally-Tollendal, 1816–1830, politician
10. Jean-Baptiste Sanson de Pongerville, 1830–1870, poet
11. Xavier Marmier, 1870–1892, novelist and poet
12. Henri de Bornier, 1893–1901, playwright and poet
13. Edmond Rostand, 1901–1918, playwright and poet
14. Joseph Bédier, 1920–1938, philologist
15. Jérôme Tharaud, 1938–1953, novelist
16. Jean Cocteau, 1955–1963, playwright, poet, choreographer, filmmaker and painter
17. Jacques Rueff, 1964–1978, economist and high bureaucrat
18. Jean Dutourd, 1978–2011, novelist
19. Michael Edwards, elected 2013, literary scholar

== Seat 32 ==
1. Claude Favre de Vaugelas, 1634–1650, grammarian
2. Georges de Scudéry, 1650–1667, novelist, playwright and poet
3. Philippe de Courcillon, 1667–1720, soldier, governor and diplomat
4. Armand de Vignerot du Plessis, 1720–1788, soldier, libertine and politician
5. François-Henri d'Harcourt, 1788–1802, soldier
6. Lucien Bonaparte, 1803–1816, politician. Excluded by ordinance.
7. Louis-Simon Auger, 1816–1829, journalist and playwright
8. Charles-Guillaume Étienne, 1829–1845, poet and playwright
9. Alfred de Vigny, 1845–1863, poet
10. Camille Doucet, 1865–1895, poet and playwright
11. Charles Costa de Beauregard, 1896–1909, historian and politician
12. Hippolyte Langlois, 1911–1912, soldier
13. Émile Boutroux, 1912–1921, philosopher and historian of philosophy
14. Pierre de Nolhac, 1922–1936, historian, art historian and poet
15. Georges-François-Xavier-Marie Grente, 1936–1959, ecclesiastic, historian and essayist
16. Henri Massis, 1960–1970, essayist, literary critic and literary historian
17. Georges Izard, 1971–1973, politician, lawyer, journalist and essayist
18. Robert Aron, 1974–1975, historian and essayist
19. Maurice Rheims, 1976–2003, novelist and art historian
20. Alain Robbe-Grillet, 2004–2008, novelist and filmmaker
21. François Weyergans, 2009–2019, novelist and filmmaker
22. Pascal Ory, elected 2021, historian

== Seat 33 ==
1. Vincent Voiture, 1634–1648, poet
2. François Eudes de Mézeray, 1648–1683, lawyer
3. Jean Barbier d'Aucour, 1683–1694, lawyer
4. François de Clermont-Tonnerre, 1694–1701, ecclesiastic
5. Nicolas de Malézieu, 1701–1727, tutor and poet
6. Jean Bouhier, 1727–1746, magistrate and archaeologist
7. François-Marie Arouet dit Voltaire, 1746–1778, playwright, historian, philosopher and poet
8. Jean-François Ducis, 1778–1816, poet and playwright
9. Raymond Desèze, 1816–1828, lawyer
10. Amable Guillaume Prosper Brugière, baron de Barante, 1828–1866, politician
11. Auguste Joseph Alphonse Gratry, 1867–1872, ecclesiastic and philosopher
12. René Taillandier, 1873–1879, politician
13. Maxime Du Camp, 1880–1894, essayist and novelist
14. Paul Bourget, 1894–1935, novelist, poet and playwright
15. Edmond Jaloux, 1936–1949, novelist, literary critic and literary historian
16. Jean-Louis Vaudoyer, 1950–1963, novelist, poet, essayist and art historian
17. Marcel Brion, 1964–1984, novelist, art historian and essayist
18. Michel Mohrt, 1985–2011, editor, essayist, novelist and literary historian
19. Dominique Bona, elected 2013, novelist

== Seat 34 ==
1. Honorat de Porchères Laugier, 1634–1653, poet
2. Paul Pellisson, 1653–1693, historian
3. François de Salignac de La Mothe Fénelon, 1693–1715, ecclesiastic and essayist
4. Claude Gros de Boze, 1715–1753, erudite and numismatist
5. Louis de Bourbon Condé de Clermont, 1753–1771, ecclesiastic
6. Pierre-Laurent Buirette de Belloy, 1771–1775, playwright and actor
7. Emmanuel-Félicité de Durfort de Duras, 1775–1789, politician and soldier
8. Dominique Joseph Garat, 1803–1816, politician, lawyer and philosopher. Excluded by ordinance, he refused readmission in 1829, died in 1833
9. Louis-François de Bausset, 1816–1824, ecclesiastic and politician
10. Hyacinthe-Louis de Quélen, 1824–1839, ecclesiastic
11. Louis-Mathieu Molé, 1840–1855, politician
12. Frédéric Alfred Pierre, comte de Falloux, 1856–1886, politician and historian
13. Octave Gréard, 1886–1904, high bureaucrat, literary historian and literary critic
14. Émile Gebhart, 1904–1908, art historian, literary historian and literary critic
15. Raymond Poincaré, 1909–1934, head of state, politician, lawyer and essayist
16. Jacques Bainville, 1935–1936, historian and journalist
17. Joseph de Pesquidoux, 1936–1946, novelist and essayist
18. Maurice Genevoix, 1946–1980, novelist
19. Jacques de Bourbon-Busset, 1981–2001, politician, essayist and novelist
20. François Cheng, elected 2002, poet, translator and novelist

== Seat 35 ==
1. Henri Louis Habert de Montmor, 1634–1679, hotel-keeper
2. Louis de Lavau, 1679–1694, ecclesiastic
3. François Lefebvre de Caumartin, 1694–1733, ecclesiastic
4. François-Augustin de Paradis de Moncrif, 1733–1770, poet, musician and playwright
5. Jean-Armand de Bessuéjouls Roquelaure, 1771–1818, ecclesiastic
6. Georges Cuvier, 1818–1832, palaeontologist
7. André Marie Jean Jacques Dupin, 1832–1865, politician and lawyer
8. Alfred-Auguste Cuvillier-Fleury, 1866–1887, historian and literary critic
9. Jules Arsène Arnaud Claretie, 1888–1913, novelist, playwright and critic
10. Joseph Joffre, 1918–1931, politician and soldier
11. Maxime Weygand, 1931–1965, soldier
12. Louis Leprince-Ringuet, 1966–2000, physicist, telecommunications engineer, historian of science and essayist
13. Yves Pouliquen, 2001–2020, medical doctor
14. Antoine Compagnon, elected 2022, academic

== Seat 36 ==
1. Marin Cureau de la Chambre, 1634–1669, medical doctor and philosopher
2. Pierre Cureau de La Chambre, 1670–1693, ecclesiastic
3. Jean de La Bruyère, 1693–1696, essayist and moralist
4. Claude Fleury, 1696–1723, ecclesiastic
5. Jacques Adam, 1723–1735, philologist
6. Joseph Séguy, 1736–1761, ecclesiastic
7. Louis René Édouard, cardinal de Rohan, 1761–1793, ecclesiastic, politician, philosopher and poet
8. Jean Devaines, 1803, state bureaucrat
9. Évariste de Parny, 1803–1814, poet
10. Victor-Joseph Étienne de Jouy, 1815–1846, journalist, critic and playwright
11. Adolphe-Simonis Empis, 1847–1868, poet and playwright
12. Henri Auguste Barbier, 1869–1882, poet
13. Adolphe Perraud, 1882–1906, ecclesiastic
14. François-Désiré Mathieu, 1906–1908, ecclesiastic and historian
15. Louis Duchesne, 1910–1922, ecclesiastic, historian and philologist
16. Henri Brémond, 1923–1933, ecclesiastic, literary historian and literary critic
17. André Bellessort, 1935–1942, essayist, literary critic, historian and historian of literature
18. René Grousset, 1946–1952, art historian
19. Pierre Gaxotte, 1953–1982, historian and journalist
20. Jacques Soustelle, 1983–1990, Americanist, ethnologist, politician and essayist
21. Jean-François Deniau, 1990–2007, politician, essayist and novelist
22. Philippe Beaussant, 2007–2016, musicologist and novelist
23. Barbara Cassin, elected 2018, philologist and philosopher

== Seat 37 ==
1. Daniel Hay du Chastelet de Chambon, 1635–1671, ecclesiastic and mathematician
2. Jacques-Bénigne Bossuet, 1671–1704, ecclesiastic and historian
3. Melchior de Polignac, 1704–1741, ecclesiastic, politician, philologist and poet
4. Odet-Joseph Giry, 1741–1761, ecclesiastic
5. Charles Batteux, 1761–1780, ecclesiastic
6. Antoine-Marin Lemierre, 1780–1793, poet and playwright
7. Félix-Julien-Jean Bigot de Préameneu, 1803–1825, politician and lawyer
8. Mathieu de Montmorency, 1825–1826, politician and diplomat
9. Alexandre Guiraud, 1826–1847, playwright, poet and novelist
10. Jean-Jacques Ampère, 1847–1864, historian of literature
11. Lucien-Anatole Prévost-Paradol, 1865–1870, literary critic
12. Camille Rousset, 1871–1892, historian
13. Paul Thureau-Dangin, 1893–1913, historian
14. Pierre de La Gorce, 1914–1934, historian, magistrate and lawyer
15. Maurice, 6th duc de Broglie, 1934–1960, sailor and physicist
16. Eugène Tisserant, 1961–1972, ecclesiastic and philologist
17. Jean Daniélou, 1972–1974, ecclesiastic, theologian, historian and essayist
18. Ambroise-Marie Carré, 1975–2004, ecclesiastic
19. René Girard, 2005–2015, philosopher, literary critic
20. Michel Zink, elected 2017, medievalist, philologist and novelist

== Seat 38 ==
1. Auger de Moléon de Granier, 1635–1636, possibly an ecclesiastic; expelled for theft; died 1650
2. Balthazar Baro, 1636–1650, playwright and poet
3. Jean Doujat, 1650–1688, lawyer
4. Eusèbe Renaudot, 1688–1720, ecclesiastic
5. Henri-Emmanuel de Roquette, 1720–1725, ecclesiastic
6. Pierre de Pardaillan de Gondrin, 1725–1733, ecclesiastic
7. Nicolas-François Dupré de Saint-Maur, 1733–1774, economist and statistician
8. Guillaume-Chrétien de Lamoignon de Malesherbes, 1775–1794, politician and magistrate; guillotined
9. François Andrieux, 1803–1833, lawyer, poet and playwright
10. Adolphe Thiers, 1833–1877, politician and historian
11. Henri Martin, 1878–1883, historian
12. Ferdinand de Lesseps, 1884–1894, diplomat and engineer
13. Anatole France, 1896–1924, novelist and poet
14. Paul Valéry, 1925–1945, poet, literary critic and essayist
15. Henri Mondor, 1946–1962, surgeon, physician, historian of literature and of science
16. Louis Armand, 1963–1971, mining engineer, bureaucrat and economist
17. Jean-Jacques Gautier, 1972–1986, drama critic, novelist, journalist and essayist
18. Jean-Louis Curtis, 1986–1995, novelist and essayist
19. François Jacob, 1996–2013, biologist
20. Marc Lambron, elected 2014, literary critic and writer

== Seat 39 ==
1. Louis Giry, 1636–1665, lawyer
2. Claude Boyer, 1666–1698, ecclesiastic, playwright and poet
3. Charles-Claude Genest, 1698–1719, ecclesiastic
4. Jean-Baptiste Dubos, 1720–1742, ecclesiastic and historian
5. Jean-François Du Bellay du Resnel, 1742–1761, ecclesiastic
6. Bernard-Joseph Saurin, 1761–1781, lawyer and poet
7. Jean-Antoine-Nicolas de Caritat, marquis de Condorcet, 1782–1794, philosopher and mathematician
8. Gabriel Villar, 1803–1826, ecclesiastic
9. Charles-Marie de Féletz, 1826–1850, ecclesiastic
10. Désiré Nisard, 1850–1888, essayist
11. Eugène-Melchior de Vogüé, 1888–1910, essayist, historian, literary critic and diplomat
12. Henri de Régnier, 1911–1936, poet, novelist and essayist
13. Jacques de Lacretelle, 1936–1985, novelist
14. Bertrand Poirot-Delpech, 1986–2006, journalist, essayist and novelist
15. Jean Clair, elected 2008, essayist and art historian

== Seat 40 ==
1. Daniel de Priézac, 1639–1662, law professor
2. Michel Le Clerc, 1662–1691, lawyer
3. Jacques de Tourreil, 1692–1714, translator
4. Jean-Roland Malet, 1714–1736, economist and royal valet de chambre
5. Jean-François Boyer, 1736–1755, ecclesiastic
6. Nicolas Thyrel de Boismont, 1755–1786, ecclesiastic
7. Claude-Carloman de Rulhière, 1787–1791, diplomat, poet and historian
8. Pierre Jean George Cabanis, 1803–1808, medical doctor and physiologist
9. Antoine Destutt de Tracy, 1808–1836, philosopher
10. François Guizot, 1836–1874, politician and historian
11. Jean-Baptiste Dumas, 1875–1884, politician and chemist
12. Joseph Louis François Bertrand, 1884–1900, mathematician, historian of science
13. Marcellin Berthelot, 1900–1907, politician, chemist, essayist, historian of science
14. Francis Charmes, 1908–1916, diplomat and journalist
15. Jules Cambon, 1918–1935, diplomat, lawyer, senior civil servant
16. Marie-Jean-Lucien Lacaze, 1936–1955, admiral
17. Jacques Chastenet, 1956–1978, journalist, historian and diplomat
18. Georges Dumézil, 1978–1986, philologist and historian of civilisations
19. Pierre-Jean Rémy, 1988–2010, diplomat, novelist and essayist
20. Xavier Darcos, elected 2013, politician, scholar and civil servant
