= Paul-Philippe de Chaumont =

Paul-Philippe de Chaumont (1617 – 24 March 1697, in Paris) was a French prelate. He was the second member elected to occupy seat 3 of the Académie française in 1654.

From an old family in Vexin where he was count of Chaumont, he was the son of a conseiller d'État, the author of many theological works as well as the king's librarian. A relation of Pierre Séguier and a relation via his mother of the three Haberts (Philippe Habert, Germain Habert and Henri-Louis), Paul-Philippe succeeded his father as king's librarian, having joined the royal library as king's reader. Although he had not yet written any works himself he was elected a member of the Académie française in 1654. Becoming bishop of Dax in 1671, he resigned this post in 1684 so he would be freer to devote himself to studies, although continuing to preach. Jean Chapelain said of him that "he had nothing lacking in his spirit, and had a great grasp of language and preached boldly and easily."

In 1685, he presided over the session of the Académie which pronounced the exclusion of Antoine Furetière. In 1693, he published a two-volume work entitled Réflexions sur le christianisme enseigné dans l'Église catholique. According to the abbé d'Olivet, this treatise's style "responded no less to its author's quality as a historian than the subject responded to his character as a bishop."
