= Daniel de Priézac =

French writer and jurist

Daniel de Priézac (1590 – May 1662) was a French writer and jurist.

== Life ==
Priézac was born in Limousin. Graduating as doctor of law in Bordeaux in 1614, he was professor of jurisprudence and conseiller d'État. He was elected to the Académie française in 1639 as a founder member.

He wrote the Défence des droits et prérogatives des roys de France, contre Alexandre-Patrice Armacan, théologien (Defence of the rights and prerogatives of the kings of France, against Alexandre-Patrice Armacan, theologian), first published in Latin in 1639, then in French the following year, in which he argued that cardinal Richelieu, by proclaiming the supremacy of royal power and defending France's interests, was only defending the power and interests of the Catholic religion. Besides political discourses he published in 1652-54, Daniel de Priézac left behind his Paraphrases sur les Psaumes (Paraphrases on the Psalms) and a work entitled Les Privilèges de la Vierge Mère de Dieu (The Privileges of the Virgin Mother of God), published in 1648.

Cultural offices
Preceded by Founder	Seat 40; Académie française 1639–1662	Succeeded by Michel Le Clerc
