= Jacques Cassagne =

French clergyman, poet, and moralist

Jacques Cassagne or Jacques de Cassaigne (French pronunciation: [ʒak kasaɲ]; 1 January 1636, Nîmes – 19 May 1679, Paris) was a French clergyman, poet, and moralist.

== Biography ==
A doctor of theology, he was 'garde' of the king's library and entered the Académie française aged 29. In 1663, he was one of the four founder members of the "Petite Académie", which later gave birth to the Académie des inscriptions et belles-lettres. In 1665, he edited the preface to the complete works of Guez de Balzac edited by Conrart. In 1674, he published a Traité de morale sur la valeur (Moral treatise on valour). He translated the Rhetorica (then thought to be by Cicero) and Sallust's Histories from Latin into French - Chapelain stated that Cassagne wrote "[in a] more natural than acquired [style], especially in the field of human letters".

Also a renowned preacher, he was cruelly mocked by Boileau in the latter's third Satire, referring to people squashed in to listen to the "sermons of Cassaigne" and those of Charles Cotin. As a poet, Cassagne took the side of the moderns in the Quarrel of the Ancients and the Moderns. In 1668, he published a poem Sur la conqueste de la Franche-Comté (On the conquest of the Franche-Comté, during the War of Devolution) and in 1672 a Poëme sur la guerre de Hollande (Poem on the war with Holland, referring to the Franco-Dutch War). Boileau commented on these poems:

Chacun a débité ses maximes frivoles, (Everyone has charged its maxims as being frivolous)
Réglé les intérests de chaque Potentat, (It rules on the interests of each potentate,)
Corrigé la Police, & réformé l'Estat; (It corrects the Police, and reforms the State)
Puis de là s'embarquant dans la nouvelle guerre, (Then he embarks on a new war,)
À vaincre la Hollande, ou battre l'Angleterre. (To vanquish Holland, or beat England.)

With failing health, Cassagne died aged only 46, possibly due (some said) to the grief this satire had caused.
