= Nicolas Perrot d'Ablancourt =

French translator

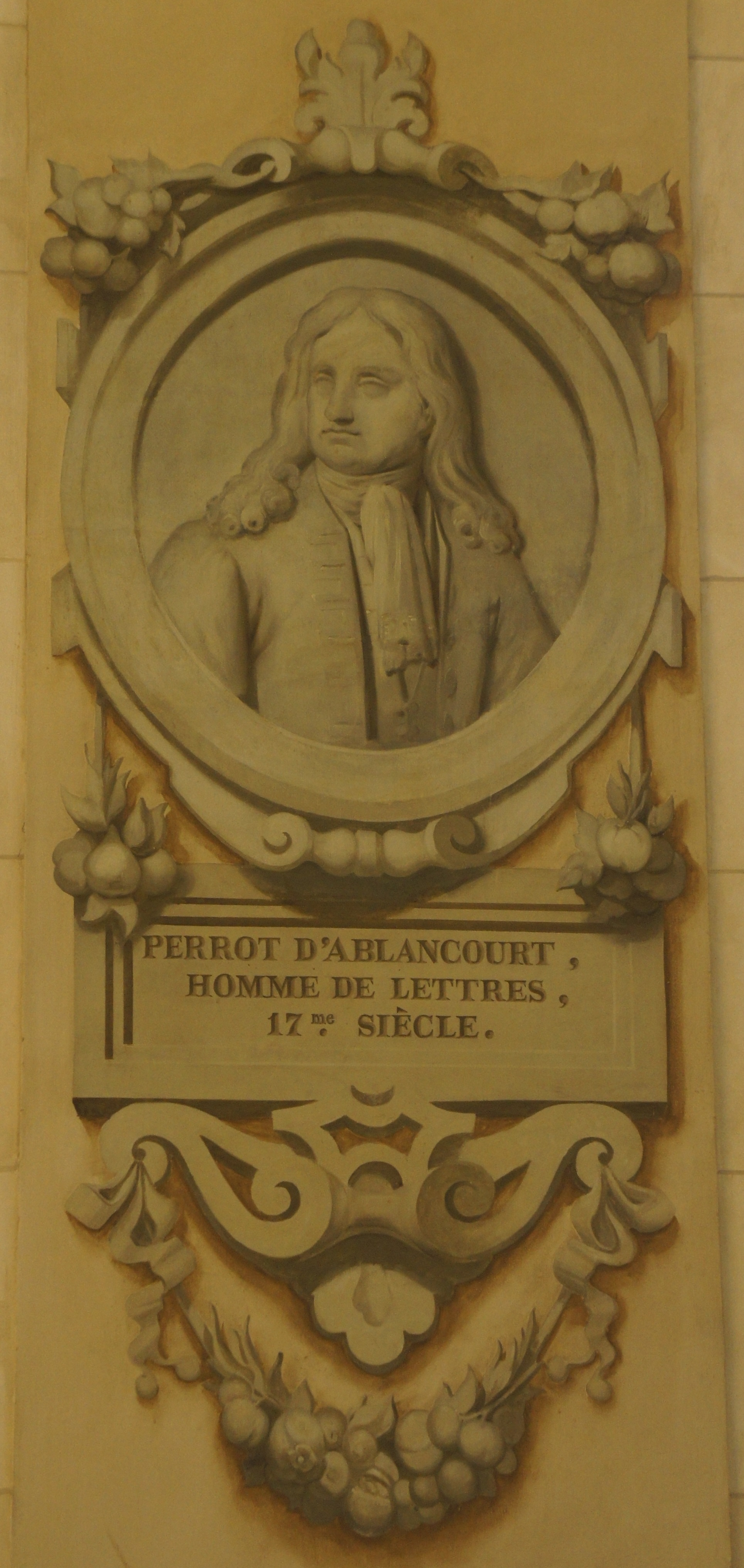
Nicolas Perrot d'Ablancourt

Nicolas Perrot d'Ablancourt (5 April 1606, Châlons-en-Champagne – 17 November 1664, Paris) was a French translator of the Greek and Latin classics into French and a member of the Académie française.

== Biography ==
Nicolas Perrot d'Ablancourt was born into a Protestant family; his father Paul Perrot (de la Salle) converted during his studies at Oxford, and his mother, Anne des Forges, was the daughter of a Protestant. Perrot d’Ablancourt himself renounced his religious beliefs at one stage, but later changed his mind.

After reading law at the Huguenot Academy of Sedan, he later travelled to Leiden in the Netherlands and then to England. Upon returning to France, he established links with contemporary intellectuals, and in 1637 he was elected a member of the Académie française. Between 1637 and 1662, he published numerous translations of classical Greek and Latin texts; including the works of Julius Caesar, Cicero, Frontinus, Homer, Plutarch, Tacitus, Thucydides and Xenophon, as well as other less well known writers, and some contemporary Spanish works, such as the writings of the chronicler Luis del Mármol Carvajal.

== Translation style ==
In the prefaces to his translations, Perrot d’Ablancourt set out his principles of translation. He followed the somewhat contentious practice of Valentin Conrart, one of the founding fathers of the Académie française, of modifying or modernising expressions in the original text for reasons of style. While some authors praised the elegance and subtlety of Perrot d’Ablancourt's translations, a disparaging remark by one of his contemporary critics gave rise to the expression « la belle infidèle ». The French scholar Gilles Ménage is reported to have compared the translation to a woman he had once loved, who was “beautiful, but unfaithful”. This expression was later picked up and popularised by other authors such as Constantijn Huygens and Voltaire. Some of Perrot d’Ablancourt's translations are still being edited, and the debate regarding the necessity of absolute fidelity to the source text when translating continues to this day.
