= Séguier =

Séguier is a French surname. Notable people with the surname include:

- Anne de Seguier (fl. 1583), French poet and salon holder
- Antoine-Louis Séguier (1726–1792), French lawyer and magistrate
- Jean-François Séguier (1703–1784), French astronomer and botanist
- Margaret Seguier (1795–1870), British miniature painter
- Paul Séguier (born 1997), French rugby league footballer
- Pierre Séguier (1588–1672), French statesman and chancellor of France from 1635
- René Séguier (born 1949), French rugby union player
- William Seguier (1772–1843), British art dealer, painter, and functionary in the art world

== See also ==
- Atlantica-Séguier (Created in 1984), French publishing house
