= Émile Gebhart =

French academic and writer

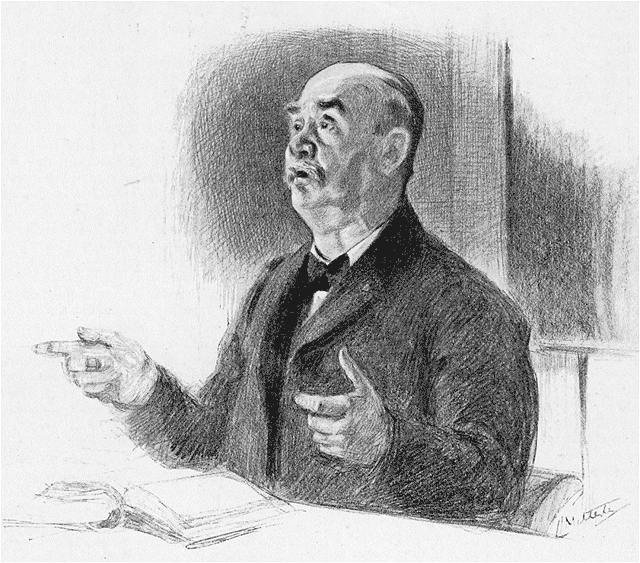

Émile Gebhart (19 July 1839, Nancy, Meurthe-et-Moselle – 22 April 1908, Paris) was a French academic and writer, He was elected to the Académie Française (fauteuil 34) in 1905.

He was attacked by Radicals for his religious and patriotic ideals.

== Life ==
He was the grand-nephew of General Drouot. Having finished his studies in the lycée of Nancy, he was admitted to the École Française of Athens, where he researched future works. When he returned to France he was sent to the lycée of Nice and soon after appointed professor of foreign literature in the University of Nancy.

A chair of Southern European literature was instituted specially for him at the Sorbonne, in 1880. For the twenty-six years during which he retained that position, he was a most popular professor, his lectures being attended by enthusiastic audiences both of students and of men and women of the world. In 1895 he was elected to the Academy of Moral and Political Sciences.

Every summer, for twenty-five years, he spent three months in Italy, visiting Rome, Milan, Florence, Venice, seeking books in libraries, staying in monasteries and talking with the monks, and gathering popular legends.

== Works ==
His favourite subjects were Greek antiquity and the Italian Renaissance. His style is clear, if slightly sarcastic at times. His works include:

- "Praxitele" (1864),
- "La Renaissance et la Réforme" (1877),
- "Les Origines de la Renaissance en Italie" (1879),
- "L' Italie mystique" (1890), translated as "Mystics and Heretics in Italy" (1922),
- "Le son des Cloches, contes et légendes" (1898),
- "Moines et Papes" (1896),
- "Autour d' une tiare" (1894),
- "Cloches de Noël et de Pâques" (1900),
- "Conteurs florentins au moyen-âge" (1901),
- "Jules II" (1904),
- "Florence" (1906),
- "Souvenirs d'un vieil Athénien" (1911).

Cultural offices
Preceded by Octave Gréard	Seat 34; Académie Française; 1904–1908	Succeeded by Raymond Poincaré
