= Jean-Louis Bergeret =

Jean-Louis Bergeret (11 December 1641, Paris – 9 October 1694) was an early holder of the 8th seat of the Académie française.

Bergeret was Advocate General to the Metz Parliament in 1672, and became the first deputy of Charles Colbert, marquis de Croissy, the Secretary of State and younger brother of Jean Baptiste Colbert, and then the King's Cabinet Secretary.

When Bergeret was presented for election to the Academy, he had the support of all of the Colbert family, against Gilles Ménage, by then an octogenarian, who though much more senior had previously displeased the Academy with his Requête des Dictionnaires ("Requirements for Dictionaries").

Bergeret was elected on 4 December 1684 to replace Géraud de Cordemoy, who had killed himself in October of that year, and was received on 2 January 1685 by Jean Racine, the same day as Thomas Corneille.

Little is known of him beyond his election and acceptance speech, and that he received into the Academy François-Timoléon de Choisy and François Fénelon. The Abbé d'Olivet remarked "Nobody knows how he got through the doors of the Academy". He left no writing nor, it seems, anything memorable to his contemporaries.
