= Michael Edwards (literary scholar) =

Anglo-French poet and academic (born 1938)

Sir Michael Edwards OBE
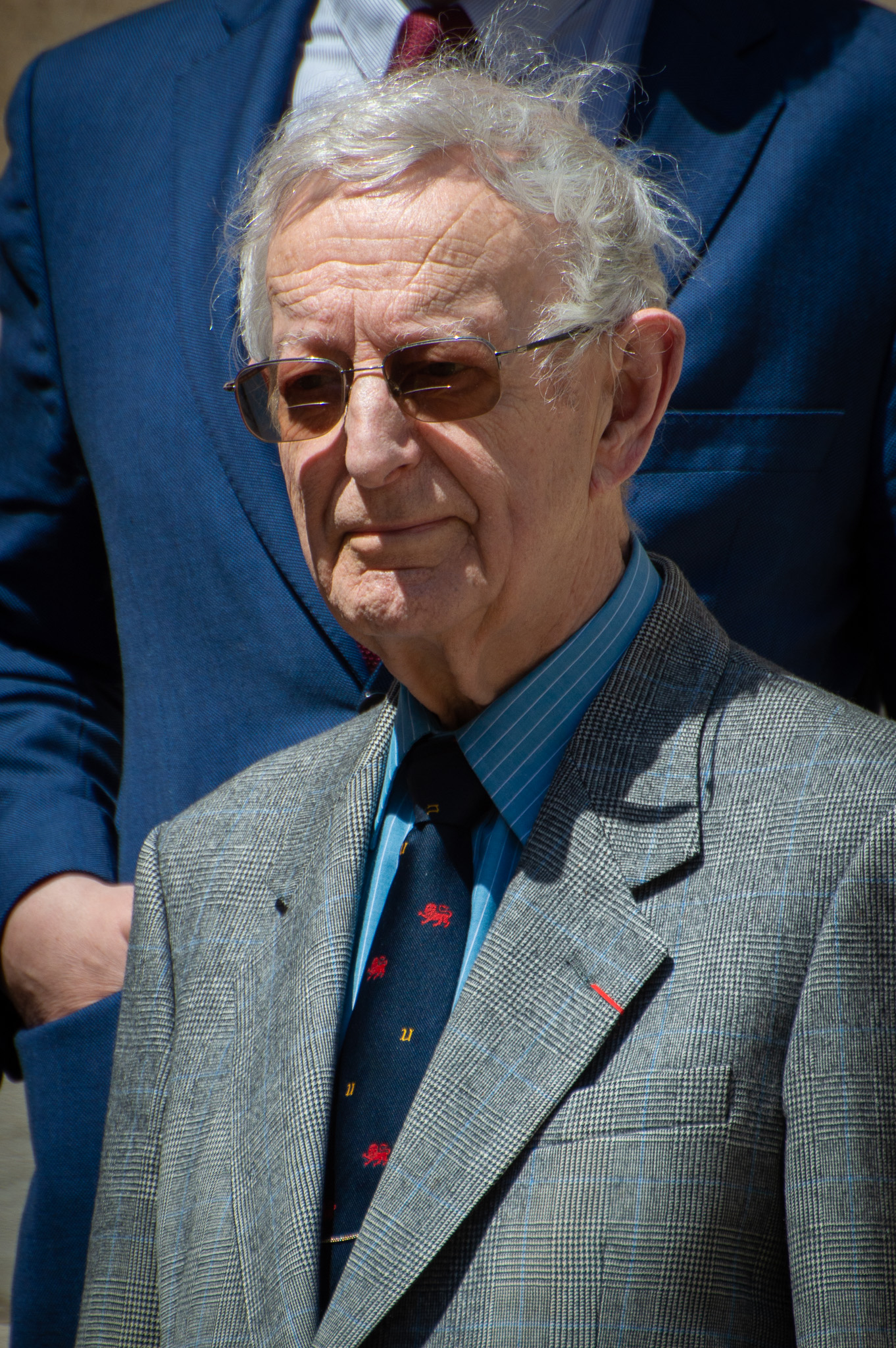
- Born: 29 April 1938 (age 88); London, United Kingdom
- Education: Kingston Grammar School; Christ's College, Cambridge
- Occupations: Poet; Academic
- Known for: Member, Académie Française

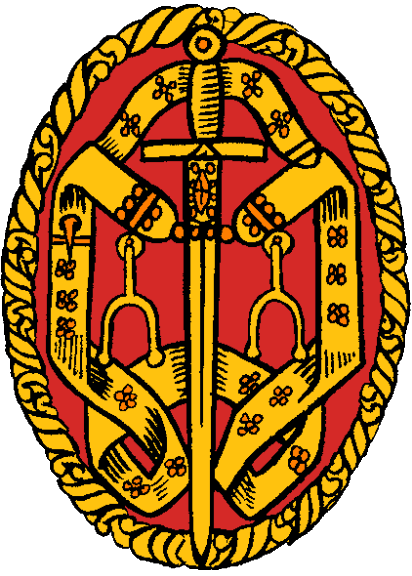
Insignia of a Knight Bachelor

Sir Michael Edwards, OBE (born 29 April 1938) is an Anglo-French poet and academic.

== Life ==
Born in Barnes, SW London, Edwards was educated at Kingston Grammar School and Christ's College, Cambridge, where he read French and Spanish. He wrote his doctoral thesis on Jean Racine, completing it in Paris. He was the longtime professor of English and Comparative Literature at the University of Warwick until 2002, when he was elected to a professorial chair for the Study of Literary Creation in the English Language at the Collège de France.

Edwards was elected to one of the 40 seats in the Académie Française on 21 February 2013, becoming the first English person to be so honoured. He had been nominated previously in 2008, when he received the second highest number of votes in the fourth and final round of voting (eight votes, behind Michel Schneider who received 10) but since no candidate secured a majority the seat then remained vacant.

== Honours ==
Knighted in the 2014 New Year Honours for "services to British–French cultural relations", Sir Michael has received the following honours:

- Chevalier de la Légion d'honneur
- Commandeur de l'ordre des Arts et des Lettres
- OBE
- Knight Bachelor

== Bibliography ==
- La tragédie racinienne, La pensée universelle, 1972
- To Kindle the Starling, Aquila, 1972
- Eliot/Language, Aquila, 1975
- Where, Breakish, Aquila, 1975
- The Ballad of Mobb Conroy, Portree, Aquila, 1977
- Towards a Christian Poetics, London: Macmillan, 1984
- The Magic, Unquiet Body, Portree, Aquila, 1985
- Poetry and Possibility, London: Macmillan, 1988
- Of Making Many Books, London, Macmillan, 1990
- Raymond Mason, London and New York: Thames & Hudson; Paris: Cercle d'Art, 1994
- Éloge de l'attente, Belin, 1996
- De Poetica Christiana, Hermeuneutikai Kutatokozpont, Budapest, 1997
- Beckett ou le don des langues, Espaces 34, 1998
- Leçons de poésie, PUF, 2001
- Avec Yves Bonnefoy, de la poésie (article), Presses Universitaires de Vincennes, 2001
- Sur un vers d'Hamlet, Inaugural Speech at European Chair, Paris, Collège de France, 2001
- Ombres de lune : réflexions sur la création littéraire, Espaces 34, 2001
- Un monde même et autre, Desclée de Brouwer, January 2002
- Rivage mobile, Arfuyen, 2003
- Terre de poésie, Espaces 34, 2003
- Shakespeare et la comédie de l'émerveillement, Desclée de Brouwer, 2003
- Étude de la création littéraire en langue anglaise, "Inaugural Speeches at Collège de France", Paris: Collège de France/Fayard, 2004
- Racine et Shakespeare, PUF, 2004
- Shakespeare et l'œuvre de la tragédie, Belin, 2005
- Le Génie de la poésie anglaise, Paris: Le Livre de poche, 2006
- Co-editor, co-translator, Edgar Allan Poe, Histoires, Essais, Poèmes, Paris: Le Livre de Poche, "La Pochothèque", 2006
- De l'émerveillement, Fayard, 2008
- À la racine du feu/At the Root of Fire, selection of poems, bilingual edition, Caractères, coll. Planètes, 2009
- Shakespeare : Le poète au théâtre, Fayard, 2009
- L'Étrangèreté, audioCD, Paris: Gallimard, "à voix haute", 2010
- Trilogie (piécette). Théâtre et poésie, Paris: TNP/Cheyne Éditeur, 2010
- Le bonheur d'être ici, Fayard, February 2011
- Le rire de Molière, De Fallois, October 2012
- Paris aubaine, Éditions de Corlevour, November 2012
- Reception Speech at Académie française, Paris: De Fallois, 2015
- Bible et poésie, Paris, De Fallois, 2016; 2nd edition, Paris: PUF, 2023
- L'Infiniment proche, Clichy: Éditions de Corlevour, 2016
- Dialogues singuliers sur la langue française, Paris: Presses Universitaires de France, 2016
- Molière et Shakespeare, Paris: Anne Rideau Editions, 2016
- At the Brasserie Lipp, Manchester: Carcanet Press, 2019
- Pour un christianisme intempestif, Paris: De Fallois, 2020
