= Jean-Baptiste-Henri de Valincour =

Jean-Baptiste Henri de Trousset, lord of Valincour or Valincourt (1 March 1653, Paris – 4 January 1730) was a French admiral and man of letters. He was a friend of chancellor d'Aguesseau, Racine (who he replaced at Académie française and as official historiographer to Louis XIV) and Boileau (Valincour was the dedicatee of Boileau's eleventh satire, "On true and false honour", and also completed the publication of Boileau's works in 1713).

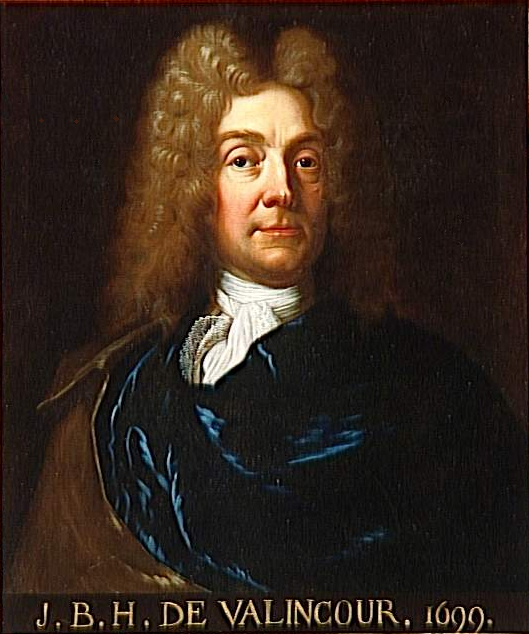
Portrait of Jean-Baptiste-Henri du Trousset de Valincourt

== Biography ==
As a protégé of Jacques-Bénigne Bossuet, he entered the court of Louis-Alexandre de Bourbon, comte de Toulouse and became secretary of the fleet then secretary to the prince's commands. He was also made an honorary member of the Académie des sciences in 1721.

== Works ==
- Lettres à la marquise de *** sur "La princesse de Clèves" , Paris, 1678, in-12 (repub. 1926)
- Vie de François de Lorraine, duc de Guise, Paris, 1681, in-12
- Preface to the Dictionnaire de l'Académie, 1718
- Essai d'une traduction d'Horace, Amsterdam, 1727, in-12
- Verse translation of several odes of Horace in the Menagiana, II
- Observations critiques sur l'Œdipe de Sophocle

== Bibliography ==
- Cardinal Georges Grente (ed.), Dictionnaire des lettres françaises. Le XVIIIe siècle, new edition edited by François Moureau, Paris, Fayard, 1995, p. 1312
- A. Monglond, "Dernières années d'un ami de Racine, Valincour et ses lettres au président Bouhier (1725-1730)", Revue d'histoire littéraire de la France, 1924, pp. 365–403 et 1925, pp. 260–261
- Oscar de Vallée, "Valincour et Racine", Le Moniteur universel, 1859
- "Jean-Baptiste-Henri de Valincour", in Gustave Vapereau, Dictionnaire universel des littératures, Paris, Hachette, 1876, 2 volumes
- C.-G. Williams, "Valincour", in Dissertation Abstracts, 32, Ann Arbor, 1971–72
