= Pierre Bardin =

French mathematician and philosopher (1590–1635)

- Born: 1590; Rouen, France
- Died: 1635 (aged 44–45)
- Citizenship: French
- Occupations: Philosopher and Mathematician and Doctor of Letters

Pierre Bardin (1590 – 29 May 1635), born in Rouen, was a French philosopher and mathematician and Doctor of Letters. He was one of the first members of the Académie française and the first occupant of Seat 29.
