= Jean de Montigny =

French philosopher and poet (1636–1671)

The Abbé Jean de Montigny (French pronunciation: [ʒɑ̃ də mɔ̃tiɲi]; 1636 – 28 September 1671) was a French philosophic writer and poet, elected to the Académie française, but who died in his prime.

== Biography ==
Born in Brittany, Montigny was encouraged by the marquise de Guiche, a granddaughter of Pierre Séguier, chancellor of France.

Montigny delivered the funeral oration for Anne of Austria and was confessor to Louis XIV's Queen Marie-Thérèse. He published some poetry (Le palais des plaisirs) and a Letter to Erastus in which he took up the defense of the unfortunate epic La Pucelle of Jean Chapelain.

In January, 1670 Montigny was named to the Académie française, reading for his reception "Reflections upon languages", a piece that the abbé d'Olivet pronounced the best that the Académie had yet heard. He was appointed bishop of Laon—a post that would have made him a duke and peer of France—but en route to take up his episcopal duties he died of a stroke. At the time of his unexpected death, Mme de Sevigné wrote that he was a luminary of philosophy and attributed the stroke of which he died to overwork.

The Abbé d'Olivet assessed his place in the contemporary literary world: "His prose is correct, elegant, sonorous ("nombreuse"): his versification flowing, noble, filled with images. A few more years, and what might he not have achieved? But, for a man of letters, to die at thirty-five is to die in the cradle."
