= Michel Le Clerc =

French lawyer and dramatist

Michel Le Clerc (1622, Albi – 8 December 1691) was a French lawyer and dramatist.

== Biography ==
After studying under the Jesuits, he established himself in Paris, where he became a lawyer to the parliament of Paris. Like his co-student Claude Boyer, he wrote tragedies and "pièces des circonstance"; he produced his Virginie romaine in 1645, the same year as Boyer produced his Porcie romaine. He was elected to the Académie française in 1662. His Iphigénie (written with Jacques de Coras) was put on in 1674, the same year as the Iphigénie by Jean Racine.

Le Clerc is best known for his translation of Jerusalem Delivered by Torquato Tasso, but his work was attacked by Nicolas Boileau and suffered from a generally unfavourable reputation. Jean Chapelain wrote of him "He wrote reasonably in French prose and not without wit. In prose, he is well above the mediocre, whether in original creation, or in translation".

== Works ==
- La Virginie romaine, tragédie (1645)
- La Hiérusalem délivrée, poëme héroïque traduit en vers français (1667)
- Iphigénie en Aulide, tragédie (1674)
- Orontée, tragédie en musique ornée d'entrées de ballet, de machines et de changemens de théâtre représentée dans le chasteau de Chantilly devant Monseigneur le Dauphin par l'Académie royale de musique (1688)
