= Étienne Lauréault de Foncemagne =

French churchman and scholar

Étienne Lauréault de Foncemagne (8 May 1694, Orléans – 26 September 1779, Paris) was a French churchman and scholar.

== Biography ==
An Oratorian and professor, he was elected to the Académie des inscriptions et belles-lettres in 1722 and to the Académie française in 1736. "Choosing him did not much enrich us, but at least it didn't make the public groan" commented the abbé d'Olivet, who called him "A man little-charged with literature, but he passes for knowing quite a bit about French history.".
