= Hippolyte-Jules Pilet de La Mesnardière =

French physician, man of letters and dramatist (1610–1663)

Hippolyte-Jules Pilet de La Mesnardière (1610, Le Loroux-Bottereau – 4 June 1663, Paris) was a French physician, man of letters and dramatist. He was born in the Province of Brittany.

He was elected to the Académie Française in 1655. He was a major figure in the next few years in the codification of the classical French drama, along with Jean Chapelain and François Hedelin d'Aubignac.

== Bibliography ==
- Traité de la mélancolie, sçavoir si elle est la cause des effets que l’on remarque dans les possédées de Loudun, tiré des Réflexions de M. [de La Mesnardière] sur le Discours de M. D. [Duncan] (1635)
- Raisonnemens de Mesnardière sur la nature des esprits qui servent aux sentimens (1638)
- La Poétique (1639)
- Le Caractère élégiaque (1640)
- Alinde, tragédie (1643)
- Lettre du sr Du Rivage contenant quelques observations sur le poème épique et sur le poème de la Pucelle (1656)
- Les Poésies de Jules de La Mesnardière (1656)
- La Sérénissime reyne de Suède Christine venant en France, sonnet au Roy (1656)
- Chant nuptial pour le mariage du Roy (1660)
- Relations de guerre, contenant : le secours d’Arras, en l’année 1654, le siège de Valence, en l’année 1656, et le siège de Dunkercke, en l’année 1658 (1662)
- Pour le mariage de Mgr le comte et de Mlle Mancini, sonnet à son Altesse Sérénissime (s. d.)

Translation:

- Pliny the Younger Panégyrique de Trajan (1638)
