= Toussaint Rose =

French court secretary

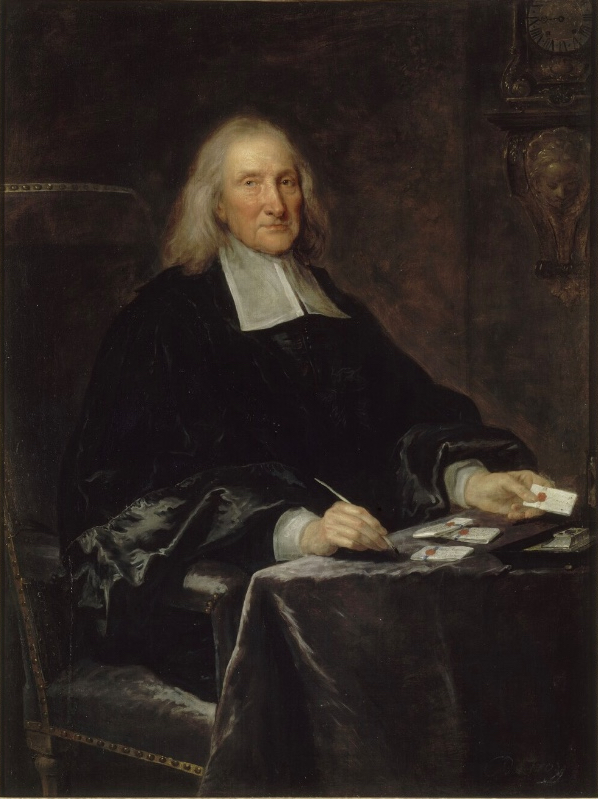
Toussaint Rose

Toussaint Rose (French pronunciation: [tusɛ̃ ʁoz]; born 3 September 1611 in Provins, died 6 January 1701 in Paris) was a French court secretary to Cardinal Mazarin and Louis XIV. He was elected the second member to occupy seat 2 of the Académie française in 1675.
