= Joseph Séguy =

Joseph Séguy (1689 in Rodez – 25 March 1761) was a French clergyman.

A royal preacher, he wrote Panégyriques de saints, Sermons pour les principaux jours du carême, and a Nouvel essai de poésies sacrées, in which he made a French verse translation of Psalms and the songs of the Bible. He was elected to the Académie française in 1736.
