= Philippe Habert =

French poet

Philippe Habert (1604 – 26 July 1637) was a French poet.

Habert was born in Paris and was the brother to Germain Habert and cousin of Henri Louis Habert de Montmor, as well as a friend of Valentin Conrart. Philippe was also one of the first members of the Académie française, and contributed to editing its statutes. An artillery captain, he was killed aged 25 at Aimeries in Belgium, when a wall fell on him as a result of the explosion of a munitions depot in Hainaut.

== See also ==
- Guirlande de Julie
