= François-Nicolas-Vincent Campenon =

French poet and translator

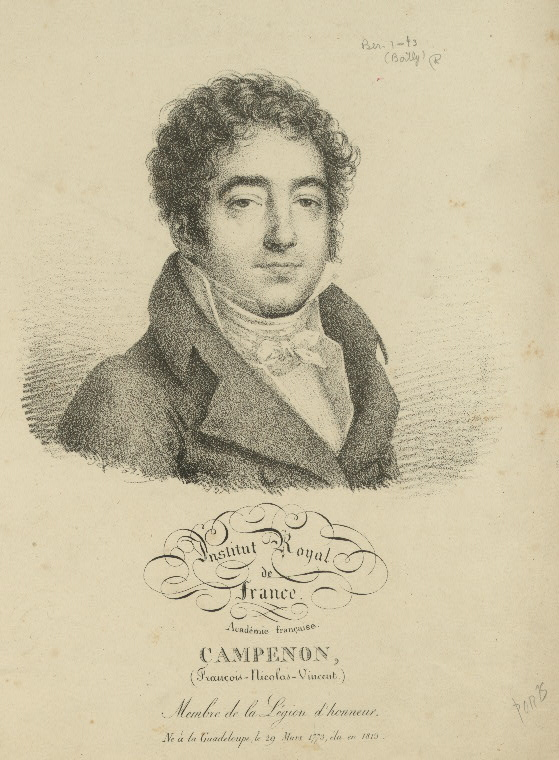
- Lithographie de Campenon par Boilly v. 1813.
- Born: François-Nicolas-Vincent Campenon; 29 March 1772; Basse-Terre (Kingdom of France)
- Died: 29 November 1843, 24 November 1843; Villecresnes (Kingdom of France)
- Occupation: Writer

François Nicolas Vincent Campenon (29 March 1772, Saint-François, Guadeloupe – 29 November 1843, Villecresnes) was a French poet and translator from Latin and English.

== Works ==
=== Poems ===
- Épître aux femmes (1800)
- La Maison des champs, poëme (1810)
- L'Enfant prodigue, poëme en IV chants (1811)
- Poèmes et opuscules en vers et en prose (2 volumes, 1823)
- Œuvres poétiques (1844)

=== Translations ===
- Œuvres d'Horace, traduites par MM. Campenon et Després, accompagnées du Commentaire de l'abbé Galiani, précédées d'un essai sur la vie et les écrits d'Horace et de recherches sur sa maison de campagne (1821)
- Histoire d'Écosse depuis la naissance de Marie Stuart jusqu'à l'avènement de Jacques VI au trône d'Angleterre par W. Robertson (3 volumes, 1821)
- Chefs-d'œuvre des théâtres étrangers traduits en français (1822–23)
- Histoire d'Angleterre depuis l'invasion de Jules César jusqu'à la révolution de 1688 par David Hume, et depuis 1688 jusqu'à 1760, par Smollett, continuée jusqu'en 1783, par Adolphus, et terminée par un Précis des évènements qui se sont passés sous le règne de George III, jusqu'en 1820, par Aikin et quelques historiens anglois, traduite de l'anglais, précédée d'un Essai sur la vie et les écrits de David Hume par M. Campenon (19 volumes, 1825–27). Online text

=== Other ===
- Voyage à Chambéry (1796). Republished : 2003. Online text
- Essais de mémoires ou Lettres sur la vie, le caractère et les écrits de J.-F. Ducis (1824)
