= Éditions Belin =

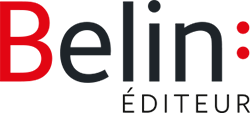
- Founded: 1777; 249 years ago
- Founders: François Belin (1748-1808)
- Headquarters: Paris, France
- Parent: SCOR SE

Éditions Belin, or Belin éditeur, is a French publishing house. It was founded in 1777 and specializes in university, school and extracurricular works.

Until 2014, Belin was the oldest still-independent French publishing house. On October 30, 2014, reinsurer SCOR SE, managed by Denis Kessler, acquired 100% of Belin's capital, end the family's ownership. A merger with Presses Universitaires de France led to the creation of Humensis in December 2016.

== History ==
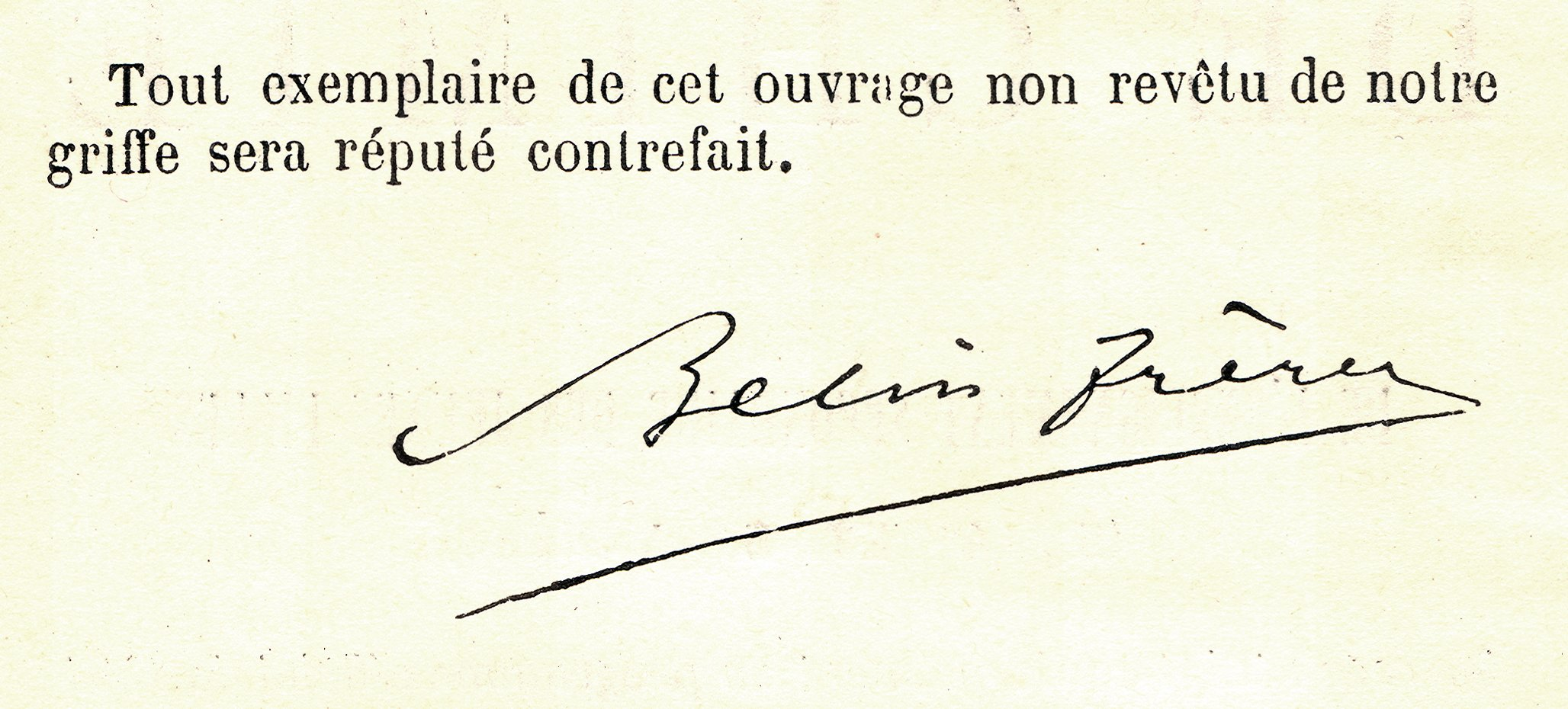
Signature authenticating a book from the Belin Library in 1906.

François Belin-Jacques (1748–1808) founded the house under the name of Librairie Belin on March 10, 1777. in Paris. He was a printer-bookseller from Haute-Marne.

Its catalog is eclectic. In 1785, the University of Paris chose its titles to reward students. During the revolutionary period, François published the French Constitution decreed by the National Constituent Assembly and accepted by the King (1792). He was arrested in April 1794 for a subversive act, but was released shortly after the arrest of Robespierre. In tribute, he named his newborn "Thermidor", said Théophile, who later became a printer in Sézanne. When François died, the catalog already had 1,219 titles.

His two other sons, Léonard (known as Belin-Leprieur, 1781–1855) and Auguste (known as Belin-Mandar, 1786–1851), were also printers. Auguste bought the Librairie Classique Elementaire de Lamennais in 1826, a publishing house that published civic and religious instruction manuals. Belin's vocation for educational books began then. In 1832, Auguste Belin-Mandar printed William Duckett's Dictionary of Conversation and Reading, with success. This double function of printer-publisher only ended in 1954.

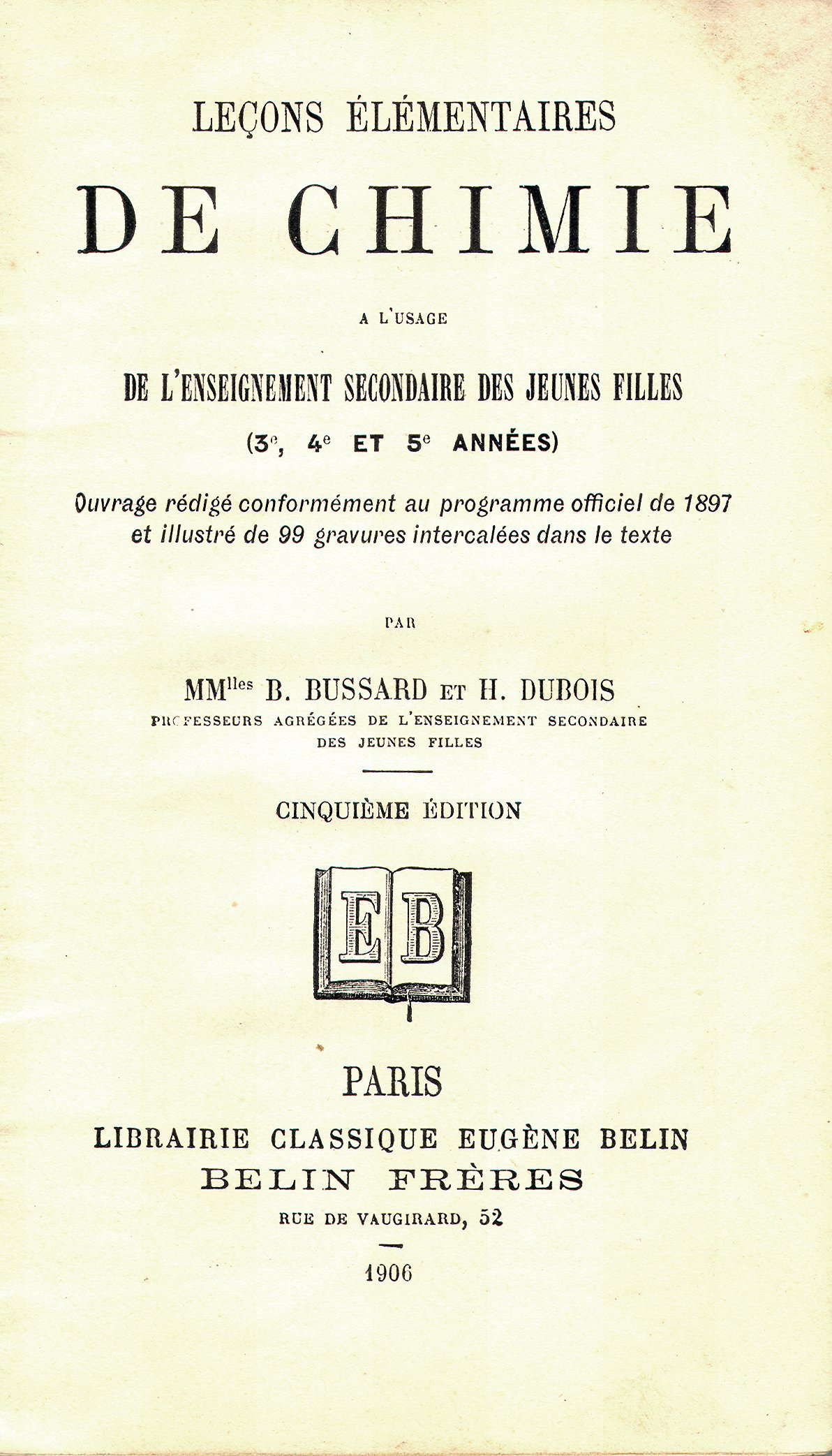
Book from the Belin Library in 1906.

School books were printed by the Crété printing press in Corbeil-Essonnes, by Georges Lang in Paris. In 1974, the Imagine You're English collection was launched. Since 1977, Pour la science has been a subsidiary of Belin, which offered the eponymous magazine and other titles, and which diversified into scientific works. Belin was interested in poetry, publishing the magazine Po&sie, in beautiful books, with the acquisition of the Herscher house in 1987, and in botany with the republication of La Grande Flore, by Gaston Bonnier. The non-school part represented a third of the house's turnover in the 2000s.

Grandson of Paul Belin, son of Jacques Brossollet and Solange Belin, Max Brossollet was Managing Director from 1960, then Chairman from 1969 to 1994. Marie Claude Brossollet (1942-2019), his sister, succeeded him and managed the company until 2008. Sylvie Marcé, who does not belong to the family, then became president.

On January 1, 2017, an editorial group was set up with Presses Universitaires de France, which has the same shareholder, SCOR SE. The newly combined entity was named Humensis, and included the editions of the Observatory.

It is the 12th-largest French group with 30 million euros in turnover and 180 employees. The editions of the Observatory joined the venture.

As of March 6, 2017, the company relocated from its historic premises on rue Férou to settle at 170 bis, boulevard du Montparnasse.
