= Henri Louis Habert de Montmor =

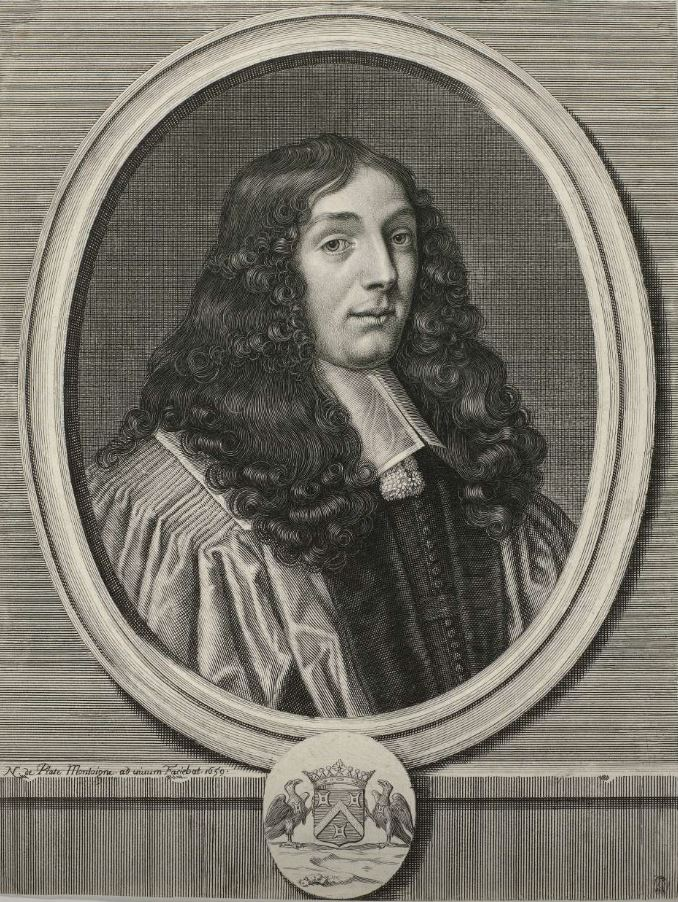
Portrait of Henri Louis Habert de Montmor by Nicolas de Plattemontagne, 1659

Henri Louis Habert de Montmort (c. 1600, Paris – 21 January 1679, Paris) was a French scholar and man of letters.

== Biography ==
Cousin to Philippe Habert and Germain Habert, he became conseiller du roi aged 25, then in 1632 rose to become maître des requêtes, a post he gained thanks to the fortune of his father, treasurer extraordinary for war and treasurer of savings.

He married Henriette-Marie de Buade, sister of Louis de Buade de Frontenac, future governor of New France. He attended on Marie de Gournay and wrote Latin epigrams. In 1634, he was elected an inaugural member of the Académie française, pronouncing its fifth discourse but soon becoming a dissenting member as well as its last inaugural member to die.

A supporter of Descartes, Habert wrote a poem on Cartesian physics entitled De rerum naturae and collected scientific instruments. He was a friend of Mersenne, who dedicated his Harmonie Universelle to Montmor, and a great friend of Pierre Gassendi, who dedicated to him his Life of Tycho Brahe. Gassendi also left him an astronomical telescope he had been left by Galileo. Three years after Gassendi's death, Habert edited his complete works in 6 volumes, writing its Latin preface.

Besides Gassendi, he gathered a salon of savants and philosophers which included, among others: Pierre Daniel Huet, Jean Chapelain, Adrien Auzout, Girard Desargues, Samuel Sorbière, Claude Clerselier, Jacques Rohault, Guy Patin, Frénicle de Bessy, Pierre Petit, Melchisédech Thévenot, Roberval and Huygens.

They were all passionate about scientific experiments and formed in 1657 the "Académie Montmort", which was based in his house. It ceased to exist in 1664 as a result of petty squabbles, but one of the members, Adrien Auzout, indicated in a letter of dedication to Louis XIV in 1664 that there was a need for a public observatory, and that there was a group ready to begin its work if it received royal sponsorship. A proposed constitution was circulated to former Academy members but numerous modifications were made before the Académie des sciences was finally created in 1666.

== See also ==
- Guirlande de Julie
