= Danièle Sallenave =

French novelist and journalist

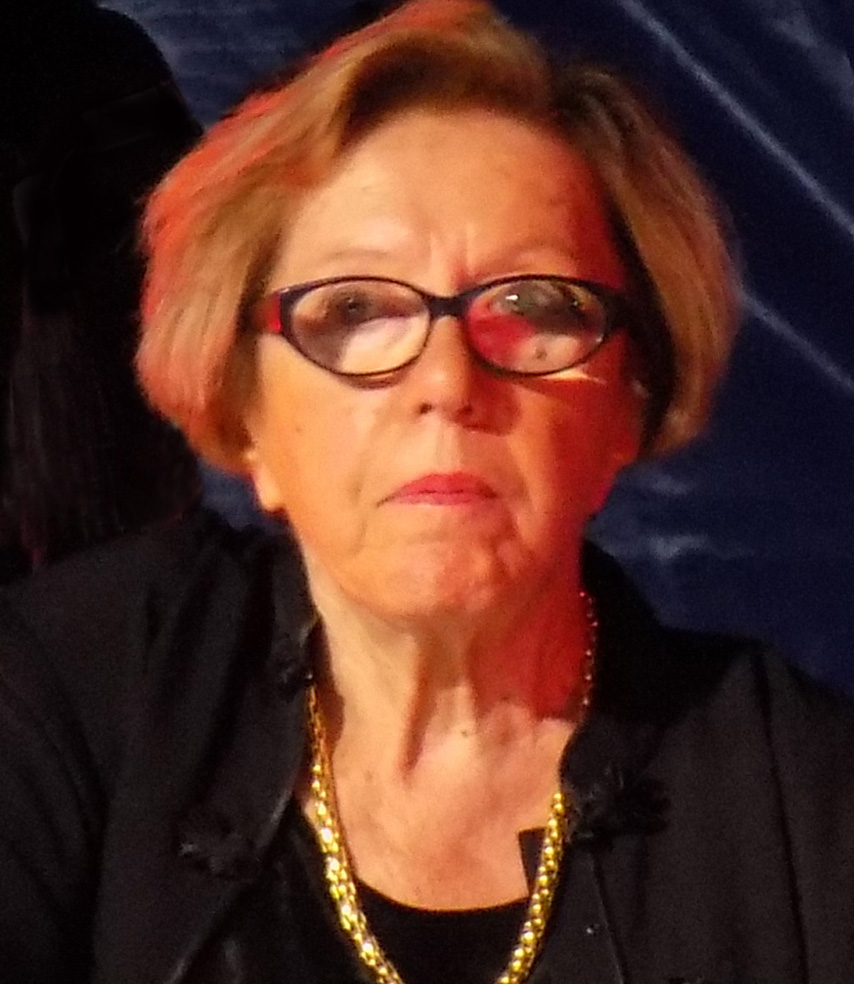
- Danièle Sallenave in 2019.
- Born: 28 October 1940 (age 85); Angers, France
- Education: École normale supérieure de jeunes filles
- Occupation: Writer
- Known for: Member of the Académie française

Danièle Sallenave (French pronunciation: [danjɛl salnav]; born 28 October 1940) is a French novelist and journalist. In April 2011, she became a member of the Académie française. In 1980 Sallenave received the Prix Renaudot for her novel Les Portes de Gubbio.

== Works ==
- Un printemps froid: récits, P.O.L., 1983, ISBN 978-2-86744-009-0
- Phantom life, Pantheon Books, 1989, ISBN 978-0-394-56453-1
- À quoi sert la littérature ?, Editions Textuel, 1997, ISBN 9782909317359
- L'Amazone du grand Dieu, Bayard, 1997, ISBN 978-2-227-43806-4
- Castor de guerre, Gallimard, 2008, ISBN 978-2-07-078146-1

== Critical works ==
- Jacques Le Martinel (ed.), Danièle Sallenave: Visages d'une oeuvre, Angers University Press, 2000.
- Bruno Thibault, Danièle Sallenave et le don des morts, Amsterdam/New York, Editions Rodopi, 2004.
- Bruno Thibault (ed.), Danièle Sallenave, Europe, January 2014 (in press)
