= Ange-François Fariau =

French poet and translator

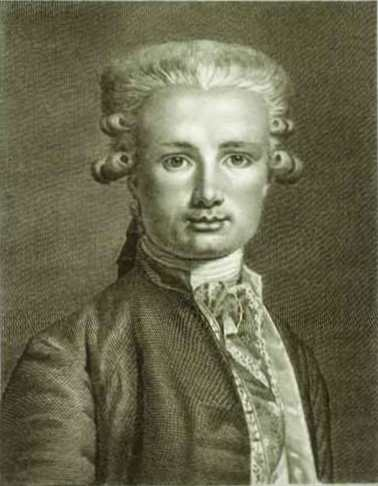
Ange-François Fariau. (Musée de la Révolution française)

Ange-François Fariau (French pronunciation: [ɑ̃ʒ fʁɑ̃swa faʁjo]; 13 October 1747 – 8 December 1810) was a French poet and translator.

Fariau was born in Blois, the son of an advisor to the king. He studied in the Jesuit college of Blois, and later at the Sainte-Barbe college in Paris. A protégé of Turgot, he went on to be a teacher in the Parisian school of rue Saint-Antoine, teaching grammar and later belles-lettres. He became well known for his translations of Ovid's works, especially Metamorphoses. Fariau also penned his own odes and poems. In 1810 he was elected to l'Académie française, but died in Paris three months later after a fall.
