= Marc Lambron =

French writer

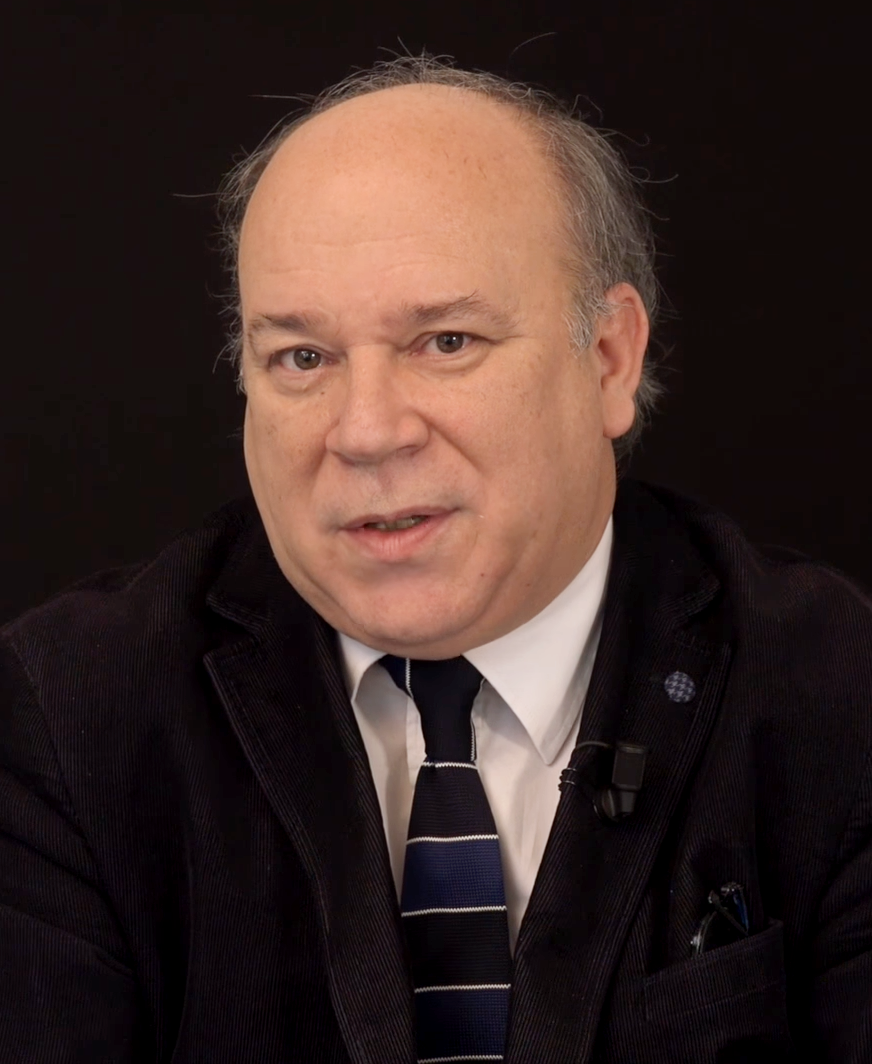
- Marc Lambron in 2017
- Born: 4 February 1957 (age 69); Lyon, France
- Occupation: Novelist
- Writing career
- Language: French
- Notable work: L'Oeil du silence
- Notable awards: Prix Femina

Marc Lambron (French pronunciation: [maʁk lɑ̃bʁɔ̃]; born 4 February 1957 in Lyon) is a French writer and winner of the Prix Femina, 1993, for L'Oeil du silence.

== Bibliography ==
- Les Menteurs
- L'Impromptu de Madrid, (Flammarion, 1989)
- L'Œil du silence (1993)
- 1941
- Étrangers dans la nuit
- Carnet de bal I et II
- La Nuit des masques
- Une saison sur la terre, (Éditions Grasset, 2006)
- Mignonne, allons voir..., (2007)
- Eh bien, dansez maintenant!, (2008)
- La princesse et le pangolin, (2020)

== Honours and awards ==
- Prix des Deux Magots for L'Impromptu de Madrid in 1989
- Prix Femina for L'Œil du silence in 1993
- Prix Colette for La Nuit des masques
- 2014 Académie française Seat 38
