= Germain Habert =

French writer and abbot (1615–1654)

Germain Habert de Cérisy (1610 – May 1654) was a French churchman and poet. He was abbot of Saint-Vigor.

Germain Habert was born in Paris. He was the cousin of Henri Louis Habert de Montmor, brother of Philippe Habert and like Philippe a friend of Conrart (king's almoner and commendatory abbot of Cerisy) he was elected a member of the Académie française from its foundation in 1634.

He was the author of a Life of cardinal Bérulle (1654), paraphrases of the Psalms (1663 & 1665) and poems, including Phyllidis oculi in astra metamorphosis or the Métamorphose des yeux de Philis en astres (Metamorphosis of Phyllis's eyes into stars, 1677). He died in Paris.

Voltaire said in his Siècle de Louis XIV that Germain:

was of the time of the dawn of good taste and of the establishment of the Académie française. His Métamorphose des yeux de Philis en astres, a poem, 1639, was vaunted as a masterwork, and ceased to appear as soon as good authors arrived. (Catalogue de la plupart des écrivains français qui ont paru dans le Siècle de Louis XIV, pour servir à l’histoire littéraire de ce temps, 1751).

He was one of those whom Richelieu charged with criticising Le Cid.

== Madrigal ==
Quand je voy vos beaux yeux si brillans et si doux,
Qui n'ont plus désormais rien à prendre que vous,
Leur éclat m'est suspect, et pour vous j'appréhende.
Souvent ce riche don est chérement vendu :
Je sçay que ma beauté ne fut jamais si grande,
Et pourtant chacun sçait comme elle m'a perdu.

(When I see your eyes so bright and so sweet,
Which no longer have anything but you to take,
Their shine I suspect, and I dread for you.
Often this rich gift is dearly sold :
I know that my beauty was never so great,
And yet each knew that she had lost me.)

(Placed in the mouth of the lover in the Guirlande de Julie. See the collection "Prestige de l'Académie française", Lettres de Monsieur de Voiture [...] suivies de La Guirlande de Julie, Paris, 1969, p. 263.)
