= Sylviane Agacinski =

French philosopher

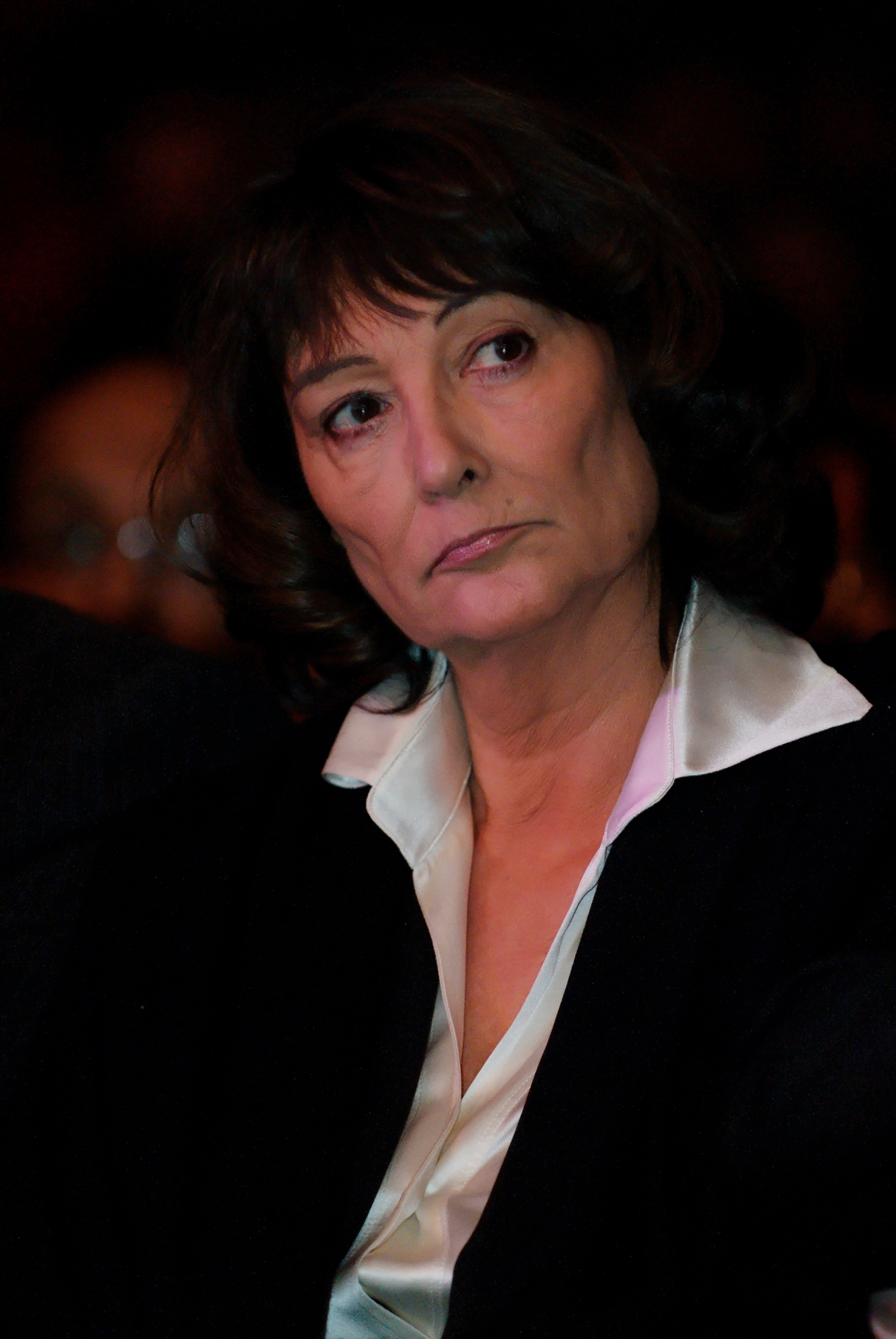
- Sylviane Agacinski in 2008
- Born: Sylviane Agacinski; 4 May 1945 (age 81); Nades, France
- Occupation: Philosopher
- Spouse: Lionel Jospin (m. 1994; died 2026)

Sylviane Agacinski-Jospin (French: [silvjan aɡazɛ̃ski ʒɔspɛ̃]; born 4 May 1945) is a French philosopher, feminist, author, professor at the École des hautes études en sciences sociales (EHESS), and widow of Lionel Jospin, former Prime Minister of France. Her theoretical articulation of parity inspired the French law which requires every political party to fill 50 percent of all candidacies in every seat with women.

== Family life ==
Agacinski's parents were immigrants from Poland, and her sister is French actress Sophie Agacinski. Agacinski is the mother of a son by philosopher Jacques Derrida, who directed the EHESS, and she became the stepmother of Lionel Jospin's two children with their marriage.

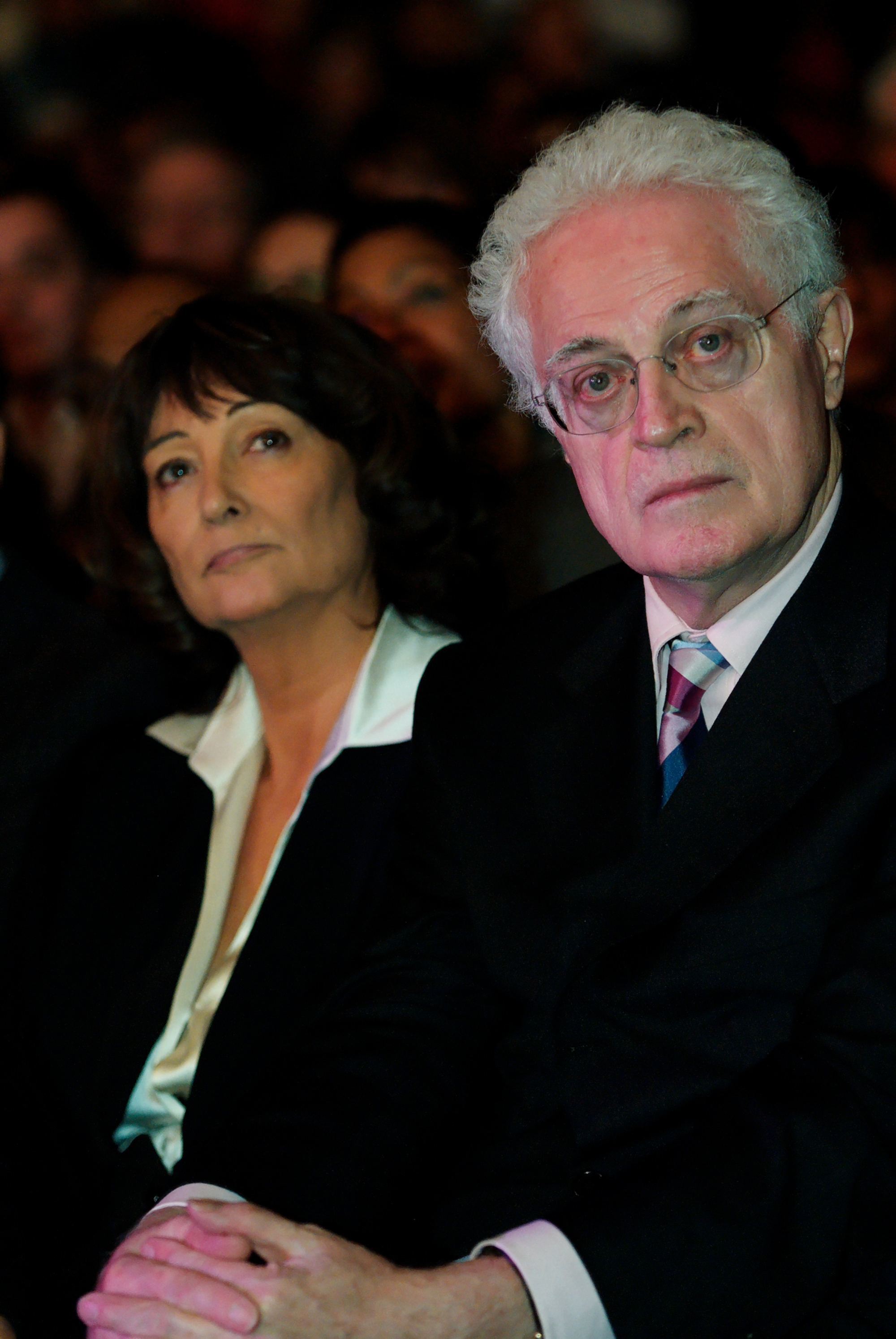
Sylviane Agacinski with husband Lionel Jospin, 2008.

== Lionel Jospin ==
Agacinski met Jospin in 1983, at her sister Sophie's wedding. They married 11 years later. She stayed on the sidelines in Jospin's candidacy for president in 1995, but was much more active in his candidacy for president in 2002. At that time she changed her name to Agacinski-Jospin to "bow to the will of the people", but continues to use her maiden name as a philosopher. In the fall of 2002, after Jospin's surprise exclusion from the runoffs to Jacques Chirac and Jean-Marie Le Pen, Agacinski published Journal Interrompu, a book about the election in diary form, blaming Chirac, the French media, and the French left's internal rivalries. Jospin died on 22 March 2026.

== Philosophy ==
As a feminist philosopher, Agacinski is associated with "differentialism", an important strain of French feminism, which argues that the human condition cannot be understood in any universal way without reference to both sexes. She's cited as writing, "We want to keep the freedom to seduce and be seduced. There will never be a war of the sexes in France," in her 1998 book, Sexual Politics.

=== Parité amendment ===
In 1999, Agacinski was a leading originator of a bill to amend article three of the Constitution of France to include a phrase stating: "The law will encourage equal access for women and men to political life and elected posts." With Jospin's support, the so-called "Parité" ("Parity") amendment was made on June 28, 1999, and was followed by a law, on May 3, 2000, obliging the country's political parties to present 50% female candidacies in virtually any race, or lose a corresponding share of their governmental campaign funding. In the 2002 legislative elections, the first under the new law, Le Pen's National Front was among the few parties to come close to meeting the law, with 49% female candidates; Jospin's Socialists had 36%, and Chirac's UMP had 19.6%.

== Bibliography ==
- Aparté. Conceptions et morts de Søren Kierkegaard, Aubier, 1978
- Critique de l'égocentrisme. La question de l'Autre, Galilée, 1994
- Volume. Philosophie et politique de l'architecture, Galilée, 1996
- Le Drame des sexes. Ibsen, Strindberg, Bergman, Seuil, coll. « Librairie du XXI^{e} siècle », 2008
- Corps en miettes, éd. Flammarion, 2009. Critique de la marchandisation du corps humain.
- L’homme désincarné. Du corps charnel au corps fabriqué, Gallimard, coll. Tracts, 2019
