= Claude Boyer =

French clergyman, playwright, apologist and poet (1618–1698)

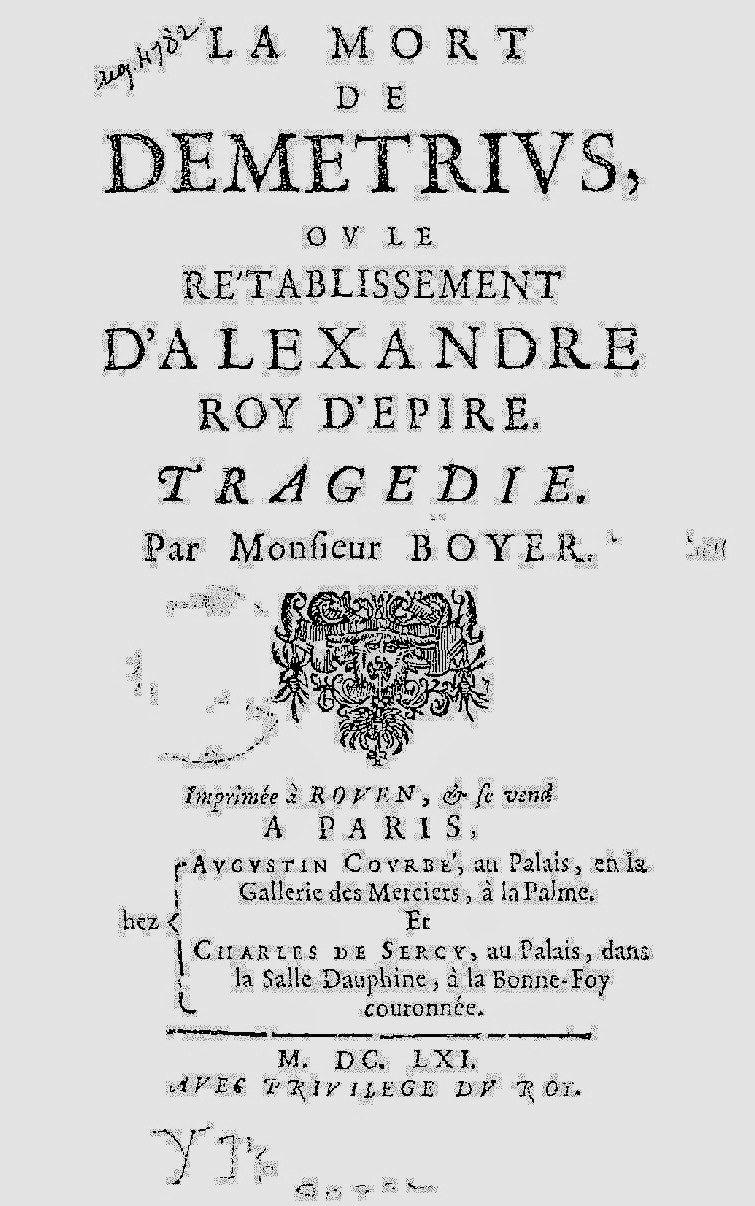
Title page of The Death of Demetrius

Claude Boyer (1618 in Albi – 22 July 1698 in Paris) was a French clergyman, playwright, apologist and poet. Contrary to a popular belief, he was never abbot. Claude Boyer was educated by the Jesuits, where he excelled in rhetoric. His classmate Michel Le Clerc, who like him wrote tragedies and was elected to the French Academy, became one of his closest friends. In 1645, Boyer moved to Paris where he attended exhibitions and produced his first play, The Roman Portia, played at the Hôtel de Bourgogne in 1646. The play was a great success. Throughout his career some thirty plays, most of which were tragedies, experienced great success. The tragedy The Loves of Jupiter and Semele in 1666 was a triumph. When one of the highest literary authorities of the seventeenth century, Jean Chaplain, composed around 1662 a paper on literary men of his time, he thought of Claude Boyer.

== Sources ==
- Jean-Paul C. Montagnier, “Claude Boyer librettiste: remarques sur Méduse,” Revue d’histoire du théâtre 191 (1996), pp. 303–320.
