= Antoine-Louis Séguier =

French lawyer and magistrate

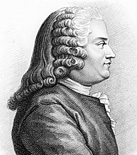
Antoine-Louis Séguier (1726–1792)

Antoine-Louis Séguier (1 December 1726 in Paris – 26 January 1792 in Tournai) was a French lawyer and magistrate.

== Biography ==
Séguier became avocat du roi in 1748, avocat général to the Grand Conseil in 1751, then to the Parlement of Paris in 1755. As a protégé of Louis XV he was elected a member of the Académie française in 1757, though the only written works he produced were some discourses, mémoires and réquisitoires. An opponent of Enlightenment philosophers, whom he called an "impious and audacious sect" and denounced as "false wisdom", he emigrated in 1790 at the start of the French Revolution and died in what is now Belgium two years later.
