= Octave Gréard =

French educator (1828–1904)

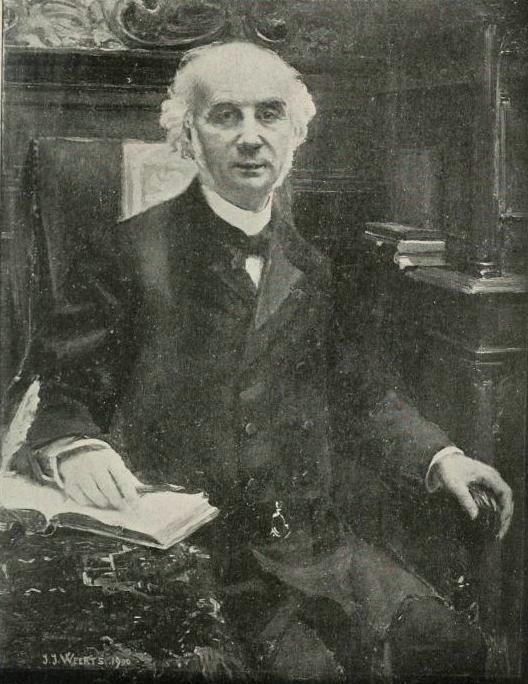
1901 portrait of Gréard by Jean-Joseph Weerts

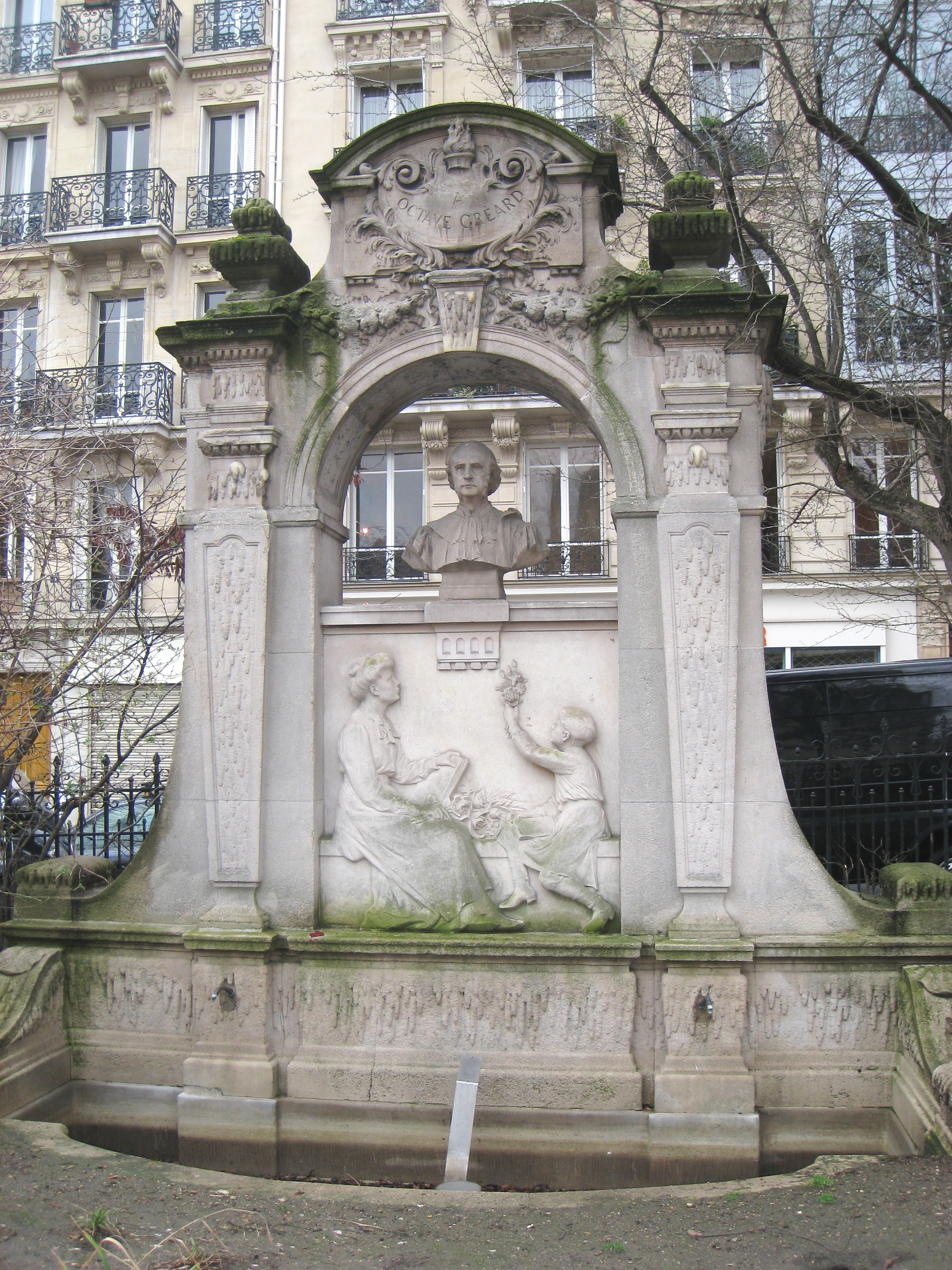
Monument to Octave Gréard, Henri Paul Nénot, architect

Octave Gréard (18 April 1828 – 25 April 1904) was a noted French educator.

Gréard was born in Vire, Calvados, educated at the École Normale Supérieure, and had a long career in education. He was largely responsible for the establishment of schools for girls and played a significant role in reforming the baccalauréat.

Gréard was elected member of the Académie des sciences morales et politiques in 1875 and the Académie française in 1886. A college bearing his name is located in the 8th arrondissement of Paris.

== Works ==
- L'Enseignement secondaire des filles (Secondary education of girls)
- L’Éducation des femmes par les femmes (Education for women by women)
- Étude sur les Lettres d'Abélard et d'Héloïse (Review of Letters of Abelard and Heloise)
- Nos adieux à la vieille Sorbonne (Our farewell to the old Sorbonne)
