= Gilles Ménage =

French scholar (1613–1692)

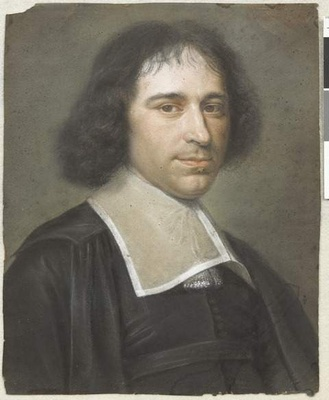
- Portrait, by Bernard Vaillant, thought to be of Ménage

Gilles Ménage (French: [ʒil menaʒ]; 15 August 1613 – 23 July 1692) was a French scholar.

== Biography ==
He was born at Angers, the son of Guillaume Ménage, king's advocate at Angers. A good memory and enthusiasm for learning carried him quickly through his literary and professional studies, and he practised at the bar at Angers before he was twenty. In 1632, he pleaded several causes before the parlement of Paris.

Illness caused him to abandon the legal profession for the church. He became prior of Montdidier without taking holy orders, and lived for some years in the household of Cardinal de Retz (then coadjutor to the Archbishop of Paris), where he had leisure for literary pursuits.

Some time after 1648, he quarrelled with his patron and withdrew to a house in the cloister of Notre-Dame de Paris, where he gathered round him on Wednesday evenings those literary assemblies which he called "Mercuriales." Jean Chapelain, Paul Pellisson, Valentin Conrart, Jean François Sarrazin and Du Bos were among the habitués. He was tutor to Marie-Madeleine Pioche de la Vergne, comtesse de la Fayette, later the great writer, to whom he was very attached. He was admitted to the Accademia della Crusca of Florence, but his caustic sarcasm led to his exclusion from the Académie française. Ménage made many enemies and suffered under the satire of Boileau and of Molière. Molière immortalized him as the pedant Vadius in Les Femmes savantes, a portrait Ménage pretended to ignore.

In 1664 he published at London an edition of the Lives of Eminent Philosophers by Diogenes Laërtius that contains an unedited anonymous life of Aristotle; this life was known as 'Vita Menagiana' before the critical edition by Ingemar Düring, (Aristotle in the Ancient Biographical Tradition Stockholm: Almqvist & Wiksell 1957; reprinted New York, Garland, 1987, pp. 80–93) with the title 'Vita Hesychii' (the attribution to Hesychius of Miletus is controversial). In 1690, he also published a supplement to the work of Diogenes Laërtius titled Historia Mulierum Philosopharum. It is more than a scholarly compilation of 65 women philosophers he had found from his studies of the books of ancient writers. He intended to create a history for these women and dedicated his work to Anne Lefevre Dacier (1654 – 17 August 1720), whom he described in his introduction as "the most learned of women whether of the present or the past."

Ménage died in Paris in 1692. After his death his friends published, under the title of Menagiana, a collection of his witticisms and table talk. The edition of this collection by Bernard de la Monnoye (2 vols., 1693/4) has found favor.

== Works (partial list) ==
- Poemata latina, gallica, graeca, et italica (1656)
- Observationes et emendationes in Diogenem Laertium Paris 1663 (reprint: London, 1664; Amsterdam, 1692)
- Origini della lingua italiana (1669)
- Dictionnaire etymologique (1650 and 1670)
- Observations sur la langue française (1672–1676)
- Histoire de Sablé (1686) A second part of this work was edited from the manuscript and published by J. B. Haureau in 1873.
- Anti-Baillet (1690)
- Historia mulierum philosopharum (1690) - French language translation as: "Histoire des femmes philosophes", Gilles Ménage; 2006, Paris; Editions Arléa (Translated into French from Latin by Manuella Vaney with an introduction by Claude Tarrene); 96 pages, ISBN 2-86959-719-3 - (See: https://web.archive.org/web/20141013152817/http://www.arlea.fr/Histoire-des-femmes-philosophes,649 ).

== English translations ==
- The History of Women Philosophers translated from Latin with an introduction by Beatrice H. Zedler, Lanham: University Press of America (1984)
