= Valentin Conrart =

French author

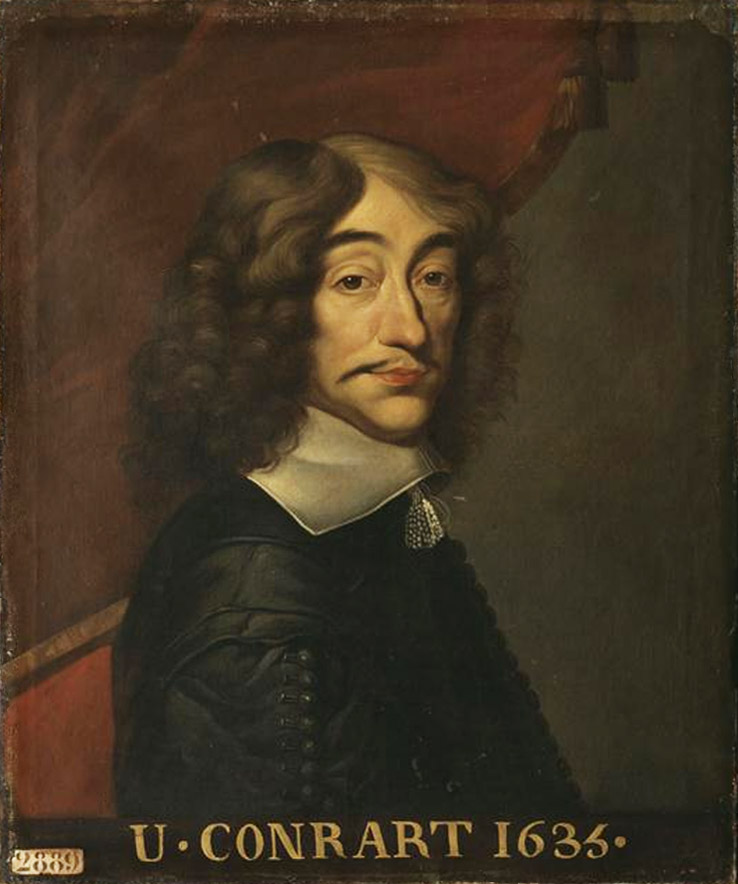
Valentin Conrart, 1635.

Valentin Conrart (French: [valɑ̃tɛ̃ kɔ̃ʁaʁ]; 1603 – 23 September 1675) was a French writer, and as a founder of the Académie Française, the first occupant of seat 2.

== Biography ==
Conrart was born in Paris to Calvinist parents and received an education in business. After his father's death in 1620, he began to move in literary circles and soon acquired a reputation, though he wrote nothing for many years. He was made councilor-secretary to the king in 1627; in 1629, his house became a meeting place for a group of writers who met to talk over literary subjects and to read and mutually criticize their works.

In 1635, Cardinal Richelieu suggested that the group become a formal literary company; Conrart was subsequently appointed as secretary, and after Richelieu's endorsement of the rules Conrart drafted, King Louis XIII sanctioned the foundation of the Académie française to regulate French spelling, grammar, and literature. Conrart served the academy as secretary for over forty years until his death in 1675.

== Works ==
Very little of Conrart's written works were published during his lifetime, though his Mémoires sur l'histoire de son temps was later published by Louis Monmerqué in 1825.

== See also ==
- Guirlande de Julie
- Hercule Audiffret

== Bibliography ==
- R. Kerviler and Édouard de Barthélemy, Conrart, sa vie et sa correspondance (1881);
- C.B. Petitot, Mémoires relatifs à l'histoire de France, tome xlviii.;
- Sainte-Beuve, Causeries du lundi (19 juillet 1858).
