= Pierre-Joseph Thoulier d'Olivet =

French abbot, writer, grammarian and translator (1682–1768)

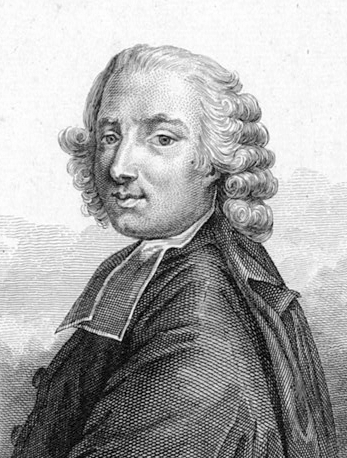
L'abbé d'Olivet. Portrait after Charles André van Loo.

Pierre-Joseph Thoulier d'Olivet, Abbot of Olivet (1 April 1682, Salins-les-Bains – 8 October 1768, Paris) was a French abbot, writer, grammarian and translator. He was elected the fourth occupant of Académie française seat 31.

== Life ==
Olivet's father was a counselor in the Parlement of Dole.

Olivet joined the Jesuits and studied at the Jesuit colleges of Rheims, Dijon, and Paris, writing poetry and Latin prose, before leaving the Jesuits in 1713.

He co-founded the Academy of Besançon.

== Publications ==
His publications include;

- Translation of Cicero (1740-1742, 9 vols. 4to)
- Histoire de l'Academie Franqaise (1729, 2 vols. 4to; 1730, 2 vols. 12mo)
