= Jean Chapelain =

French poet and critic (1595–1674)

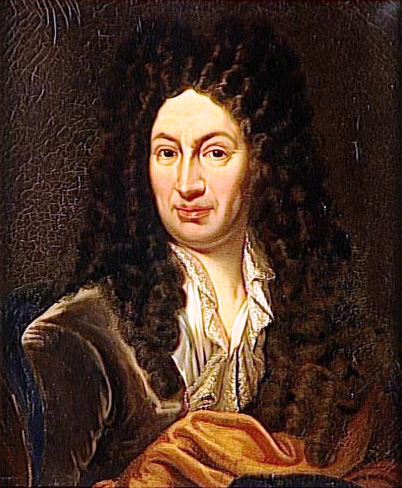
- An anonymous portrait of Chapelain
- Born: 4 December 1595; Paris, France
- Died: 22 February 1674 (aged 78); Paris, France
- Occupations: Critic, poet
- Writing career
- Period: Grand Siècle
- Notable works: "Sentiments de l’Académie sur le Cid" "La Pucelle"
- Literary movement: Neoclassicism

Jean Chapelain (4 December 1595 – 22 February 1674) was a French poet and critic during the Grand Siècle, best known for his role as an organizer and founding member of the Académie française. Chapelain acquired considerable prestige as a literary critic, but his own major work, an epic poem about Joan of Arc called "La Pucelle," (1656) was lampooned by his contemporary Nicolas Boileau-Despréaux.

== Background ==
Chapelain was born in Paris. His father wanted him to become a notary, but his mother, who had known Pierre de Ronsard, had decided otherwise.

== Early education ==
At an early age Chapelain began to qualify himself for literature, learning, under Nicolas Bourbon, Greek and Latin, and teaching himself Italian and Spanish.

== Tutor ==
Having finished his studies, Chapelain taught Spanish to a young nobleman for a short time, before being appointed tutor to the two sons of Sébastien Le Hardy, lord of la Trousse, grand-prévôt de France, Gouye de Longuemarre, ""Eclaircissemens sur un officier de la maison de nos rois, appelé roi des ribauds", in Constant Leber, ed. Collection des meilleurs dissertations, notices et traités particuliers relatifs à l'histoire de France, part V (1838:234) notes Nicolas Hardi, sieur de la Trousse, grand-prévôt de France; his son Sébastien inherited in 1595; "a M. de la Trousse, grand provost of France". Attached for the next 17 years to this family and given the responsibility of administering their fortune, he seems to have published nothing then but to have acquired a great reputation for potential.

== Author ==
His first published work was a preface for the Adone of Giambattista Marino, who printed and published that notorious poem at Paris. It was followed by a translation of Mateo Alemán's novel, Guzmán de Alfarache and by four extremely indifferent odes, one of them addressed to Cardinal Richelieu.

In a conversation with Richelieu in about 1632, reported by the abbé d'Olivet, Chapelain maintained the importance of maintaining the unities of time, place and action, and it is explicitly stated that the doctrine was new to the cardinal and to the poets who were in his pay. Rewarded with a pension of a thousand crowns and from the first an active member of the newly constituted Academy, Chapelain drew up the plan of the grammar and dictionary, the compilation of which was to be a principal function of the young institution, and at Richelieu's command drew up the Sentiments de l’Académie sur le Cid.

The credit of introducing the law of the dramatic unities into French literature has been claimed for many writers, and especially for the Abbé d'Aubignac, whose Pratique du théâtre appeared in 1657. Aristotle's theory had of course been enunciated in the Art poétique of Julius Caesar Scaliger in 1561, and subsequently by other writers, but undoubtedly it was the action of Chapelain that transferred it from the region of theory to that of actual practice. In 1656 he published, in a magnificent format, the first twelve cantos of his celebrated epic on Joan of Arc, La Pucelle, on which he had been working for twenty years. Six editions of the poem were disposed of in eighteen months. This was the end of the poetic reputation of Chapelain, "the legist of Parnassus." Later the slashing satire of Nicolas Boileau-Despréaux resulted in Chapelain ("Le plus grand poète Français qu'ait jamais été et du plus solide jugement," as he is called in Colbert's list) taking his place among the failures of modern art.

== Critic ==
Chapelain's reputation as a critic survived, and in 1663 he was employed by Colbert to draw up an account of contemporary men of letters, destined to guide the king in his distribution of pensions. In this pamphlet, as in his letters, he shows to far greater advantage than in his unfortunate epic. His prose is incomparably better than his verse; his criticisms are remarkable for their justice and generosity; his erudition and kindliness are well-attested; the royal attention was directed alike towards the author's firmest friends and bitterest enemies. To him the young Jean Racine was indebted not only for advice, but also for the pension of six hundred livres which was so useful to him. The catholicity of Chapelain's taste is shown by his De la lecture des vieux romans (printed 1870), in which he praises the chanson de geste, forgotten by his generation.

Chapelain refused many honours, and his disinterestedness makes it necessary to receive with caution the stories of Gilles Ménage and Tallemant des Réaux, who claimed that he became a miser, and that a considerable fortune was found hoarded in his apartments when he died.

== See also ==
- Guirlande de Julie
