= Grand prix Gobert =

The grand prix Gobert is one of the prizes of the French Academy. It has been awarded every year in the field of History since 1834.

It was instituted by the Foundation created by the estate of Baron Gobert Napoleon (1807–1833), son of general Jacques-Nicolas Gobert, and is intended to reward "the most eloquent piece of history of France, or the one whose merits will approach it the most". (Note: "le morceau le plus éloquent d’histoire de France, ou celui dont le mérite en approchera le plus" (Académie française 2012).)

== Laureates ==
List of laureates
Year	Name(s) of laureate(s)	Title of the work
...		
1850	Albin de Chevallet	Origine et formation de la langue française
...		
1859	Pierre Adolphe Chéruel	L'administration monarchique en France
1859	Théophile-Sébastien Lavallée	Histoire des Français
1859	Henri Martin	Histoire de France
1860	Ernest Moret	Quinze ans du règne de Louis XIV
1860	Henri-Alexandre Wallon	Jeanne d'Arc
1861	Jean-Marie Dargaud	Histoire de la liberté religieuse
1861	Nicolas Eugène Géruzez	Histoire de la littérature française
1861	Charles de Lacombe	Henri IV et sa politique
1862	Jules Caillet	L'administration sous Richelieu
1862	Camille Rousset	Histoire de Louvois
1863	Charles Caboche	Les mémoires et l'Histoire de France
1863	Camille Rousset	Histoire de Louvois
1864	Charles Caboche	Les mémoires et l'Histoire de France
1864	Camille Rousset	Histoire de Louvois
1865	Théophile-Sébastien Lavallée	Les frontières de France
1865	Auguste Trognon	Histoire de France
1866	Théophile-Sébastien Lavallée	Les frontières de France
1866	Charles de Viel-Castel	Histoire de la Restauration
1867	J. A. Félix Faure	Histoire de saint Louis
1867	Charles de Viel-Castel	Histoire de la Restauration
1868	Camille Dareste	Histoire de France
1868	J. A. Félix Faure	Histoire de saint Louis
1869	Camille Dareste	Histoire de France depuis les origines jusqu’au règne de Louis XV
1869	Alfred Nettement	Histoire de la conquête d’Alger
1870	Louis-Mortimer Ternaux	Histoire de la Terreur
1870	Alfred Nettement	Histoire de la conquête d’Algérie
1871	Jean-Pierre Clément	Lettres, instructions et mémoires de Colbert
1871	Ernest Mourin	Les Comtes de Paris. Histoire de l’avènement de la troisième race
1872	Jean-Pierre Clément	Lettres, instructions et mémoires de Colbert
1872	Ernest Mourin	Les Comtes de Paris. Histoire de l’avènement de la troisième race
1873	Alfred Nettement	Histoire de la Restauration
1873	François-Tommy Perrens	L’Église et l’État en France sous Henri IV, et la régence de Marie de Médicis
1873	Georges Picot	Histoire des États généraux
1874	Adolphe Mathurin de Lescure	Henri IV
1874	Georges Picot	Histoire des États généraux
1875	Adolphe Mathurin de Lescure	Henri IV
1875	Casimir Gaillardin	Histoire du règne de Louis XIV
1876	Casimir Gaillardin	Histoire du règne de Louis XIV
1876	Michel Houssaye	Histoire du Cardinal de Bérulle
1877	Michel Houssaye	Histoire du Cardinal de Bérulle
1877	Alphonse-Anatole Vétault	Charlemagne
1878	Régis de Chantelauze	Le cardinal de Retz et l’affaire du chapeau
1879	Régis de Chantelauze	Le cardinal de Retz et ses missions diplomatiques à Rome
1879	François-Désiré Mathieu	L’ancien régime dans la province de Lorraine et Barrois (1696–1789)
1879	Léonce Pingaud	Les Saulx-Tavannes. Correspondance des Saulx Tavannes au XVIe siècle
1880	Pierre Adolphe Chéruel	Histoire de France pendant la minorité de Louis XIV
1880	François-Désiré Mathieu	L’ancien régime dans la province de Lorraine et Barrois (1696–1789)
1881	Pierre Adolphe Chéruel	Histoire de France pendant la minorité de Louis XIV
1881	Berthold Zeller	Richelieu et les ministres de Louis XIII (1621–1624). Le connétable de Luynes, Montauban et la Valteline
1882	Pierre Adolphe Chéruel	Histoire de France pendant la minorité de Louis XIV et Histoire de France sous le ministère de Mazarin
1882	Berthold Zeller	Richelieu et les ministres de Louis XIII (1621–1624). Le connétable de Luynes, Montauban et la Valteline
1883	Pierre Adolphe Chéruel	Histoire de France sous le ministère Mazarin (1651–1661)
1883	Ludovic Sciout	Histoire de la constitution civile du clergé (1790–1801)
1884	René de Maulde-La Clavière	Histoire de Jeanne de France, duchesse d’Orléans et de Berry
1884	Léon Gautier	La Chevalerie
1885	Paul Thureau-Dangin	Histoire de la monarchie de juillet
1885	Henri Pigeonneau	Histoire du commerce de la France
1886	Paul Thureau-Dangin	Histoire de la monarchie de juillet
1886	Francis Decrue	Anne de Montmorency
1887	Arthur Chuquet	La première invasion prussienne (11 août-2 septembre 1792). Valmy. La retraite de Brunswick
1888	Henri-François Delaborde	Étude historique sur l’expédition de Charles VIII en Italie
1888	Albert Sorel	L’Europe et la Révolution française
1889	Edmond Biré	Paris en 1793
1889	Georges d'Avenel	Richelieu et la monarchie absolue
1890	Hervé de Broc	La France sous l’ancien régime
1890	Henri Doniol	Histoire de la participation de la France à l’établissement des États-Unis d’Amérique
1891	Alfred Baudrillart	Philippe V et la cour de France
1891	Arthur Chuquet	Les guerres de la Révolution. Jemmapes. La trahison de Dumouriez
1892	Hector de la Ferrière	Marguerite d’Angoulême. Lettres de Catherine de Médicis
1892	Charles de Loménie	Les Mirabeau
1893	Marcel Marion	Machault d’Arnouville et le contrôleur général des finances (1749–1754)
1893	Albert Vandal	Napoléon et Alexandre 1er
1894	Albert Vandal	Napoléon et Alexandre 1er
1894	Louis Wiesener	Le régent, l’abbé Dubois et les Anglais, d’après les sources britanniques
1895	Hector de la Ferrière	Les deux Cours de France et d’Angleterre : deux drames d’amour (Anne Boleyn, Élisabeth). La correspondance de Catherine de Médicis.
1895	Gustave Charles Fagniez	Le Père Joseph et Richelieu (1577–1638)
1896	Ernest Daudet	La police et les Chouans sous le Consulat et l’Empire (1800–1815)
1896	Gabriel Hanotaux	Histoire du cardinal Richelieu
1897	Charles de Lacombe	La vie de Berryer
1897	Charles Kohler	Les Suisses dans les guerres d’Italie (1506–1512)
1898	Charles de Ribbe	La société provençale à la fin du moyen âge
1898	Henri Welschinger	Le roi de Rome (1811-32) et l’ensemble de ses ouvrages
1899	Alfred Baudrillart	Philippe V et la Cour de France
1899	Pierre Lehautcourt	La défense nationale (1870-71)
1900	Pierre de la Gorce	Histoire du Second Empire
1900	Pierre Lehautcourt	Les campagnes de 1870
1901	Alfred Baudrillart	Philippe V et la cour de France
1901	Arsène Legrelle	La diplomatie française et la succession d’Espagne
1902	Prosper Cultru	Dupleix, ses plans politiques, sa disgrâce
1902	Camille Jullian	Vercingétorix
1903	Pierre de Vaissière	Gentilshommes campagnards de l’ancienne France
1903	Pierre de Nolhac	La Création de Versailles
1904	Pierre de Ségur	Le tapissier de Notre-Dame : les dernières années du maréchal de Luxembourg, 1678–1695
1904	Louis Thouvenel	Pages du second Empire
1905	Ernest Daudet	Histoire de l’émigration pendant la Révolution française
1905	André Lebey	Le connétable de Bourbon
1906	Henri Bonnal	La Rome de Napoléon
1906	Louis Madelin	L’esprit de la guerre moderne
1907	Léon de Lanzac de Laborie	Paris sous Napoléon
1907	Victor Dupuis	La campagne de 1793 à l’armée du Nord et des Ardennes
1908	Paul Courteault	Blaise de Monluc, historien
1908	Camille Jullian	Histoire de la Gaule
1909	Joseph Nouaillac	Villeroy, secrétaire d’État et ministre de Charles IX, Henri III et Henri IV (1543–1610)
1909	Ferdinand Chalandon	Histoire de la domination normande en Italie et en Sicile
1909	Fortunat Strowski	Histoire du sentiment religieux en France au XVIIe siècle. Pascal et son temps
1910	Erik Wilhelm Dahlgren	Les relations commerciales et maritimes entre la France et les côtes de l’Océan Pacifique
1910	Christian Pfister	Histoire de Nancy
1911	Louis Batiffol	Le roi Louis XIII à vingt ans
1911	Joseph Bédier	Les légendes épiques. Recherches sur la formation
1912	Pierre Champion	Vie de Charles d’Orléans (1394–1465)
1912	Louis Madelin	La Révolution
1913	Amblard-Marie-Raymond-Amédée de Noailles	Épisodes de la guerre de Trente ans. Bernard de Saxe-Weimar (1604–1639). Le cardinal de La Valette (1635–1639). Le maréchal de Guébriant (1602–1643)
1913	Augustin Sicard	Le Clergé de France pendant la Révolution. L’Effondrement. Les évêques pendant la Révolution. De l’exil au Concordat
1914	Pierre Champion	François Villon, sa vie et son temps
1914	Auguste-Armand de la Force	Lauzun, un courtisan du Grand Roi
1915	Marcel-Louis Hennequin	Paul Vidal de La Blache
1916	Ernest-Charles Babut	Marcel-Louis Hennequin
1917	Roger Chauviré	Jean Bodin, auteur de la République
1917	Barthélémy Pocquet du Haut-Jussé	Histoire de la Bretagne
1918	Édouard Driault	Napoléon et l’Europe
1918	Pierre de Nolhac	Histoire du château de Versailles
1919	Louis Battifol	Les anciennes républiques alsaciennes
1919	Marcel Marion	Histoire financière de la France depuis 1715
1920	Charles de la Roncière	Histoire de la marine française
1920	Jean Hippolyte Mariéjol	Catherine de Médicis (1519–1589)
1921	Alfred Boulay de la Meurthe	Histoire de la négociation au Concordat de 1801
1921	Eugène Lavaquery	Le cardinal de Boisgelin (1732–1804)
1922	Rodolphe Reuss	Histoire de Strasbourg
1922	Auguste-Armand de la Force	Le grand Conti
1923	Frantz Funck-Brentano	L’histoire de France racontée à tous : le moyen âge
1923	Louis Gillet	Histoire de la nation française, tome XI : Histoire des Arts
1924	Gabriel Esquer	Les commencements d’un empire. La prise d’Alger
1924	Émile Lauvrière	Tragédie d’un peuple, histoire du peuple acadien
1925	Émile le Gallo	Les Cent jours
1925	Robert Parisot	Histoire de Lorraine
1926	Augustin Cochin	Les sociétés de Pensée et la Révolution en Bretagne
1927	Édouard Driault	Napoléon et l’Europe. La chute de l’Empire (1812–1815)
1927	Georges Hardy	Le cardinal de Fleury et le mouvement janséniste
1927	Louis Alexis Emmanuel Marcel	Le cardinal de Givry, évêque de Langres
1928	Émile de Perceval	Le vicomte Lainé (1767–1835)
1928	Alfred Albert Martineau	Dupleix et l’Inde française
1929	Jean Longnon	Les Français d’outre-mer au moyen âge
1929	René Pinon	Histoire diplomatique de l’histoire de la nation française
1930	Henri Leclercq	Les journées d’octobre et la fin de l’année 1789. Vers la Fédération. La Fédération
1930	Paul Lévy (linguist)	Histoire linguistique d’Alsace et de Lorraine
1931	Émile Gabory	L’Angleterre et la Vendée
1931	Marie de Roux	La Restauration
1932	Augustin Bernard	François 1er
1932	Antoine de Lévis Mirepoix	L'Algérie
1933	Jean-Marie Carré	Voyageurs et écrivains français en Égypte
1933	Pierre Coste	Le grand saint du grand siècle, M. Vincent
1933	René La Bruyère	Henri IV, Charlotte de la Trémoille et son page
1933	Jean Thiry	Le Sénat de Napoléon. Rôle du Sénat de Napoléon dans l'organisation militaire de la France impériale
1934	Louis Réau	Histoire de l'expansion de l'art français moderne
1934	William Sérieyx	Le général Fabvier
1935	René Grousset	Histoire des croisades et du royaume franc de Jérusalem
1935	Charles-Hippolyte Pouthas	Une famille de bourgeoisie française de Louis XIV à Napoléon
1936	Edmond Durtelle de Saint-Sauveur	Histoire de Bretagne des origines à nos jours
1936	André Lasseray	Les Français sous les treize étoiles
1937	Paul Azan	L'armée d'Afrique de 1830 à 1852
1937	Paul Marrès	Les Grands-Causses
1938	Joseph Brugerette	Le prêtre français et la société contemporaine
1938	Marc-André Fabre	Les drames de la Commune
1939	Jean Leflon	Étienne-Alexandre Bernier, évêque d'Orléans
1939	Georges Sangnier	La Terreur dans le district de Saint-Pol
1940	Paul Filleul	Le duc de Montmorency-Luxembourg
1940	Jean Thiry	La Chute de Napoléon
1941	Henri Chamard	Histoire de la Pléiade
1941	Jean-Michel Tourneur-Aumont	La bataille de Poitiers
1942	Henri le Marquant	Tourville
1942	Philippe Sagnac	La Fin de l'Ancien Régime et la Révolution américaine
1943	Louis André (historian)	Michel Le Tellier et Louvois
1943	Jean Bourdon	La Magistrature sous le Consulat et l'Empire
1944	Émile Dard	Le comte de Narbonne
1944	Félix Ponteil	La fin de Napoléon
1945	Paul Bastid	Doctrines et institutions politiques de la seconde République
1945	Ernest Labrousse	La crise de l'économie française à la fin de l'ancien Régime et au début de la Révolution
1946	Pierre Gaxotte	La France de Louis XIV
1946	Pierre Rain	L'Europe de Versailles
1947	Charles Joubert	La Marine française
1947	André Latreille	L'Église catholique et la Révolution française
1948	Henri Carré	Le grand Carnot
1948	Antoine de Lévis-Mirepoix	La France de la Renaissance
1949	Jean de la Tousche d'Avrigny	Monsieur Henri. Henri de la Rochejaquelain
1949	Marie-Madeleine Martin	Histoire de l'Unité française
1950	Charles Aimond	Histoire religieuse de la Révolution dans le département de la Meuse et du diocèse de Verdun (1789–1802)
1950	Pierre Bessand-Massenet	Les deux France 1799–1804
1951	Georges Bonnet	Ferdinand de Lesseps
1951	Pierre Saint-Marc	Émile Ollivier
1952	Jean Duhamel	Louis-Philippe et la première entente cordiale
1952	Pierre Rain	Ensemble de son œuvre
1953	Jacques Hérissay	La vie religieuse à Paris sous la Terreur
1953	Georges Rigault	Histoire générale de l'Institut des Frères des Écoles chrétiennes
1954	Paule-Henry Bordeaux	Louise de Savoie Régente et "Roi" de France
1954	Jacques Silvestre de Sacy	Le comte d’Angiviller
1955	Henri Fréville	L’Intendance de Bretagne (1689–1790)
1955	Armand Sauzet	Desaix le « Sultan juste »
1956	Guillaume de Bertier de Sauvigny	La Restauration
1956	François Piétri	Ensemble de son œuvre historique
1957	André Fugier	Napoléon et l’Italie. La Révolution française et l’Empire napoléonien
1957	Marcel Rousselet	Histoire de la magistrature française
1958	Louis Borne	L’Instruction populaire en Franche-Comté avant 1792
1958	Bernardine Melchior-Bonnet	Napoléon et le Pape
1959	Gabriel Auphan	La Marine française pendant la seconde guerre mondiale
1959	Jean-François Gravier	Paris et le désert français
1959	Jacques Mordal	La Marine française pendant la seconde guerre mondiale
1960	Roger Dion	Histoire de la vigne et du vin en France, des origines au XIXe siècle
1960	Albert Ollivier	Le 18 brumaire
1961	François Bluche	Les magistrats du Parlement de Paris au XVIIIe siècle
1961	Jean-Jacques Hatt	Histoire de la Gaule romaine
1962	Henri Amouroux	La vie des Français sous l’occupation
1962	Pierre Grosclaude	Malesherbes, témoin de son temps
1963	Henri-Paul Eydoux	La France antique
1963	Robert Lacour-Gayet	Calonne
1964	Jacques Hillairet	Dictionnaire des rues de Paris
1964	Joël Le Gall	Alésia
1964	Jacques Roger	Les sciences de la vie dans la pensée française du XVIIIe siècle
1965	Robert Christophe	Danton
1965	Paul Ganière	Napoléon à Sainte-Hélène
1966	Émile Coornaert	Les Compagnonnages
1966	Roger Glachant	Histoire de l’Inde des Français
1967	Paul Bastid	Benjamin Constant et sa doctrine
1967	Robert Christophe	Le siècle de M. Thiers
1968	Henry Bergasse	Histoire de l’Assemblée
1968	Édouard Bonnefous	Histoire de la IIIe République
1968	Jean Delumeau	La civilisation de la Renaissance
1968	Édith Thomas	Rossel
1969	Claude Dulong	L’Amour au XVIIe siècle
1969	Philippe Erlanger	Clémenceau
1970	Henri Michel	L'Histoire de la Seconde Guerre mondiale
1970	Marianne Cermakian	La Princesse des Ursins, sa vie et ses lettres
1970	Michel Roquebert	L'Épopée cathare (1198–1212)
1971	Jean Tulard	Nouvelle Histoire de Paris : le Consulat et l'Empire
1971	Michel Antoine	Le Conseil du Roi sous le règne de Louis XV
1972	Anne Denieul-Cormier	Paris à l'aube du Grand Siècle
1972	Maurice Baumont	For all his work (Note: Pour l'ensemble de son œuvre)
1973	Charles Higounet	Histoire de Bordeaux
1973	Raoul Girardet	L'idée coloniale en France
1974	Jean Rouvier	Les Grandes Idées politiques des origines à J.-J. Rousseau
1974	Georges Gusdorf	L'avènement des sciences humaines au siècle des Lumières
1975	Bernard Simiot	Suez, cinquante siècles d'histoire
1975	Louis Chevalier	Histoire anachronique des Français
1976	Armand Lunel	Juifs du Languedoc, de la Provence et des États français du Pape
1976	Yves-Marie Bercé	Histoire des Croquants
1977	Georges Duby	Le temps des cathédrales
1977	Jacques Bariety	Les Relations franco-allemandes après la Première Guerre mondiale
1978	Robert Mandrou	L'Europe absolutiste. Raison et raison d’État (1649–1775)
1978	Étienne Taillemite	Bougainville et ses compagnons autour du Monde (1766–1769)
1979	Jean Rouvier	Les Grandes Heures de Toulouse
1979	Pierre de Gorsse	Les Grandes Idées politiques de Jean-Jacques Rousseau à nos jours
1980	Pierre Chevallier	Louis XIII
1980	Ivan Cloulas	Catherine de Médicis
1981	Jean Favier	La Guerre de Cent Ans
1981	Claude Dulong	Anne d'Autriche
1982	Pierre Chaunu	Histoire et décadence
1982	Edmond Pognon	La Vie quotidienne en l'an mille
1983	Jean-François Chiappe	La Vendée en armes
1983	Michel Poniatowski	Talleyrand et le Directoire
1984	Jean-Denis Bredin	L'Affaire
1984	Pierre Miquel	La Grande Guerre
1985	Pierre Goubert	Initiation à l'Histoire de France
1985	Gabriel de Broglie	Madame de Genlis
1986	Marc Vigié	Les Galériens du roi
1986	Ivan Cloulas	Henri II
1987	Pierre Grimal	Cicéron
1987	Louis-Eugène Mangin	Le général Mangin
1987	Pierre Antonetti	Sampiero, soldat du roi et rebelle corse
1988	Jean-Paul Bled	François-Joseph
1988	Inès Murat	La Seconde République
1989	Jean-François Sirinelli	Histoire et Pouvoirs de l'écrit
1989	Henri-Jean Martin	Génération intellectuelle
1990	Michel Antoine	Louis XV
1990	Jean-Luc Chartier	De Colbert à l'Encyclopédie
1991	Maurice Agulhon	La République, de 1880 à nos jours
1991	Emmanuel de Waresquiel	Le Duc de Richelieu
1992	Roger Chartier	For all his work
1993	Pierre Nora	Lieux de mémoire
1994	Jean Meyer	Bossuet
1995	François Furet	Le Passé d'une illusion. Essai sur l'idée communiste au XXe
1996	Jacques Le Goff	Saint-Louis, and for all his other work
1997	Régine Pernoud	For all her work
1998	Jacques Heers	Jacques Cœur, and for all his other work
1999	Bernard Quilliet	La France du beau XVIe
1999	Michel Fleury	For all his other work
2000	Alain Corbin	For all his work
2001	Venceslas Kruta	For all his work
2001	Pierre Pierrard	Les Celtes
2002	Jean-Jacques Becker	For all his work
2003	Jean Lacouture	For all his work on biographies
2004	Mona Ozouf	For all of her historical work
2005	Bartolomé Bennassar	La Guerre d'Espagne et ses lendemains
2006	Joël Cornette	Histoire de la Bretagne et des Bretons (deux volumes, Le Seuil), and for all his other work
2007	Paul Veyne	For all his work
2008	Pierre Blet	For all his work
2009	Guy Thuillier	For all his work
2010	Jean-Louis Crémieux-Brilhac	Georges Boris. Trente ans d’influence. Blum, de Gaulle, Mendès France and for all his other work
2011	Michel Winock	Madame de Staël and for all his other work
2012	Colette Beaune	For all her work
2013	Jacques Julliard	Les Gauches françaises
2014	Patrice Gueniffey	Bonaparte
2015	Olivier Grenouilleau	Qu’est-ce que l’esclavage ? Une histoire globale
2016	Henry Laurens	La Question de Palestine
2016	Daniel Roche	Histoire de la culture équestre (XVIe-XIXe siècle)
2017	Jean-Pierre Rioux	Ils m’ont appris l’histoire de France and for all his other work
2018	Pascal Ory	Peuple souverain. De la révolution populaire à la radicalité populiste and for all his other work
2019	Philippe Joutard	La Révocation de l’édit de Nantes ou les Faiblesses d’un État and for all his other work
2020	Krzysztof Pomian	Le Musée, une histoire mondiale and for all his other work
2021	François Hartog	Chronos. L’Occident aux prises avec le temps

== See also ==
- List of history awards
