= Pierre Gaxotte =

French historian

Pierre Gaxotte (19 November 1895 – 21 November 1982) was a French historian. He was born in Revigny en Barrois now called Revigny-sur-Ornain, Meuse.

== A life of historian of the modern period and journalist too ==
He was a student at the higher normal school of the rue d'Ulm. Received first in the aggregation exam, he begins a long study on provincial "intendants" of the "Ancien Régime", a thesis that he does not finish or support.

He began his career as a history teacher at the Lycée Charlemagne. He is famous for his critical vision of the French Revolution, notably in The French Revolution (1928), and for his rehabilitation of the French 18th century (Louis XV's Century, 1933).

Private secretary of Charles Maurras, "royalist of reason", like Jacques Bainville, he improvised himself as a journalist by participating in the foundation of "Candide", weekly gaining an intellectual success. He is also known as a far-right-wing journalist of the Entre-deux-Guerres period, with links to the Action française and the newspaper Je suis partout. He left the position of editor at the newspaper in 1937, being replaced by Robert Brasillach.

By no means adhering to collaboration, he followed with low enthusiasm the first steps of the Vichy regime. Since 1942, he believes in the allied victory. He later worked as a columnist for Le Figaro.

As an editor, he directs the famous yellow collection of Fayard, entitled "Les grandes études historiques" (The great historical studies). Over the course of his life, he authored numerous historical studies, and was elected to the Académie française in 1953.

Pierre Gaxotte lived in a building on Froidevaux street near the Montparnasse cemetery. He trained many students in history, for example Denis Richet, Michel Antoine, Jacques Van den Heuvel, Emmanuel Le Roy Ladurie and François Bluche. He was at the end of his life an astonishing reincarnation of Voltaire by his attitudes and words of imitation. He had published a political fiction in the line of Voltaire’s tales, "Le Nouvel Ingénu".

== Works in English translation ==
- The French Revolution, C. Scribner's Sons, 1932.
- Louis XV and His Times, J. B. Lippincott Co., 1934.
- Frederick the Great, G. Bell and Sons, 1941 [Rep. by Yale University Press, 1942; Greenwood Press, 1975].
- The Age of Louis XIV, Macmillan, 1970.
