= Julian Jackson =

Julian Jackson may refer to:

- Julian Jackson (geographer) (1790–1853), British geographer
- Julian Jackson (historian) (born 1954), British historian
- Julian Jackson (boxer) (born 1960), boxer from the U.S. Virgin Islands
