= Après moi, le déluge =

French phrase

"Après moi, le déluge" (pronounced [apʁɛ mwa lə delyʒ]; lit. 'After me, the flood') is a French expression attributed to King Louis XV, or in the form "Après nous, le déluge" (pronounced [apʁɛ nu lə delyʒ]; lit. 'After us, the flood') to Madame de Pompadour, his favourite. It is generally regarded as a nihilistic expression of indifference to whatever happens after one is gone. Its meaning was translated in 1898 by E. Cobham Brewer in the forms "When I am dead the deluge may come for aught I care", and "Ruin, if you like, when we are dead and gone".

One account says that Louis XV's downcast expression while he was posing for the artist Maurice Quentin de La Tour inspired Madame de Pompadour to say: "Il ne faut point s'affliger; vous tomberiez malade. Après nous, le déluge." (Note: transl. "There is no need to grieve; you'll make yourself ill. After us, the deluge.") Another account states that the Madame used the expression to laugh off ministerial objections to her extravagances. The phrase is also often seen as foretelling the French Revolution and the corresponding ruin brought to France.

The phrase is believed to date from after the 1757 Battle of Rossbach, which was disastrous for the French.

== Alternate interpretations ==
Biographer Michel Antoine thought that the remark "Après moi, le déluge" was actually a prediction that the upcoming passing of Halley's Comet in 1759 would cause a literal flood, similar to the Genesis flood having been blamed on it as well. (Note: This is also suggested within the Mould dictionary entry, by its cross-reference to the biblical entry for "Déluge", therein. See Mould, op. cit.)

== Literary and other uses ==
=== Literature prior to 19th century ===
An expression carrying a similar meaning, "Εμοῦ θανόντος γαῖα μιχθήτω πυρί", meaning "After my death, let the world burn!", can be found in The Twelve Caesars. An anonymous character proclaims it, implying that this expression is already a common proverb.

A phrase of similar meaning to the title phrase is attributed to the Arabic poet Abu Firas al-Hamdani who died in 968 AD; the phrase translates as, "If I die of thirst, may it never rain again". The phrase in the original text is "إذا مِتُّ ظمآنًا فلا نزلَ القطرُ".

=== Literature in and after the 19th century ===
Karl Marx used the phrase in Das Kapital (1867) stating, "Après moi, le déluge! is the watchword of every capitalist and of every capitalist nation."

Fyodor Dostoevsky applies the phrase in his writings to describe the selfishness and apathy of certain corrupting values. He used it in The Idiot, (serialised beginning in 1868) as an epigraph for an article written by one of the characters of the novel. During the trial of Dimitri Fyodorovich Karamazov in The Brothers Karamazov (serialised beginning in 1879), the prosecution uses the expression to describe the attitude of the defendant's reprobate father and to lament the deterioration of Russian values more generally.

=== Literature in the 20th century ===
Arthur Moeller van den Bruck was fond of using the phrase, as in:

The liberal has flourished at all periods. The nobody is always eager to imagine himself a somebody. The man who is a misfit in his own society is always a liberal out of amour propre. The disinterestedness of the conservative cherishes the sacredness of a cause that shall not die with him; the liberal says: Après moi, le déluge. Conservatism is rooted in the strength of man; liberalism battens on his weakness. The liberal's conjuring trick consists in turning others' weakness to his own account, living at other men's expense, and concealing his art with patter about ideals. This is the accusation against him. He has always been a source of gravest danger.

D. H. Lawrence used the phrase in "Whitman" (1923), calling it "the soul's last shout and shriek, on the confines of death". In other of his writings of the 1920s, Lawrence uses the expression a number of times, calling it "the tacit utterance of every man", in his "crisis" of unbearable "loneliness ... surrounded by nullity". But "you mustn't expect it to wait for your convenience," he warns the dissolute "younger generation"; "the real deluge lies just ahead of us".

Kurt Vonnegut uses "Après moi le déluge" in his novel Player Piano (1952), when the main character Paul talks to Doctor Pond.

Jack Kerouac's last essay, titled "After Me, the Deluge", was published in the Los Angeles Times on 26 October 1969, five days after his death. It is a somewhat bitter reconsideration of the so-called Beat Generation, which he was credited with inspiring.

=== In popular culture ===
Singer-songwriter Regina Spektor included "Après moi, le déluge" in the chorus of her song "Après Moi" from her 2006 album Begin to Hope, a song later covered by Peter Gabriel in his album Scratch My Back.

== See also ==
- Flood myth
- Let them eat cake
- No. 617 Squadron RAF

== Sources ==
- Ammer, Christine (2013). "Après moi le déluge". The Dictionary of Clichés: A Word Lover's Guide to 4,000 Overused Phrases and Almost-Pleasing Platitudes. Dictionary of Clichés. New York: Skyhorse Publishing. pp. 10f. ISBN 978-16263-6011-2. "après moi le déluge After I'm dead nothing will matter. This cliché, literally meaning "after me, the flood," was allegedly said in slightly different form in 1757 by Madame de Pompadour to Louis XV after Frederick the Great defeated the French and Austrians at Rossbach. (She put it après nous le déluge, "after us the flood.") The flood alludes to the biblical flood in which all but those in Noah's ark perished. The phrase is still always stated in French."
- Antoine, Michel (1989) [1982]. Louis XV. Collection Pluriel (in French). Vol. 8571. Paris, France: Fayard/Hachette Pluriel. ISBN 9782010178184. A further relevant field may be ISBN 2010178181.
- Brewer, Ebenezer Cobham (1898). "Del'uge". Dictionary of Phrase and Fable. p. 342 – via Internet Archive. "Del'uge. After me the Deluge ["Aprés moi le Déluge"]. When I am dead the deluge may come for aught I care. Generally ascribed to Prince Metternich, but the Prince borrowed it from Mme. Pompadour, who laughed off all the remonstrances of ministers at her extravagance by saying, "Aprés nous le déluge" (Ruin if you like, when we are dead and gone)."
- Farlex, Inc. Staff (2015). "Apres moi le deluge". Dictionary.com (Farlex Dictionary of Idioms). Huntingdon Valley, PA: Farlex, Inc.
- Mould, Michael (2011). "Popular cutural references (Ch. 1): Après moi, le déluge". The Routledge Dictionary of Cultural References in Modern French (1st ed.). Milton Park, Oxfordshire, England: Taylor & Francis. pp. 3, 43. doi:10.4324/9780203830925. ISBN 9780203830925.
- Nishitani, Keiji (1990). The Self-Overcoming of Nihilism. Nazan studies in religion and culture, SUNY series in modern Japanese philosophy. Translated by Graham Parkes; with Setsuko Aihara. Albany, NY: State University of New York Press. p. 132. ISBN 0791404382. "Dostoevsky's figures voluntarily leap into nihilism and try to be themselves within its boundaries. The nihility expressed in "If there is no God, everything is permitted,"... or "après moi le déluge," provides a principle whose sincerity they try to live out to the end."
- Price, Steven D. (2011). "Après moi le deluge [sic.]". Endangered Phrases. Huntingdon Valley, PA: Farlex, Inc. "Karl Marx, who repeated the phrase in his Das Kapital: 'Après moi le déluge! is the watchword of every capitalist and of every capitalist nation. Hence capital is reckless of the health or length of life of the labourer, unless under compulsion from society.'"
- Oxford University Press (OUP) (2024). "Après nous le déluge". Lexico.com. Oxford, England: Lexico/OUP. Archived from the original on 22 September 2020. "après nous le déluge ... 'After us the flood.' Used to express complete indifference to what may happen when one is gone. / Origin / Early 19th century; earliest use found in Richard Edgeworth (1744–1817), educational writer and engineer. From French après nous le déluge, lit. 'after us the flood,' reputed comment of Madame de Pompadour to Louis XV after the French defeat at Rossbach in 1757 from après after + nous us + le the + déluge, apparently as alteration of après moi le déluge."
