= Chauviré =

Chauviré is a surname. Notable people with the surname include:

- Cécile Mourer-Chauviré (born 1939), French paleontologist
- Roger Chauviré (1880–1957), French writer
- Yvette Chauviré (1917–2016), French prima ballerina and actress
