= Antoine-Élisabeth-Cléophas Dareste de la Chavanne =

French historian

Antoine-Élisabeth-Cléophas Dareste de la Chavanne (28 October 1820 – 6 August 1882) was a French historian born in Paris, of an old Lyon family. He was the brother of Camille and Rodolphe Dareste de la Chavanne.

== Biography ==
Educated at the École des Chartes in Paris, he became professor in the faculty of letters at Grenoble in 1844, and in 1849 at Lyon, where he remained nearly thirty years. He died at Lucenay-lès-Aix (Nièvre département).

== Works ==
His works comprise:

- Histoire de l'administration en France depuis Philippe-Auguste (2 vols., 1848)
- Histoire des classes agricoles en France depuis Saint Louis jusqu'à Louis XVI (2 vols., 1853 and 1858), now quite obsolete
- Histoire de France (8 vols., 1865–1873)
- Histoire de la Restauration (2 vols., 1879), a good summary of the work of Louis, baron de Viel-Castel
- Histoire du Gouvernement de Juillet, a dry enumeration of dates and facts

Before the publication of Lavisse's great work, Dareste's general history of France was the best of its kind; it surpassed in accuracy the work of Henri Martin, especially in the ancient periods, just as Martin's in its turn was an improvement upon that of Sismondi.
