= Rodolphe Dareste de la Chavanne =

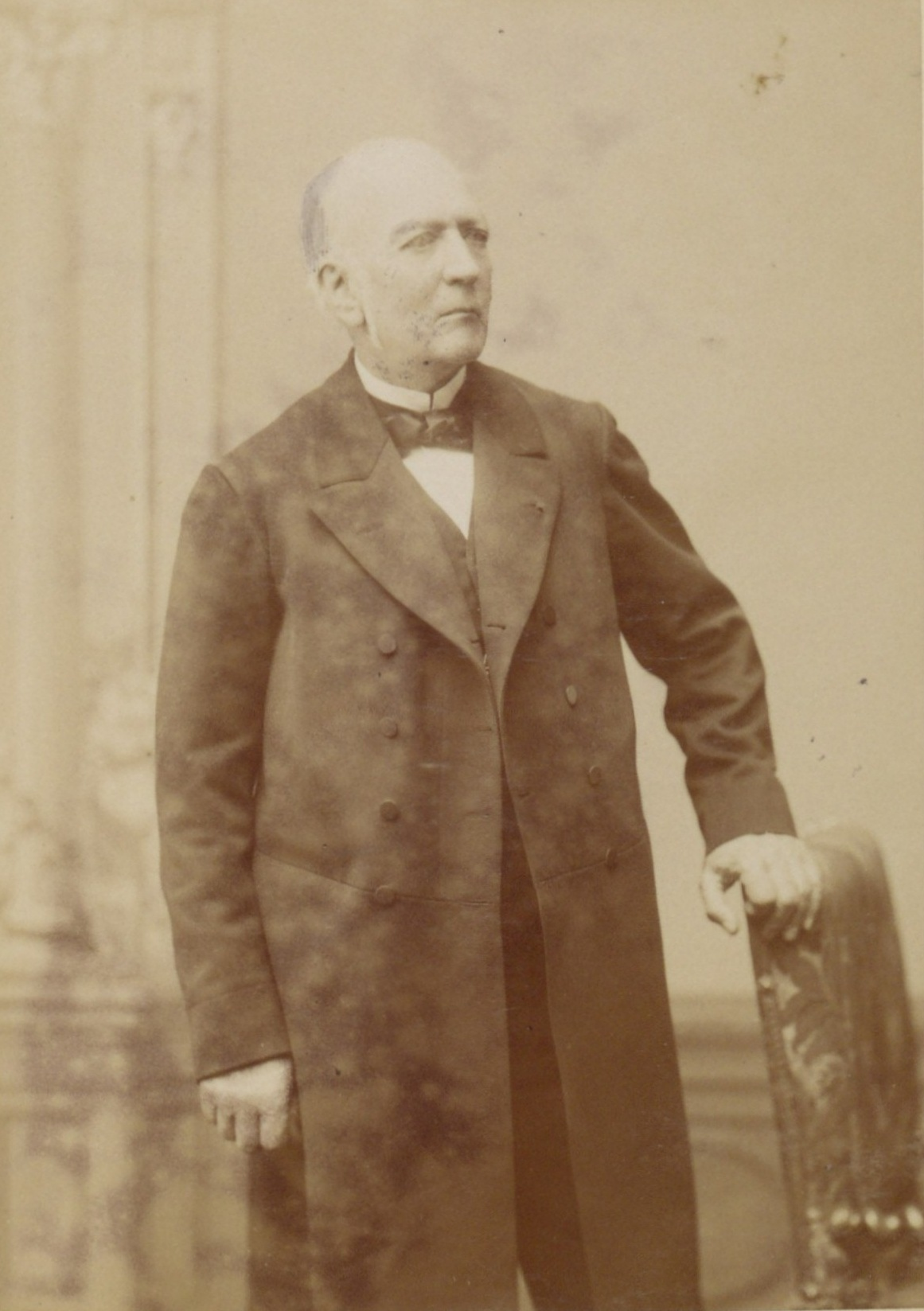
Rodolphe Dareste de La Chavanne

Rodolphe-Madeleine Cléophas Dareste de La Chavanne (December 25, 1824 – March 24, 1911) was a French jurist.

Born in Paris, he was the brother of Antoine and Camille Dareste de la Chavanne. he studied at the École des Chartes and the Faculty of Law of Paris, and starting early on a legal career he rose to be counsellor to the Court of Cassation (1877 to 1900). His first publication was an Essai sur François Hotman (1850), completed later by his publication of Hotman's correspondence in the Revue historique (1876), and he devoted the whole of his leisure to legal history.

Of his writings may be mentioned:

- Les Anciennes Lois de l'Islande (1881)
- Mémoire sur les anciens monuments du droit de la Hongrie (1885)
- Études d'histoire du droit (1889)

On Greek law he wrote some notable works:

- Du prêt à la grosse chez les Athéniens (1867)
- Les Inscriptions hypothécaires en Grèce (1885)
- La Science du droit en Grèce: Platon, Aristote, Théophraste (1893)
- Étude sur la loi de Gortyne (1885).

He collaborated with Theodore Reinach and B Haussoullier in their Recueil des inscriptions juridiques grecques (1905), and his name is worthily associated with the edition of Philippe de Beaumanoir's Coutumes de Beauvaisis, published by Salmon (2 vols., 1899, 1900).
