= Henri Welschinger =

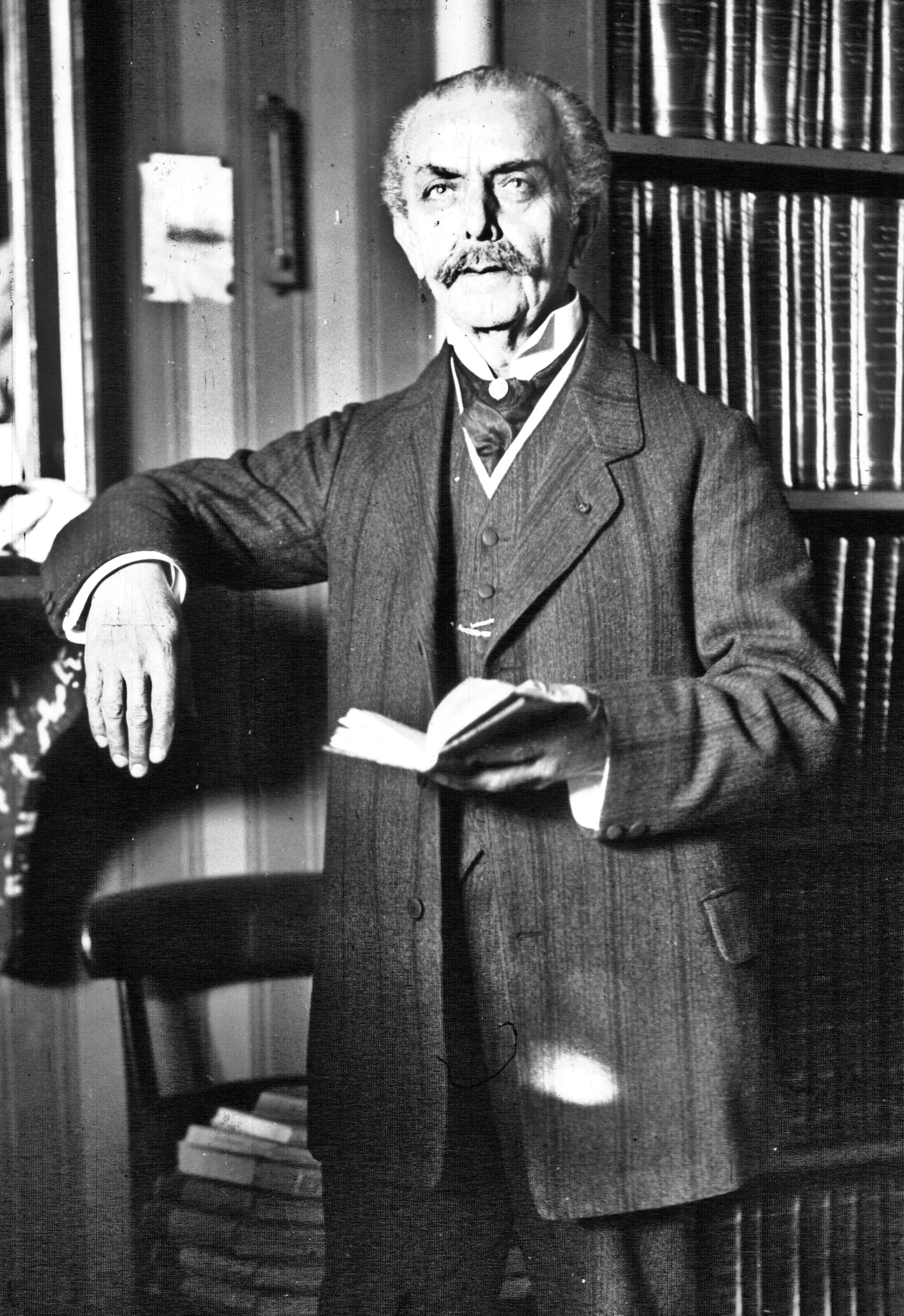
- Born: 2 February 1846; Muttersholtz
- Died: 3 November 1919
- Occupation: Historian
- Awards: Grand Prix Gobert (1898)

Henri Welschinger (1846–1919) was a French historian, journalist, and litterateur.

== Biography ==
Henri Welschinger was born on February 2, 1846, in Muttersholtz, a small village located eight kilometers from Sélestat, in the Bas-Rhin, France. He was educated at the petit seminaire of Notre-Dame-des-Champs in Paris where he received a classical education (Greek, Latin, Logic, Math). He began his career as an archivist at the National Assembly in 1867. Then, he was employed in the highest offices of the Senate. He was the director of law-drafting, legislative printing and cabinet minutes. He lived in the Luxembourg Palace for forty-two years. He was elected member of the Academy of Moral and Political Sciences in 1907, later holding the chair in philosophy and the history there.

Henri Welschinger died on November 3, 1919, in Viroflay, at age 73.

== Works ==
- (in French) Le Duc d'Enghien, 1772-1804 (1888)
- (in French) Le Maréchal Ney, 1815 (1893)

== Bibliography ==
- Strauss, Léon (2016). Nouveau dictionnaire de biographie alsacienne [Alsatian new biography dictionary] (in French). Vol. 40. Strasbourg: Fédération des sociétés d'histoire et d'archéologie d'alsace. p. 4163. Archived from the original on 2016-03-03. "Henri Welschinger"
