= André Alba =

French historian (1894–1979)

- Born: 6 May 1894; Bayonne, France
- Died: 28 January 1979 (aged 84); Clamart, France

Academic background
- Education: École Normale Supérieure

Academic work
- Discipline: history
- Institutions: lycée Henri-IV
- Notable works: Le Moyen Âge

André Alba (1894–1979), a graduate from the École Normale Supérieure and agrégé in history, was a professor of history in khâgne at lycée Henri-IV until 1959. He was one of the masters who formed generations of historians in France after the Second World War. He was the author of numerous textbooks.

== Textbooks ==
- Le Moyen Âge (classe de 5e), (Hachette)
- Histoire romaine (classe de 5e), with Jules Isaac and Albert Malet (Hachette)
- Le Moyen Âge (classe de 5e), (Hachette)
- Rome et le Moyen Âge jusqu'en 1328 (classe de 5e), (Hachette)
- Rome et les débuts du Moyen Âge (classe de 5e), (Hachette)
- Histoire contemporaine depuis le milieu du XIXe. Supplément 1919-1939 with Jules Isaac, (Hachette)
- Histoire contemporaine, de 1852 à 1939 (classes de philosophie, de mathématiques élémentaires) with Antoine Bonifacio and Jules Isaac, (Hachette)
- De 1848 à 1914 (classe de 1re, with Antoine Bonifacio, Jules Isaac and Jean Michaud (Hachette)
- L'Époque révolutionnaire de 1789 à 1851 (classe de 1re) with Jules Isaac and Charles-Hippolyte Pouthas, (Hachette)
- Les Temps modernes (classe de 4e) (Hachette)
- Histoire, de 987 à 1789 (classe de 4e moderne), (Hachette)
- La Fin du Moyen Âge, le XVIe et le XVIIe, à l'usage de la classe de 4e, (Hachette)
- Le Moyen Âge jusqu’à la guerre de Cent Ans with Jules Isaac and Albert Malet, (Hachette)
- De la Révolution de 1789 à la révolution de 1848 (classe de 2e), with Jules Isaac, Jean Michaud and Charles Hippolyte Pouthas (Hachette)
- L'Orient et la Grèce (classe de 6e) with Gaston Dez (Hachette)
- Histoire contemporaine (Classe de 3e). Troisième année des écoles primaires supérieures. (Hachette)
