= Louis Chevalier (historian) =

French historian (1911–2001)

- Born: 29 May 1911; L'Aiguillon-sur-Mer, Pays de la Loire, France
- Died: 3 August 2001 (aged 90)

Academic work
- Main interests: History of French culture and Paris

Louis Chevalier (29 May 1911, L'Aiguillon-sur-Mer, Vendée – 3 August 2001) was a French historian with interests in geography, demography and sociology. Much of his work was devoted to the history of French culture and Paris.

== Early life and education ==
Louis Chevalier was born in L'Aiguillon-sur-Mer in the coastal department of Vendée in western France. He was educated mainly in Paris and attended the lycée Henri IV, where he was a pupil of the famous teacher of philosophy known as Alain and also of the historian Charles-Hippolyte Pouthas. Chevalier entered the Ecole Normale Supérieure (ENS) in 1932, where a fellow student and close friend was the future president Georges Pompidou. He passed his agrégation in 1938 and entered an academic career. During World War II, he served as a tutor at the ENS and taught his history first course at the Ecole libre des sciences politiques in Paris. In 1946 the latter school became the elite Institut d'Études Politiques de Paris (more frequently known as "Sciences Po") and Chevalier was appointed to a professorship. Six years later he was elected to a chair in Parisian history at the Collège de France.

Among his students at Sciences Po was the future French prime minister Edouard Balladur.

== Career ==
Chevalier's most important works are Classes Laborieuses et Classes Dangereuses à Paris au XIX Siècle, published in 1958, a survey of the Parisian working class that challenged many assumptions of political historians about their work regimes and political activities and L'Assassinat de Paris, published in 1977.

Chevalier was awarded France's highest honor, the Legion d'honneur, in 1958; his initial decoration as a knight was upgraded to officier in 1967, and ultimately commandeur in 1977. In 1987, he was awarded the Grand Prix of the Académie des Sciences Morales et Politiques.

== Works ==
- Le problème démographique nord-africain, PUF, 1947
- La Formation de la population parisienne au XIXè siècle, PUF, collection Travaux et documents / Institut national d'études démographique, 1949, 312 p.
- Démographie générale, éd. Dalloz, 1951, 599 p.
- Leçon inaugurale faite le 28 avril 1952, Collège de France, Chaire d'histoire et structure sociales de Paris et de la région parisienne, Paris, Collège de France, 1952, 38 p.
- Madagascar, population et ressources, préface par Alfred Sauvy, PUF, collection Institut national d'études démographiques, Travaux et documents, 1952, 212 p., cartes.
- Classes laborieuses et classes dangereuses, Plon, collection Civilisations d'hier et d'aujourd'hui, 1958, XXVIII-566 p. Rééd. Paris, Le Livre de poche, collection Pluriel, 1978 (translated in English as Laboring Classes and Dangerous Classes: In Paris During the First Half of the Nineteenth Century, Howard Fertig, 2000)
- Les Parisiens, Hachette, 1967, 395 p. Rééd. Paris, Hachette, Collection Pluriel, 1985
- Histoire anachronique des Français, Plon, 1974 (Grand prix Gobert de l'Académie française), XII-346 p.
- L'Assassinat de Paris, Calmann-Lévy, Collection Archives des sciences sociales, 1977, 285 p. Rééd. éditions Ivrea, 1997, présentation par Claude Dubois (translated in English as The Assassination of Paris, University of Chicago Press, 1994)
- Montmartre du plaisir et du crime, collection Les Hommes et l'histoire, Robert Laffont, 1980, 452 p.-[20] p. de pl.,
- Histoire de la nuit parisienne : 1940-1960, Fayard, 1982
- Les Relais de mer. Un village de la côte vendéenne de la veille de la guerre de 14 aux lendemains de la Deuxième Guerre mondiale, Fayard, 1983
- Les Ruines de Subure : Montmartre, de 1939 aux années 80, Paris, R. Laffont, 1985, 370 p.-[16] p. de pl.,
- Juanito : Andalousie de boue et de sang, Paris, Stock, collection, Un Livre, une vie, 1990, 434 p.
- Splendeurs et misères du fait divers, Paris, Perrin, Collection Pour l’Histoire, 2003, 156 pages
