= Colette Beaune =

French historian

Colette Beaune (born 1943 in Chailles, Loire-et-Cher) is a French historian and professor emeritus at the University of Paris X – Nanterre.

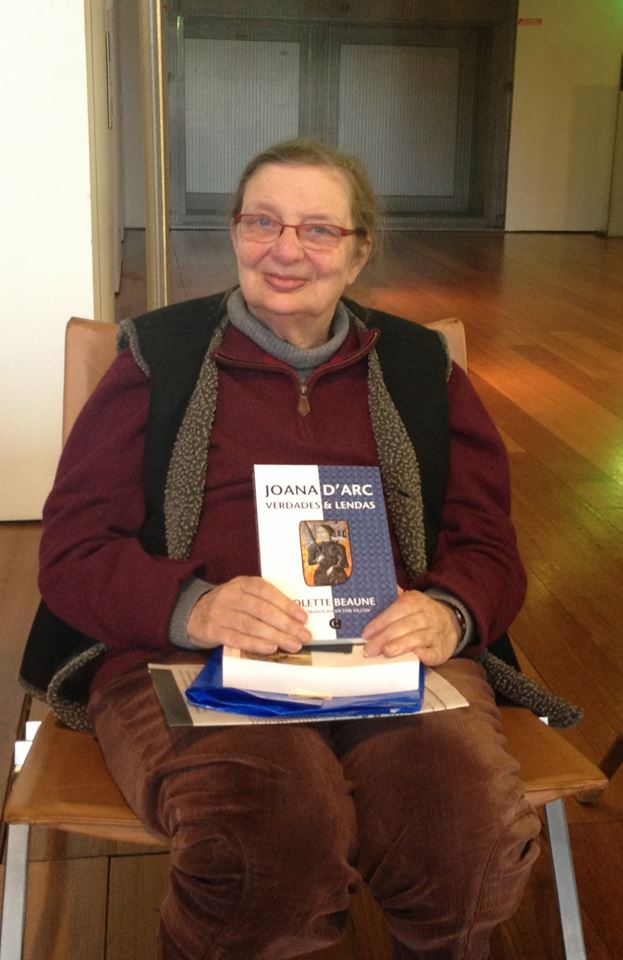
Colette Beaune

== Biography ==
Beaune was born in the town of Chailles, located in the department Loire-et-Cher, in 1943. She developed a passion for the study of Joan of Arc while reading the entirety of the documents related to Joan's trial during her second year of preparatory courses at her high school, the Lycée Molière, in Paris. She continued her studies at the École normale supérieure and received her agrégation for History in 1966. Her thesis for her habilitation, which she defended in 1984, was published in 1985 as La Naissance de la nation France. Initially a maître de conférences (a type of lecturer) at the University of Paris I – Sorbonne from 1985 to 1992, she spent the majority of her career as a professor at the University of Paris X – Nanterre (1992–2005).

== Work ==
Her research is primarily devoted to political history and women of France in the late Middle Ages. She is considered one of the leading experts on Joan of Arc.

Her books include:

- La Naissance de la Nation France. Paris: Gallimard, 1985; 2nd ed., 1993 (The Birth of an Ideology: Myths and Symbols of Nation in Late-Medieval France, by Colette Beaune and Fredric L. Cheyette. Berkeley: University of California Press, 1991)
- Le Miroir du Pouvoir. Paris, Hervas, 1989
- Le Journal d'un bourgeois de Paris: de 1405 à 1449. Paris: Librairie générale française (Le Livre de poche), 1989; 4th ed., 2009 (A Parisian Journal, 1405-1449. Trans. Janet Shirley. Oxford: Clarendon Press, 1968)
- Les manuscrits des rois de France au Moyen Âge. Paris: Bibliothèque de l'image, 1997
- Éducation et cultures du début du XII^{e} siècle au milieu du XV^{e} siècle. [Paris]: SEDES, 1999
- Jeanne d'Arc. Paris: Perrin, 2004
- Les Rois Maudits, l'enquête historique (preface), 2005
- Chronique dite de Jeanne de Venette. Paris: Librarie générale française, 2011
- Le Grand Ferré: premier héros paysan. Paris: Perrin, 2013

Her recent articles are on such topics as royal identity in 15th-century France and medieval women's libraries.

== Awards ==
She received the Prix du Sénat du Livre d' Histoire (Senate Prize for Best History) from the French Senate for Jeanne d' Arc (2004). In 2012, she was awarded the Grand prix Gobert by the Académie Française for her work as a whole.

== Controversy ==
In mid 2007, the French channel Arte filmed several interviews with renowned French historians, including Beaune, for the documentary Vraie Jeanne, fausse Jeanne , directed by Martin Meissonier. About a year after the filming, respondents found that the documentary was based on the sensational theories advocated by Marcel Gay and Roger Senzig in the book L' Affaire Jeanne d' Arc ; the historians interviewed had been unaware of this when approached to participate in the project. In response, Beaune updated her 2004 work on Joan of Arc to Jeanne d'Arc, vérités et légendes (Paris: Perrin, 2008) (Joan of Arc, Truths and Fictions).

== See also ==
- Journal d'un bourgeois de Paris
