= François Hartog =

French historian (born 1946)

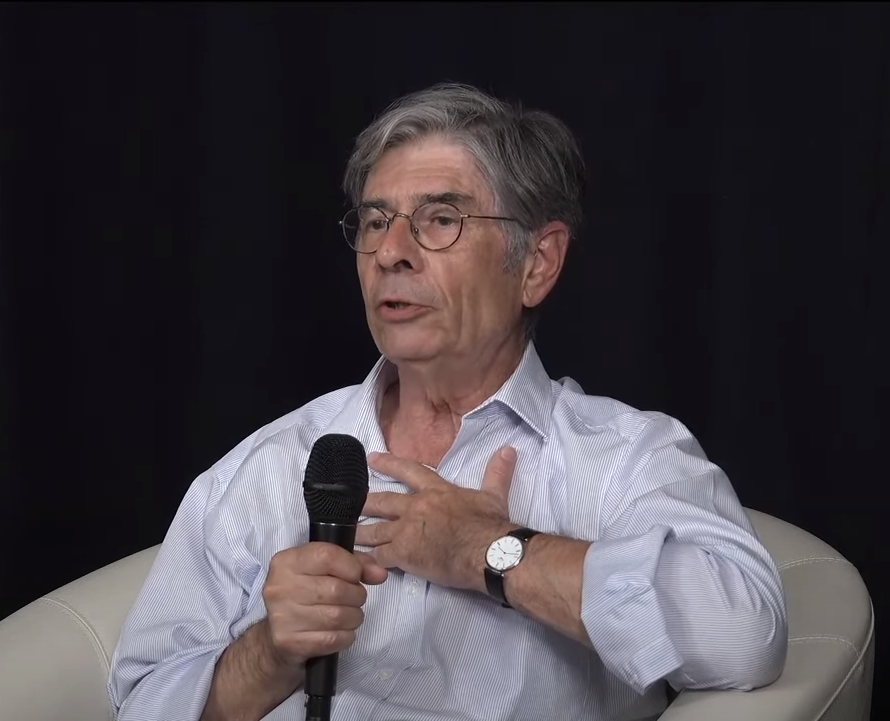
- François Hartog
- Born: 1946 (age 79–80); France
- Occupation: Historian
- Known for: Regime of historicity

Academic background
- Education: École normale supérieure
- Influences: Jean-Pierre Vernant, Reinhart Koselleck

Academic work
- Discipline: History
- Sub-discipline: Modern history, presentism
- Institutions: École des hautes études en sciences sociales (EHESS)
- Main interests: Ancient, modern historiography, temporality
- Notable ideas: Regime of historicity, presentism

François Hartog (born in 1946) is a French historian. He is noted for his "regimes of historicity" theory as well as his analyses of presentism and the contemporary experience of time. Hartog is also an academic and author of several works including The Mirror of Herodotus: The Representation of the Other in the Writing of History.

== Biography ==
Hartog was born in 1946. He studied at the École normale supérieure in Paris and was part of a group of Hellenist scholars who studied under Jean-Pierre Vernant. Later, Hartog became an assistant to the German historian Reinhart Koselleck. The two collaborated on several works, which included a project that described how the problems of modern time schema are not limited to an imperialist past or present. Hartog would later challenge what he perceived as Koselleck's Eurocentric reflection of the present and the past.

Hartog's works can be classified into two: his early works that focused on the intellectual history of ancient Greece; and, his recent publications, which emphasized the subject of temporality.

Hartog is currently a director of research at the École des hautes études en sciences sociales (EHESS) for ancient and modern historiography. He is also one of the 60 historians who founded the Association des Historiens in 1997. Hartog is a member of the Centre Louis Gernet de recherches comparées sur les sociétés anciennes.

== Regimes of Historicity ==
Hartog explored the relationship of the past, present, and future as understood at moments of crisis in history. Like other thinkers such as Hannah Arendt, Michel Foucault, and Reinhart Koselleck, Hartog maintains that there is no difference between past and present since all history is "actually contemporary history". Drawing from a broad range of sources, he published his analysis in the book Regimes of Historicity: Presentism and Experiences of Time. For instance, he used texts such as the Odyssey to demonstrate the threshold of historical consciousness.

According to Hartog, there are three regimes of historicity: the history of exemplary lives; the modern history that dates back from the French Revolution; and, the regime focused on the present as the primary referent for historical interpretation (late twentieth century). The "regimes of historicity" has been understood in two ways. The first asks how society treats its past and what it says about it while the second approaches the notion as the "modes of consciousness of human community".

In his analysis of the different "regimes of historicity", he described the modern period as "presentist" – that the present turns to the past and the future only to valorize the immediate. This "presentism" concept has been interpreted as that regime wherein the present is dominant. It implies an approach to temporality, which rejects the linear, causal, and homogeneous conception of time characteristic of the modern regime of historicity.

"Regimes of historicity" is considered a heuristic tool for further research concerning experiences of time. It has also been described as part of the cooperation among historians that allow adjustments in the interest of constructing conceptual categories and configurations that promote an understanding of "historical consciousness".

A criticism of the "regimes of historicity" cites the resulting "permanent lag" produced by the discrepancies that emerge from different histories and varying relationships within this new temporality. It is also suggested that it leads to the periodizations that suppress diversity of conceptions of time formulated within their limits.

== Hartog's Mirror ==
The concept of Hartog’s Mirror is developed by Francois Hartog in The Mirror of Herodotus: The Representation of the Other in the Writing of History. His argument is that Herodotus’s work while being held as an ethnography, is not actually describing other cultures, but describing Greekness in the inverse. He argues that the portrayal of these other cultures portrays exactly what the Greeks don’t want to be. To him, Herodotus tells us more about the Greek self-definition than about the cultures he describes since he presents their customs through a rhetoric of alterity.

== Honours and awards ==
=== Honours ===
- 2013: Knight of the Legion of Honour (France)
- 2001: Knight of the National Order of Merit (France)
- 1999: Knight of the Ordre des Palmes académiques (France)

=== Awards ===
- 2021: Grand prix Gobert
- 2006: Prix François-Millepierres of the Académie Française
- 1981: Prix Broquette-Gonin

=== Acknowledgement ===
- Member of the Academia Europaea
- Fellow of the Berlin Institute for Advanced Study

== Publications ==
- À la rencontre de Chronos (1970-2022), Paris, ed. CNRS, 2022.
- Confrontations avec l'histoire, Paris, ed. Gallimard, 2021.
- Chronos : L’Occident aux prises avec le Temps, Paris, ed. Gallimard, 2020.
- La nation, la religion, l'avenir : Sur les traces d'Ernest Renan, Paris, ed. Gallimard, 2017.
- Regimes of Historicity: Presentism and Experiences of Time, New York, ed. Columbia University Press, 2015.
- Partir pour la Grèce, Paris, ed. Flammarion, 2015.
- Croire en l'histoire, Paris, ed. Flammarion, 2013.
- La chambre de veille (with Felipe Brandi & Thomas Hirsch), Paris, ed. Flammarion, 2013.
- Vidal-Naquet, historien en personne, Paris, ed. La Découverte, 2007.
- Évidence de l'histoire. Ce que voient les historiens, Paris, ed. EHESS, 2005.
- Anciens, modernes, sauvages, Paris, ed. Galaade, 2005.
- Régimes d'historicité. Présentisme et expériences du temps, Paris, ed. Le Seuil, 2003.
- Histoire (Critical edition of Polibio), Paris, ed. Gallimard-Quarto, 2003.
- Les usages politiques du passé (with Jacques Revel), Paris, ed. EHESS, 2001.
- Vies parallèles (Plutarch critical edition), Paris, ed. Gallimard-Quarto, 2001.
- The Invention of History: The Pre-History of a Concept from Homer to Herodotus, "History and Theory", vol. 39, 2000.
- Pierre Vidal-Naquet a historien dans la cité (with Alain Schnapp and Pauline Schmitt-Pantel), Paris, ed. La Découverte, 1998.
- Des sciences et des techniques, co-directed with Roger Guesnerie, Paris, ed. EHESS, 1998.
- Mémoire d'Ulysse: récits sur la frontière in Grèce ancienne, Paris, ed. Gallimard, 1996 (Memory of Ulysses. Stories about the border in ancient Greece, FCE of SPAIN, 2007).
- Le XIXe siècle et l'histoire. Le cas Fustel de Coulanges, Paris, ed. PUF, 1988.
- Le Miroir d'Hérodote. Essai sur la représentation de l'autre, Paris, ed. Gallimard, 1980 (The mirror of Herodotus, FCE, 2003).
