= Historicity =

Historical actuality of persons or events

Historicity is the historical actuality of persons and events, meaning the quality of being part of history instead of being a historical myth, legend, or fiction. The historicity of a claim about the past is its factual status. Historicity denotes historical actuality, authenticity, factuality and focuses on the true value of knowledge claims about the past.

Some theoreticians characterize historicity as a dimension of all natural phenomena that take place in space and time. Other scholars characterize it as an attribute reserved to certain human occurrences, in agreement with the practice of historiography. Herbert Marcuse explained historicity as that which "defines history and thus distinguishes it from 'nature' or the 'economy'" and "signifies the meaning we intend when we say of something that is 'historical'." The Blackwell Dictionary of Western Philosophy defines historicity as "denoting the feature of our human situation by which we are located in specific concrete temporal and historical circumstances". For Wilhelm Dilthey, historicity identifies human beings as unique and concrete historical beings.

Questions regarding historicity concern not just the issue of "what really happened", but also how modern observers can come to know "what really happened". This second issue is closely tied to historical research practices and methodologies for analyzing the reliability of primary sources and other evidence. Because various methodologies thematize historicity differently, it is not possible to reduce historicity to a single structure to be represented. Some methodologies like historicism can make historicity subject to constructions of history based on submerged value commitments. The historiographer François Hartog introduced the notion of regimes of historicity to describe a society that considers its past and attempts to deal with it, a process that is also cited as "a method of self-awareness in a human community". The historicity of a reported event may be distinct from the historicity of persons involved in the event. For example, a popular story says that as a child, George Washington chopped down a cherry tree, and when confronted about it, honestly took responsibility for the act. Although there is no doubt that Washington existed as a historical figure, the historicity of this specific account has been found lacking.

Questions of historicity are particularly relevant to partisan or poetic accounts of past events. For example, the historicity of the Iliad has become a topic of debate because later archaeological finds suggest that the work was based on some true event.

Questions of historicity frequently arise in relation to historical studies of religion. In these cases, value commitments can influence the choice of research methodology.

== See also ==
- Historicity of the Bible
  - Historicity of Jesus
  - Historicity of the canonical Gospels
  - Historicism (Christian eschatology), a specific brand of Biblical literalism
- Historicity of Muhammad
- Historicity of Rama
- Historicity of the Buddha
- Historicity of the Book of Mormon
- Historicism
- Historical method
- Historicity of King Arthur
- Historicity of William Tell
- Historicity of Robin Hood
- Historicity of Ragnar Lodbrok
- Historicity of Laozi
- Parallelomania
- Temporality
