= Journal d'un bourgeois de Paris =

Medieval journal by a Parisian cleric

The Journal d'un bourgeois de Paris (English: The Diary of a Parisian Bourgeois) is an account of politics, war and everyday life in Paris covering the period between 1405 and 1449. The exact identity of its author is unknown. It has long been acknowledged as an invaluable source of information on the life and times of the city of Paris in the first half of the 15th century, a period marked by the Hundred Years' War and the English occupation of part of the kingdom of France.

The book title's reference to 'bourgeois de Paris' was first introduced by Denis Godefroy in his 1653 edition and has been retained in some subsequent editions. However, there are doubts about the accuracy of the reference to 'Bourgeois.' Many historians now believe that its author was not a bourgeois, but instead a member of the clergy.

== Subject matter ==
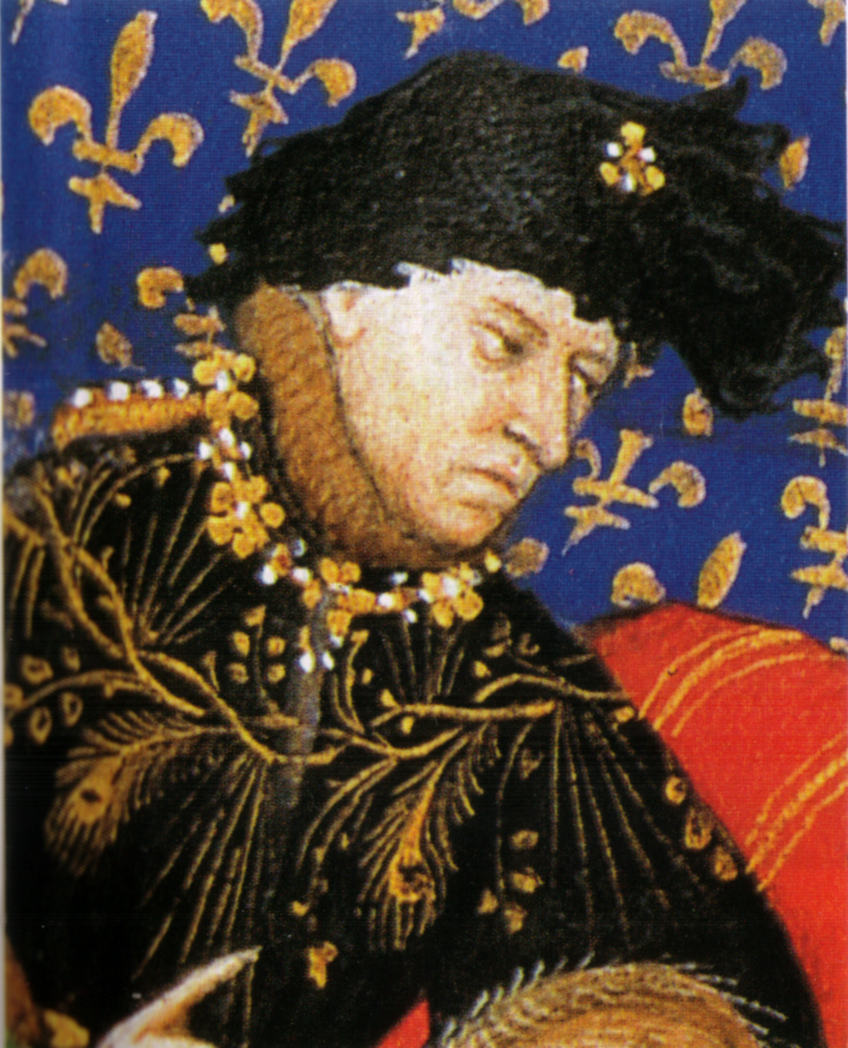
Charles VI by the painter known as the Master of Boucicaut (1412)

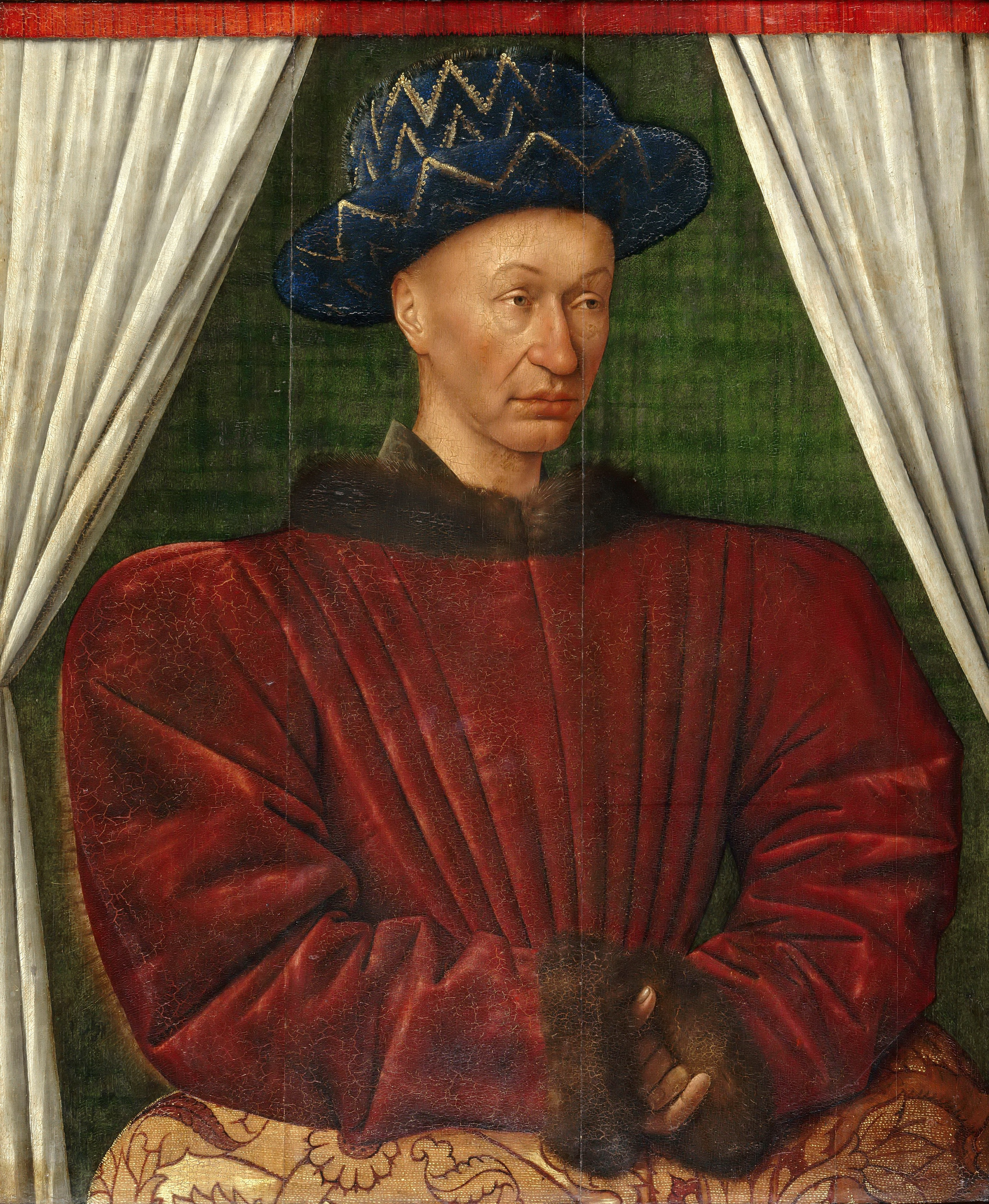
Portrait of Charles VII by Jean Fouquet, Louvre Museum, Paris, c. 1445–1450

The text, whose title dates from the 17th century, is a chronicle of the reigns of Charles VI and Charles VII. It is presented in the form of short sections, each relating to particular events over a period extending from 1405 to 1449. The author's account is strictly personal — he describes what he saw and heard. He had pretensions "neither to artistic merit (despite his occasional metaphors and flights into allegory) nor to historical accuracy and objectivity."

The book covers the political and religious events that animated Paris during the first half of the fifteenth century. Notably, it contains valuable information on the Armagnac–Burgundian Civil War, the siege of Meaux by Henry V of England and the economic consequences of the war against the English and the trial of Joan of Arc. Finally, it provides a wealth of information on daily life at the time, including: food and wine prices, religious processions, weather, deaths from epidemics, the level of the Seine, attacks by wolves in the city, and the suffering caused by the numerous domestic and international armed conflicts.

Territory controlled in 1429 by England, her Burgundian allies, and by forces loyal to Charles VII

The text of the Journal shows clearly that, for many years, the author was a fierce partisan of the Burgundy faction in the Armagnac-Burgundian civil war, the conflict that dominated most aspects of life in Paris and in France more generally. The war pitted two branches of the French royal family against one another – the House of Orléans (Armagnac faction) and the House of Burgundy (Burgundian faction) from 1407 to 1435. This civil war is closely linked to the Hundred Years’ War because the Burgundians formed an alliance with the English. The author's pro-Burgundian views were aligned with those of Paris's commoners and with the academics at the University, who hoped that the Burgundians would be able to rein in the excesses of the French monarchy, including in fiscal and monetary matters. By 1423, however, he becomes disillusioned with the Burgundians and their English allies (noting, for example, that they caused nearly as much suffering in the countryside as the Armagnacs) and, by the end of the Journal, he accepts the legitimacy of Charles VII as the French king.

== Sources ==
The author relied on multiple sources. First and foremost, he was an eye witness to much of it. Second, he reports on rumours and public opinion concerning these events, as well as on official news and decrees communicated in both written and oral forms.

Despite the title’s use of the word ‘Journal’ (or diary) the text is not structured as a diary in the sense of a book with daily entries, each reporting on subject matter gathered on that day. Instead, it is clear that the author reported on events using information that he could only have obtained well after the event took place (for example, he reports in May 1431 that Henry VI would be coming to Paris in December, though he could not have known this until later in the year). Thus, the text has more the character of a memoir than a diary or journal.

== Versions of the text ==
Six manuscripts of the Journal exist and numerous editions have been published. The 6 manuscripts consist of two copies made in the fifteenth century and four that are made much later:

- The oldest version, known as the Roman manuscript, is a copy dating from the end of the 15th century, which is preserved today in the collections of the Vatican. This is not a very careful copy — has no paragraphs and the binding places the year 1408 before 1405. The year 1438 is damaged and illegible.
- Another fifteenth-century copy is in Oxford, but the text has entire sections cut out. It is, in fact a collection of excerpts from the Journal that have been chosen to shed a flattering light on English exploits during the war in France.
- Other manuscripts exist dating from the end of the sixteenth century or the first half of the seventeenth century. They repeat the text of the Vatican copy and sometimes even provide additional details. This is particularly the case with the manuscript from Aix-en-Provence and the copy in the collection of the National Library of France in Paris, which allow the year 1438 (missing from the Vatican's copy) to be reconstituted.

None of the extant manuscripts are the original. A comparison of the copies reveals transcription errors and omissions. The various versions are complementary in the sense that, by considering them as a whole, it is possible to reconstitute the original Journal.

The first publications of the manuscript — that of Étienne Pasquier in 1596 and Denys Godefroy in 1653 — are partial, containing only excerpts. The first complete edition is that of La Barre in 1729. It occupies the first 208 pages of La Barre's collection of historical documents entitled Memoirs to serve the history of France and Burgundy. Alexandre Tuetey's 1881 edition, along with its extensive introduction, are still used today. Colette Beaune has edited a more accessible version with updated spelling, a detailed annotations and a glossary and Janet Shirley has translated the Journal into modern English.

== Identity of the author ==
The author is unknown because the original manuscript was lost, as was the prologue of the text where he might have identified himself.

All historians and scholars who have analysed the text, however, agree broadly on his milieu and profile. Based on clues provided in the text of the Journal, he was almost certainly a man of the cloth. He may have held an academic position at the University of Paris and it is likely that he was a doctor of theology. Given his detailed knowledge of parishes on the right bank of the Seine, it is reasonable to conclude that he had a pastoral role in one or more of these.

Some historians have sought to pinpoint an exact identity for the author, but none have provided a universally accepted answer. Auguste Longnon proposed Jean Beaurigout, parish priest of the Saint-Nicolas-des-Champs church. This thesis was rejected by Alexandre Tuetey, in his prologue to his 1881 edition, who attributes authorship to the canon of Notre-Dame de Paris, Jean Chuffart. Born in Tournai in Picardy, Chuffart first sided with the Anglo-Bourguignons before joining the camp of Charles VII on his return to Paris. This identification was rejected in turn by Colette Beaune in her introduction to the 1990 edition, where she notes that he was too often absent from Paris to be the author (based on the article devoted to Chuffart in the fourth volume of the Chartularium universitatis parisiensis by Denifle). A review of the 1968 Clarendon Press translation of the Vatican and Aix manuscripts into English describes the translator’s explanatory section on the identity of the author as « somewhat unprofitable speculation. » At the present time, the determination of the exact identity of the author cannot, it would seem, be unequivocally determined.
