= Maurice Agulhon =

French historian (1926–2014)

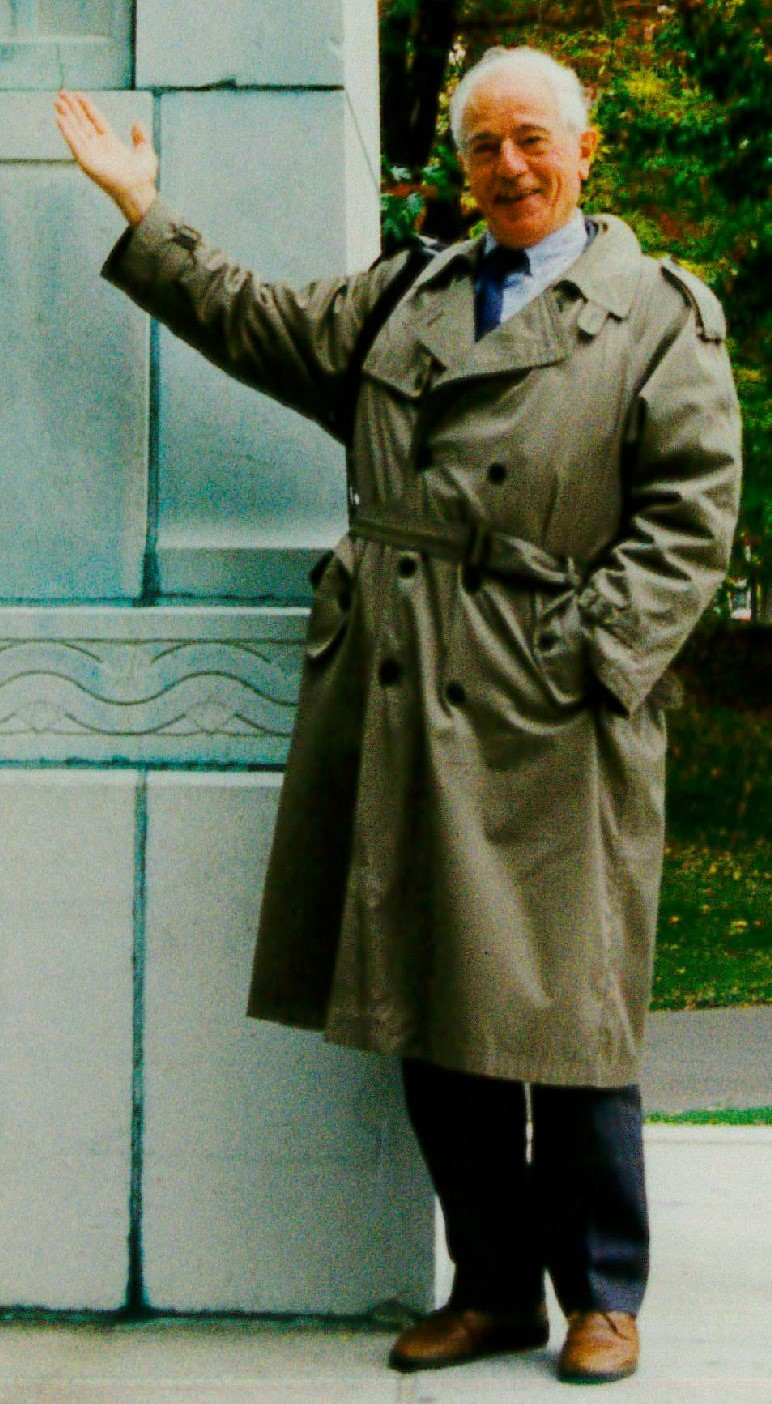
- Born: Maurice Louis Étienne Agulhon; 20 December 1926; Uzès
- Died: 28 May 2014; Brignoles
- Education: École normale supérieure, lycée du Parc, University of Paris, Lycée Mistral
- Occupation: Historian
- Employers: Lycée Thiers (1952–1954); Collège de France (1986–1997); French National Centre for Scientific Research (1954–1957); Paris 1 Panthéon-Sorbonne University (1972–1986); University of Provence (1957–1972)
- Known for: French history of 19th and 20th centuries
- Political party: French Communist Party
- Awards: Officer of the Legion of Honor (1989); Officier of the Ordre des Arts et des Lettres (1995); Officer of the French Order of Academic Palms (1994); Grand Prix Gobert (1991); Officier of the Ordre des Arts et des Lettres (1995); Chevalier of the Legion of Honour (1989); Officer of the Legion of Honor (1998)

Maurice Agulhon (20 December 1926 – 28 May 2014) was a French historian, specializing in the contemporary history of France of the 19th and 20th centuries, and professor at the Collège de France from 1986 to 1997. Although his early work focused on the Révolution of 1848 in Provence, Maurice Agulhon went on to become one of the leading specialists on the institutions of the French Republic and the symbolism of republican power. He was also politically committed to the left, initially with the French Communist Party.
