= Auguste Trognon =

French historian and translator

- Born: 27 September 1795; Paris
- Died: 27 December 1873 (aged 78); 18th arrondissement of Paris
- Occupation: historian
- Awards: Grand prix Gobert (1865)

Auguste Trognon (1795–1873) was a French historian and translator from Italian, Latin, and ancient Greek. He wrote a 5-volume Histoire de France (History of France), which won the grand prix Gobert in 1865 upon the nomination of François Guizot.

== Biography ==
Born in Paris in 1795, he was one of the sons of Jean Marie Trognon (ca. 1771–1844), employed at the Ministry of Finance. Auguste Trognon was a brother of Alphonse Trognon (1798–1854), who became a translator and classicist, and a brother of Victor Amédée Trognon (1805–1851), who became an artillery captain.

After graduation from the Lycée Napoléon and the École normale supérieure in Paris (class of 1813), Auguste Trognon became a professor of rhetoric at the lycée de Langres before becoming a history teacher at the Lycée Louis-le-Grand. In 1822, François Guizot chose him as a replacement in Guizot's chair of modern history at the Faculté des lettres de Paris at the Sorbonne.

In 1825, Trognon became the tutor of François d'Orléans, Prince of Joinville, son of the future Louis-Philippe I. After his tutelage of the Prince of Joinville was complete, Trognon remained attached to his former student, accompanied the naval squadron in the prince's 1844 campaign under the French Admiral Claude Hernoux (1797–1861), and became secrétaire des commandements du prince (secretary in charge of paperwork connected with the prince's commands). For many years, Trognon was also the secretary and foreign-language assistant of Marie-Amélie, queen of France, and, at the request of her sons, wrote a biography Vie de Marie-Amélie, reine des Français (Paris, 1871).

Editor of the literary journal Le Globe, Auguste Trognon was also the author of historical novels and translations of works by Heliodorus of Emesa (Histoire éthiopique from Aethiopica), by Theodore Prodromos (Amours de Rhodanthè et de Dosiclès), and by the Italian writers Ugo Foscolo (Dernières Lettres de Jacopo Ortis), Alessandro Manzoni, and Silvio Pellico. Auguste Trognon and his brother Alphonse collaborated on translations of the dramas of Vittorio Alfieri and the history of Alexander the Great written in Latin by Quintus Curtius Rufus.

== Selected publications ==
- Heliodorus, of Emesa (1822). Histoire éthiopique d'Héliodore. Paris: A. Corréard. LCCN 41034547.
- Histoire admirable du Franc Harderad et de la Vierge Aurélia. Paris: Brière. 1825.
- Trognon, Auguste (1825). Résumé de l'histoire d'Italie.
- Trognon, Auguste (1825). Manuscrits de l'ancienne abbaye de saint Julien: à Brioude.
- Le livre des gestes du roi Childebert III. Paris: Brière. 1825.
- Trognon, Auguste (1836). Études sur l'histoire de France.
- Œuvres complètes de Quinte-Curce, avec la traduction française de la collection Panckoucke par MM. Auguste et Alphonse Trognon. Paris: Garnier frères. 1861. Library of Congress catalog entry
- Histoire de France, 5 volumes, Louis Hachette, Paris, 1863–1865.
- Vie de Marie-Amélie, reine des Français, Michel Lévy frères, Paris, 1871.
  - Trognon, Auguste (1872). Vie de Marie-Amélie: Reine des Français. (troisième édition)
