= Théophile-Sébastien Lavallée =

French historian and geographer (1804-1867)

Théophile Sébastien Lavallée
- Born: 13 October 1804; Paris
- Died: 27 August 1867 (aged 62); Versailles, Yvelines
- Occupation: historian
- Awards: Grand prix Gobert (1866); Officier de la Legion d'honneur

Théophile Sébastien Lavallée (13 October 1804 – 27 August 1867) was a French historian and geographer.

== Biography ==
Appointed in 1826, as a mathematics tutor, at l'École spéciale militaire de Saint-Cyr, Lavallée successively became a history tutor and professor of geography and statistics applied to military science.

Pierre-Jules Hetzel, associated with Jean-Baptiste-Alexandre Paulin, published Lavallée's Histoire des Français in 1838. Subsequently, Lavallée continued his collaboration with Hetzel, notably for the 1845 book Le Diable à Paris (The Devil in Paris) by writing a history of Paris for a long preface to Le Diable à Paris. He contributed a long preface on the geography of France to a book written by Jules Verne and published by Hetzel.

In 1854 Lavallée began to publish Madame de Maintenon's works, supplemented with his commentaries and notes.

He married Louise Françoise Hortense Ferlin.

He also completely revised the Précis de la géographie universelle ou Description de toutes les parties du monde (Summary of universal geography or description of all parts of the world) by Malte-Brun.

His funeral took place on August 30, 1867, at the Versailles cemetery.

== Selected publications ==
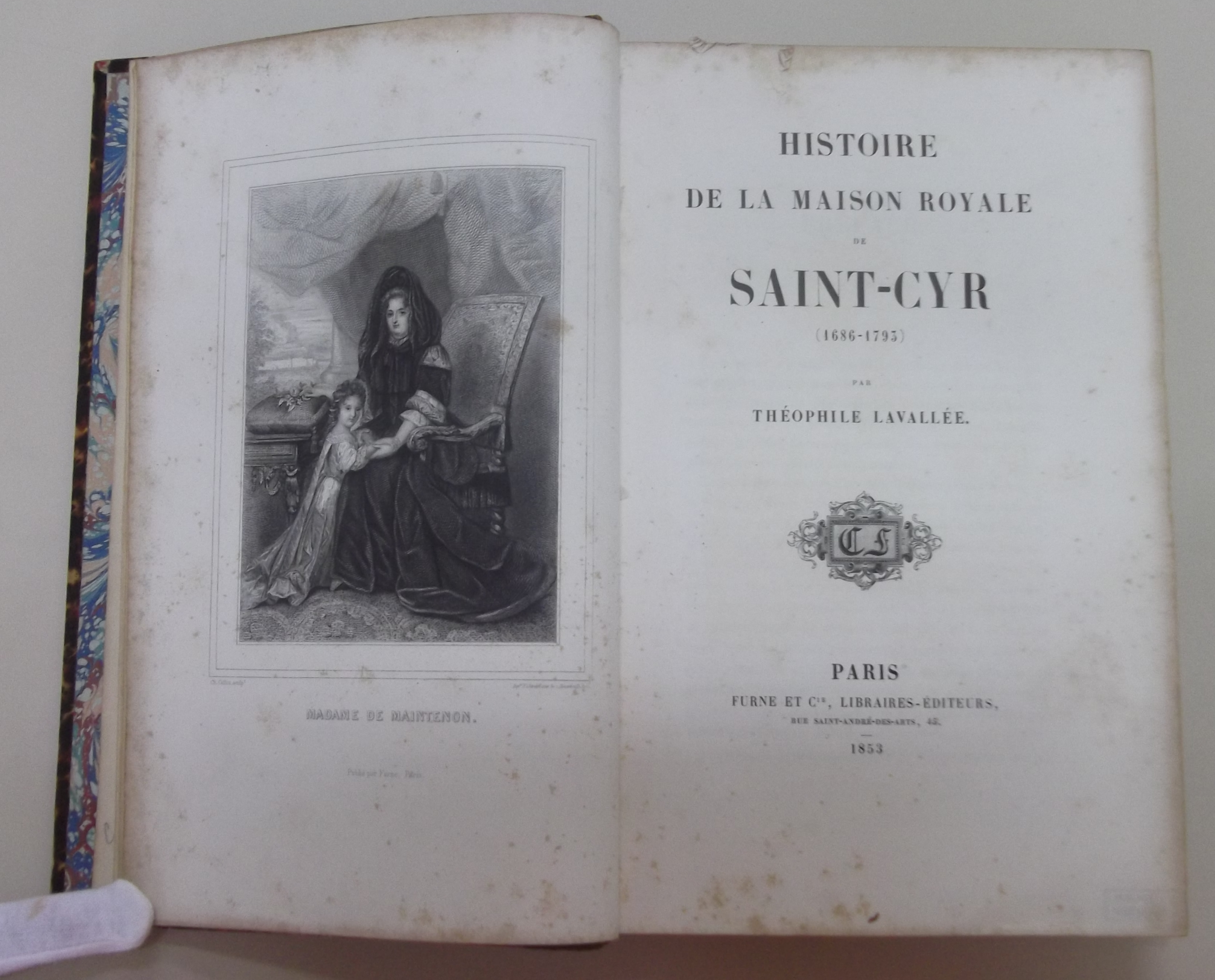
Lavallée, Théophile. Histoire de la Maison Royale de Saint-Cyr : 1686–1793. Paris : Furne, 1853.

- Jean-Sans-Peur, scènes historiques, Paris, 1829–1830
  - Lavallée, Théophile (1861). Jean Sans-Peur, duc de Bourgogne: Scènes historiques, 1407-19.
- Géographie physique, historique et militaire, Paris, 1836
  - Lavallée, Théophile Sébastien (1850). The Military Topography of Continental Europe. Translated by Julian R. Jackson.
  - Lavallée, Théophile (1868). Physical, Historical and Military Geography. Translated by Auguste Frédéric Lendy.
- Histoire de Paris depuis le temps des Gaulois jusqu’à nos jours, Édition en ligne de la partie II, Histoire des Quartiers de Paris, project Gutenberg
- Histoire des Français depuis le temps des Gaulois jusqu'en 1830, Paris, 1838–1839
- Atlas de géographie militaire adopté par le Ministre de la guerre pour l'école impériale militaire de Saint-Cyr, accompagné de tableaux de statistique militaire, Paris, Furne et Cie, 1864 Édition en ligne de Google Books
- Lettres et entretiens sur l'éducation des filles par M. Th. Lavallée - Charpentier, Libraire-Éditeur, 1861, en 2 volumes in-12.
- Les frontières de la France, Paris, Furne et Cie, 1864
- Histoire de l'Empire ottoman, Paris, 1855 (See Ottoman Empire.)
