= Jean Delumeau =

French historian (1923–2020)

- Born: Jean Léon Marie Joseph André Delumeau; 18 June 1923; Nantes (France)
- Died: 13 January 2020 (aged 96); Brest (France)
- Alma mater: École normale supérieure; University of Paris Faculty of Humanities
- Occupation: Historian
- Employer: Lycée Chateaubriand (1950–1954); Collège de France (1975–1994); French National Centre for Scientific Research (1954–1955); Paris 1 Panthéon-Sorbonne University (1970–1975); Rennes 2 University (1955–1970); School for Advanced Studies in the Social Sciences (1975–1978); École française de Rome (1948–1950); École pratique des hautes études (1963–1978); lycée Alain-Fournier (1947–1948)
- Awards: Commander of the National Order of Merit (2007); Commander of the Legion of Honour (1999); Grand Prix Gobert (1968); Prix de la biographie du Point (2009); Monseigneur-Marcel award (1984); Commandeur des Arts et des Lettres (1994); Honorary doctor of the University of Liège (1992); honorary doctor of the University of Sherbrooke (1986); CNRS silver medal (1960); honorary doctorate of the University of Deusto (1996); Scriptures & Spiritualities Award (1986)
- Position held: member of the École française de Rome (1948–1950)

Jean Léon Marie Delumeau (18 June 1923 – 13 January 2020) was a French historian specializing in the history of the Catholic Church, and author of several books regarding the subject. He held the Chair of the History of Religious Mentalities (1975–1994) at the Collège de France (former emeritus professor) and was a member of the Académie des inscriptions et belles-lettres.

== Life and career ==
Jean Léon Marie Delumeau was born in Nantes on 18 June 1923 and obtained his early education in several Catholic boarding schools. In 1943 he entered the École Normale Supérieure, and he later studied at the École Française de Rome, where Fernand Braudel was one of his mentors. He taught history at École Polytechnique, University of Rennes 2, and University of Paris 1 Pantheon-Sorbonne.

He was director of the Armorican Center for Historical Research (1964–1970), director of studies at the École pratique des hautes études (1963–1975) and at School for Advanced Studies in the Social Sciences (1975–1978), and professor emeritus at the Collège de France, where he occupied the chair of "History of Religious Mentalities in the Modern Western World" (1975–1994).

He was a member of the editorial board of several academic journals and a visiting professor at several universities in North America, Europe and Asia, and was also an honorary member of the Institut Universitaire de France and the Academia Europaea.

On 26 February 1988, Delumeau was elected a member of the Académie des Inscriptions et Belles-Lettres in the chair of Georges Dumézil. He was given his épée d'académicien on 27 September 1989 by Philippe Wolff. During the ceremony, speeches were made by Nicole Lemaître, Alain Cabantous, Michel Mollat du Jourdin, Wolff and himself. He was a candidate for the Académie française in 2002.

=== Later work, death, and legacy ===
On 26 April 2017, he was one of the signatories of a forum of researchers and academics announcing that their support for Emmanuel Macron in the first round of the 2017 French presidential election and calling to vote for him the second, in particular because of his commitment to higher education and research. Delumeau died on 13 January 2020 in Brest.

Delumeau has been described as "one of the most prominent representatives of the so-called history of mentalities" by Vingtième Siècle : Revue d'histoire, a French historical journal

== Awards and honors ==
Delumeau was an honorary member of the Observatoire du patrimoine religieux, a multi-faith association that works to preserve and promote French cultural heritage. He was also a member of the sponsorship committee of the Coordination pour l'éducation à la non-violence et à la paix.

He was made knight of the Legion of Honour on 28 Octobre 1978, promoted to officier on 31 December 1989, and to commander on 31 December 1999. He was made officer of the Ordre national du Mérite on 19 November 1995 and promoted to commander on 7 May 2007. He was also a commander of both the Ordre des Palmes académiques and the Ordre des Arts et des Lettres, the latter of which he was made on 24 November 1994.

Delumeau received honorary degrees from the University of Porto in 1984, the University of Sherbrooke in 1986, the University of Liège in 1992, the University of Deusto (1996), and the University of Bucharest in 2011.

He received the Grand prix Gobert for his book La civilisation de la Renaissance (1968), the 1975 Prix Thiers for his book Rome, the 1977 Prix Monseigneur Marcel for his book La civilisation de la Renaissance, and the 1980 Prix Montyon for his book Histoire vécue du peuple chrétien. He received the 1977 Grand prix catholique de littérature for his book Le Christianisme va-t-il mourir?.

== Bibliography ==
- Collective, Homo Religiosus. Autour de Jean Delumeau, Paris, Fayard, 1997..
- Collective, Le fait religieux, édité par Jean Delumeau, Fayard, Paris, 2014, 782 p., ISBN 9782213675237, front cover Google Books : ..
- Delumeau, Jean (1977). Catholicism between Luther and Voltaire. London: Burns & Oates.
- Delumeau, Jean (1990). Sin and Fear: The Emergence of a Western Guilt Culture, 13th–18th Centuries. New York: St. Martin’s Press.
- Thomas Worcester (2010). "Jean Delumeau (1923-)". In Daileader, Philip; Whalen, Philip (eds.). French Historians, 1900-2000: New Historical Writing in Twentieth-Century France. John Wiley & Sons Ltd. ISBN 978-1-4051-9867-7.
