= Charles-Hippolyte Pouthas =

French historian (1886–1974)

- Born: 19 July 1886; Caen
- Died: 2 May 1974 (aged 87); Cherbourg
- Occupation: Historian

Charles-Hippolyte Pouthas (19 July 1886 – 2 May 1974) was a French historian specialist of political and religious history of contemporary France.

Pouthas was honorary headmaster of the lycée Malherbe de Caen. He was a professor of contemporary history at the lycée Janson-de-Sailly then at the University of Paris and director of the Revue d'histoire moderne et contemporaine.

His work on the Second Empire participated to a reassessment from the "black legend" spread by the Republican and liberal historiography of the last third of the nineteenth century, and introduced a more moderate reading of the regime.

Among his students were Louis Girard, who succeeded him in the Sorbonne, Louis Chevalier and Rene Remond.

With Jules Isaac and André Alba, he was the author of history textbooks on France.

His research notes are kept at the Archives nationales under the symbols AB/XIX/3754 to AB/XIX/3782.

== Publications ==
(see Complete list of publications)

- 1911: La Constituante et la classe ouvrière, Annales révolutionnaires
- 1911: Les Collèges de Caen au XVIIIe, Caen, L. Jouan
- 1918–1920 Les Élections de Guizot dans le Calvados, Mémoires de l'Académie nationale des sciences, arts et belles-lettres de Caen
- 1923: Essai critique sur les sources et la bibliographie de Guizot pendant la Restauration
- 1923: Guizot pendant la Restauration, : préparation de l'homme d'État (1814–1830)
- 1934: Une famille de bourgeoisie française de Louis XIV à Napoléon
- 1936: La Jeunesse de Guizot : 1787-1814
- 1943: L'Église et les questions religieuses sous la Monarchie constitutionnelle 1814–1848, Centre de Documentation Universitaire
- 1943: L'Église et les questions Religieuses depuis 1848, Centre de Documentation Universitaire
- 1945: L'Église catholique de l'avènement de Pie VII à l'avènement de Pie IX
- 1946: Le Mouvement des nationalités en Europe dans la première moitié du XIXe
- 1948: Histoire de l'Égypte
- 1948: Démocraties et capitalisme (1848–1860)
- 1952: La Révolution de 1848 en France et la Seconde république
- 1952: Le Pontificat de Pie IX
- 1953: Documents diplomatiques du Gouvernement provisoire et de la Commission du pouvoir exécutif...
- 1956: La Population française pendant la première moitié du XIX, Institut national d'études démographique, cahier n° 25, Paris, Presses universitaires de France
- 1956: Histoire politique du Second Empire
- 1956: L'Europe occidentale de 1815 à 1848
