= Pierre Adolphe Chéruel =

French historian (1809–1891)

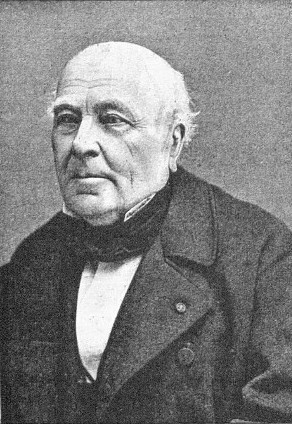
- Born: January 17, 1809; Rouen, France
- Died: May 1, 1891 (aged 82); Paris, France

Academic background
- Education: École Normale Supérieure

Academic work
- Notable works: Histoire de Rouen sous la domination anglaise au XV^{e} siècle Histoire de Rouen pendant l'époque communale, 1550–1382

Pierre Adolphe Chéruel (January 17, 1809 – May 1, 1891) was a French historian.

Chéruel was born at Rouen and educated at the École Normale Supérieure, becoming a fellow (agregé) in 1830. His early studies were concerned with local history. His Histoire de Rouen sous la domination anglaise au XV^{e} siècle (1840) and Histoire de Rouen pendant l'époque communale, 1550–1382 (Rouen, 1843–1844), are major productions for a time when the archives were neither catalogued nor classified, and contain useful documents previously unpublished. His theses for the degree of doctor, De l'administration de Louis XIV d'après les Mémoires inédits d'Olivier d'Ormesson and De Maria Stuarta et Henrico III (1849), led him to the study of general history. The former was expanded afterwards under the title Histoire de l'administration monarchique en France depuis l'avènement de Philippe-Auguste jusqu'à la mort de Louis XIV (1855), and in 1855 he also published his Dictionnaire historique des institutions, mœurs et coutumes de la France, of which many editions have appeared.

These works may still be consulted for the 17th century, the period upon which Chéruel concentrated all his scientific activity. He edited successively the Journal d'Olivier Lefèvre d'Ormesson (1860–1862), interesting for the history of the parlement of Paris during the minority of King Louis XIV; Lettres du cardinal Mazarin pendant son ministère (9 vols, 1870–1891), continued by the vicomte Georges d'Avenel; and Mémoires du duc de Saint-Simon, published for the first time according to the original manuscripts (2 editions, 1856–1858 and 1878–1881).

To Saint-Simon he devoted two critical studies, which are acute but not definitive: Saint-Simon considéré comme historien de Louis XIV (1865) and Notice sur la vie et sur les mémoires du duc de Saint-Simon (1876). The latter may be considered as an introduction to the famous Mémoires. Among his later writings were the Histoire de la France pendant la minorité de Louis XIV (4 volumes, 1880) and Histoire de la France sous le ministère de Mazarin (1882–1883). These two works are valuable for abundance of facts, precision of details, and clear and intelligent arrangement, but are characterized by a slightly frigid style. In their compilation Chéruel used a fair number of unpublished documents. To the student of the second half of the 17th century in France, the works of Chéruel are a mine of information.
