= Julian Jackson (geographer) =

British geographer (1790–1853)

Julian Jackson (1790–1853) was a British geographer and colonel of the Imperial Russian staff.

== Life ==
The son of William Turner Jackson and his wife Lucille, he was born 30 March 1790, and baptised at St. Anne's Church, Westminster on 24 May that year. He passed through the Royal Military Academy, Woolwich, was nominated to a Bengal cadetship by Sir Stephen Lushington in 1807, and was appointed second lieutenant in the Bengal Artillery 26 September 1808, and first lieutenant 28 April 1809.

Jackson resigned his rank in India 28 August 1813 to seek employment in the Duke of Wellington's army, but arrived too late. On 2 June 1815 the emperor Alexander I of Russia appointed him to the quartermaster's staff of the imperial suite, with the rank of lieutenant. He did duty with the quartermaster-general's staff of the 12th Russian infantry division under Count Mikhail Semyonovich Vorontsov, forming part of the allied army of occupation in France, until 6 November 1818, when he went to Russia with them in the rank of staff-captain.

On the expansion of the Lithuanian army corps in 1819, Jackson was appointed to the quartermaster-general's staff, and attached to the grenadier brigade. He did duty with this part of the army during most of his service, becoming captain 8 August 1821, and lieutenant-colonel 29 March 1825. He was promoted colonel on the general staff of the army 14 August 1829, and retired from the Russian service 21 September 1830.

On Jackson's retirement Georg von Cancrin, Imperial finance minister, appointed him commissioner and correspondent in London for the Russian department of manufactures. Early in 1841 he was appointed secretary of the Royal Geographical Society of London. He resigned the secretaryship in February 1847. About the same time he was suddenly superseded in his Russian post and was in financial difficulty; through Sir Roderick Murchison he obtained a clerkship under the council of education, which he held for life, and Nicholas I of Russia also gave him a small pension.

Jackson was made a Fellow of the Royal Society in 1845, and was a member or corresponding member of other learned societies. He was a knight of the Order of Saint Stanislaus. He died, after long illness, on 16 March 1853.

== Works ==
Jackson's Guide du Voyageur (Paris, 1822), went through several French editions, and was reproduced in English as What to Observe; or the Traveller's Remembrancer, from 1841. He also wrote a pamphlet on National Education, which went through two editions; a work on Minerals and their Uses (London, 1848); a memoir on Cartography; and numerous reviews.

Jackson contributed to the Bibliothèque universelle de Genève, from 1830 to 1832; and wrote for the Journal of the Royal Geographical Society. He translated and edited from the French Théophile-Sébastien Lavallée's treatise on Military Geography, which he revised heavily. He also indexed the first ten volumes of the Proceedings of the Royal Geographical Society.

== Family ==
Jackson married Sarah Ogle, by whom he had several children.

== Notes ==
Attribution

This article incorporates text from a publication now in the public domain: Lee, Sidney, ed. (1892). "Jackson, Julian". Dictionary of National Biography. Vol. 29. London: Smith, Elder & Co.
