= François Bluche =

French historian

François Bluche (17 September 1925 – 28 June 2018) was a French historian.

He painted a largely positive portrait of Louis XIV in his biography, attributing to him substantial cultural and political achievements. Bluche saw Louis as a precursor to enlightened despotism and argued that his reign witnessed the birth of modern France. In his view both Louis' creation of a centralised, powerful monarchy and his wars of conquest benefited the French people. The book was translated into English by Mark Greengrass and published in 1990. Peter Burke labelled Bluche a "neo-traditionalist" who had written a "moderate but firm apologia for Louis XIV, a reaction against what the author calls the 'black legend' of the reign".

During the 1960s he was arrested for suspected involvement in an assassination plot against President de Gaulle.

Bluche was awarded the Grand prix Gobert in 1961 for his book Les magistrats du Parlement de Paris au XVIIIe siècle, the Prix Feydeau de Brou for Les magistrats du Grand Conseil au XVIIIe siècle (1968), the Prix Broquette-Gonin (literature) for Le despotisme éclairé médaille (1970), the Prix Feydeau de Brou for La vie quotidienne de la noblesse française au XVIIIe siècle (1974) and the Prix d’Académie for the Dictionnaire du Grand Siècle médaille de vermeil in 1991.

== Works ==
- Marie-Josèphe de Saxe (Paris: Hachette, 1970).
- Louis XIV (Paris: Fayard, 1986). (ISBN 978-2717809886)
- L'Ancien régime. Institutions et société (Paris: Éditions de Fallois/Librairie générale française, 1993). (ISBN 2253064238)
- Louis XV (Paris: Perrin, 1999).
- Richelieu (Paris: Perrin, 2003). (ISBN 978-2-262-01718-7)
