= Paul Thureau-Dangin =

French historian (1837–1913)

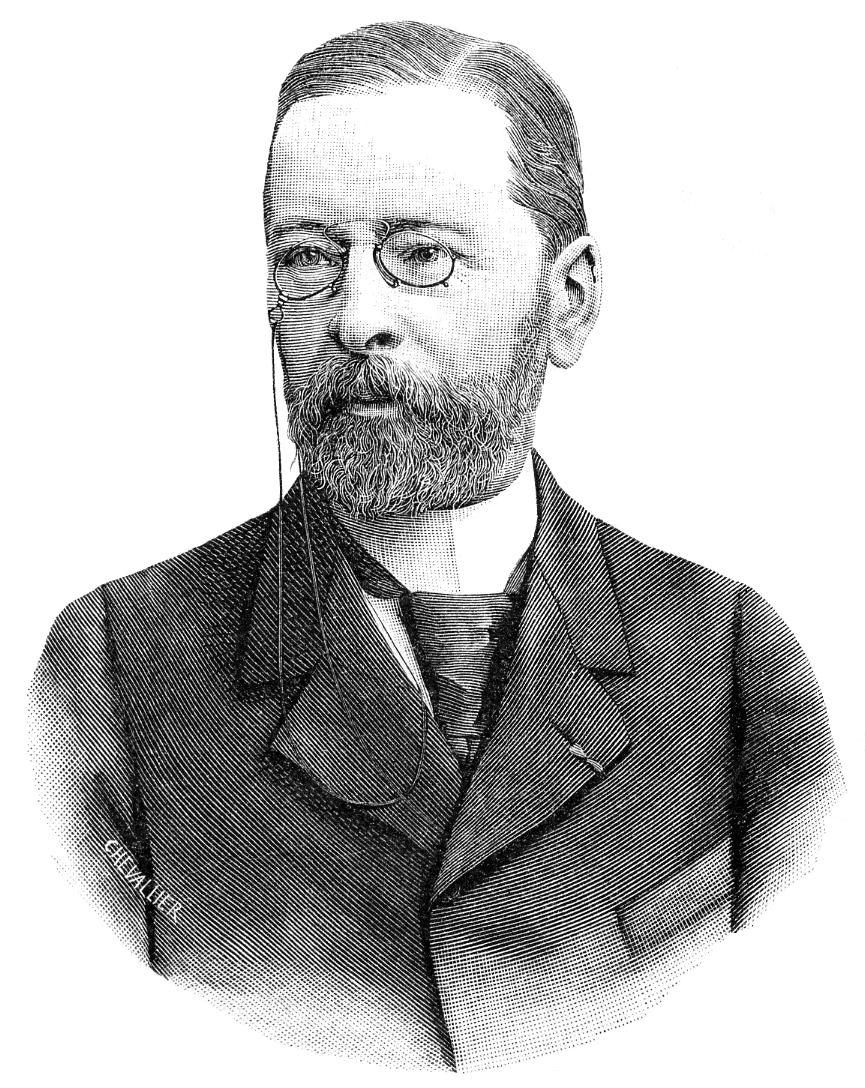
Paul Thureau-Dangin

Paul Thureau-Dangin (14 December 1837 – 24 February 1913), member of the Académie française (1893, later Perpetual Secretary), was a historian of the reign of Louis-Philippe and also of the revival of Catholic thought (in the Roman Catholic Church and the Church of England) in nineteenth century Britain.

Thureau-Dangin reconciled his liberal Catholic position with support for republican ideals.

He died in Paris on 24 February 1913.

== Works or publications ==
- Monarchie de juillet, 1984.

Revised and edited English translation of La renaissance catholique en Angleterre au XIXe siècle in two volumes.

- Thureau-Dangin, Paul (1914). Wilberforce, Wilfrid (ed.). The English Catholic revival in the nineteenth century (PDF). Vol. 1. London: Simpkin, Marshall, Hamilton, Kent. LCCN 15007035. OCLC 590116065. Archived from the original on 16 May 2007.
- Thureau-Dangin, Paul (1914). Wilberforce, Wilfrid (ed.). The English Catholic revival in the nineteenth century (PDF). Vol. 2. London: Simpkin, Marshall, Hamilton, Kent. LCCN 15007035. OCLC 590116065. Archived from the original on 16 May 2007.
