= Auguste Nompar de Caumont, 13th Duke of La Force =

French duke and historian

Auguste Nompar de Caumont, 13th Duke of La Force (Auguste Armand Ghislain Marie Joseph; 18 August 1878, Dieppe – 3 October 1961, Saint-Aubin-de-Locquenay), was a French duke and historian. Specialising in the 17th century (he was himself a descendant of the 1000-year-old Caumont de la Force family), his work allowed him to reconstruct events in which his ancestors had taken part. He was elected a member of the Académie française on 19 November 1925.

== Works ==
- Amours et usages de jadis, Paris, Fayard 1959
- Anne de Caumont-La Force, comtesse de Balbi, Paris, Émile-Paul, 1909
- Chateaubriand au travail, Avignon, Aubanel, 1941
- Claire Marie de Nassau : princesse de Ligne, Bruxelles, [s.n.], 1936
- Comédies sanglantes, drames intimes, Paris, Émile-Paul frères, 1930
- Dames d'autrefois, Paris, Émile-Paul frères, 1933
- De Bayard au Roi Soleil, Paris, La Table ronde 1946
- De Colbert à Marat, Paris, Éditions de la Table ronde 1946
- Deux favorites, Madame de Balbi et Madame de Polastron, Paris, Revue des deux mondes, 1907
- Dix siècles d'histoire de France; les Caumont la Force, Paris, Fasquelle 1960
- Églises et abbayes de la Sarthe, Paris, J. Delmas et Cie, 1971
- En marge de l'Académie, Paris, Wesmael-Charlier 1962
- En suivant nos pères, Paris, Amiot-Dumont 1952
- Femmes fortes, Paris, Émile-Paul frères 1936
- Histoire du cardinal de Richelieu , 4 tomes, Paris, Plon 1932-1947
- Histoire et portraits, Paris, Editions Emile-Paul frères, 1937
- Journal 1817-1848, Paris, Amiot-Dumont, 1955
- La fin de la douceur de vivre; souvenirs 1878-1914, Paris, Plon 1961
- La grande mademoiselle, Paris, Flammarion, 1927
- La vie amoureuse de la Grande Mademoiselle, Paris, Flammarion, 1931, 1927
- La vie courante hier et aujourd'hui : une fantaisie de Madame Du Barry, Paris, Bureaux de la Revue de France, 1932
- L'architrésorier Lebrun, gouverneur de la Hollande, 1810-1813, Paris, Plon, 1907
- Lauzun un courtisan du Grand Roi, Paris, Hachette, 1913
- Le beau passé .., Paris, La Table ronde 1946
- Le Duc de La Force, Paris, F. Alcan, 1931
- Le grand Conti, Paris, Émile-Paul frères, 1922.
- Le Maréchal de La Force, un serviteur de sept rois (1558-1652). [t.1-2], Paris, Émile-Paul frères, 1924-1928
- Les Caumont La Force; dix siècles d'histoire de France, Paris, Fasquelle 1960
- Les Châteaux de la Sarthe, Paris, Delmas 1960
- Les prisons du Bossu de la Fronde : Armand de Bourbon, prince de Conti, Paris, Revue des deux mondes, 1922
- Les reines de l'émigration, Paris, 1907-1908
- Louis XIV et sa cour, Paris, Productions de Paris, 1959
- Pierre de Nolhac, Paris, Beauchesne, 1938
