= Jean-Pierre Clément =

French political economist and historian

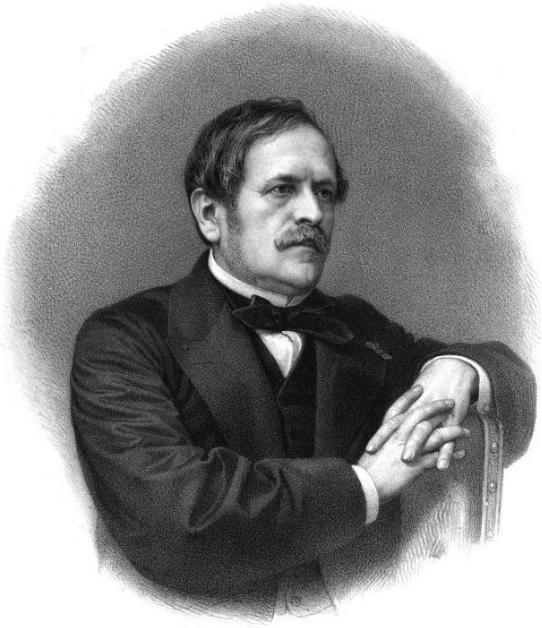
Jean-Pierre Clément

Jean-Pierre Clément (2 June 1809 – 8 November 1870; known as Pierre Clément) was a French political economist and historian, born at Draguignan. He was in the Ministry of Finance and a member of the Institute and wrote, with the aid of original documents, works on French financial administration, particularly in the epoch of Colbert, including:

- Histoire de la vie et de l'administration de Colbert (1846)
- Histoire du systéme protecteur en France depuis Colbert jusqu'à la révolution de 1848 (1854)
- Etudes financières et d'economie sociale (1859)
- Lettres, instructions, et Mémoires de Colbert (seven volumes, 1861–1882)

Clément's prefaces to the last work were collected and edited by his widow under the title Histoire de Colbert et de son administration (1874; third edition, 1892)

Clément was an early member of the Société d'économie politique organized by Pellegrino Rossi.
