= Pierre de Nolhac =

French historian, art historian and poet

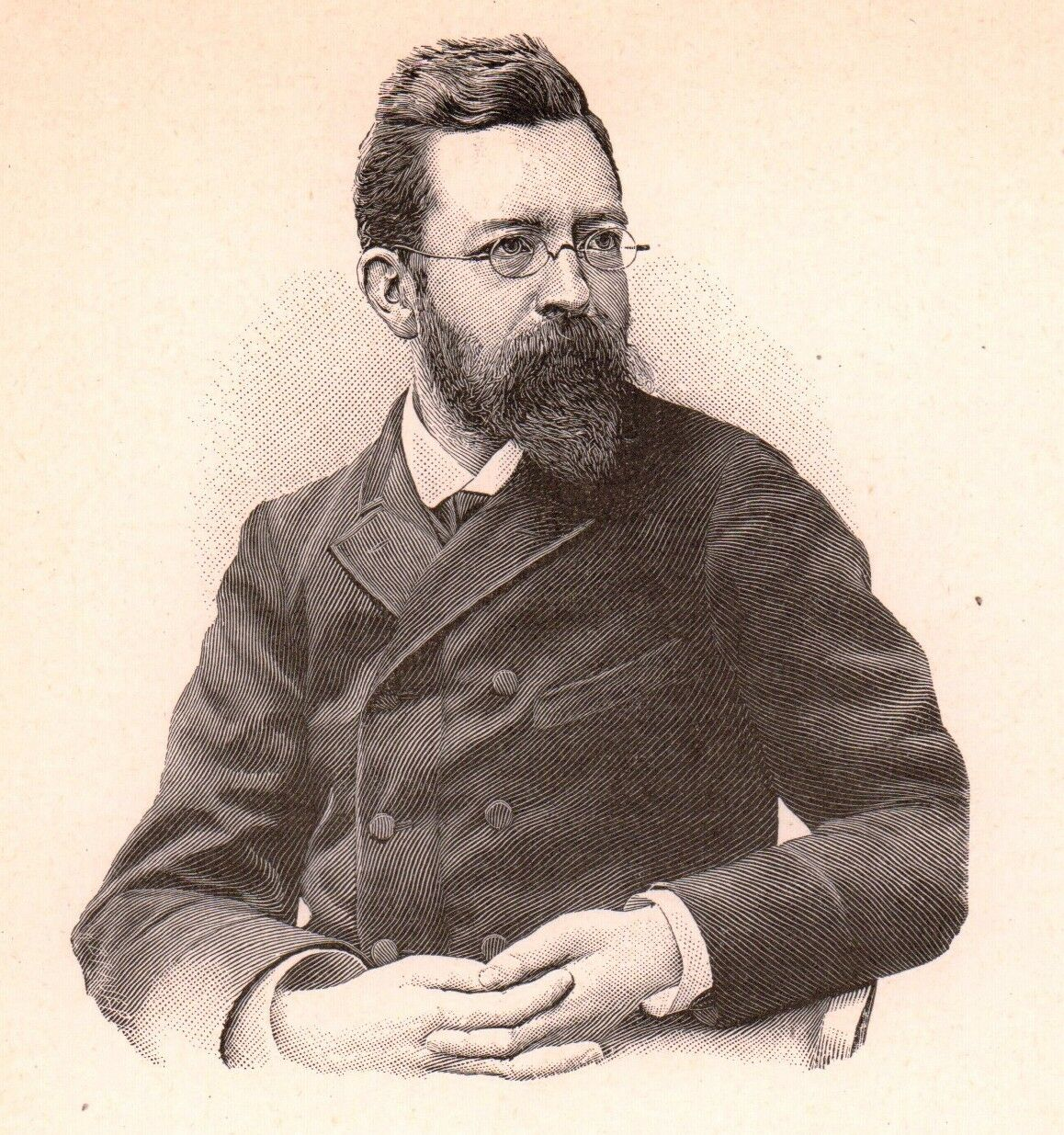
Pierre de Nolhac

Pierre Girault de Nolhac (15 December 1859, Ambert – 31 January 1936, Paris), known as Pierre de Nolhac, was a French historian, art historian and poet.

== Biography ==
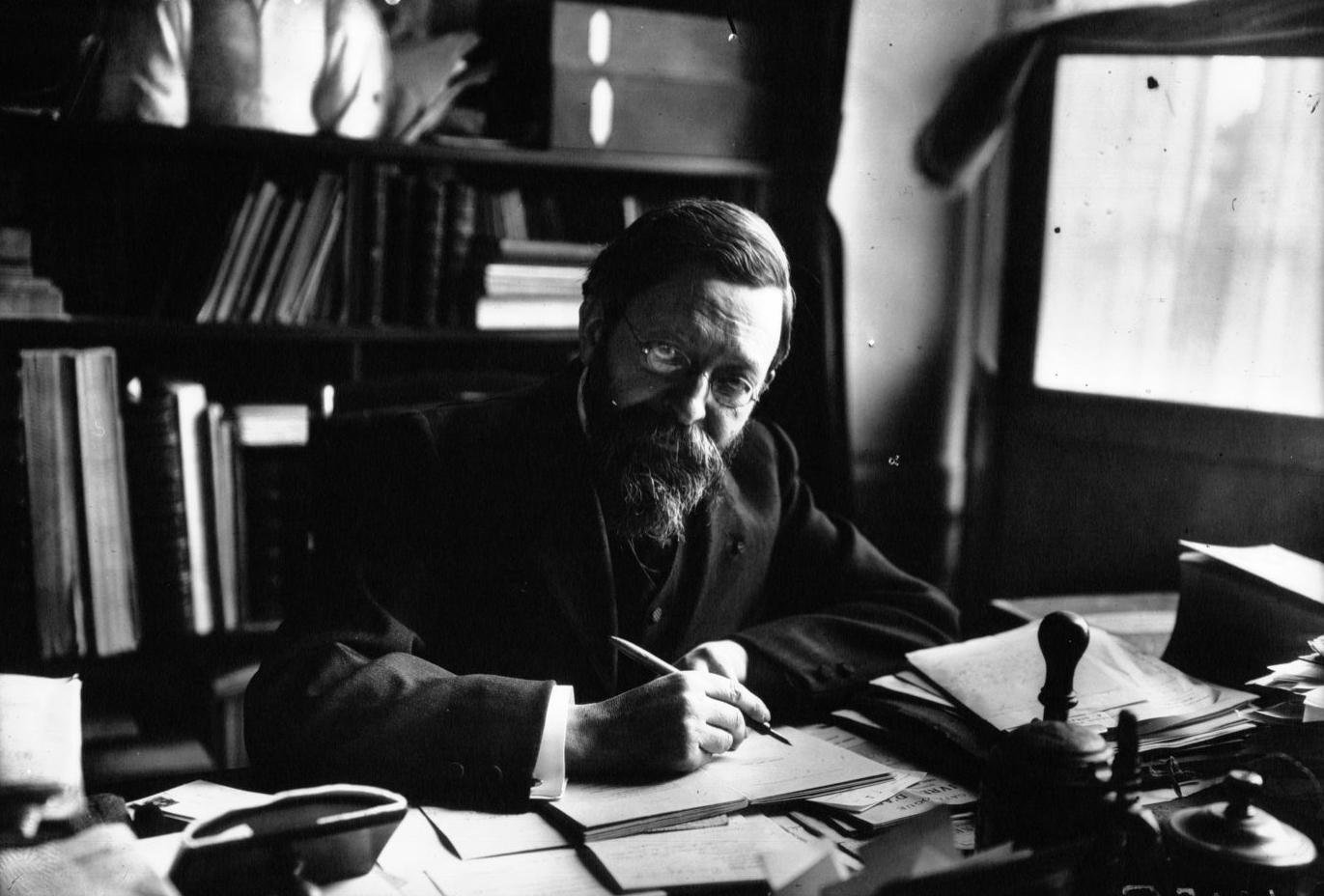
Pierre de Nolhac at his desk, 1911

After studying at Le Puy-en-Velay, in Rodez and Clermont-Ferrand, Pierre de Nolhac went to Paris in 1880 to undertake a literature degree at the Sorbonne and the École pratique des hautes études, where he later became director of studies. A member of the French School of Rome in 1882, he worked there on Italian humanism of the sixteenth century. In 1886, he was attached to the Museum in the Palace of Versailles and became curator in 1892, founding a chair of art history within the École du Louvre in 1910, then retiring to the Musée Jacquemart-André in 1920. He was elected a member of the Académie française in 1922.

His activities in the museum of Versailles were crucial, since they contributed greatly to modernisation and to restoring the collections, including the furniture, which had been dispersed during the French Revolution. He played a role in the preparations for the Treaty of Versailles, which took place in the Palace in June 1919.

Pierre de Nolhac left a substantial body of work largely devoted to history, especially to Renaissance humanism. During his stay at the French School of Rome (1882–1885), he discovered unpublished manuscripts of Petrarch in the Vatican library, and the discovery helped advance knowledge about his subject. His monograph on Fulvio Orsini is still authoritative. He also devoted several books to Queen Marie-Antoinette at Versailles. His work as a poet was recognised in his own time, notably by his friend, the Italian poet Gabriele d'Annunzio.

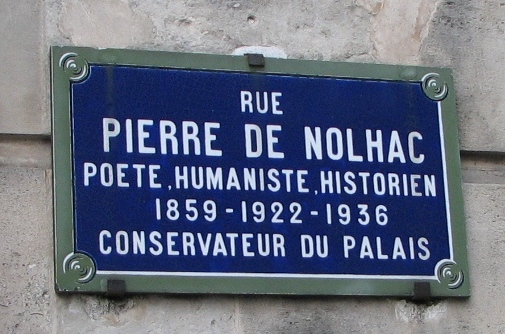
Pierre de Nolhac street sign in Versailles

The central library of Versailles has many manuscripts of major works by Pierre de Nolhac, including Erasmus and Italy, Queen Marie Antoinette, Nattier, Louis XV and Marie Leszczynska. Also available are the original of his 1924 acceptance speech to the Académie française and his very extensive correspondence with figures as diverse as Marcel Proust, Henri Bergson, Leconte de Lisle, Ernest Renan, Mussolini or Lyautey.

A postage stamp was issued bearing his image February 13, 1960.

A street in Versailles, near the castle between the Dufour Pavilion and the Grand Commun, bears his name.

He is the father of the painter Henri de Nolhac.

== Works ==
Versailles Triomphant
La France d'autrefois a laissé son image
Faite de pierre et d'eau, de marbres et de fleurs;
Versailles lui compose un livre de grandeurs
Où l'art de ses enfants l'exalte à chaque page.

Par lui sous notre ciel s’attestent d’âge en âge
Les grâces d’un génie où se prennent les cœurs;
La volonté d’un seul ordonna ces splendeurs
Et le pays entier se mire en son ouvrage.

Mais ces Français vaillants dont nous sommes les fils
Savaient entremêler les lauriers et les lis;
À cueillir la victoire ils excellaient naguère;

Et l’on voit, aux plafonds que Le Brun déroula
Du Salon de la Paix au Salon de la Guerre,
L’Allemagne trembler lorsque Turenne est là.

- Le Dernier Amour de Ronsard (1882)
- Lettres de Joachim Du Bellay publiées pour la première fois d'après les originaux (1883)
- Le Canzoniere autographe de Pétrarque (1886)
- La Bibliothèque de Fulvio Orsini (1887)
- Petites Notes sur l'art italien (1887)
- Erasme en Italie. Les études grecques de Pétrarque (1888)
- Les Correspondants d'Alde Manuce (1888)
- Matériaux nouveaux d'histoire littéraire (1483–1514) (1888)
- Le Château de Versailles au temps de Marie-Antoinette (1889)
- Piero Vettori et Carlo Sigonio, correspondance avec Fulvio Orsini (1889)
- La Reine Marie-Antoinette (1889)
- Les Consignes de Marie-Antoinette au Petit Trianon (1890)
- Le De viris illustribus de Pétrarque, notice sur les manuscrits originaux, suivie de fragments inédits (1890)
- Il viaggio in Italia di Enrico III, re di Francia, e le feste a Venezia, Ferrara, Mantova e Torin (1890)
- De Patrum et bledii Aevi scriptorum codicibus in Bibliotheca Petrarcae olim collectis, thesis (1892)
- Pétrarque et l'Humanisme, thèse (1892)
- Marie-Antoinette à Trianon (1893)
- Paysages de France et d'Italie (1894)
- Pietro Bembo et Lazare de Baïf (1894)
- Le Château de Versailles musée d'art décoratif (1896)
- La Dauphine Marie-Antoinette (1896)
- Le Musée de Versailles. Le Virgile du Vatican et ses peintures (1897)
- Le Premier Travail français sur Euripide : la traduction de François Tissard (1898)
- Le Château de Versailles sous Louis XV (1898)
- Les Dernières Constructions de Le Vau à Versailles (1899)
- Histoire du château de Versailles (1899–1900)
- L'Allée d'eau des jardins de Versailles (1900)
- Louis XV et Marie Leszczynska (1900)
- Trianon de porcelaine. La Création de Versailles (1901)
- Louis XV et Madame de Pompadour (1903)
- Poèmes de France et d’Italie (1904)
- Jean Marc Nattier (1905)
- Les Jardins de Versailles (1906)
- François Boucher (1907)
- Les Sonnets (1907)
- Jean-Honoré Fragonard (1910)
- Versailles sous Louis XIV (1911)
- Versailles au XVIIIe siècle (1918)
- Vers pour la Patrie (1920)
- Ronsard et l'Humanisme (1921)
- Souvenirs d'un vieux Romain (1922)(1930)
- Un poète rhénan ami de la Pléiade : Paul Melissu (1923)
- Études sur la Cour de France (1924)
- Le Trianon de Marie-Antoinette (1924)
- Pierre de Ronsard (1924)
- Pascal en Auvergne (1925)
- Versailles inconnu (1925)
- Le Testament d'un Latin (1928)
- L'Art de la miniature chez Pétrarque (1928)
- Autour de la Reine (1929)
- La Vie et l’œuvre de Maurice Quentin de Latour (1930)
- Pages auvergnates (1931)
- L'Art à Versailles (1931)
- Contes philosophiques (1932)
- Laus Florentiae, con la versione italiana di Adolfo Mabellini (1932)
- Le Rameau d'or (1933)
- Louis XV à Versailles (c1934)

La Duchesse de la Valliere after Mignard

== Other works ==
- Saint-André, Claude, A king's favourite: Madame du Barry and her times from hitherto unpublished documents London, Herbert Jenkins, 1915. Introduction by Pierre de Nolhac.

== Bibliography ==
- Pierre de Nolhac, La Résurrection de Versailles, Souvenirs d'un conservateur, 1887-1920 (Plon, 1937); reissue presented and annotated by Christophe Pincemaille, coll. La Société des Amis de Versailles (Paris, Perrin, 2002, p. 251)
- Franck Ferrand, Ils ont sauvé Versailles (Perrin, 2004)
- Claire Salvy, Pierre de Nolhac 1859-1936 (Les Editions du Roure, 2009) ISBN 2-906278-85-8
