= Camille Rousset =

French historian (1821–1892)

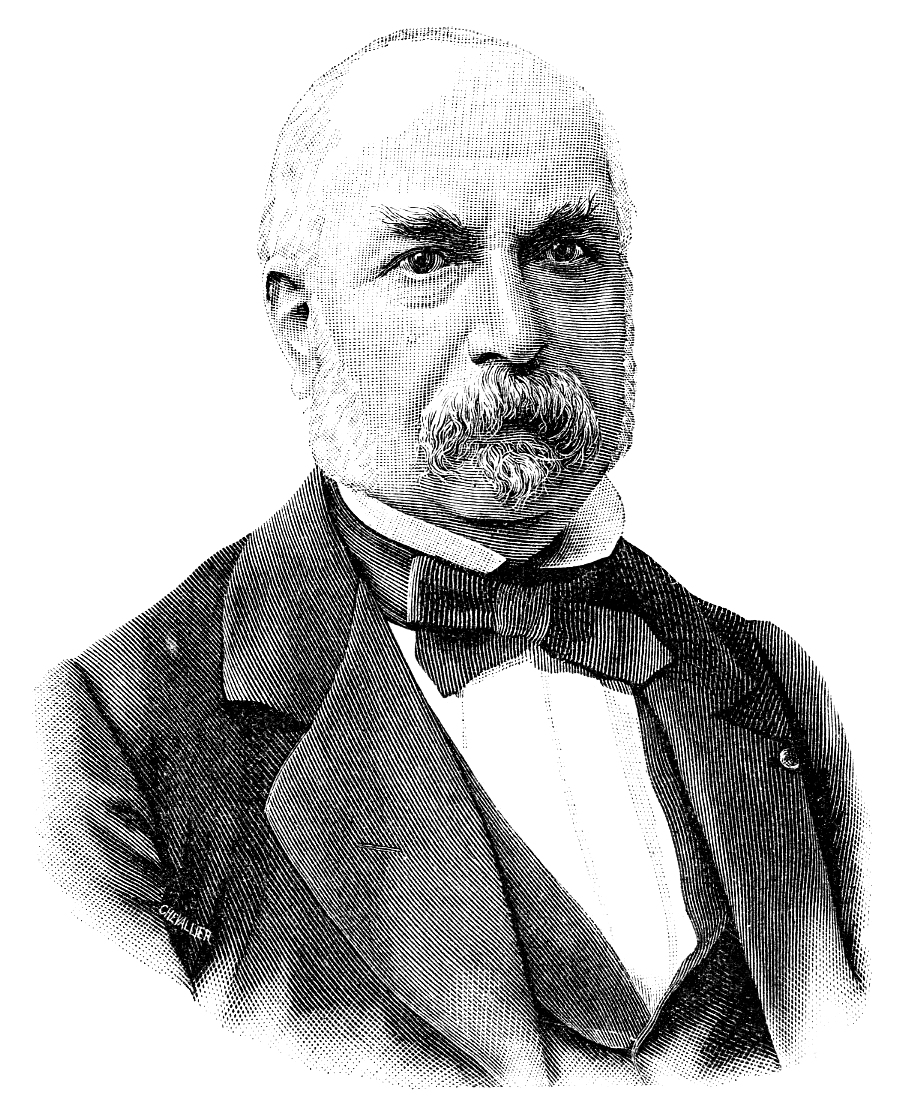
Camille Rousset (Le Magasin pittoresque, 1894, after a photograph by Pirou)

Camille Félix Michel Rousset (15 February 1821, Paris – 19 February 1892, Saint-Gobain) was a French historian. He taught at Grenoble before becoming a historian to the Ministry of War. He was elected to the Académie française in 1871.

== Bibliography ==
- Précis d'histoire de la Révolution et de l'Empire (1849)
- Histoire de Louvois (4 vol.) (1861–63)
- Correspondance de Louis XV et du maréchal de Noailles (2 vol.) (1865)
- Le Comte de Gisors (1868)
- Les Volontaires de 1791-1794 (1870)
- La Grande Armée de 1813 (1871)
- Histoire de la guerre de Crimée (1877)
- La Conquête d'Alger (1879)
- Un ministre de la Restauration : le marquis de Clermont-Tonnerre (1883)
- L'Algérie de 1830 à 1840 (2 vol.) (1887)
- La conquête de l'Algérie, 1841 à 1857 (2 vol.) (1889)
