= Camille Dareste =

French zoologist and embryologist

- Born: 23 November 1822; Paris, France
- Died: 10 January 1899 (aged 76); Paris, France
- Citizenship: France
- Scientific career
- Fields: Zoology, embriology
- Thesis: Recherches sur la classification des poissons de l'ordre des Plectognathes (1850)

Gabriel-Madeleine-Camille Dareste de la Chavanne (23 November 1822, in Paris – 10 January 1899, in Paris) was a French zoologist and specialist in experimental embryology particularly in the examination of natural defects as well as the artificial induction of developmental defects, part of a field then termed as a teratology.

== Life and work ==
Dareste was born in Paris in a family of Italian origins, and was the brother of Antoine and Rodolphe Dareste de la Chavanne. He became a student of Etienne Saint Hilaire and obtained his doctorate in medicine in 1847 and his doctorate in science in 1851. He worked at the University of Lille, where he was chair, successor to Henri de Lacaze-Duthiers, at the faculty of natural history from 1864 to 1872. In 1872 he was appointed professor of ichthyology and herpetology at the Museum d'Histoire Naturelle in Paris. He was named director of the laboratory of teratology, and from 1875, associated with the École des Hautes-études. He was awarded the grand prize in physiology by the Académie des sciences for the treatise Recherches sur la production artificielle de monstruosités (1876). He examined spina bifida in human embryos and noted that they were caused by a failed neural tube closure in embryonic development. He discovered that the more serious abnormalities were induced by disruptions at an earlier developmental stages. Based on his experiments he proposed five principles of teratology in the 1891 edition of his book.

Following the work of Etienne and Geoffroy Saint-Hilaire, he became a founder of teratogeny, it being defined as the experimental study of conditions for the artificial production of monstrosities. Beginning in 1855, he purposely produced monstrous chick embryos by using "indirect methods" that exposed the egg to teratogenic factors — such as, implementing lowered or increased incubation temperatures for several hours. He had Charles d'Almeida construct a thermo-electric thermometer for his experimental use. Dareste quoted Francis Bacon and stated that "He who will know the paths of nature will observe more easily their deviations; on the other hand, he who will know the deviations will describe more precisely the paths."

== Works ==
- Troisième mémoire sur les circonvolutions du cerveau chez les mammifères (1855) – Third memoire on convolutions of the brain in mammals.
- Note sur un nouveau genre de monstruosité double appartenant à la famille des polygnathiens (1859) – Note on a new kind of dual monstrosity belonging to the family of polygnathians
- Recherches sur la production artificielle des monstruosités, ou, Essais de Tératogénie expérimentale (1876) – Research on the artificial production of monstrosities, or essays on experimental teratogeny.
