= Arthur Chuquet =

French historian and biographer (1853–1925)

Arthur Maxime Chuquet
- Born: 28 February 1853; Rocroi, Ardennes, France
- Died: 7 June 1925 (aged 72)
- Occupations: Historian, biographer
- Known for: Jeunesse de Napoléon (1897–1899)
- Notable work: The Wars of the Revolution: The Siege of Mainz and the French Occupation of the Rhineland 1792-93* (2006)

Arthur Maxime Chuquet (French pronunciation: [aʁtyʁ maksim ʃykɛ]; 28 February 1853 – 7 June 1925) was a French historian and biographer.

He was born in Rocroi, Ardennes. He published his Jeunesse de Napoléon appearing in three volumes from 1897 to 1899. He became a member of the Institut de France in 1900.

== Works ==
- The Wars of the Revolution: The Siege of Mainz and the French Occupation of the Rhineland 1792-93: On Military Matters 2006
