= Roger Chauviré =

French writer (1880–1957)

- Born: 1880; Constantine, Algeria
- Died: 14 March 1957; Paris, France
- Occupations: Novelist; Poet; Historian
- Awards: Grand prix Gobert (1917); Prix Archon-Despérouses (1922); Prix Montyon (1927, 1930); Grand Prix du roman de l'Académie française (1933)

Roger Chauviré (1880, Constantine – 14 March 1957, Paris) was a French writer, winner of the 1933 edition of the Grand Prix du roman de l'Académie française.

== Biography ==
Roger Chauviré long taught at the National University of Ireland. A novelist, poet and historian, he wrote numerous articles and books on the mythological history and traditions of the Gaelic countries. He was also a specialist in the work of Jean Bodin and wrote a thesis published in 1914.

Chauviré won several prizes awarded by the Académie française including the Grand prix Gobert (1917) for Jean Bodin, auteur de la République, the Prix Archon-Despérouses (1922) for Le tombeau d’Hector, twice the Prix Montyon (1927) for La geste de la branche rouge ou l’Iliade irlandaise and (1930) for L’incantation and the Grand Prix du Roman (1930) for Mademoiselle de Boisdauphin.

The Irish war of independence took place during his first years in Ireland and he wrote a book on the subject " L'Irlande insurgée", later translated as "Ireland in rebellion". This was written under the pseudonym Sylvain Briollay. He took the name from the town of Briollay, in the Loire valley, where he spent his summers. A street in the town is named after him.

== Works ==
- 1914: Jean Bodin, auteur de "La République", Champion.
- 1926: La Geste de la Branche rouge, Librairie de France
- 1929: L'Incantation, Firmin-Didot
- 1933: Mademoiselle de Bois-Dauphin, Grand prix du roman de l'Académie française
- 1937: Le Secret de Marie Stuart, Armand Colin
- 1938: Cécile Vardoux, Flammarion
- 1947: preface of L'épopée irlandaise T2
- 1949: Contes ossianiques, Presses universitaires de France
- 1949: Greg le Libérateur, Flammarion
- 1951: La Guerre et l'amour, chronique du règne de Henri III, André Bonne
- 1953: Au fil des jours : poèmes, Éditions de l'Ouest
- 1954: Madame Marin ou la Vertu récompensée, André Bonne
