= Michel Antoine =

French historian

- Born: 28 September 1925; Saarbrücken, Territory of the Saar Basin
- Died: 20 February 2015 (aged 89); Paris, France
- Education: École Nationale des Chartes
- Occupation: Historian

Michel Antoine (28 September 1925 in Saarbrücken – 20 February 2015 in Paris), former professor at the University of Caen, research director at the Centre national de la recherche scientifique, and curator at the Archives nationales, was a noted biographer of Louis XV, and a French historian of the Modern period, specialising in France's role in European political civilisation in the eighteenth century.

== Career ==
Antoine was a specialist of the French state apparatus and of French and related European political civilization in the eighteenth century. He was an archivist and paleographer, with professional positions as curator at the Archives nationales, research director at the Centre national de la recherche scientifique, and professor at the University of Caen, and from 1987, director of studies at the École pratique des hautes études.

== Bibliography ==
- 1948: Le Secrétariat d'État de Bertin, 1763-1780, École des chartes, Paris.
- 1951: Les comités de ministres sous le règne de Louis XV, Librairie du Recueil Sirey, Paris.
- 1953: À propos des dénombrements de population des duchés de Lorraine et de Bar sous le règle de Léopold, Berger-Levrault, Nancy.
- 1954: Antonio Vivaldi et François de Lorraine, Berger-Levrault, Nancy.
- 1954: Le fonds du Conseil d'État et de la chancellerie de Lorraine aux Archives nationales, Berger-Levrault, Nancy.
- 1955: Le fonds du Conseil d'État du Roi aux Archives nationales, Imprimerie nationale, Paris.
- 1955: Le Secret du roi et la Russie jusqu'à la mort de la czarine Elisabeth en 1762, co written with Didier Ozanam, C. Klincksieck, Paris.
- 1955: Correspondance secrète inédite de Louis XV et du général Monet (1767–1772), co written with Didier Ozanam, Imprimerie nationale, Paris.
- 1956: Autour de François Couperin, Heugel et Cie, Paris.
- 1956: Correspondance secrète du comte de Broglie avec Louis XV, 1756–1774, co written with Didier Ozanam, C. Klincksieck, Paris.
- 1958: Les Conseils des finances sous le règne de Louis XV, PUF, Paris.
- 1965: Les manufactures de tapisserie des ducs de Lorraine au XVIIIe siècle (1698–1737), Faculté des lettres et des sciences humaines de l'Université de Nancy/Berger-Levrault (Annales de l'Est, Mémoire n° 26), Nancy.
- 1965 : Henry Desmarest (1661 - 1741), Biographie Critique, Paris Éditions A. et J. Picard & Cie 1965
- 1968: Les Arrêts du Conseil rendus au XVIIIe siècle pour le Département de la marine : 1723–1791, Société française d'histoire d'outre-mer, Paris.
- 1968: Inventaire des arrêts du Conseil du roi, règne de Louis XV : arrêts en commandement : inventaire analytique, Archives nationales, Paris.
- 1971: Le Conseil du Roi sous le règne de Louis XV, Droz, Paris/Geneva 1971. Grand prix Gobert.
- 1973: Le Conseil royal des Finances au XVIIIe siècle et le registre E 3659 des Archives nationales, Droz, Geneva.
- 1978: Le gouvernement et l'administration sous Louis XV. Dictionnaire biographique, éd. du CNRS, Paris.
- 1986: Le dur métier de Roi. Études sur la civilisation politique de la France d'Ancien Régime, PUF, Paris.
- 1989: Louis XV, Fayard, Paris. (Prix Nouveau Cercle Interallié 1989)
- 2003: Le cœur de l'État : surintendance, contrôle général et intendances des finances, 1552-1791, Fayard, Paris.
