= Charles de Viel-Castel =

French politician and baron

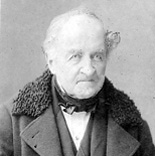
Charles de Viel-Castel

Charles-Louis-Gaspard-Gabriel de Salviac, baron de Viel Castel (14 October 1800, in Paris – 6 October 1887, in Paris) was a French historian and diplomat. He was a great-nephew of Mirabeau via his mother, and the elder brother of Horace de Viel-Castel.

== Biography ==
In 1818 he entered the diplomatic service. In 1829 he returned to France's ministry of foreign affairs, becoming its sous-directeur then its director of political affairs, but his career was interrupted by his offers of resignation after the revolutions of 1830 and 1848, which he made final after the coup of 1851. He was elected a member of the Académie française in 1878

== Main works ==
- Essai historique sur les deux Pitt (1845–1846), on Pitt the Elder and Pitt the Younger
- Histoire de la Restauration (20 volumes, 1860-1878), on the Bourbon Restoration
- Essai sur le théâtre espagnol (2 volumes, 1882), on Spanish theatre
- Histoire de la Restauration
