= Perrault (surname) =

Perrault is a surname. Notable people with the surname include:

- Augustin Perrault (1779–1859), woodworker, merchant and politician in Lower Canada
- C. Raymond Perrault (fl. 1974–present), artificial intelligence researcher
- Charles Perrault (1628–1703), French writer
- Charles-Hubert Perrault (1922–2019), Canadian businessman
- Charles-Ovide Perrault (1809–1837), lawyer and politician in Lower Canada
- Cindy Perrault (born 1996), French football goalkeeper
- Claude Perrault (1613–1688), French amateur architect, physician, natural philosopher and author, brother of Charles
- Dan Perrault, 21st century American television writer and producer
- Dominique Perrault (born 1953), French architect and urban planner
- Felix Perrault (1915–1986), American politician
- Fern Perrault (1927–2021), Canadian ice hockey player
- Gilles Perrault (1931–2023), French writer and journalist
- Jacques-Nicolas Perrault (1750–1812), seigneur, businessman and political figure in Lower Canada
- Jaime Perrault (born 2006), Canadian soccer player
- Jean Perrault (born 1945), Canadian politician
- Joe Perrault (1924–2010), American ski jumper
- Joël Perrault (born 1983), Canadian ice hockey player
- Joseph-Édouard Perrault (1874–1948), French Canadian politician
- Joseph-François Perrault (1753–1844), businessman and political figure in Lower Canada
- Joseph-Stanislas Perrault (1846–1907), politician, father of Joseph-Édouard
- Joseph-Xavier Perrault (1836–1905), Quebec educator and politician
- Kelly Perrault (born 1973), Canadian retired ice hockey player
- Léon Perrault (1832–1908), French painter
- Maurice Perrault (1857–1909), Canadian architect, civil engineer and politician
- Michel Perrault (1925–2010), Canadian composer, conductor, music educator and percussionist
- Olivier Perrault (1773–1827), seigneur, lawyer, judge and politician in Lower Canada
- Pierre Perrault (1927–1999), film director
- Pierre Perrault (scientist) (1608–1680), French hydrologist, Receiver General of Finances for Paris and author
- Ray Perrault (1926–2008), Canadian senator
- Serge Perrault (1920–2014), French ballet dancer and teacher

== Fictional characters ==
- Celeste Perrault, in the soap opera Days of our Lives
- Father Perrault, the founder of the lamasery in James Hilton's Lost Horizon

== See also ==
- Perrault (disambiguation)
- Perreault (disambiguation)
- Perraud (disambiguation)
- Perreau (disambiguation)
- Perrot (disambiguation)
- Perot (disambiguation)
