= Katia =

Feminine given name

- Gender: Female

Origin
- Meaning: Pure

Other names
- Related names: Katya, Yekaterina, Katherine, Catherine, Katerina

Katia is a feminine given name. It is a variant of Katya.

Notable people with this name include:

- Katia Aere (born 1971), Italian para-cyclist
- Katia Astafieff (born 1975), French writer
- Katia Beauchamp, American entrepreneur
- Katia Beaugeais (born 1976), Australian-French composer and saxophonist
- Katia Belabbas (born 1996), Algerian windsurfer
- Katia Belkhodja (born 1986), Canadian writer
- Katia Bellillo (born 1951), Italian politician
- Katia Benth (born 1975), French sprinter
- Katia Bertoldi, professor in applied mechanics
- Katia Buffetrille (born 1948), French Tibetologist
- Katia Canciani (born 1971), Canadian writer
- Katia Cardenal (born 1963), Nicaraguan singer
- Katia Caré, French singer and medievist
- Katia Clement-Heydra (born 1989), Canadian ice hockey player, coach, and administrator
- Katia Colturi (born 1971), Italian speed skater
- Katia Coppola (born 1993), Italian football striker
- Katia Dandoulaki (born 1948), Greek actress
- Katia Elizarova (born 1986), Russian model and actress
- Katia Elliott (born 1970), Swedish journalist
- Katia Escalera (born 1901), Bolivian operatic soprano
- Katia Follesa (born 1976), Italian comedian
- Katia Itzel García (born 1992), Mexican football referee
- Katia Goulioni (born 1981), Greek actress and costume designer
- Katia Granoff (1896–1989), French poet
- Katia Grenier, French microwave and microfluidics engineer
- Katia Griffiths (born 1981), Spanish freestyle skier
- Katia Grubisic (born 1978), Canadian writer, editor and translator
- Katia Guerreiro (born 1976), South African-born Portuguese fado singer
- Katia Gutiérrez (born 1989), Mexican boxer
- Katia Kameli (born 1973), French-Algerian visual artist
- Katia Kapovich (born 1960), Russian poet
- Katia Kouyaté, English footballer
- Katia Kuethe, German-born creative director
- Katia Ledoux (born 1990), French mezzo-soprano
- Katia Lewkowicz (born 1973), French-Israeli actress
- Katia Loritz (1932–2015), actress (1932-2015)
- Katia Lova (1914–1994), Bulgarian-born French film actress
- Katia Mann (1883–1980), German wife of Thomas Mann
- Katia Margaritoglou (born 1983), Greek model
- Katia Mosconi (born 1973), Italian speed skater
- Katia Noyes, American author
- Katia Obraczka, American electrical engineer
- Katia Overfeldt (born 1968), Belgian synchronized swimmer
- Katia Passerini, Italian academic administrator
- Katia Forbert Petersen (born 1949), Polish-Danish filmmaker
- Katia Piccolini (born 1973), Italian tennis player
- Katia Pietrosanti (born 1979), Italian rhythmic gymnast
- Katia Plaschka (born 2000), German coloratura soprano
- Katia Popov (1965–2018), Bulgarian violinist
- Katia Ragusa (born 1997), Italian cyclist
- Katia Ricciarelli (born 1946), Italian soprano
- Katia Rodrigues (born 1979), Brazilian volleyball player
- Katia Santibañez (born 1964), French abstract artist
- Katia Sastre (born 1976), Brazilian politician
- Katia Serra (born 1973), Italian footballer
- Katia Skanavi (born 1971), Russian pianist
- Katia Sycara, Greek-American computer scientist
- Katia Tarasconi (born 1973), Italian politician
- Katia Tchenko (born 1947), French actress
- Katia Tiutiunnik (born 1967), Australian musician
- Katia Todorova (born 1958), Bulgarian rower
- Katia Washington (born 1987), American film producer
- Katia Winter (born 1983), Swedish actress
- Katia Zini (born 1981), Italian short track skater
- Katia Zuccarelli (born 1992), Canadian singer-songwriter
