= Perrault =

Perrault may refer to:

- Perrault (surname), a list of people and fictional characters with the name
- Perrault LaRue (1925–1987), Canadian politician
- Perrault (horse) (1977–2001), British-bred Thoroughbred racehorse
- Perrault, Ontario, Canada

== See also ==
- Perrault syndrome, a gynaecologic disorder
- Perrault shorthand, an English adaptation of the Duployan shorthand
- Perreault (disambiguation)
- Perraud (disambiguation)
- Perreau (disambiguation)
- Perrot (disambiguation)
- Perot (disambiguation)
