= Robin Piccone =

Swimwear designer, pioneer of neoprene swimwear

- Education: Los Angeles Trade and Technical College
- Occupation: Fashion Designer
- Organization: Piccone Apparel
- Known for: Swimwear Design
- Notable work: Neoprene Swimwear

Robin Piccone is an American fashion designer known for pioneering the use of neoprene in her scuba style swimwear under the Body Glove label. Robin Piccone is often affectionately called the “Queen of Neoprene” due to her pioneering work with the material in swimwear design.

== Early life ==
Piccone, who was raised in Los Angeles, California, developed a passion for design from a young age. She attended Beverly Vista elementary school and graduated from Beverly Hills High School before enrolling at Los Angeles Trade Technical College, where she graduated with honors, winning 5 out of six gold thimbles and one silver.

== Career ==
Her first job was with swimwear company Cole of California, after which she relocated to New York to design for Bobbie Brooks. The Body Glove brand was known primarily to divers and surfers until 1985, when Piccone licensed a line of swimsuits. Her designs quickly gained popularity and a devoted following. In 1985, she established her own company at the age of 24 in her garage in Venice, California. Piccones swimsuits in her debut collection became instant icons of 80s style, widely imitated throughout the swimwear industry, landing her several magazine covers. Through Piccones association with Patricia Field, she was introduced to RuPaul, for whom she designed swimwear and gowns. In 1990, she began her namesake collection, which she continues to this day. Piccone has served as a mentor to students at Otis College of Art and Design until 2010.

=== Body Glove ===
In 1986, Piccone partnered with Body Glove, becoming one of the first designers to secure a licensing agreement with the established wetsuit manufacturer. Piccone played a key role in transforming neoprene - a synthetic rubber traditionally associated with wetsuits, scuba diving, and surfing - into a fashionable material. Piccone played a key role in transforming neoprene - a synthetic rubber traditionally associated with wetsuits, scuba diving, and surfing - into a fashionable material. Her sportswear designs appeared in publications such as Vogue, Cosmopolitan, Lucky, Sports Illustrated, Seventeen, Self, More, Harper’s Bazaar, Mademoiselle, Time, Newsweek and GQ.

=== Guess ===
In 1994, after introducing neoprene to fashion under the Body Glove label, Piccone established her own swimwear and sportswear company, Piccone Apparel. She entered into a licensing agreement to design a junior swimwear collection for Guess?, marking the brand’s first swimwear line in six years. Paul Marciano, co-chairman of Guess?, stated that the company had been "waiting for the right candidate to come along" before selecting Piccone.

== Recognitions and community involvement ==
In 1989, Piccone received “California Designer of the Year” award. During the award presentation, she showcased a model wearing a hot-pink tank swimsuit emblazoned with the slogan "Keep Our Water Clean" across the chest. The ensemble was complemented by a mesh beach coat cover-up, which was constructed from plastic six-pack rings adorned with hypodermic needles. While Piccone's primary intention was to make a bold environmental statement, she acknowledged the long-term benefits of her advocacy. Piccone explained that her involvement pays off in the long run, as the condition of the state’s beaches and lakes directly affects her business, in addition to the concern for her son’s future.

Piccone is an active member of the CFDA (Council of Fashion Designers of America). She actively engages in community involvement and contributes to fundraising projects for pediatric AIDS research at the City of Hope National Medical Center. She was honored by the City of Hope National Medical Center as “woman of the year” in 1990.

Piccones swimwear is in the permanent collection of the Costume Institute of the Metropolitan Museum of Art in New York. Her innovative use of neoprene fabric resulted in the exhibition of two of her original neoprene suits and a mini skirt.
