= Sexual predator =

Person obtaining sexual contact with another person

A sexual predator is a person seen as obtaining or trying to obtain sexual contact with another person in a metaphorically "predatory" or abusive manner. Analogous to how a predator hunts down its prey, so the sexual predator is thought to "hunt" for their sex partners. People who commit sex crimes, such as rape or child sexual abuse, are commonly referred to as sexual predators, particularly in tabloid media or as a power phrase by politicians.

== Definitions and distinctions ==
=== Etymology and usage ===
FBI Director J. Edgar Hoover is attributed with the first known use of the term in the 1920s. It was popularized in the 1990s by Andrew Vachss and 48 Hours. The word is not found at all in newspapers of 1985 and 1986, but occurs 321 times in 1992, 865 times in 1994, and 924 times in 1995. Some U.S. states have a special status for criminals designated as sexually violent predators, which allows these offenders to be held in prison after their sentence is complete if they are considered to be a risk to the public. They can also be placed on a sex offender list which is viewable by everyone on the Internet.

The BDSM community often uses "predator" as a term for someone who seeks out dominance and submission partners that are new to the lifestyle. These partners would use the submissive or dominant in a manner that suited their personal needs instead of encouraging them to grow and learn on their own about this culture. In this same circle and in broader circles, there are also predators who are simply hunters who seek a certain type of personality, age group, fetish, or play style; they often refer to themselves as predators and enjoy the game of Hunter/Prey. (For an example of this usage in broader circles, see Kim France's comments in The New York Times, on Janis Joplin's sexuality.)

=== Distinction from sex offenders ===
The term "sexual predator" is often considered distinct from "sex offender". For example, many U.S. states make legal distinctions between these categories, defining a "sexual offender" as a person who has committed a sexual offense. The term "sexual predator" is often used to refer to a person who habitually seeks out sexual situations that are deemed exploitative. However, in some states in the U.S., the term "sexual predator" is applied to anyone who has been convicted of certain crimes, regardless of whether or not there is a history of similar behavior. In the state of Illinois, for instance, a person convicted of any sex crime against a minor is designated a sexual predator, no matter the nature of the crime (violent versus statutory, or perpetrated against a young child versus a teenager), and regardless of past behavior. This has led to criticism that the term is being misused, or overused, and thus has lost its original meaning and effectiveness.

== See also ==
- Civil confinement
- Sex offender registries in the United States
