= J.J. Garcia-Luna-Aceves =

Mexican-American computer engineering professor and researcher

J. J. Garcia-Luna-Aceves is a Mexican-American computer engineer, currently professor at the University of Toronto's Department of Electrical and Computer Engineering. Until 2023, he was the distinguished professor of computer science and engineering at University of California, Santa Cruz (UCSC), holding the Jack Baskin Endowed Chair of Computer Engineering, is CITRIS dampus director for UCSC, and was a principal scientist at the Xerox Palo Alto Research Center (Xerox PARC). He is a Fellow of the IEEE for contributions to theory and design of communication protocols for network routing and channel access and a fellow to AAAS.

== Education ==
He obtained his B.S. in electrical engineering from the Universidad Iberoamericana ("La Ibero"), Mexico City, Mexico in 1977 and his M.S. and Ph.D., electrical engineering from the University of Hawaii at Manoa in 1980 and 1983.

== Career ==
Prior to joining UCSC in 1993, he was a center director at SRI International in Menlo Park, California. He first joined SRI as an SRI International Fellow in 1982. He was a visiting professor at Sun Labs in Menlo Park, California in 1999, and was a principal of protocol design for NOKIA from 1999 to 2003. He is past chair of the Computer Engineering Department at UCSC.

Hwwas elected a corresponding member of the Mexican Academy of Sciences (Academia Mexicana de Ciencias) in 2013. He was elected an IEEE Fellow in 2006, an ACM Fellow in 2008, and a AAAS Fellow in 2010.

He received the IEEE MILCOM Technical Achievement Award in 2016 and the IEEE Computer Society Technical Achievement Award in 2011 from the IEEE Communications Society Ad Hoc and Sensor Networks Technical Committee (AHSN TC) Technical Recognition Award in 2012 for contributions to the theory and design of communication protocols for routing and channel access in ad-hoc wireless networks; and the SRI International Exceptional-Achievement Award in 1985 and 1989 for multimedia communications and adaptive routing algorithms. He was a visiting professor at the Computing Research Center of the National Polytechnic Institute in Mexico City, Mexico in 2012.

He is the co-recipient of the IEEE Fred W. Ellersick 2008 MILCOM Award for Best Unclassified Paper.

His current research interest is the analysis and design of algorithms and protocols for computer communication. At UCSC, he leads the Computer Communication Research Group (CCRG), which is home to many research projects that focus on internetworking, information-centric networks, wireless networks, the Internet of Things, and cyber-physical networks.

== Publications ==
His most cited papers are:

- Murthy S, Garcia-Luna-Aceves JJ. An efficient routing protocol for wireless networks. Mobile Networks and applications. 1996 Jun;1(2):183-97.(Cited 2065 times, according to Google Scholar)
- Rajendran V, Obraczka K, Garcia-Luna-Aceves JJ. Energy-efficient collision-free medium access control for wireless sensor networks. In Proceedings of the 1st international conference on Embedded networked sensor systems 2003 Nov 5 (pp. 181–192). (Cited 2061 times, according to Google Scholar.)
- Garcia-Luna-Aceves JJ, Madruga EL. The core-assisted mesh protocol. IEEE Journal on selected Areas in Communications. 1999 Aug;17(8):1380-94.(Cited 950 times, according to Google Scholar.)
- Fullmer CL, Garcia-Luna-Aceves JJ. Floor acquisition multiple access (FAMA) for packet-radio networks. InProceedings of the conference on Applications, technologies, architectures, and protocols for computer communication 1995 Oct 1 (pp. 262–273).(Cited 838 times, according to Google Scholar.)
- Fullmer CL, Garcia-Luna-Aceves JJ. Solutions to hidden terminal problems in wireless networks. ACM SIGCOMM Computer Communication Review. 1997 Oct 1;27(4):39-49.(Cited 528 times, according to Google Scholar.)
