= Marcel Pérès =

French musician

Marcel Pérès (born 15 July 1956, Oran, Algeria) is a French musicologist, composer, choral director and singer, and the founder of the early music group Ensemble Organum. He is an authority on Gregorian and pre-Gregorian chant.

Pérès was born into an Algerian family of Spanish origin which was repatriated to France. He grew up in Nice, where he sang at the cathedral and was organist at the Anglican church. He trained in organ and composition at the Nice conservatoire, before continuing his studies in church music at the Royal School of Church Music and at English cathedrals. He worked at the Studio de musique ancienne de Montréal (Montreal early music studio) and for the National Film Board of Canada. In 1979 he returned to France where he studied medieval music under Michel Huglo at the École pratique des hautes études.

In 1984 Peres became director of ARIMM, the Atelier pour la Recherche sur l’Interprétation des Musiques Médiévales (or "Workshop for Research on the Performance of Medieval Music") with the support of the Fondation Royaumont, created by the Goüin family. In 1994 the Atelier became CERIMM, the Centre Européen pour la Recherche sur l'Interprétation des Musiques Médiévales (or "European Centre for Research on the Performance of Medieval Music"). During that time, he taught medieval musicology to various students, like Katia Caré.

In 2001 Pérès and his group Ensemble Organum moved to Moissac where he founded CIRMA, the Centre itinérant de recherche sur les musiques anciennes (or "Itinerant Centre for Research into Ancient Music").

He was musical director of Kaj Munk's play, Ordet, at the Festival d'Avignon in 2008.

Pérès' compositions include Le Livre des morts égyptiens ("The Egyptian Book of the Dead"), written in 1979, and Mysteria Apocalypsis.

== Awards ==
In 1990 he was awarded the Leonardo da Vinci Prize by the Italian government, and Since 1996 he has been a Chevalier dans l'Ordre des Arts et des Lettres. In 2013 he received a title of Honorary Citizen of Jarosław.

== Ensemble Organum ==
In 1982 Peres founded Ensemble Organum, a group specialising in "pre- and para-Gregorian" chant. The group has been based at three medieval monastic sites.

- Sénanque Abbey, an active Cistercian community.
- Royaumont Abbey, a former Cistercian monastery near Asnières-sur-Oise, which is run as a cultural centre.
- Moissac Abbey, a former Benedictine monastery
