= Derek Desierto =

Canadian-Filipino designer & illustrator

Derek Desierto is a Canadian-Filipino designer and illustrator of children's books.

== Early life ==
Desierto comes from a self-described "immigrant family" and characterized his upbringing as traditional. He attended private schools as a child.

== Career ==
At age 21, Desierto started an eyewear line called Derek Cardigan.

While scrolling on Instagram, author Eva Chen came across Desierto's illustrations and reached out to him to ask if he had ever illustrated a children's book. Juno Valentine and the Magical Shoes was released in November 2018, marking his first illustrator credit. The duo's second book, A Is For Awesome, was released in February 2019. Later that year, Desierto illustrated Chen's Juno Valentine and the Fantastic Fashion Adventure.

In 2021, Desierto authored his first book, Oddbird, which he also illustrated. Three years later, he published the follow-up book Oddbird's Chosen Family.

Desierto's animation work has been recognized by the Ottawa International Animation Festival, the National Cartoonist Society, and 9 Story Media Group.

== Publications ==
=== Authored ===
- Desierto, Derek (2021). Oddbird. Feiwel & Friends. ISBN 978-1-250-88281-3.
- Desierto, Derek (2024). Oddbird's Chosen Family. New York: Feiwel and Friends. ISBN 978-1-250-86468-0. OCLC 1434648592.

=== Illustrated ===
- Chen, Eva (2019). Juno Valentine and the Magical Shoes. New York: Feiwel & Friends. ISBN 978-1-250-29726-6.
- Chen, Eva (2019). A Is for Awesome! 23 Iconic Women Who Changed the World. New York: Feiwel and Friends. ISBN 978-1-250-21599-4. OCLC 1048941554.
- Chen, Eva (2019). Juno Valentine and the Fantastic Fashion Adventure. New York: Feiwel and Friends. ISBN 978-1-250-29730-3.
- Solheim, James (2021). Grandma's Are Greater than Great. New York: Greenwillow Books. ISBN 978-0-06-267123-3.
- Tanumihardja, Patricia (2023). Jimmy's Shoes: The Story of Jimmy Choo, Shoemaker to a Princess. New York: Abrams Books for Young Readers. ISBN 978-1-64700-347-0.
