= Charles Perrot =

Charles Perrot may refer to:

- Charles Perrot (minister) (1541–1608), Reformed minister who served in Geneva
- Charles Perrot (politician) (1642–1686), Member of Parliament for Oxford University
- Charles Perrot (priest) (1929–2013), Roman Catholic priest and theologian

== See also ==
- Charles Perrat, French palaeographer
- Charles Parrot, American comedian and filmmaker
