= Charles Perrault =

French author (1628–1703)

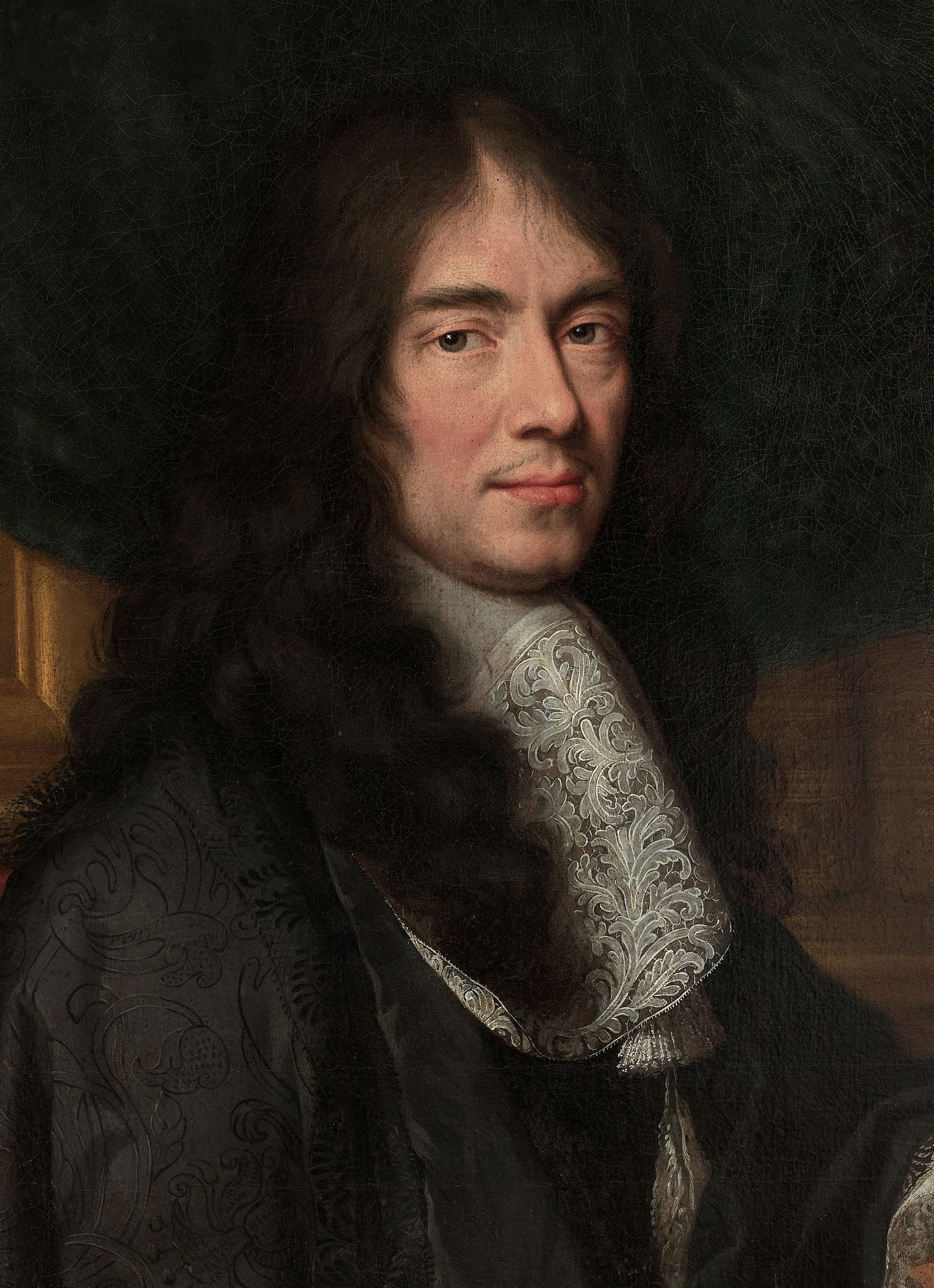
- Portrait by Charles Le Brun, c. 1670
- Born: 12 January 1628; Paris, France
- Died: 16 May 1703 (aged 75); Paris, France
- Occupation: Author
- Relatives: Pierre Perrault (brother); Claude Perrault (brother); Marie-Jeanne L'Héritier (niece)
- Writing career
- Genre: Fairy tale
- Notable works: "The Sleeping Beauty"; "Little Red Riding Hood"; "Cinderella"; "Puss in Boots"; "Bluebeard"

Charles Perrault (/pɛˈroʊ/ perr-OH, US also /pəˈroʊ/ pə-ROH, French: [ʃaʁl pɛʁo]; 12 January 1628 – 16 May 1703) was a French author and member of the Académie Française. He laid the foundations for a new literary genre, the fairy tale, with his works derived from earlier folk tales, published in his 1697 book Histoires ou contes du temps passé. The best known of his tales include "Little Red Riding Hood", "Cinderella", "Puss in Boots", "Sleeping Beauty", and "Bluebeard".

Some of Perrault's versions of old stories influenced the German versions published by the Brothers Grimm more than 100 years later. The stories continue to be printed and have been adapted to most entertainment formats. Perrault was an influential figure in the 17th-century French literary scene and was the leader of the Modern faction during the Quarrel of the Ancients and the Moderns.

== Life and work ==
Charles Perrault was born in Paris on 12 January 1628, to a wealthy bourgeois family and was the seventh child of Pierre Perrault and Paquette Le Clerc. He attended very good schools and studied law before embarking on a career in government service, following in the footsteps of his father and elder brother Jean.

He took part in the creation of the Academy of Sciences as well as the restoration of the Academy of Painting. In 1654, he moved in with his brother Pierre, who had purchased the position of chief tax collector of the city of Paris. When the Academy of Inscriptions and Belles-Lettres was founded in 1663, Perrault was appointed its secretary and served under Jean Baptiste Colbert, finance minister to King Louis XIV. Jean Chapelain, Amable de Bourzeys, and Jacques Cassagne (the King's librarian) were also appointed.

Using his influence as Colbert's administrative aide, in April 1667 he was able to get his brother, Claude Perrault, appointed to a committee of three, the Petit Conseil, also including Louis Le Vau and Charles Le Brun, who designed the new section of the Louvre, the Colonnade, built between 1667 and 1674, to be overseen by Colbert. The design was chosen over designs by Gian Lorenzo Bernini (with whom, as Perrault recounts in his Memoirs, he had stormy relations while the Italian artist was in residence at Louis' court in 1665) and François Mansart. One of the factors leading to this choice included the fear of high costs, and second was the personal antagonism between Bernini and leading members of Louis' court, including Colbert and Perrault. King Louis himself maintained a public air of benevolence towards Bernini, ordering the issuing of a royal bronze portrait medal in honor of the artist in 1674. However, as Perrault further describes in his Memoirs, the king harbored private resentment at Bernini's displays of arrogance. The king was so displeased with Bernini's equestrian statue of him that he ordered it to be destroyed; however, his courtiers prevailed upon him to have it redone instead, with a head depicting the Roman hero Marcus Curtius.

In 1668, Perrault wrote La Peinture (Painting) to honor the king's first painter, Charles Le Brun. He also wrote Courses de tetes et de bague (Head and Ring Races, 1670), written to commemorate the 1662 celebrations staged by Louis for his mistress, Louise-Françoise de La Baume le Blanc, duchesse de La Vallière.

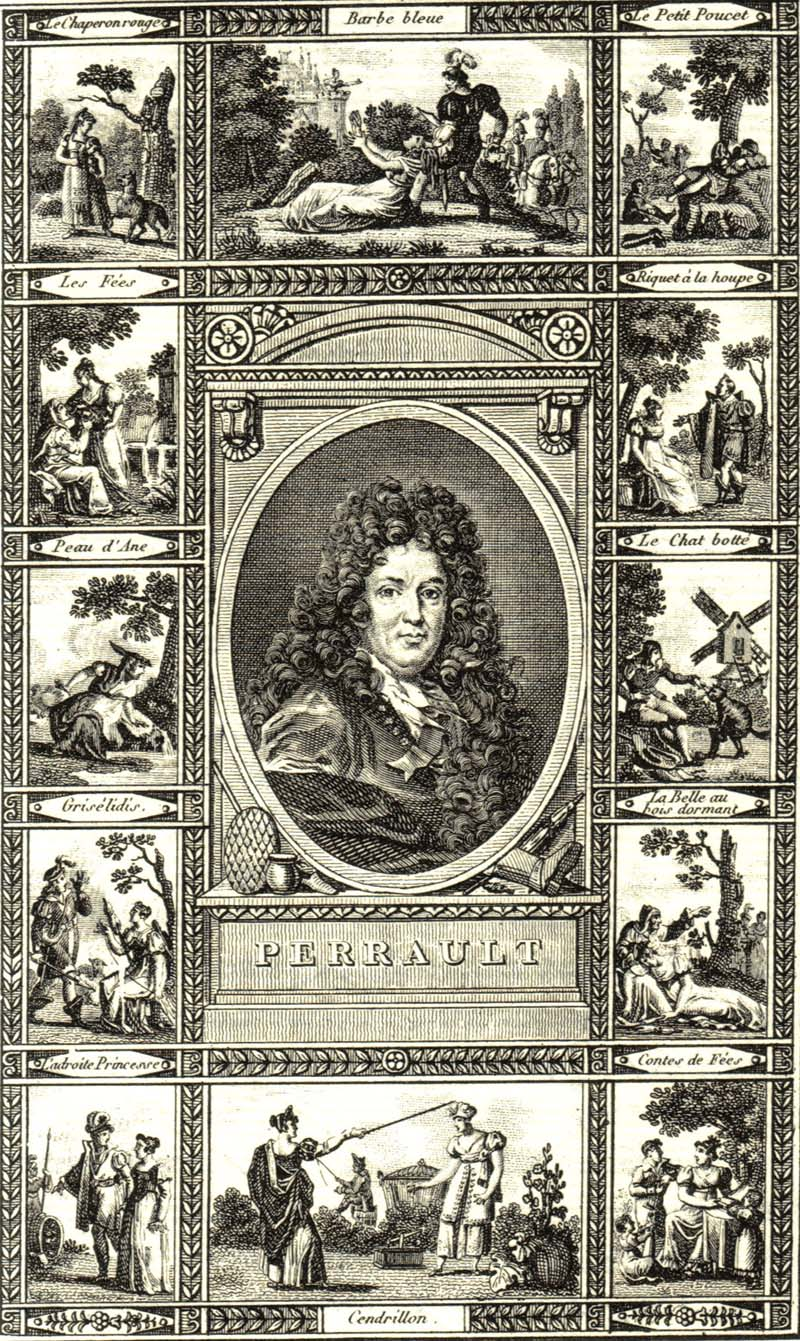
Perrault in an early 19th-century engraved frontispiece

At Colbert's instigation, Perrault was elected to the Académie française in 1671.

He married Marie Guichon, who was aged 19, in 1672. She died in 1678.

In 1669 Perrault advised Louis XIV to include thirty-nine fountains each representing one of the fables of Aesop in the labyrinth of Versailles in the gardens of Versailles. The work was carried out between 1672 and 1677. Water jets spurting from the animals' mouths were conceived to give the impression of speech between the creatures. There was a plaque with a caption and a quatrain written by the poet Isaac de Benserade next to each fountain. Perrault produced the guidebook for the labyrinth, Labyrinte de Versailles, printed at the royal press, Paris, in 1677, and illustrated by Sebastien le Clerc.

Philippe Quinault, a longtime family friend of the Perraults, quickly gained a reputation as the librettist for the new musical genre known as opera, collaborating with composer Jean-Baptiste Lully. After Alceste (1674) was denounced by traditionalists who rejected it for deviating from classical theater, Perrault wrote in response Critique de l'Opéra (1674), in which he praised the merits of Alceste over the tragedy of the same name by Euripides.

This treatise on Alceste initiated the Quarrel of the Ancients and the Moderns (Querelle des Anciens et des Modernes), which pitted supporters of the literature of Antiquity (the "Ancients") against supporters of the literature from the century of Louis XIV (the "Moderns"). He was on the side of the Moderns and wrote Le Siècle de Louis le Grand (The Century of Louis the Great, 1687) and Parallèle des Anciens et des Modernes (Parallel between Ancients and Moderns, 1688–1692) where he attempted to prove the superiority of the literature of his century. Le Siècle de Louis le Grand was written in celebration of Louis XIV's recovery from a life-threatening operation. Perrault argued that because of Louis's enlightened rule, the present age was superior in every respect to ancient times. He also claimed that even modern French literature was superior to the works of antiquity, and that, after all, even Homer nods.

In 1682, Colbert forced Perrault into retirement at the age of 56, assigning his tasks to his own son, Jules-Armand, marquis d'Ormoy. Colbert would die the next year, and Perrault stopped receiving the pension given to him as a writer. Colbert's bitter rival succeeded him, François-Michel le Tellier, Marquis de Louvois, and quickly removed Perrault from his other appointments.

After this, in 1686, Perrault decided to write epic poetry and show his genuine devotion to Christianity, writing Saint Paulin, évêque de Nôle (St. Paulinus, Bishop of Nola, about Paulinus of Nola). Just like Jean Chapelain's La Pucelle, ou la France délivrée, an epic poem about Joan of Arc, Perrault became a target of mockery from Nicolas Boileau-Despréaux.

Charles Perrault died in Paris on 16 May 1703, at the age of 75. On 12 January 2016, Google honoured him with a doodle by artist Sophie Diao depicting characters from the Tales of Mother Goose (Histoires ou contes du temps passé).

== Fairy tales ==
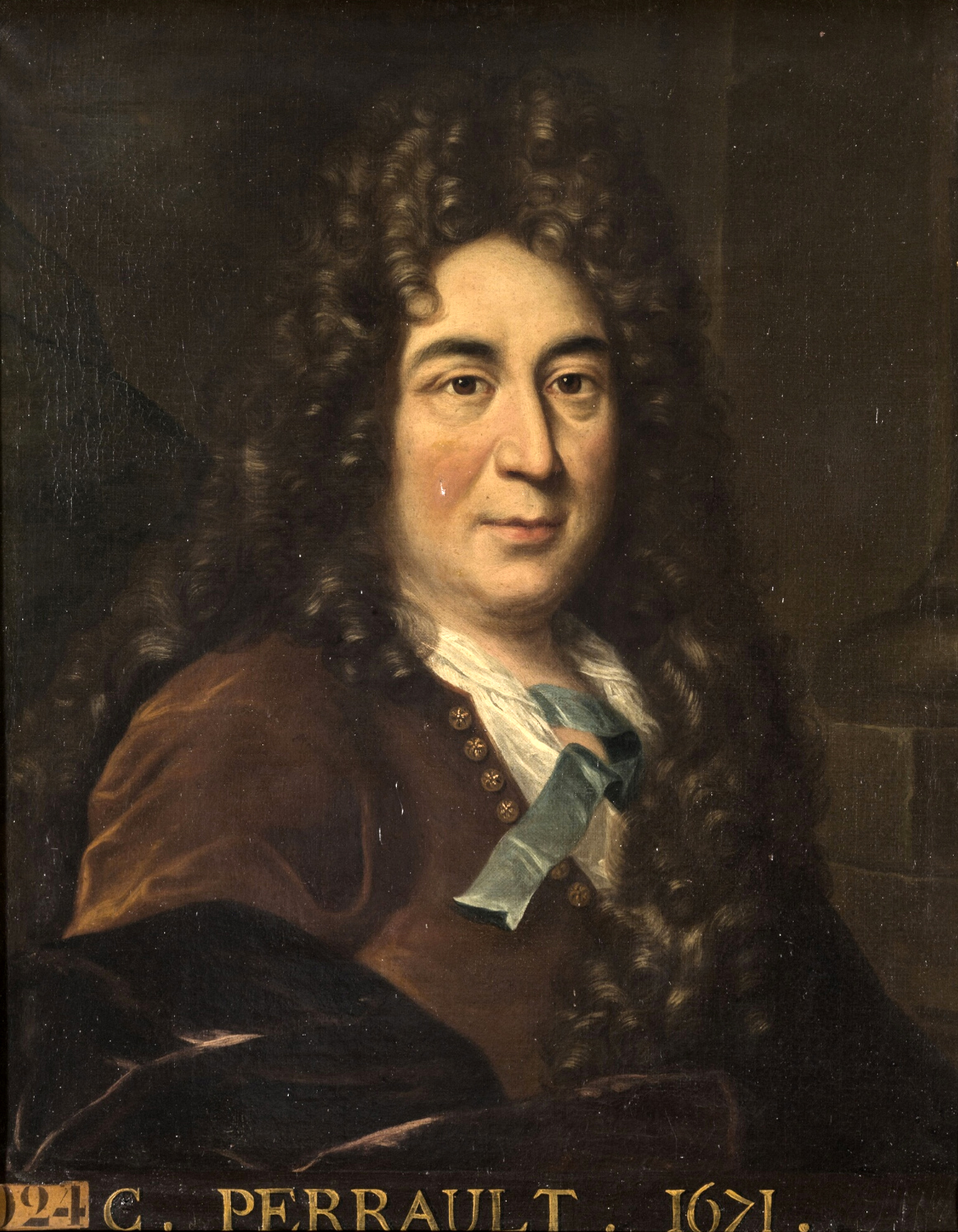
Portrait of Perrault, c. 1685–1700 (the visible date of 1671 is when he was elected to the French Academy)

In 1695, when he was 67, Perrault lost his position as secretary and decided to dedicate himself to his children. In 1697 he published Tales and Stories of the Past with Morals (Histoires ou Contes du Temps passé, avec des moralités), subtitled Tales of Mother Goose (Les Contes de ma Mère l'Oye). (The spelling of the name is with "y" although modern French uses only an "i".) This "Mother Goose" has never been identified as a person, but used to refer to popular and rural storytelling traditions in proverbial phrases of the time. (Source : Dictionnaire de l'Académie, 1694, quoted by Nathalie Froloff in her edition of the Tales (Gallimard, Folio, Paris, 1999.- p. 10).) These tales, based on European popular tradition, became very popular in France. Of all his abundant literary production in verse and in prose (odes, epic poetry, essays, etc.) these little stories for children are the only works still read today, and he is often credited as the founder of the modern fairy tale genre. Naturally, his work reflects awareness of earlier fairy tales written in the salons, most notably by Marie-Catherine Le Jumel de Barneville, Baroness d'Aulnoy, who coined the phrase "fairy tale" and wrote tales as early as 1690.

Some of his popular stories, particularly "Cinderella" and "The Sleeping Beauty", are still commonly told similar to the way Perrault had written them, while others have been revised over the years. For example, some versions of "Sleeping Beauty" published today are based partially on a Brothers Grimm tale, "Little Briar Rose", a modified version of the Perrault story.

Perrault had written "Little Red Riding Hood" as a warning to readers about strangers preying on young girls walking through the forest. He concludes his fairy tale with a moral, cautioning women and young girls about the dangers of trusting men. He states: "Watch out if you haven't learned that tame wolves/ Are the most dangerous of all". Perrault warns the readers about the manipulation and false appearances some men portray: "I say Wolf, for all wolves are not of the same sort; there is one kind with an amenable disposition – neither noisy, nor hateful, nor angry, but tame, obliging and gentle, following the young maids in the streets, even into their homes. Alas! Who does not know that these gentle wolves are of all such creatures the most dangerous!" Indeed, in Perrault's version, the girl gets into bed with the wolf and is devoured at the end of the story.

He had actually published his collection under the name of his last son (born in 1678), Pierre (Perrault) Darmancourt ("Armancourt" being the name of a property he bought for him), probably fearful of criticism from the "Ancients". In the tales, he used images from around him, such as the Chateau Ussé for "The Sleeping Beauty", and the Marquis of the Château d'Oiron as the model for the Marquis de Carabas in "Puss in Boots". He ornamented his folktale subject matter with details, asides and subtext drawn from the world of fashion. Following up on these tales, he translated the Fabulae Centum (100 Fables) of the Latin poet Gabriele Faerno into French verse in 1699.

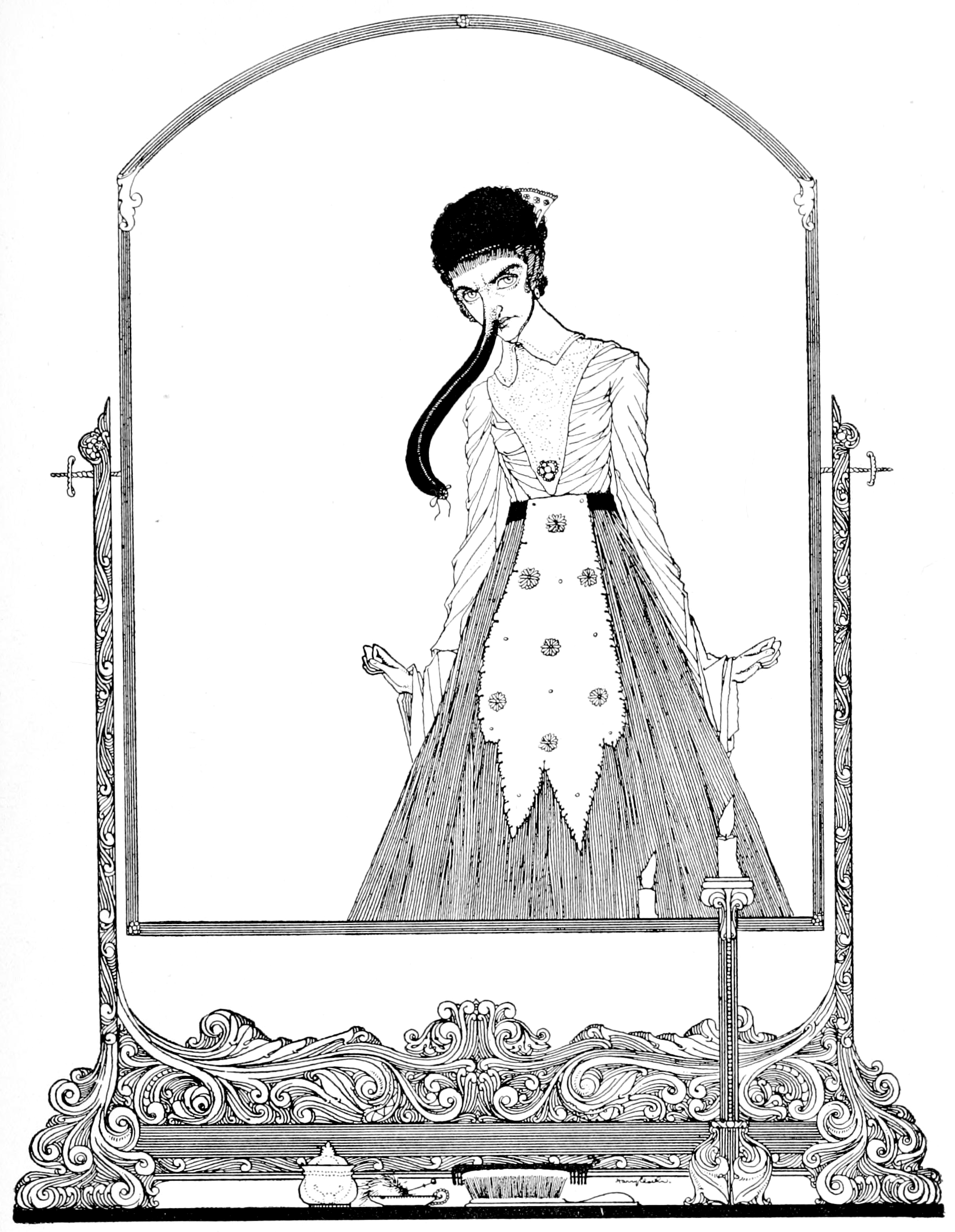
Page 133, illustration from Fairy tales of Charles Perrault

== See also ==
- Antoine Galland
- Alexander Afanasyev
- Brothers Grimm
- Charles Deulin
- Giambattista Basile
- Giovanni Francesco Straparola, widely regarded as the first person to compile a collection of fairy tales
- Gustave Doré, created the illustration of a wolf and young girl
- Hans Christian Andersen, who continued the fairy tale genre in the 19th century
- Madame d'Aulnoy
