= Perreau =

Perreau is a French-language surname. It may refer to:

- Ben Perreau (born 19800, British journalist and entrepreneur
- Bruno Perreau (born 1976), French political scientist
- Gigi Perreau (born 1941), American actress
- Joëlle Perreau (born 1974), Seychellois linguist
- Olivier Perreau (born 1986), French equestrian
- Pietro Perreau (1827–1911), Italian librarian, academic, and Hebraist
- Stéphan Perreau (born 1969), French flautist and art historian
- Yann Perreau (born 1976), Canadian singer from Quebec

== See also ==
- Louis de Perreau, Sieur de Castillon, French ambassador to England during the reign of Henry VIII
- Perot (disambiguation)
- Perrot (disambiguation)
