= Eva Chen (editor) =

Fashion editor and children's book author

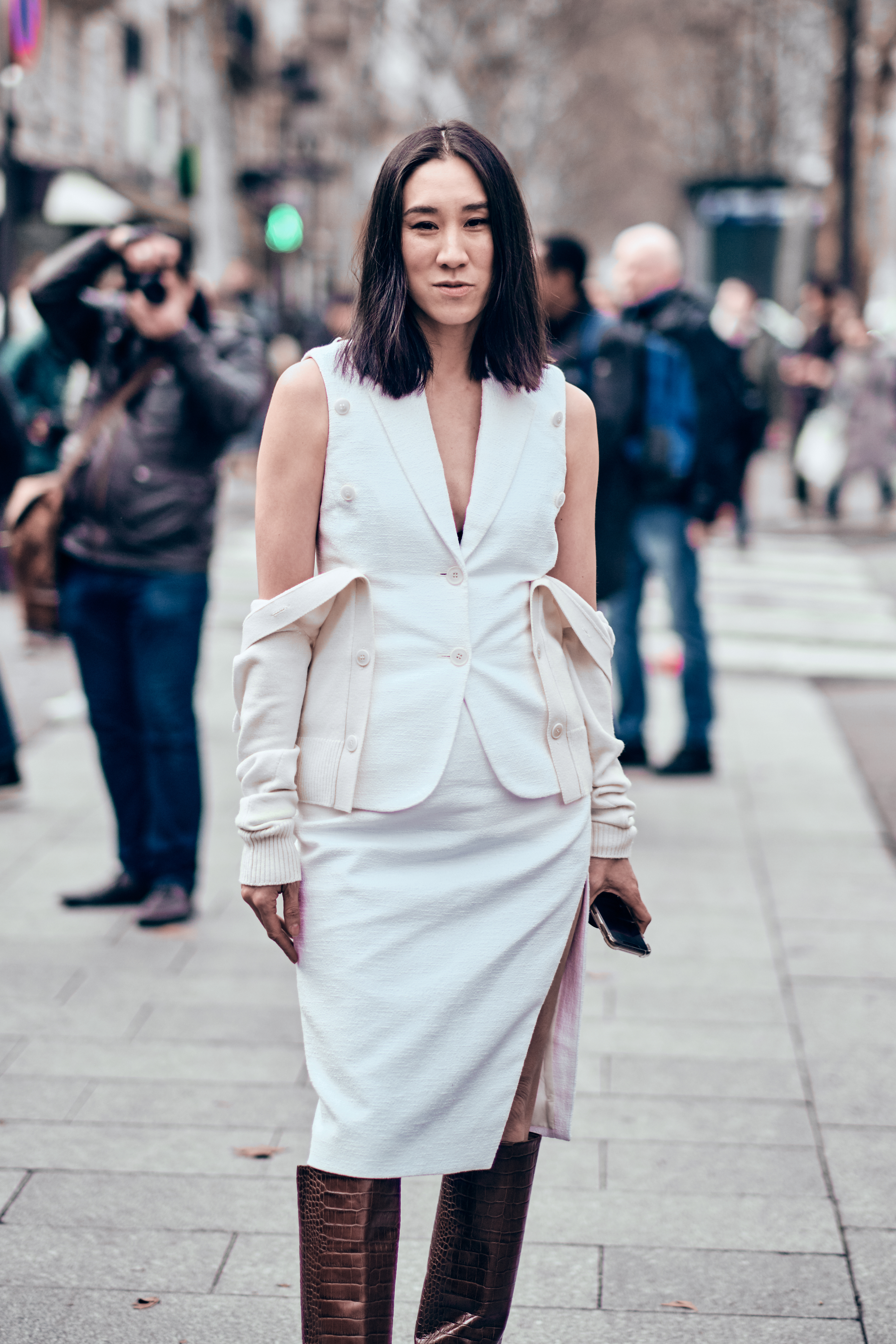
- Chen at Paris Fashion Week 2019
- Born: 1980 (age 45–46)
- Education: Johns Hopkins University
- Occupation: Fashion editor
- Organization: Instagram
- Known for: Editor of Lucky
- Spouse: Thomas Bannister
- Children: 3

Eva Chen (born 1980) is an American journalist. She is the director of fashion partnerships at Instagram and a children's book author. Previously she was editor-in-chief of Lucky and beauty and health director at Teen Vogue.

== Early life ==
Chen grew up in New York. Her parents, who are originally from Taipei and Shanghai, own a consulting textile import-export business, and Chen attributes her early love of fashion to her mother's influence. Chen attended the Brearley School, then went to college at Johns Hopkins University where she was pre-med, but eventually decided to major in English. She pursued her master's degree in journalism at Columbia University.

== Career ==
In college, Chen interned for fashion magazine Harper's Bazaar. After graduating from Hopkins in 2001, she worked briefly for Cravath, Swaine & Moore before joining the then-recently launched shopping magazine Lucky, where she worked in the credits department logging the prices and sellers for the magazine's array of products and eventually became editor-in-chief. She next moved to Elle where she worked in the beauty department for three years before she became beauty editor of Teen Vogue.

At Lucky, Chen was the youngest editor-in-chief in the magazine's history. She also became the first head of a commercial arm for the publication, Lucky Shops, serving as both editor-in-chief for the magazine and chief creative officer.

In July 2015, Chen joined Instagram, owned by Facebook, to develop partnerships with fashion brands. She is presently Head of Fashion Partnerships for the social media platform, and has launched a number of fashion and e-commerce features at Instagram, including shopping fashion looks directly from influencers' feeds and the Instagram Shop account.

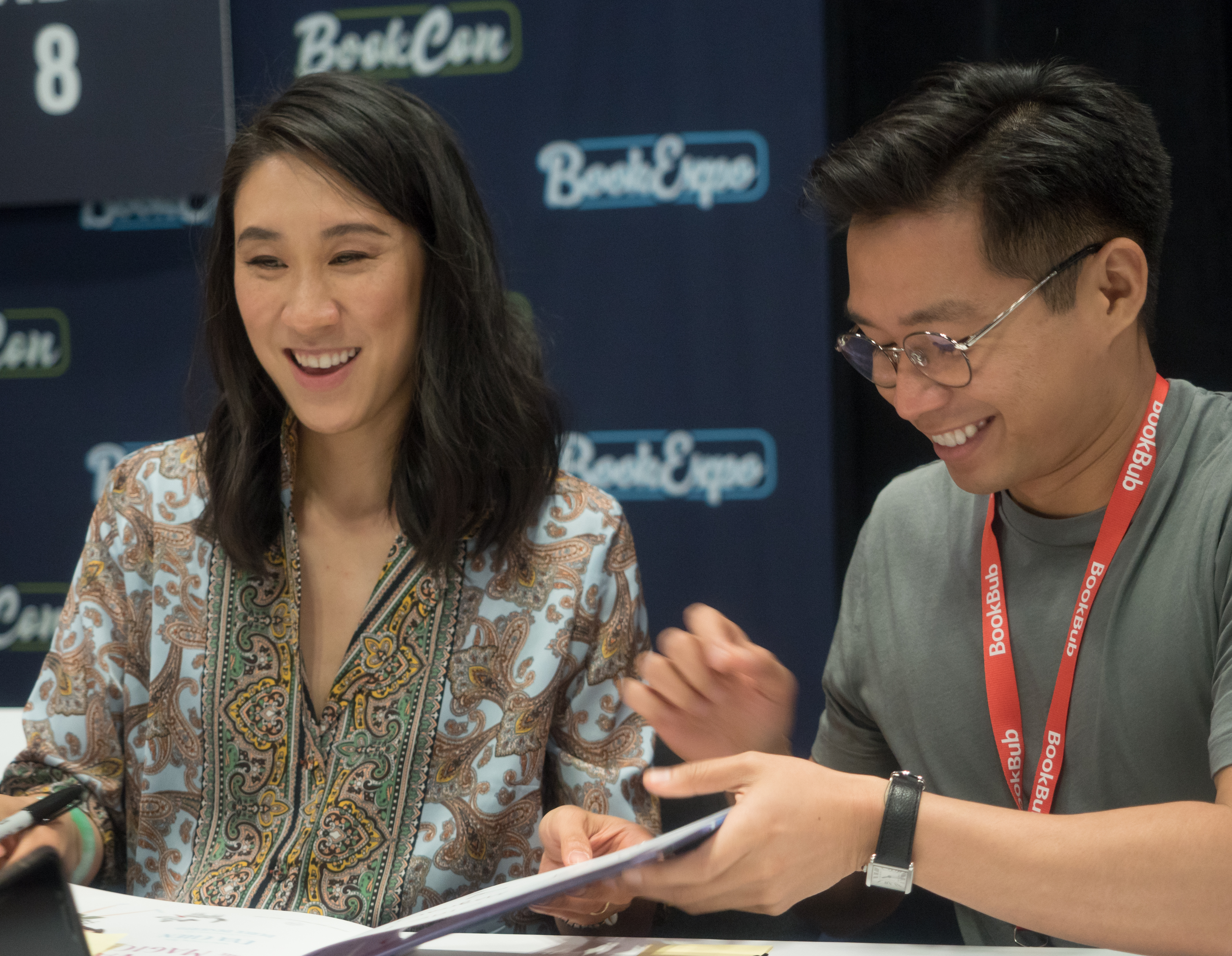
Chen with illustrator Derek Desierto signing books at BookCon in 2019

On May 27, 2020, Chen gave remarks at her alma mater Johns Hopkins University's Commencement ceremony.

Chen is also an author of several children's books, including I Am Golden (2022), which focuses on uplifting Asian American children and teaching them self love and validation.

=== Children's books ===
- Juno Valentine and the Magical Shoes (2018), illustrated by Derek Desierto
- A Is for Awesome: 23 Iconic Women Who Changed the World (2019), illustrated by Derek Desierto
- Juno Valentine and the Fantastic Fashion Adventure (2019), illustrated by Derek Desierto
- 3 2 1 Awesome!: 20 Fearless Women Who Dared to Be Different (2020), illustrated by Derek Desierto
- Roxy the Last Unisaurus Rex (2020), illustrated by Matthew Riviera
- Roxy the Unisaurus Rex Presents: Oh No! The Talent Show (2021), illustrated by Matthew Riviera
- I Am Golden (2022), illustrated by Sophie Diao
- Colors of Awesome (2022), illustrated by Matthew Riviera

== Personal life ==
In 2000, Chen studied abroad for a year in England at Oxford, where she met her husband, Thomas Bannister. Chen and Bannister have three children; born in 2015, 2017, and 2021.
