= Katia Margaritoglou =

Greek model

- Born: Katia Margaritoglou; 1975 (age 50–51); Athens, Greece
- Modeling information
- Height: 1.78 m (5 ft 10 in)
- Hair color: Blond
- Eye color: Green

Katia Marie Margaritoglou, in Greek: Κάτια Μαργαρίτογλου, is a Greek fashion model and beauty titleholder. In 1998, she won the title Miss Hellas (Greek: Μις Ελλάς) at the Miss Star Hellas pageant and represented Greece at the Miss World 1998 pageant event which took place in the Seychelles. Her face has appeared on the covers of such magazines as Life & Style, Men Magazine and Money & Life as well as in numerous fashion catalogue books and advertisements. She is currently represented by Ace Models.

== Job Appearances ==
- BOSS
- Life & Style
- Men Magazine
- Money & Life
