= Charles-Hubert Perrault =

Canadian businessman (1922–2019)

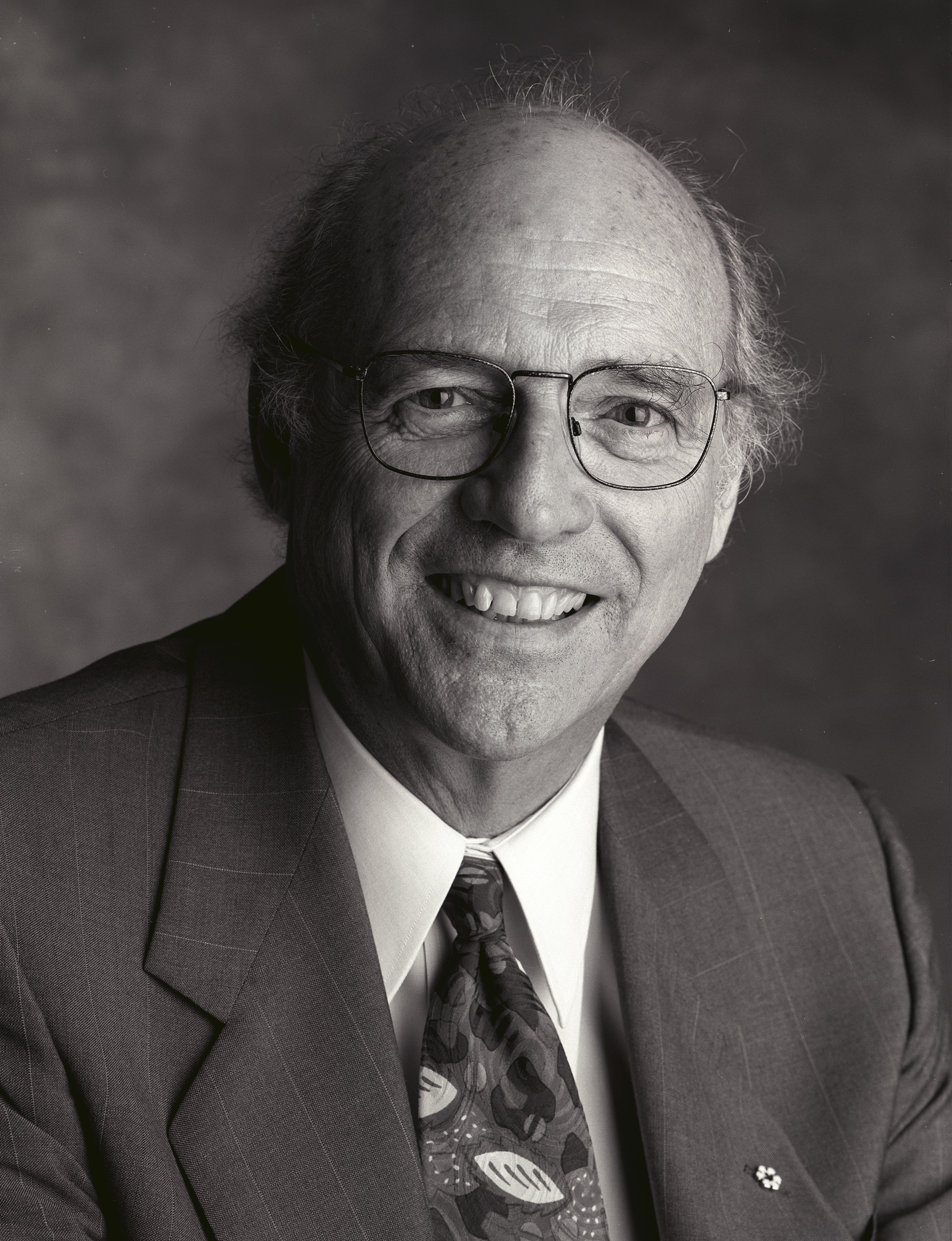
- Born: September 22, 1922; Montreal, Quebec, Canada
- Died: August 31, 2019 (aged 96); Sherbrooke, Quebec, Canada
- Education: McGill University
- Occupation: Businessman
- Known for: Former President and Chairman of the Board of Casavant Frères, Ltée; Founding President of the Conseil du Patronat du Québec
- Awards: Member of the Order of Canada (1987)

Charles-Hubert Perrault (September 22, 1922 – August 31, 2019) was a Canadian businessman.

== Biography ==
Born in Montreal, Charles-Hubert Perrault was the son of Jean-Julien Perrault, architect, and Laurette Beaubien. Perrault descended from a long line of architects, including his great-grandfather, Henri-Maurice Perrault (1828–1903), his great-uncle Maurice Perrault, and his grandfather, Joseph Perrault (1866–1923). His mother, Laurette Beaubien, was the daughter of Joseph Beaubien, longtime mayor of Outremont, and the granddaughter of Louis Beaubien, minister of colonization and one of the founders from the city of Outremont.

== Early years ==
After studying metallurgy at McGill University, he served in the Royal Canadian Electrical and Mechanical Engineering Corps in Europe then as an engineer at several companies, among others Alcan and at QIT Fer et Titane.

== Casavant Frères ==
Since its founding in 1879, Casavant Frères of St-Hyacinthe only manufactured electro-mechanical organs according to an artistic conception dating from the 19th century. From the 1950s on, there was a revival of interest, initiated in Europe, for mechanical organs designed in the 18th century, and for which was written the music of the great Baroque composers, such as Johann Sebastian Bach and Dietrich Buxtehude. This artistic reform was adopted by young organists from Quebec (e.g., Gaston Arel, Raymond Daveluy, and Bernard Lagacé) who convinced administrators of three important churches of Montreal to entrust to the German Rudolf von Beckerath the making of their instruments.

Perrault, who had joined Casavant in 1956 as production manager, convinced the board that despite the commercial successes of the 1950s, the artistic direction of the company needed to be changed urgently. Under his management and that of its new artistic director, Lawrence Phelps, Casavant adapted to the reform and, by 1969, 20% of its new instruments were mechanical and the company remains the most important organ builder in North America. Perrault was appointed president in 1961 and chairman of the board in 1966, a position he held until the sale of Casavant in 1976.

== Conseil du patronat du Québec ==
Starting in 1963, at the suggestion of the Government of Quebec under the Prime Minister Jean Lesage, employers' organizations in Quebec came together under the aegis of a new federation, the Conseil du patronat du Québec or Quebec Employers Council. Perrault participated in the gestation of the CPQ and became its founding president from 1969 to 1976· . During his mandate, the CPQ became involved in a number of issues whose progress had been delayed by the lack of coordination of Quebec companies vis-à-vis the provincial government and the labor unions. Among the most important were the debates on the language of education and of work, the reform of unemployment insurance, the ban on scabs in the event of a strike, the development of hydroelectric facilities at James Bay and the War Measures Act that followed the October Crisis of 1970· .

== Perconsult ==
In 1975, he founded Perconsult, a consulting firm specializing in human relations, which helped companies meet their obligations under the new Bill 101 concerning the use of the French language in Quebec.

== Aluminerie Alouette ==
A consortium led by the Société Générale de Financement and grouping Austria Metall, Hoogoovens, Kobe Steel, Marubeni and VAW, announced in 1989 the launch of Aluminerie Alouette and the construction of a plant in Sept-Îles, aiming to produce 215,000 tonnes of aluminum per year. Construction began in September and Perrault was appointed chairman of the board on February 20, 1990. He announced in June that because of the discovery of pockets of clay in a soil that was believed to be rock, and of the increase in international demand for building materials, the cost of the plant would rise from $1.25 billion to $1.4 billion, and its opening could be delayed for a year. The future of the project was called into question. On August 5, he announced that the partners had agreed to continue the project but with a simpler technical plan and a two-month postponement of operations. A new president, David Chen, was appointed. The first electrolysis cell started on May 31, 1992, allowing for the inauguration of the plant by the prime ministers Brian Mulroney and Robert Bourassa in September. Perrault left the board in 1993. Alouette, after a second phase of construction completed in 2005, now produces 600,000 tonnes per year and is the largest aluminum smelter in America.

== Public service ==
Throughout his career, Perrault was active in organizations involved in economic matters and labor relations. In Quebec, he was one of the first members of the Conseil d'Orientation Economique from 1961-68. He was member of the Quebec Royal Commission on Taxation 1963-65 and of the Advisory Council on Labor and Manpower 1969-76.

In Ottawa, he was member of the Economic Council of Canada 1868-1976, and of the Advisory Council to the Minister of Industry, Trade and Commerce 1969-71, and the Canada Labor Relations Council 1975-76.

He served on the board of governors of McGill University 1981-91 and of the C.D. Howe Institute.

He was a member of the board of several Canadian companies, including Abitibi-Consolidated, Aluminerie Alouette, Avon Canada, Morgan Bank, BP Canada, Canron, Celanese Canada, Chemcell, Gaz Metropolitain, Innovitech, Molson Brewery, Montrusco, North American Life Insurance, Nortel, Oshawa Group, Schroders Investments, Quaker Oats and SNC-Lavalin.

== Honors ==
He was elected member of the Order of Canada in 1987
