= Kim France =

American editor, journalist, and author

- Born: United States
- Citizenship: United States
- Occupations: Journalist, editor, author
- Writing career
- Language: English
- Genre: Journalism

Kim France is an American editor, journalist, and author. She was the founding editor of Lucky, an award-winning national magazine that folded in 2015, and is the author of The Lucky Shopping Manual (2003), which has 150,000 copies in print, according to its publisher, Dutton.

== Background and education ==
France, the daughter of Hugh Robert France and Eve Linda Rubin, is originally from Houston, Texas and a graduate of Oberlin College.

== Career ==
Before Lucky, France served as editor-at-large for Spin and deputy editor of New York, and had been a staff writer for Sassy, Elle, and 7 Days. She has written articles for Vibe, Rolling Stone, Allure, The New York Times Book Review, Mademoiselle, Harper's Bazaar, The New York Times Magazine, and The Village Voice.

== Lucky ==
France has been called "the shopping guru and media revolutionary" behind Lucky. She is the subject of many articles herself, including "Kim France Got Lucky - Magazine, That Is," at H-Texas Online. In 2004, Crain's New York Business named France a "Rising Star" in its "40 Under 40" issue; Crain's called France "the hottest new editor at Condé Nast Publications, where she turned Lucky into the publisher’s fastest-growing launch ever." That same year, New York magazine named France one of "the most powerful people in New York". While the New York Post called France one of the 50 most powerful Women in New York.

In January 2012, Women's Wear Daily revealed that France was joining Martha Stewart, Bobby Flay, and Cynthia Rowley at the consumer website OpenSky.

== Post-Lucky ==
Since leaving her position at Lucky, Kim France has begun regularly publishing articles to her blog titled, "Girls of a Certain Age". France regularly posts her thoughts and opinions on subjects such as fashion, interior design, and more. In 2021, France partnered with writer and editor Jennifer Romolini on a podcast for women over 40 called "Everything is Fine." On the show, France and Romolini interview middle-aged women such as New York Times best selling essayist Samantha Irby among a myriad of other influential women and discuss everything from menopause to ageism, waning ambition to mid-life style, beauty, and sex.
