= Perot de Garbalei =

French poet

Perot de Garbalei, flourished circa 1300, is only known as the author of one poem. Nothing is known about his life. The 935 verses were written in the French language. They describe the geography of the world. All the geographic information is found in well-known earlier Latin works.

Perot states that he "read a very learned book in Latin which many clerics said could not be translated into vernacular rhyme". He took up the challenge as he was confident of obtaining the gratitude of both clerics and laymen, stating that "Purceo s'en est par foi/Perot de Garbalei/Entremis, pur aver/Le gre e le voler/E de clers e de lais".

On the basis of his name, he may have been from a location called Galbally, i.e. if Garbalei is a variant of Galbalei. Several villages or townships in south Wexford bear the name Galbally. As he was a translator from Latin, he may have been a cleric - there was a Franciscan house at Galbally. The Divisiones Mundi is a poem of 935 six-syllable lines in couplets, and a concise survey of world geography, its sources being De Philosophia Mundi and De Imagine Mundi.
