= Pierre Perrault (scientist) =

Hydrologist

Pierre Perrault (c. 1608, in Paris – 1680, in Paris) was a Receiver General of Finances for Paris and later a scientist who developed the concept of the hydrological cycle. He and Edme Mariotte were primarily responsible for making hydrology an experimental science.

== Life ==
Perrault grew up in a bourgeois family, had at least seven siblings, and probably lived all his life in Paris. Little is known about his life, despite the fame of some of his younger brothers. These include Claude, an architect of part of the Louvre Palace; Nicholas, a doctor of theology known for his denunciation of the Jesuits; and Charles, author of Tales of Mother Goose.

Perrault was trained as a lawyer, and in 1654 purchased the position of Receiver General of Finances for Paris. This post involved collecting taxes for Louis XIV, and he received a percentage of the taxes he collected. This position ruined him when Louis XIV chose to calm rebellious taxpayers by granting a remission of all taxes that were still owed after 10 years. Pierre had used some of his tax receipts for 1664 to pay creditors, and when he could not deliver the money to the royal treasury, he was forced into bankruptcy.

After the bankruptcy Perrault became an amateur scientist and focused his attention on the origin of springs. The result of his labor was his book de l'Origine des fontaines (On the Origin of Fountains), published anonymously in 1674 and dedicated to his friend Christiaan Huygens.

== On the Origin of Springs ==
In the millennia before Perrault published his book, most natural philosophers asserted that there was not enough precipitation to account for the flow of rivers and springs. Aristotle claimed that most of the water came from caverns in which air was transformed into water. Many others argued that seawater entered caverns, was heated until it rose as vapor, then condensed and fed springs, which fed rivers. Although some philosophers such as Anaxagoras had more realistic models of the hydrologic cycle, the weight of authority was behind the more fanciful theories.

Perrault devoted the first part of his book, On the Origin of Springs, to analyzing the ideas of his predecessors and what he called the "Common Opinion", rejecting most of it. He estimated the flow in the Seine River and compared it with rainfall in the watershed, showing that the rainfall was easily enough to account for the flow in the river. This conclusion was later supported by a more rigorous quantitative analysis published by Edme Mariotte.

With a series of experiments, Perrault showed that rain does not penetrate the soil beyond about 2 feet (0.61 m). Thus, most of the rain that falls does not go into springs. Perrault developed the theory of the hydrologic cycle, correctly accounting for the roles of evaporation, transpiration, throughflow, and surface runoff.
