= Katia Kuethe =

German-born creative director

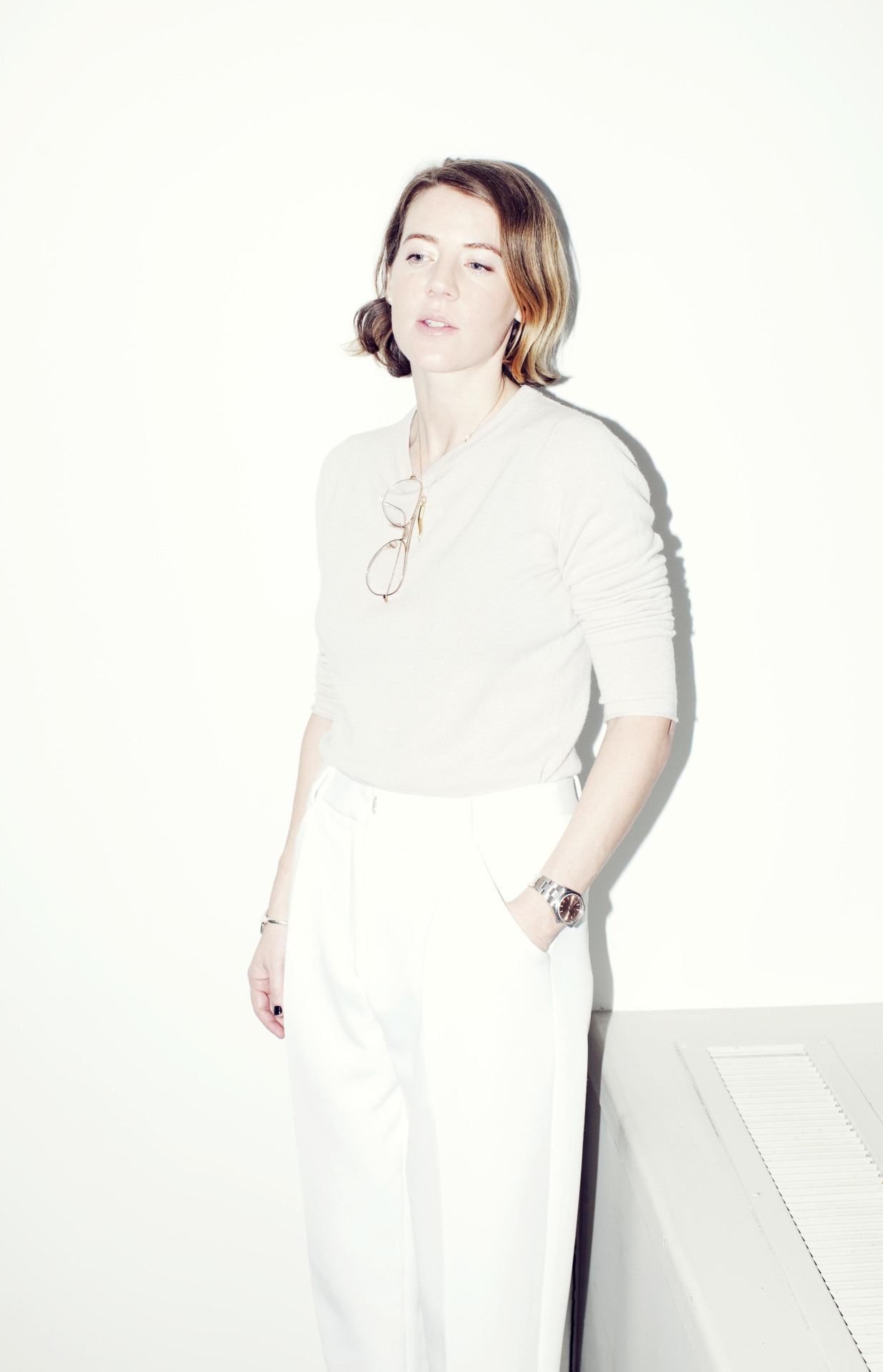
- Born: Stuttgart, Baden-Württemberg, West Germany
- Education: State Academy of Fine Arts Stuttgart
- Occupation: Creative director
- Years active: 2002–present
- Website: katiakuethe.com

Katia Kuethe is a German-born creative director living and working in the United States.

== Early life and education ==
She was born in Stuttgart, Germany and graduated from State Academy of Fine Arts Stuttgart with a degree in graphic and editorial design.

== Career ==
In 2002, Kuethe moved to New York City and took a job at Lloyd & Co. as Senior Art Director, working with brands like Gucci and Yves Saint Laurent. This was followed by stints as Art Director at J. Crew and Ann Taylor, leading to a job at Teen Vogue as Creative Director.

Kate Spade being in the midst of a "refresh" in 2012, hired Kuethe as Senior Director of Creative, after leaving her job at Teen Vogue. In 2013, Katia followed her time at Kate Spade as Creative Director of Lucky Magazine. Shortly after Lucky went out of print in 2015, Katia assumed the role of Creative Director at Abercrombie & Fitch. At Abercrombie, Kuethe worked on 2015 winter campaigns for A+F, as well as sister brand Hollister. In 2018, started work for Bergdorf Goodman as Consulting Creative Director, this led to following work with Bergdorf's parent company Neiman Marcus.

== Honors and awards ==
- Awarded Merit by Graphis for Kate Space 20th Anniversary identity
- FIFI Award Women's Private Label Victoria's Secret – So In Love
- Graphis Gold “Brochures 06” - Uniqlo Paper Nr. 1
- Graphis Gold “Letterhead 07” - Blondie Identity (custom lettered logo, letterhead system)
- ONE Show Silver Pen Award, Big Magazine #55 Art Director’s Club New York Merit Award, E&A – The Glossy Zine Issue 4 F/W 2006
- Society of Publication Designers Merit Winner, Big Magazine #55

== Personal life ==
Kuethe lives in New York City with her son Paz.
