= Katia Caré =

- Alma mater: Conservatoire à rayonnement régional de Versailles
- Occupation: Medievalist, singer, conductor
- Position held: founder member

Katia Caré (born in the 20th century) is a French medievalist, professor of medieval music, singer, and musical conductor. She is the founder of the Ensemble Perceval as a soloist and she established the Ensemble Ligeriana in 1998, which was initially an all-female group dedicated to the reconstruction of medieval chants, before gradually opening itself to male artists too, according to the scope of the projects.

Alongside Guy Robert and Marcel Pérès, she holds a significant position in the French musicological study of medieval songs.

== Biography ==
Caré first studied the flute in New York City, then returned to France and joined the conservatory in Versailles. At the same time, she took singing lessons with Xavier le Maréchal. She later taught at the conservatory herself and attended classes with Marcel Pérès to train in the reading of ancient musical notations, before joining the Ensemble Perceval.

In 1994, Caré performed at the chapel of the confrérie des Pénitents-Gris with the Ensemble Perceval and Guy Robert (1943–2020). At that time, she was a soloist with the Ensemble, as well as a musicologist and historian. She also became a lecturer at the University of Nantes and developed a particular interest in historical reconstructions of medieval music.

In 1998 or 2000, she founded the Ensemble Ligeriana, named in homage to the département that had supported the project. Initially, the ensemble focused on medieval female polyphony before welcoming men into its ranks in 2008. In 2001, after reconstructing the chant from a manuscript originating from the Cartoixa d'Escaladei, Caré performed with Ligeriana at the Abbey of Saint-Gildas de Rhuys.

In 2002, she participated with the Ensemble Perceval in the Namur Music Festival. Later that same year, she released the second album of Ligeriana, recorded at the Fontevraud Abbey, titled Iberica, as it is a compilation of medieval chants from the Iberian Peninsula. For this project, an all-female choir was necessary, given that the nuns sang and still sing among women and therefore have specific chants and vocal traditions. That same year, Caré and Robert participated with Perceval in performances of "Bela Domna, chants of women from the 12th and 13th centuries" at the Chapel of Notre-Dame-des-Ardilliers in Saumur, where she took care of the singing, gemshorn, and percussion. The two artists were then residing in the Saumur area.

These performances led to the release of an album, which was published the following year. In 2004, Katia Caré released a solo album, accompanied only by Gisela Bellsola, featuring works centered around the general theme of "abandonment in the songs of women, trobairitz from the Occitan region or trouvères from the langue d'oïl". In 2005, she participated with Ligeriana in performances in Rezé. In 2007, with Perceval, she gave a concert themed around the legend of Tristan and Iseult. Overall, she undertook numerous tours, which were praised by critics for their "light and colorful interpretation of rare manuscripts as well as [her] documentary and musical interest".

In 2016, she focused on the topic of pilgrimage songs with Ligeriana.

== Analysis ==
The musicologist Édith Weber described some of her research and findings for the album "Carmina Carolingiana" by Ligeriana:

Concerned with authenticity, Katia Caré consulted Christophe Tellart, who provided the Ensemble with valuable linguistic advice for the pronunciation of Carolingian Latin according to Germanic customs. Her Ensemble Ligeriana successfully recreates these formidable carmina carolingiana, whose interpretation benefited from the excellent acoustics of the Royal Abbey of Fontevraud, with resonant effects. The performers stand out for their vocal homogeneity and accuracy, their timbres, and the balance between voices and instruments; they deserve credit for creating a beautiful Defense and Illustration of the repertoire in use during the 'Carolingian Renaissance.'
