= Perot =

Perot may refer to:

== People ==
- Ross Perot (1930–2019), United States business leader and presidential candidate
- H. Ross Perot, Jr. (born 1958), United States businessman and son of Ross Perot
- Alfred Pérot (1863–1925), French physicist
- William Bennett Perot (1791–1871), early postmaster of Bermuda; see Perot Island, Bermuda
- Perot de Garbalei (fl. 1300), author of Divisiones Mundi

== Other uses ==
- Perot Systems, an information technology company led by Ross and H. Ross Perot
- Perot Museum of Nature and Science, Dallas, Texas, United States

== See also ==
- Perrot (disambiguation)
- Perreau, a surname
