= I Am Golden =

2022 children's book by Eva Chen and illustrated by Sophie Diao

- Author: Eva Chen
- Illustrator: Sophie Diao
- Language: English
- Genre: Picture book
- Publisher: Feiwel & Friends/MacMillian Publisher
- Publication date: February 1, 2022
- Publication place: United States
- Pages: 40
- ISBN: 978-1-250-84205-3

I Am Golden is a children's picture book by Eva Chen and illustrated by Sophie Diao. It tells the story of Mei, the daughter of Chinese immigrants to New York, who is shown to be a bridge connecting her parents to their new home. The book was published on February 1, 2022, by Feiwel & Friends. This is the first time Chen and Diao, both daughters to Chinese immigrants, collaborated, with their book releasing at number 8 on The New York Times Best Seller list.

== Reception ==
Publishers Weekly called Chen's story a "richly metaphoric celebration of Chinese American identity". In their starred review, they also praised Diao's illustrations, noting it has "recognizably Chinese cues" which enriches the story of immigration and adaptation being told. Writing for The Booklist, Van McGary called it a "gorgeous picture book" that "exudes joy and celebration of identity". McGary praises the Diao's "rich tones and golden hues", as well as Chen's "lyrical writing", and expounds on the book's themes of self-love and identity.

Kirkus Reviews gave I Am Golden a starred review and praised the story and its morals. They commented on the second-person narrative, which "adds intimacy to the lyrical text" and called the book a "shining affirmation of Chinese American identity."
