= Ben Perreau =

British journalist (born 1980)

- Born: Ben Michael Perreau; 1980 (age 45–46); Taplow, England
- Occupations: Entrepreneur, journalist
- Years active: 2001–present

Ben Michael Perreau (born 1980 in Taplow, England) is a British journalist, radio presenter and entrepreneur who founded Synkio, an online marketplace for licensing music and Gigulate, a music news and concert listings aggregator. Perreau is CEO at Parafoil, a leadership intelligence firm in Los Angeles.

== Life and career ==
Perreau first worked as a radio producer at London's Virgin Radio and a presenter on Liquid London. In 2004 he joined British music magazine NME, where he led the development of music site NME.COM which later became the world's largest music website of its time. In his role as the editor, Perreau worked on introducing new features on the website. Perreau planned for NME.COM to enter the US market by opening offices in Los Angeles and New York. Perreau was named one of the “50 People Shaping Online Journalism″ in 2006 by The Press Gazette.

Perreau edited NME.com until October 2007, when he was succeeded as editor by David Moynihan. He then joined BSkyB where he took up the position of Strategic Director of Content, responsible for Sky's new content division.

In 2009 Perreau founded Gigulate, an automated aggregator for music news and concert listings. By the end of year, he joined Global Radio as Director of Digital content responsible for the group's editorial strategy and content direction. In 2013 he founded Synkio, an online and mobile platform for music and audio licensing.

Perreau is CEO at Parafoil, a leadership intelligence firm in Los Angeles.
