= Katia Beaugeais =

Australian-French composer and saxophonist

Katia Beaugeais is an Australian-French contemporary classical composer based in Sydney. She was born on 9 December 1976.

== Career ==
After learning piano and saxophone from the ages six and twelve respectively, Katia Beaugeais completed a Bachelor of Music Education degree to become a classroom music teacher. She then completed a postgraduate saxophone degree at the Sydney Conservatorium of Music, and began to compose and perform her own work for the first time.

She was awarded a Ph.D. in composition in 2021, and released Breath by Breath, her debut solo album performing her own saxophone compositions. The album was released by ABC Classical, and featured saxophone extended techniques. It was featured on BBC Radio 3 and ABC Radio.

She has collaborated with Australian composers Katy Abbott, Anne Boyd, Bruce Crossman, Rosalind Page, and William Barton.

In 2010 she won the ISCM-IAMIC International Young Composer Award for her 2008 work Sound Box.
