= Charles Perrot (priest) =

French theologian

- Born: Charles Marie Maurice Perrot; 16 February 1929; Gannat
- Died: 11 November 2013 (aged 84); Moulins
- Education: Doctor of Philosophy
- Occupation: Catholic priest (1953–), theologian, biblical scholar, university teacher, priest
- Employer: Catholic University of Lyon (1960–1974); Catholic University of Paris (1970–1994)
- Position held: honorary professor (2005–)

Charles Perrot (16 February 1929 – 11 November 2013) was a French Roman Catholic priest and biblical scholar. He served as honorary professor of New Testament at the Catholic Institute of Paris. A specialist in contemporary Judaism of Jesus, Perrot has been known for his studies of the historical Jesus and the New Testament.

== Education ==
In 1957, he got his PhD with the entitled thesis L'Arrière-plan de la narration synoptique hormis les récits de la Passion et de la Résurrection. Quelques hypothèses de critique littéraire.

== Career ==
In 1953 he was ordained priest in the Diocese of Moulins in Allier, where he served as such and then retired with the function of dean of the cathedral.

Perrot collaborated in the Association catholique française pour l'étude de la Bible. Congrès (1979 Paris, France) Etudes sur la première lettre de Pierre.

C. Perrot is the author of Jésus et l'histoire (Desclée de Brouwer, 1993) which has become a reference book on the historical background of Jesus and the early Judeo-Christians.

In 2005 he became honorary Professor of Exegesis of the New Testament at the Catholic Institute of Paris. There he was one of the biblical scholars with Henri Cazelles, Pierre Grelot, Antoine Vanel, and Jacques Briend. He was a Catholic theologian, having taught for a third of a century at the Catholic Faculties of Lyon (1960–1974) and at the Catholic Institute of Paris (1970–1994).

== Notable works ==
- Perrot, Charles (1973). La Lecture de la Bible dans la synagogue: les anciennes lectures palestiniennes du Shabbat et des fête. Collection Massorah., Série 1, Etudes classiques et textes. Hildesheim, Gerstenberg. ISBN 9783806704389. OCLC 1267770.
- Perrot, Charles (1979). Jésus et l'histoire. Collection "Jésus et Jésus-Christ". Paris: Desclée de Brouwer. ISBN 9782718900568. OCLC 7131782.
- Perrot, Charles (1983). Le retour du Christ. Publications des Facultés universitaires Saint-Louis. Vol. 31. Bruxelles: Publications des Facultés universitaires Saint-Louis. ISBN 978-2802800323. OCLC 299405218.
- Perrot, Charles (September 1988). L'Épître aux Romains. Cahiers Évangile. Vol. 65. Paris: Service biblique Évangile et vie: Éditions du Cerf. OCLC 423517077.
- Perrot, Charles (1988). "The Reading of the Bible in the Ancient Synagogue". The Literature of the Jewish People in the Period of the Second Temple and the Talmud, Volume 1 Mikra: Text, Translation, Reading and Interpretation of the Hebrew Bible in Ancient Judaism and Early Christianity. Compendia Rerum Iudaicarum ad Novum Testamentum. Brill. pp. 137–159. doi:10.1163/9789004275102_005. ISBN 9789004275102.
- Perrot, Charles (1997). Jésus, Christ et Seigneur des premiers chrétiens. Collection "Jésus et Jésus-Christ". Vol. 70. Paris: Desclée de Brouwer. ISBN 9782718909363. OCLC 37331925.
- Perrot, Charles (1998). Jésus. Que sais-je?. Paris: Presses universitaires de France. ISBN 9782130486992. OCLC 39391578.
- Perrot, Charles (2000). Après Jésus. Le ministère chez les premiers chrétiens. Vivre, croire, célébrer.; Recherches.; Vivre, croire, célébrer. Paris: Les Éditions de l'Atelier; Éditions Ouvrières. ISBN 9782708234819. OCLC 299850387.

== Festschrift ==
- Quesnel, Michel; Blanchard, Yves-Marie; Tassin, Claude, eds. (1999). Nourriture et repas dans les milieux juifs et chrétiens de l'antiquité. Mélanges offerts au Professeur Charles Perrot. Lectio Divina. Vol. 178. Paris: Cerf. ISBN 2-204-06247-2.

== Sources ==
- Notice de personne: Perrot, Charles (1929-2013) forme internationale. 2013-11-13 – via BnF Catalogue général.
- "Charles Perrot (1929-2013)". BnF Data.
- Briend, Jacques (2007). Avant Jésus, l'espérance: JJC 93. Jésus et Jésus-Christ. Fleurus. ISBN 9782718907550.
- Société des études juives (France); École pratique des hautes études (France); Section des sciences économiques et sociales; École des hautes études en sciences sociales, eds. (2001). "Professeur Charles Perrot, Paris, Les Editons du Cerf, 1999, 317 pages". Historia judaica. Collection de la Revue des études juives. 160. La Société des Études Juives: 280.
- "Charles Perrot". Éditions du Cerf.
- "Perrot, Charles (1929-2013)". IdRef – Identifiants et référentiels pour l’Enseignement supérieur et la Recherche. 2020-04-21.
- Institute for Scientific Information (Philadelphia), ed. (2000). "Nourishment and repast in the Jewish and Christian milleu of antiquity: Essays in honor of professor Charles Perrot (French) by M. Quesnel, Y.M. Blanchard, C. Tassin. C. Bernas". Current Contents: Arts & Humanities. ISI.
- Lacoste, Jean-Yves, ed. (2005). Encyclopedia of Christian Theology: 3-volume set (reprinted ed.). Routledge. ISBN 9781135456412.
- "Perrot, Charles". Library of Congress.
- "L'exégèse aujourd'hui, lecture to the Carmelite students in Paris le 17 janvier 2005". 2005-03-01.
- "Mort des biblistes Charles Perrot et Jerome Murphy-O'Connor". la-croix.com. 2013-11-12.
- "Charles Perrot". La procure.
- "Perrot, Charles (1929-2013)". Persée.
- Perrot, Charles (1982). Jesús y la historia. Academia Cristiana. Vol. 15. Ediciones Cristiandad. ISBN 9788470573224.
- Sevegrand, Martine (2014). Israël vu par les catholiques français: 1945-1994. Hommes et sociétés. Éditions Karthala. ISBN 9782811112875.
- Studiorum Novi Testimenti Societas, ed. (April 1992). "Membership list, 1992 (Denotes Committee Member)". New Testament Studies. 38 (2). The University Press. doi:10.1017/S0028688500019949.
