= Katia Serra =

Italian footballer

Personal information
- Date of birth: 5 April 1973 (age 53)
- Place of birth: Bologna, Italy
- Height: 1.67 m (5 ft 6 in)
- Position: Midfielder

Senior career*
Years	Team	Apps	(Gls)
1986–1992	Bologna		
1992–1997	Lugo		
1997–1999	Modena		
1999–2002	Foroni Verona		
2002–2003	Lazio		
2003–2004	Bergamo		
2004–2005	Atletico Oristano		
2005	Agliana		
2005–2006	Cervia		
2006–2007	Reggiana		
2007–2008	Trento		
2008–2009	Roma CF		
2010	Levante		

International career
2002–2006	Italy	20	(1)
- * Club domestic league appearances and goals

Katia Serra (born 5 April 1973 in Bologna, Italy) is an Italian former footballer who played as a midfielder. She later became a television football pundit for Rai Sport.

She played for Bologna (1986–1991), Lugo di Ravenna (1994–1997), Modena (1997–1999), Lazio (2002–2003), Bergamo (2003–2004), Atletico Oristano (2004–2005), Agliana and Terme di Cervia (2005–2006), Reggiana (2006–2007), Trento (2007–2008), Roma CF (2008–2009) and Levante (2010).

She won an Italian championship with Modena.

She played 20 matches for Italy national team (the first being on 20 March 2002), scoring one goal.
