= Katia Bertoldi =

Professor in Applied Mechanics

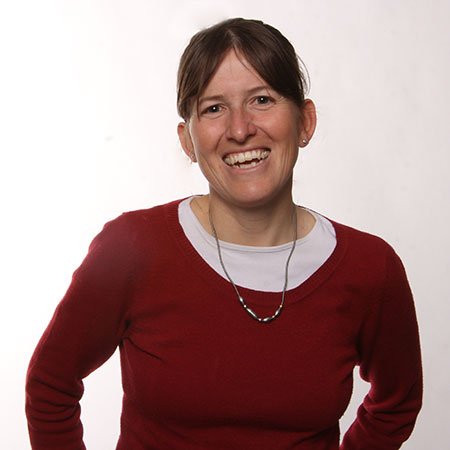
- Photograph of Bertoldi in 2014
- Education: University of Trento (BS); Chalmers University of Technology (MS); University of Trento (PhD)
- Known for: Non-linear behavior of materials and structures
- Awards: ASME Journal of Applied Mechanics Award(2015); National Science Foundation CAREER Award(2011)
- Scientific career
- Fields: Materials science Solid mechanics Elasticity
- Institutions: Harvard

Katia Bertoldi is the William and Ami Kuan Danoff Professor of Applied Mechanics at Harvard University. Her research has been highlighted by many news sources including the BBC, and as of June 2020 had been cited over 11,000 times.

== Early life and education ==
Bertoldi earned master's degrees from the University of Trento in 2002 and from Chalmers University of Technology in 2003, majoring in Structural Engineering Mechanics. Upon earning a Ph.D. degree in Mechanics of Materials and Structures from University of Trento, in 2006, she joined the group of Mary Boyce at MIT as a post-doc. In 2008 Bertoldi became an Assistant Professor in Engineering Technology at University of Twente. In 2010 Bertoldi left the University of Twente to join the School of Engineering and Applied Sciences at Harvard University where she established the Bertoldi group focused on the study of the mechanics of materials and structures.

== Career ==
Bertoldi’s research contributes to the design of materials with a carefully designed meso-structure that leads to novel effective behavior at the macroscale. Bertoldi investigates both mechanical and acoustic properties of such structured materials, with a particular focus on harnessing instabilities and strong geometric non-linearities to generate new modes of functionality. Since the properties of the designed materials are primarily governed by the geometry of the structure (as opposed to constitutive ingredients at the material level), the principles Bertoldi discovers are universal and can be applied to systems over a wide range of length scales.

== Selected publications ==
- Pneumatic Networks for Soft Robotics that Actuate Rapidly
- Topological Phononic Crystals with One-Way Elastic Edge Waves
- 3D Soft Metamaterials with Negative Poisson's Ratio

== Awards and honors ==
Bertoldi is the recipient of the National Science Foundation CAREER Award(2011) and of the American Society of Mechanical Engineers Hughes Young Investigator Award (2014). In 2019, she became a Fellow of the American Physical Society in their Division of Soft Matter. and has won awards in undergraduate teaching excellence. Bertoldi also serves as an Associate Editor for the journal Extreme Mechanics Letters.
