= Claude Perrault =

French architect (1613–1688)

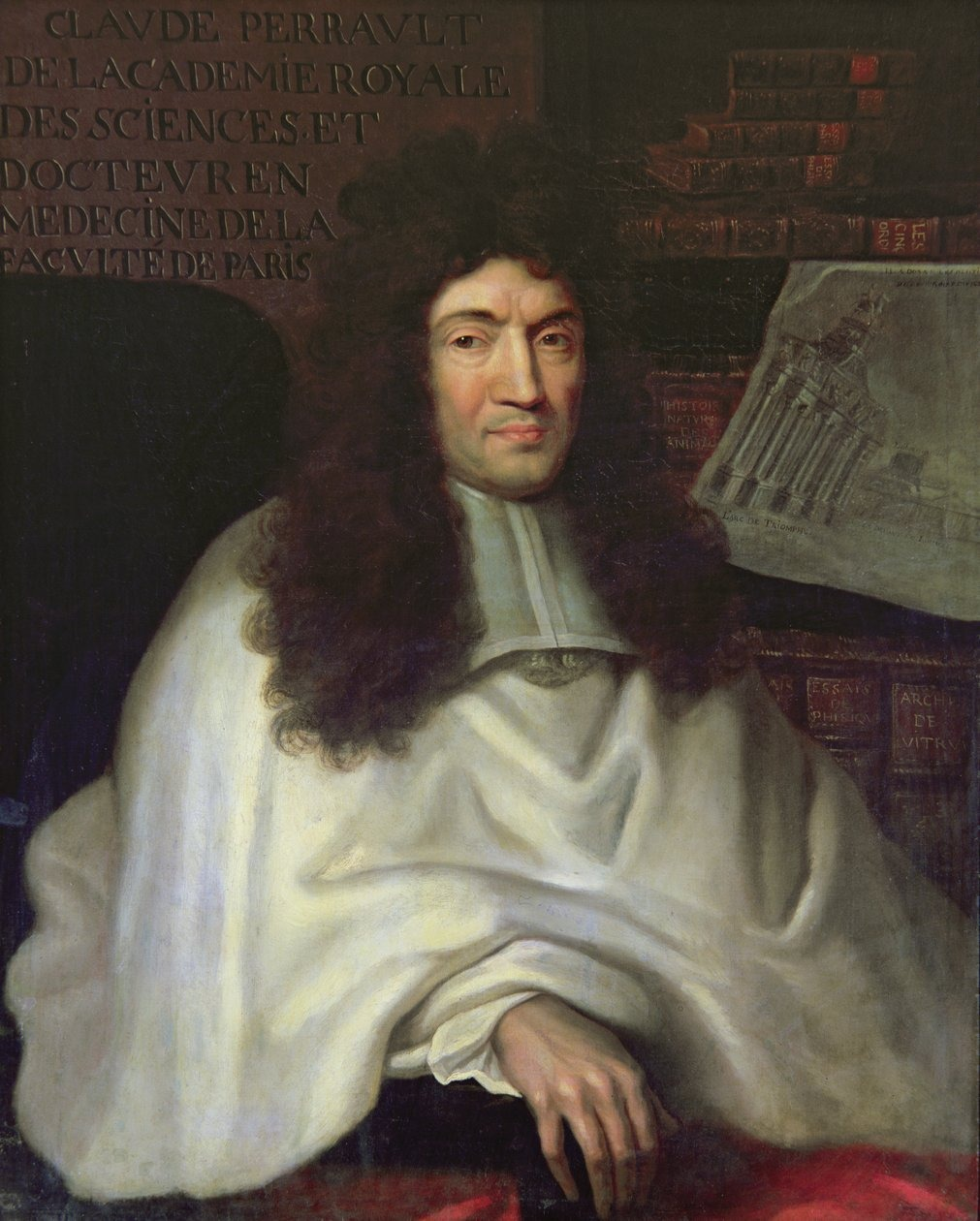
- 17th century portrait of Perrault
- Born: 25 September 1613; Paris
- Died: 9 October 1688 (aged 75); Paris
- Education: Doctor of Medicine
- Alma mater: University of Paris
- Occupations: architect, physician, writer
- Notable work: East façade of the Louvre
- Relatives: Charles Perrault (brother); Pierre Perrault (brother)

Claude Perrault (French pronunciation: [klod pɛʁo]; 25 September 1613 – 9 October 1688) was a French physician and amateur architect, best known for his participation in the design of the east façade of the Louvre in Paris. He also designed the Paris Observatory and was an anatomist and author who wrote treatises on architecture, physics, and natural history.

His brother, Charles Perrault, is remembered as the classic reteller of the old story of Cinderella among other fables.

== Biography ==
Perrault was born and died in Paris.

As physician and natural philosopher, who received a medical degree from the University of Paris in 1642, Perrault became one of the first members of the French Academy of Sciences when it was founded in 1666.

A committee commissioned by Louis XIV, the Petit Conseil, comprising Louis Le Vau, Charles Le Brun, and Perrault, designed the east façade of the Louvre. It was begun in 1667 and was essentially complete in 1674. By 1680, Louis XIV had abandoned the Louvre and focused his attention on the Palace of Versailles. The wing behind the east façade was not finished until the 19th century with the advent of Napoleon. The definitive design of the east façade is attributed to Perrault, who made the final alterations needed to accommodate a decision to double the width of the south wing. He also created projects for the joining of the Louvre with the Tuileries Palace and may have devised the use of iron tie rods behind the entablature of the east façade in order to solve engineering problems arising from forces causing stress in the masonry.

Projects for the Louvre

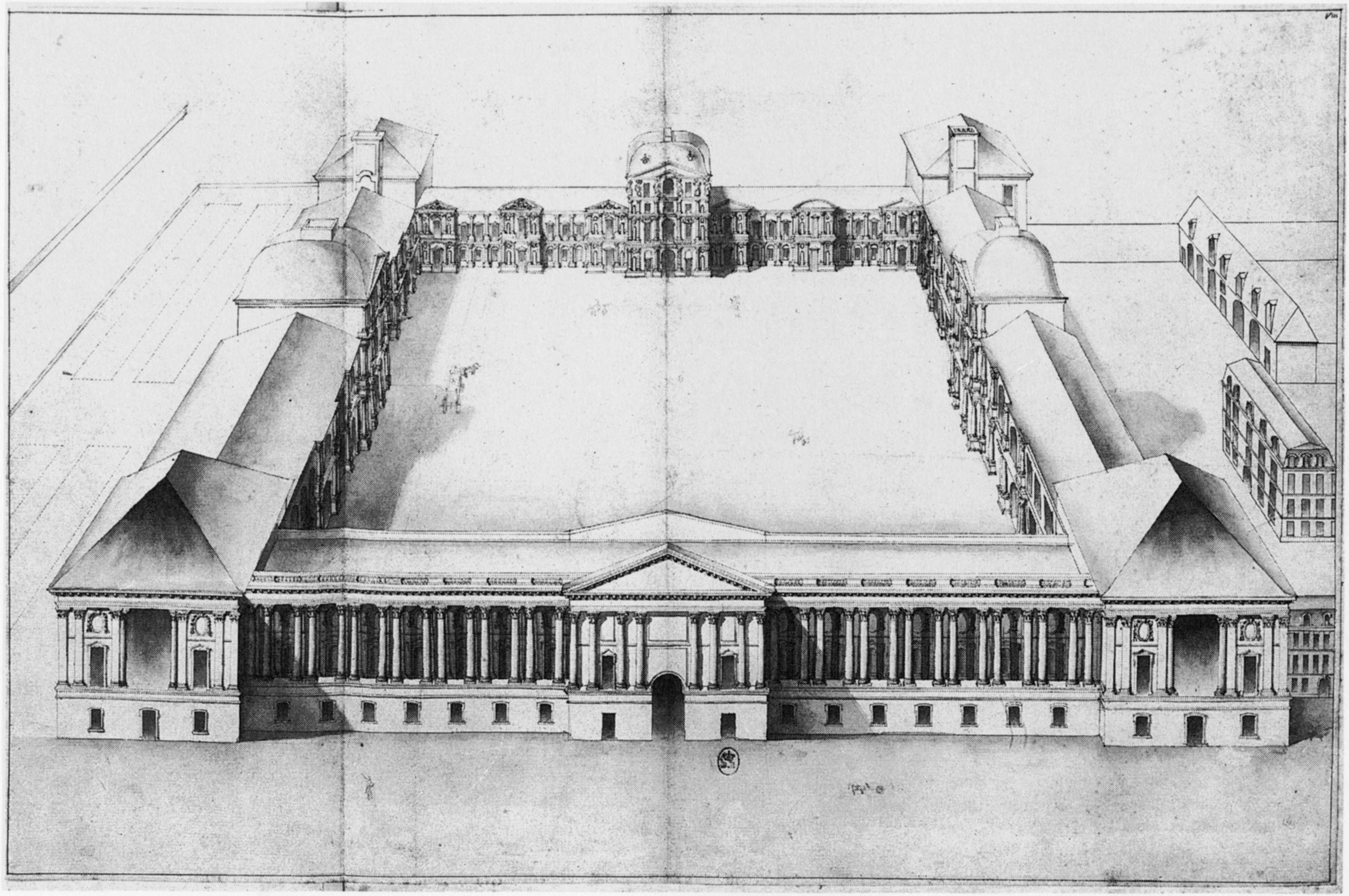
Drawing of 1668, attributed to Perrault, showing a design for the east façade of the Louvre

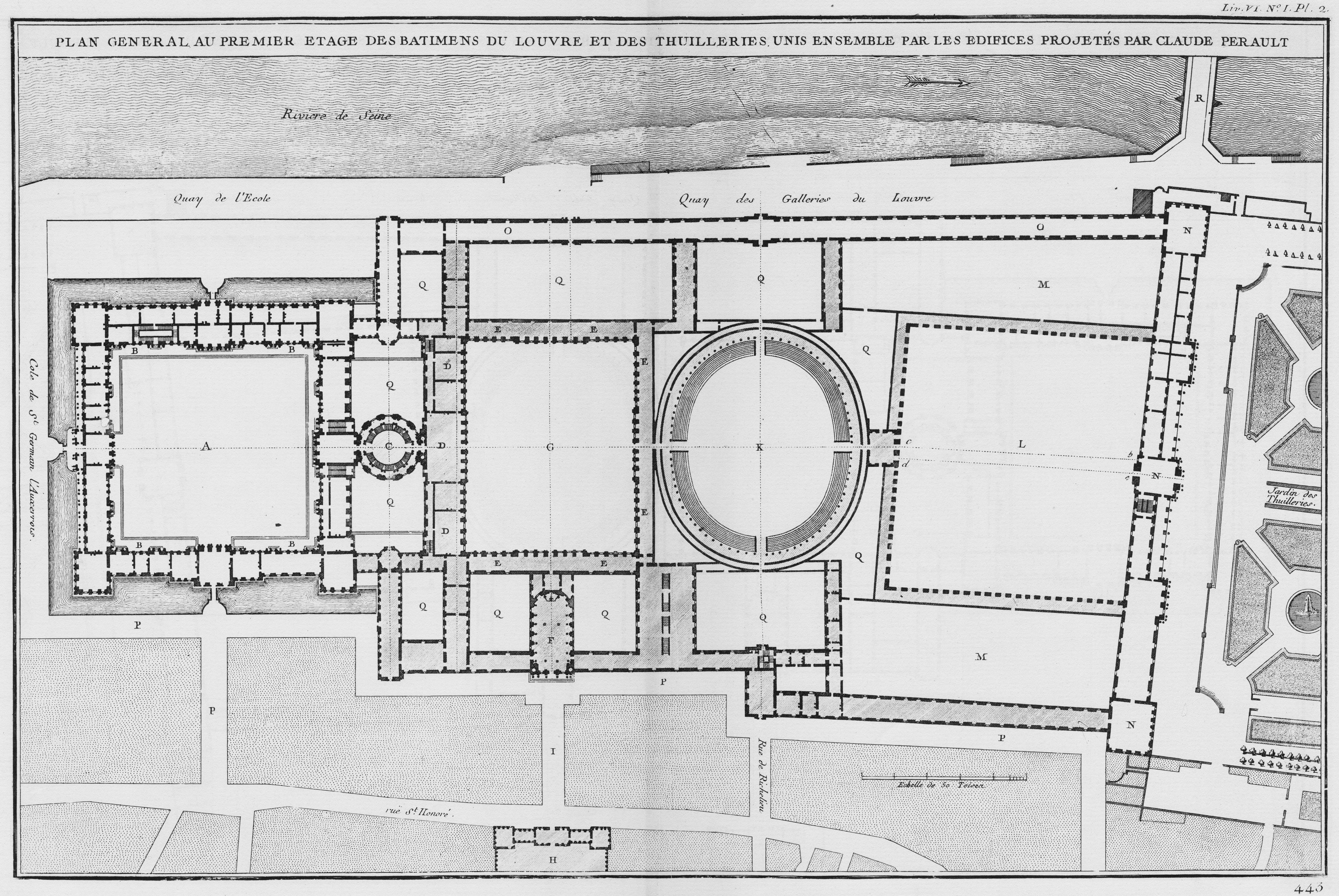
General plan of Perrault's second project for the joining of the Louvre and the Tuileries, engraved by Jacques-François Blondel

Perrault designed the Paris Observatory (1667–1669), a research institute of the Académie des Sciences. His design for a triumphal arch on Rue St-Antoine was preferred over the competing designs of Le Brun and Le Vau, but was only partly executed in stone. When the arch was taken down in the 19th century, it was found that he had devised a means of interlocking the stones, without mortar, so that it had become an inseparable mass. He also created a design (unexecuted) which used free-standing columns for the reconstruction of the church of Sainte-Geneviève in Paris.

Other architectural designs

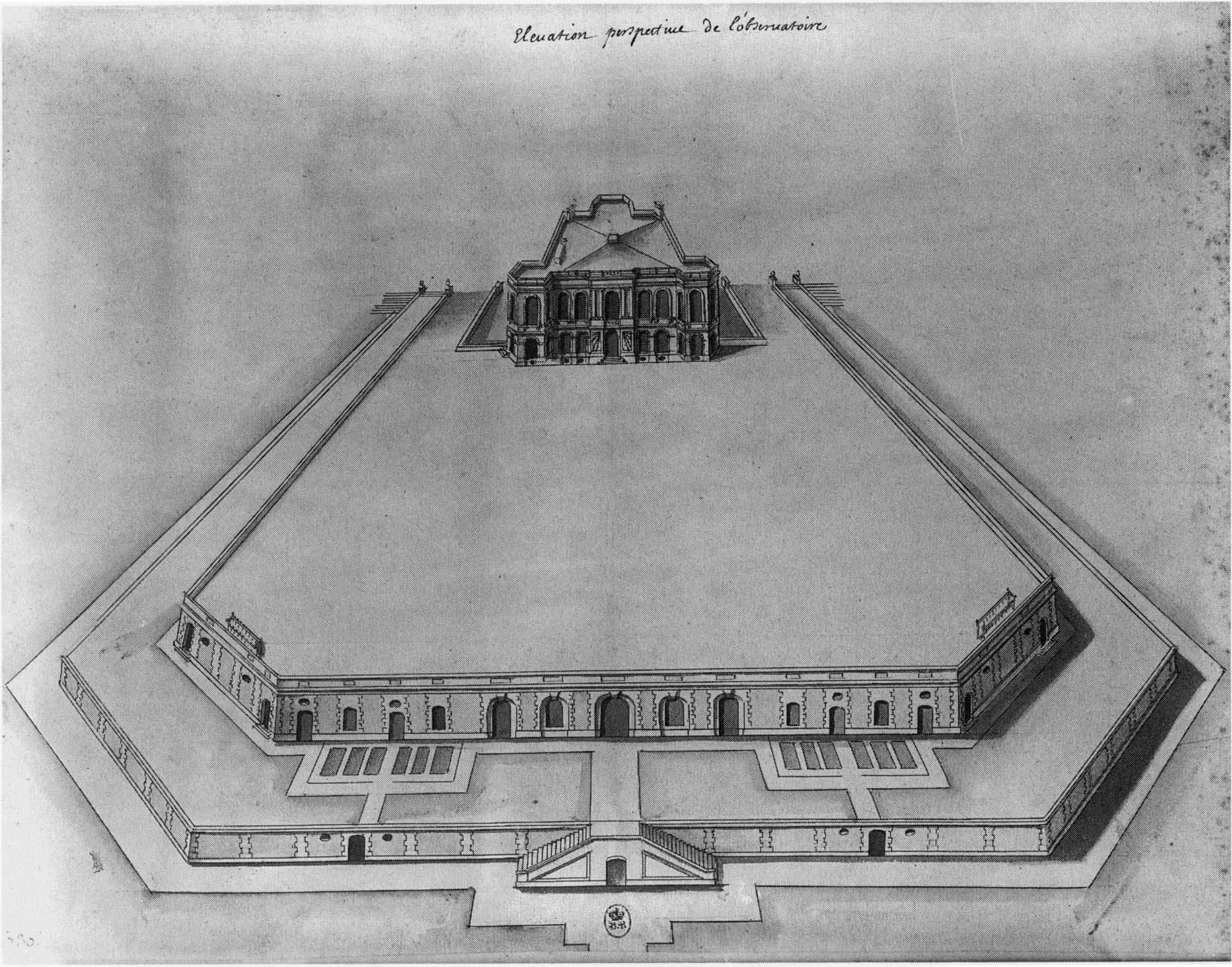
Bird's-eye view of the Paris Observatory, 1667 drawing by Perrault

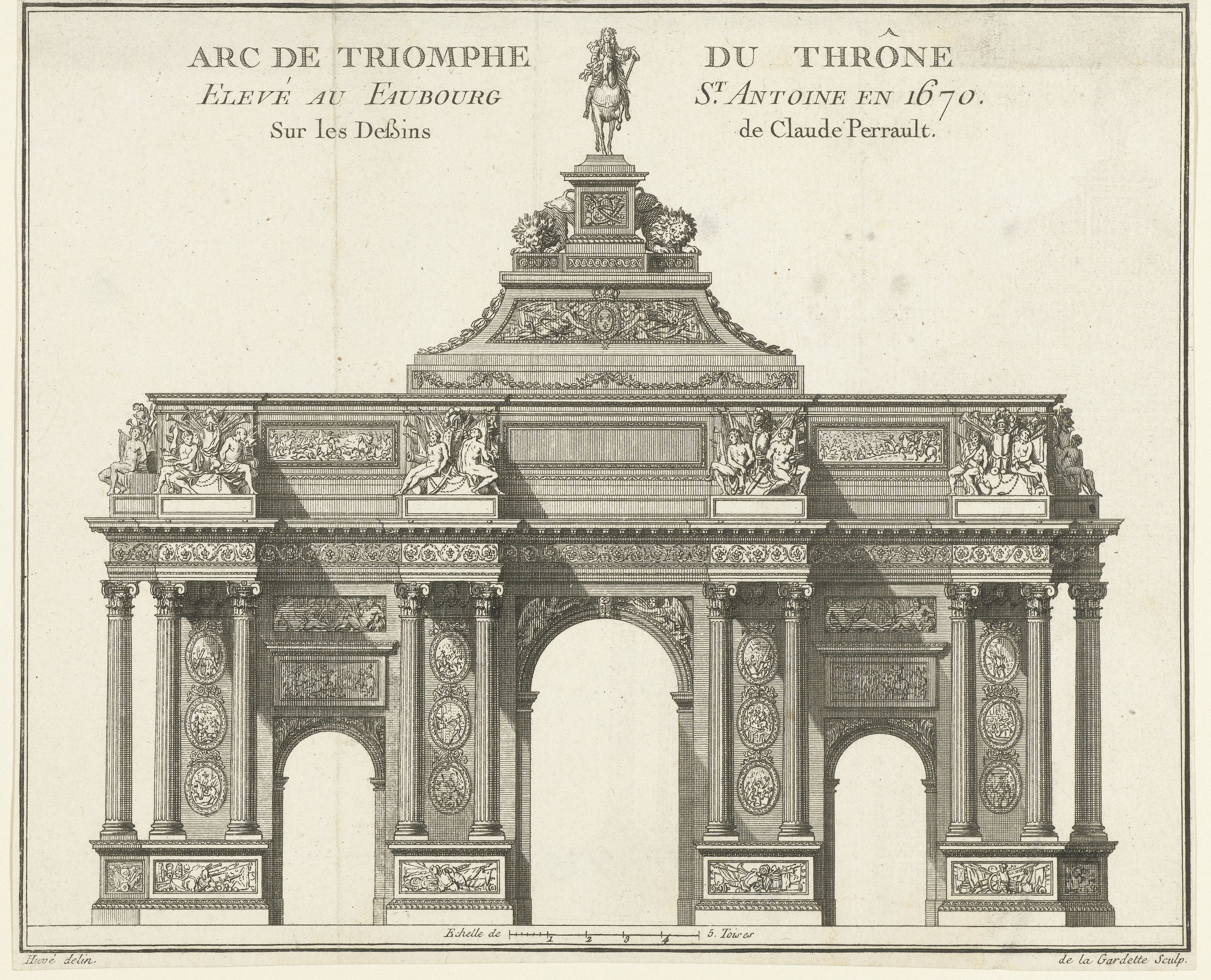
Design for the Arc de Triomphe du Thrône on the Rue Saint-Antoine, 1670

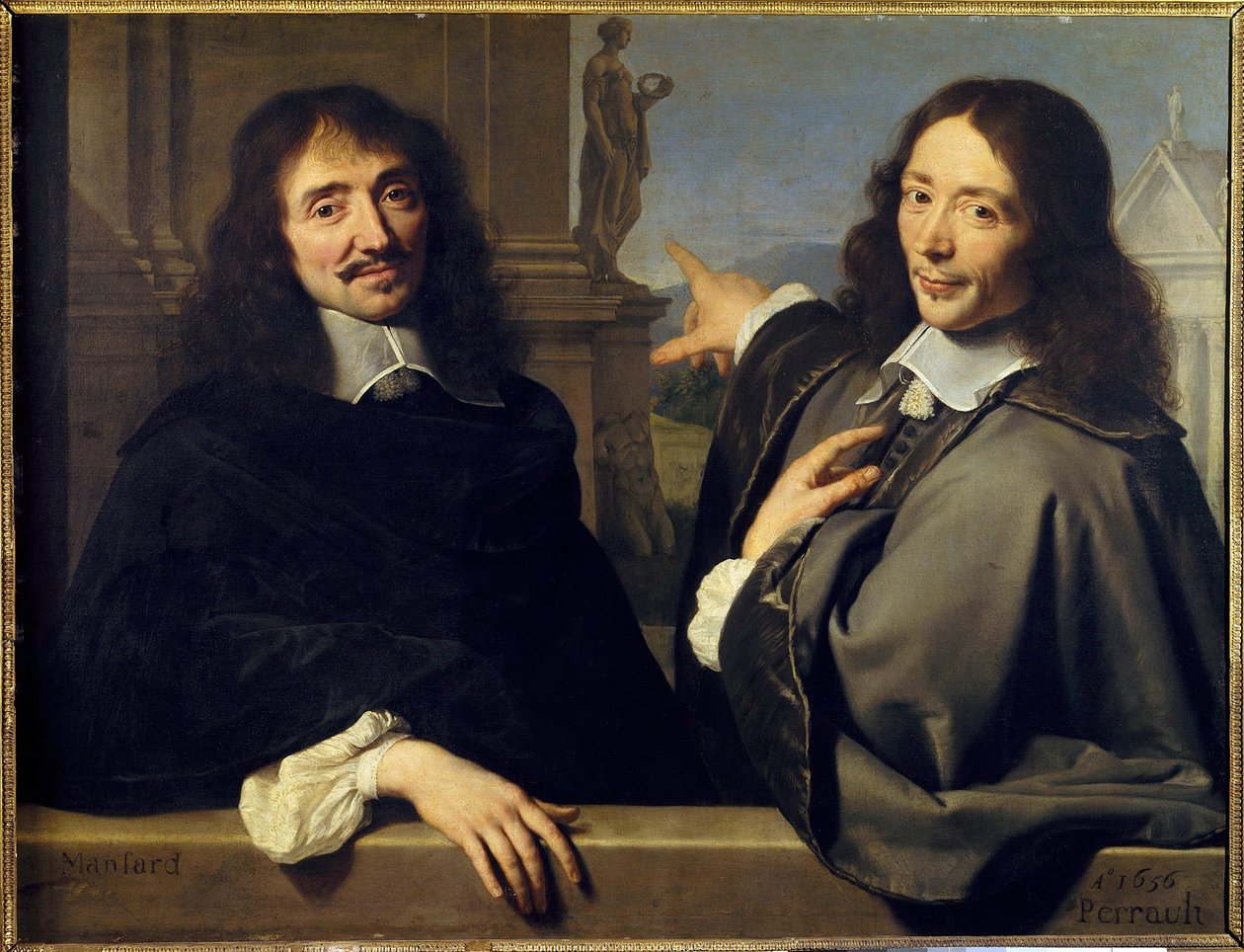
A double portrait of François Mansart and Claude Perrault

Aside from his participation in the design of the Louvre, he became well known for his translation into French of the ten books of Vitruvius, the only surviving Roman work on architecture. Begun at the instigation of Colbert, it was published, with Perrault's annotations, in 1673. His treatise on the five classical orders of architecture followed in 1683.

In addition, he made a valuable contribution in acoustics. His treatise on sound was a part of the book Oeuvres diverses de Physique et de Mecanique. In his later book, he treats such subjects as sound media, sources of sound and sound receivers. In musical acoustics, he noted the importance of vibration on consonance and dissonance. His study "De la Musique des Anciens" in the Oeuvres diverses discussed how combinations of notes yields harmony. It also contains critical examinations of old manuscripts on European music.

== Written works ==
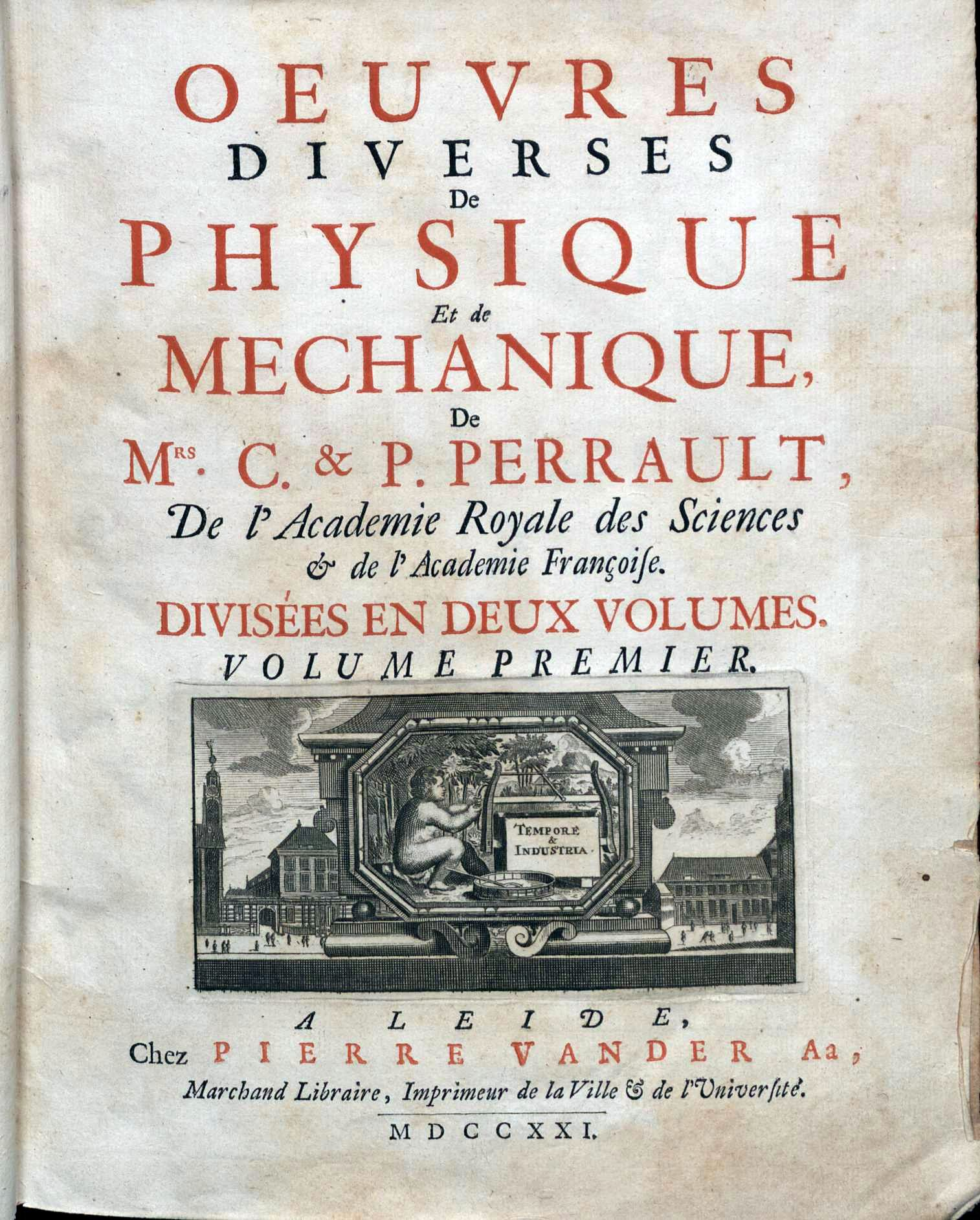
Oeuvres diverses de physique et de mechanique, 1721

- Les dix livres d'architecture de Vitruve, corrigez et traduits nouvellement en françois avec des notes et des figures. Paris, Coignard, 1673.
- Mémoires pour servir à l’histoire naturelle des animaux, 1676 (Memoirs for a natural history of animals: containing the anatomical descriptions of several creatures dissected by the Royal Academy of Sciences at Paris).
- Essais de Physique, ou receuil de plusieurs traitez touchant les choses naturelles, 4 volumes. Paris, Coignard, 1680–1688.
- Ordonnance des cinq espèces de colonnes selon la méthode des anciennes. Paris, Coignard, 1683.
- Ordonnance for the five kinds of columns after the method of the Ancients, translated by Indra Kagis McEwen with an introduction by Alberto Pérez-Gómez. Santa Monica, California: Getty Center for the History of Art and the Humanities, 1993.
- Oeuvres diverses de physique et de mechanique (in French). Vol. 1. Leiden: Pieter van der Aa (1.). 1721.
- Oeuvres diverses de physique et de mechanique (in French). Vol. 2. Leiden: Pieter van der Aa (1.). 1721.

== Bibliography ==
- Ayers, Andrew (2004). The Architecture of Paris. Stuttgart; London: Edition Axel Menges. ISBN 9783930698967.
- Berger, Robert W. (1993). The Palace of the Sun: The Louvre of Louis XIV. University Park: The Pennsylvania State University Press. ISBN 9780271008479.
- Blondel, Jacques-François (1756). Architecture françoise, vol. 4. Paris: Charles-Antoine Jombert.
- Daufresne, Jean-Claude (1987). Louvre et Tuileries: Architectures de papier. Brussels: Pierre Mardaga. ISBN 9782870092828.
- Gietmann, Gerhard (1913). "Perrault, Claude", vol. 11, pp. 701–702, in The Catholic Encyclopedia, edited by Charles G. Herbermann et al., 15 volumes. New York: The Encyclopedia Press.
- Hazard, Jean (2007). "Claude Perrault, architecte célèbre, médecin inconnu, chercheur indefatigable" (in French) ["Claude Perrault, famous architect, unknown physician, untiring researcher"]. Histoire des Sciences médicales, vol 41, no. 4, pp. 399–406. PMID 18450300.
- Hermann, Wolfgang (1982). "Perrault, Claude", vol. 3, pp. 391–392, in Macmillan Encyclopedia of Architects, edited by Adolf K. Placzek. London: The Free Press. ISBN 9780029250006.
- Michel, Christian (1996). "Perrault family: (3) Charles Perrault", vol. 24, p. 470, in The Dictionary of Art, edited by Jane Turner. London: Macmillan.
- Neuman, Robert (2013). Baroque and Rococo Art and Architecture. Boston: Pearson. ISBN 9780205832262.
- Perrault, Claude; Lesure, François. "Du bruit"; et "De la musique des anciens", extracts from Oeuvres diverses de physique et de mécanique (tome 2); and Préface manuscrite du Traité de la musique de Claude Perrault (Bibl. Nat. manuscr. fr. 25,350). Bibliothèque nationale de France.
- Picon, Antoine (1988). Claude Perrault, 1613–1688, ou, La curiosité d'un classique. Paris: Picard. ISBN 9782708403772.
- Tadgell, Christopher (1996). "Perrault family. (2) Claude Perrault", vol. 24, pp. 470, in The Dictionary of Art, edited by Jane Turner. London: Macmillan.
