= Lucky (magazine) =

American women's magazine

- Vanessa Hudgens covering the November 2008 issue
- Editor: Eva Chen
- Categories: Fashion
- Frequency: Quarterly
- Publisher: Condé Nast
- Total circulation: 1,109,835 (December 2012)
- Founded: 2000
- Final issue: June 2015
- Company: Advance Publications
- Country: United States
- Language: English
- Website: www.luckymag.com
- ISSN: 1531-4294

Lucky was a women's and fashion magazine founded by Kim France and first published in 2000 under the Condé Nast subsidiary. The magazine folded in June 2015.

== Operations and history ==
Since its launch in December 2000, Lucky was one of Condé Nast's biggest publications, with circulation rising from 500,000 to over 1.1 million.

Kim France founded Lucky and was its first editor-in-chief, a position she held for almost ten years. Brandon Holley replaced France as editor-in-chief in 2010. In June 2013, Eva Chen replaced Holley as EIC of Lucky after a source revealed that "while Holley was digitally savvy, she lacked vision and fashion experience [and thus] the publication lost its style credentials". Chen's approach of featuring unknown fashion bloggers while recruiting expensive, upscale stylists like Carlyne Cerf de Dudzeele and legendary photographers like Patrick Demarchelier caused Lucky’s newsstand sales to fall even further by 15.8% in the first half of 2014 to 84,255 due to its high price point. Chen later resigned from the post in April 2015.

In 2012, Lucky announced that it would hold its first FABB: The Fashion and Beauty Blog conference. It was the first event of its kind, bringing together group of digital fashion, beauty, technology and celebrity leaders, and influential advertisers to the blogger community. Some of the participants included: Cat Deeley, Alli Webb, Jessica Alba and Paige Adams-Geller.

In April 2014, BeachMint, a Los Angeles–based e-commerce company began a joint venture with Condé Nast. The Condé Nast press release revealed that the venture would be called the Lucky Group. Eva Chen served as the chief creative officer for the Lucky Group, and BeachMint's Josh Bearman as its CEO. This effectively meant that Lucky Magazine was sold to Beachmint.

In May 2015 the frequency of Lucky was switched to quarterly. One month later, in June 2015, the magazine folded. Katia Kuethe was the magazine's final Creative Director.

== Reception ==
From the magazine industry

When Lucky was first released, it received criticism for its content that bordered between editorial and advertising. The American Society of Magazine Editors was skeptical of Lucky's business practices in featuring products. Lucky's reputation grew to a more positive one as time progressed. Simon Dumenco, a columnist at New York Magazine initially gave a negative assessment, but later praised the magazine for focusing on the merits of a product rather than advertising it through celebrity endorsements like other women's magazines. David Carr and Jeremy W. Peters said in an article published in The New York Times: "It was, in retrospect, ahead of its time, a print rendering of a shopping portal on the Web. It was well received by both the news media and advertisers, in part because it was a well executed magazine that did not take itself too seriously."

From the advertising industry

Lucky was Advertising Age's Magazine of the Year in 2003, highlighting its success with marketers and consumers.
