= Perraud =

Perraud is a surname. Notable people with the surname include:

- Adolphe Perraud (1828–1906), French Cardinal and academician
- Florent Perraud (born 1982), French footballer
- Jean-Joseph Perraud (1819-1876), French sculptor
- Jean-Marc Perraud, French businessman
- Romain Perraud (born 1997), French footballer
