= Perrot =

Perrot may refer to:

People

- Charles Perrot (disambiguation), several people
- Claude Perrot (born 1951), French alpine skier
- Claude-Hélène Perrot (1928–2019), French historian and Africanist
- Éric Perrot (born 2001), French biathlete
- François-Marie Perrot (1644–1691), governor of Montreal
- Georges Perrot (1832–1914), French archaeologist
- Henri Perrot (1883–1961), French engineer
- James Perrot (1571–1636), Welsh writer and Member of Parliament
- Jean Perrot (1920–2012), French archaeologist
- Jean-Marie Perrot (1877–1943), Breton independentist
- John Perrot (1528–1592), Lord Deputy of Ireland
- Jules Perrot (1810–1892), French dancer and choreographer
- Kim Perrot (1967–1999), American basketball player
- Marcel Perrot, French fencer
- Nicolas Perrot (1644–1717), French explorer and diplomat
- Nicole Perrot (born 1983), Chilean golfer
- Xavier Perrot (1932–2008), Swiss racing driver

Places

- Île Perrot, an island in southwestern Quebec, Canada
- L'Île-Perrot, Quebec, Canada

Other

- Bezen Perrot, Breton collaborationist unit that fought for Germany in WWII

== See also ==
- Perot (disambiguation)
