= Katia Obraczka =

American electrical engineer

Katia Obraczka is a Professor of Computer Engineering and Graduate Director at Department of Computer Engineering, University of California, Santa Cruz.

Obraczka obtained her M.S. and Ph.D. in computer science from University of Southern California in 1984 and 1990 respectively. She then got another M.S. in computer engineering in 1987 from the Federal University of Rio de Janeiro in Rio de Janeiro, Brazil. After graduation, she remained at USC, working as a research scientist at its Information Sciences Institute and then joined the USC's Department of Computer Science.

She was named Fellow of the Institute of Electrical and Electronics Engineers (IEEE) in 2014 "for contributions to energy-efficient protocols and routing in wireless networks".
