= Perreault =

Perreault is a surname of French origin, and may refer to:

== In sport ==
=== Hockey ===
- Bob Perreault (1931–1980), Canadian ice hockey player
- Gabe Perreault (born 2005), Canadian ice hockey player
- Gilbert Perreault (born 1950), Canadian ice hockey player
- Jacob Perreault (born 2002), Canadian ice hockey player
- Mathieu Perreault (born 1988), Canadian ice hockey player
- Yanic Perreault (born 1971), Canadian ice hockey player

=== Other sports ===
- Annie Perreault (born 1971), Canadian short track speed skater
- Dominique Perreault (born 1984), Canadian water polo player
- Pete Perreault (1939–2001), American football guard

== Other ==
- Guillaume Perreault (born 1985), Canadian writer, illustrator
- Melanie Perreault, American historian and academic administrator
- Mona Perreault, American politician
- Robert Perreault (born 1947), Canadian politician
