= Victor Nicolas =

French sculptor

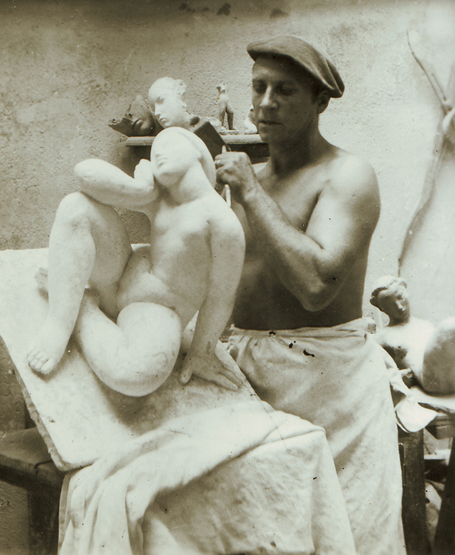
- Nicolas in his studio of Montmeyan in 1950
- Born: Victor Edmond Nicolas; 2 February 1906; Brignoles, France
- Died: 16 July 1979 (aged 73); Montmeyan, France
- Education: École nationale supérieure des arts décoratifs; École nationale supérieure des beaux-arts
- Known for: Sculpture

Victor Edmond Nicolas (2 February 1906 – 16 July 1979) was a French sculptor.

== Biography ==
Victor Nicolas was born in Brignoles, France, the son of Nicolas Bertin (1879–1918), a professor of mathematics Mort pour la France, and Victorine Tardieu (1878–1965), teacher. He was the grandson of Fortuné Nicolas (1850–1920), judge of the canton court of Tavernes and mayor of Montmeyan from 1886 to 1892.

He was married to Josette Behar (1911–2011), sculptor, graduated from the École nationale supérieure des beaux-arts in Paris, with whom he had a son, Nicolas Vincent (1934–2009).

Educated at the college of Lorgues and then in high school of Toulon, where he received a scholarship from the artists society in Toulon.

Graduated from the École nationale supérieure des arts décoratifs in Paris. Student of Hector Lemaire, Camille Lefevre and Pierre Séguin. Eight medals won between 1924 and 1926.

Graduated from the École nationale supérieure des beaux-arts in Paris, sculpture section. Student of Jules Coutan, Paul Landowski and Auguste Carli between 1926 and 1930. Prize Roux of the Institut de France and prize Chenavard of the École nationale supérieure des beaux-arts. Elected chairman of the Fine Arts Section from the General Association of Students of Paris in 1928.

Three-time winner at the Salon des artistes français: honorable mention in 1929, bronze medal in 1933 and silver medal in 1934. Twice scholarship at the prestigious Prix de Rome of sculpture in 1930 and in 1933. Has worked in the studios of the sculptors Henri-Edouard Lombard and Naoum Aronson.

Set up his studio in Montmeyan, in the former chapel of the Holy Spirit, in 1930. Created many monuments in the departments of Var and Alpes-Maritimes. Also created various busts and work exhibited several times at the Henri Gaffié gallery of Nice.

Elected city councilor of Montmeyan and delegate for Senate election in 1935. Member of the National Front (French Resistance), designated mayor of Montmeyan in 1944, president of the Comité local de libération. Elected deputy mayor of Montmeyan in 1945 and designated deputy judge of the canton court of Tavernes in 1946.

Came to painting in 1953; his paintings and drawings are exhibited on several occasions in Artignosc-sur-Verdon and Draguignan between 1955 and 1957.

Appointed professor of drawing at the École des beaux-arts of Toulon in 1956 and taught there until the age of retirement in 1976. He died in a road accident in Montmeyan.

A posthumous exhibition of his paintings, drawings and sculptures is organised in Montmeyan in August and September 1981. The XXIVth Salon des imagiers of Toulon is dedicated to him from December 1981 to January 1982.

== Work ==
- Monument dedicated to Jean Aicard, jardin Alexandre 1er, Toulon, 1931 (the bronze bust was destroyed by the Germans during the occupation)
- Tribute to the Unknown Soldier, plaster bas-relief, Prize Roux of the Institut de France, Paris, 1933
- Fisherman pulling in his net, plaster statue, prize Chenavard of the École nationale supérieure des beaux-arts, Paris, 1933
- Jacques Bonhomme, plaster statue, silver medal of the Salon des artistes français, Paris, 1934
- Monument dedicated to Raynouard, white marble bust, place Saint-Pierre, Brignoles, 1937
- Selected for the creation of a monument dedicated to Général François Mireur, Escragnolles, under the chairmanship of Paul Landowski, 1939
- First prize in the national competition for the erection of an equestrian statue of Joan of Arc in Nice, 1943
- The Tragedy and The Dance, two monumental statues in the open air theater, jardin Albert 1er, Nice, 1947
- Monument dedicated to Emilie Morel, La Martre, 1947
- Bas-relief dedicated to the poet Charles Calais, Nice, 1948
- Monument dedicated to the heroes and martyrs of the Bessillon, Pontevès, 1949
- Fresco of the Saint-Maur school, Toulon, 1963
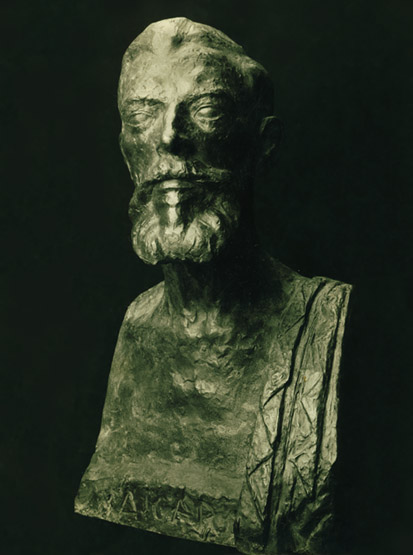
Monument dedicated to Jean Aicard, Toulon (detail of the bronze bust, 1931).

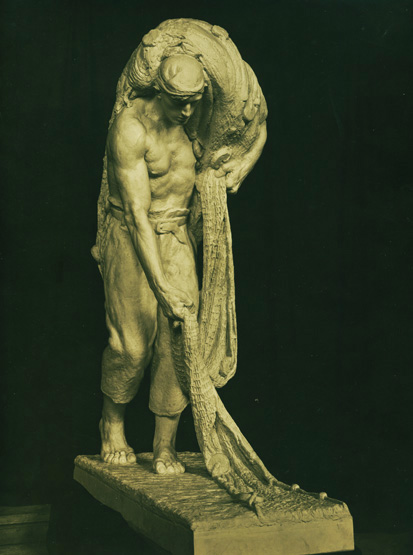
Fisherman pulling in his net, prize Chenavard of the École nationale supérieure des beaux-arts, Paris (plaster statue, 1933).

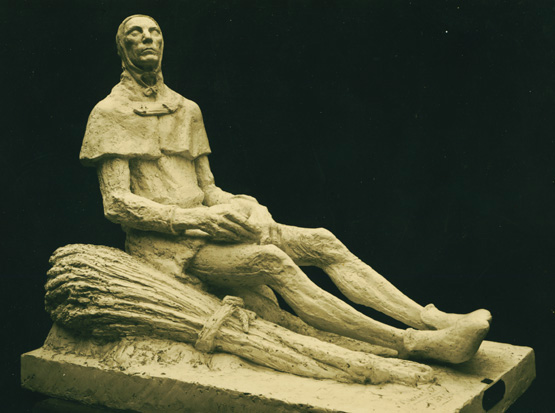
Jacques Bonhomme, silver medal of the Salon des artistes français, Paris (plaster statue, 1934).

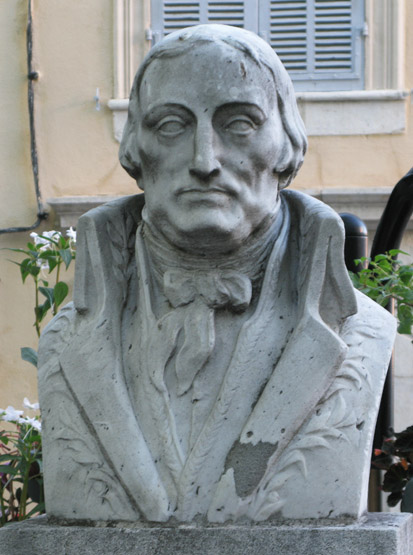
Monument dedicated to Raynouard, Brignoles (detail of the white marble bust, 1937).

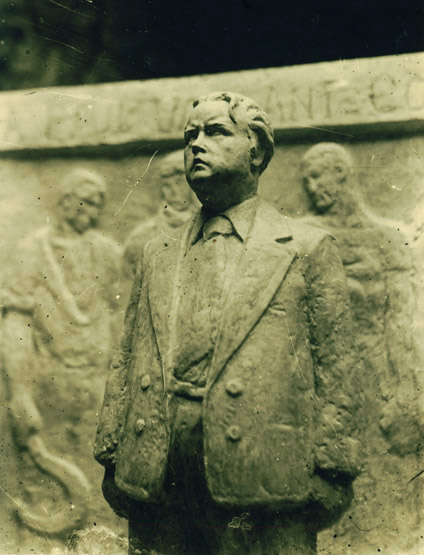
Project of monument to Paul Vaillant-Couturier (plaster model, 1938).

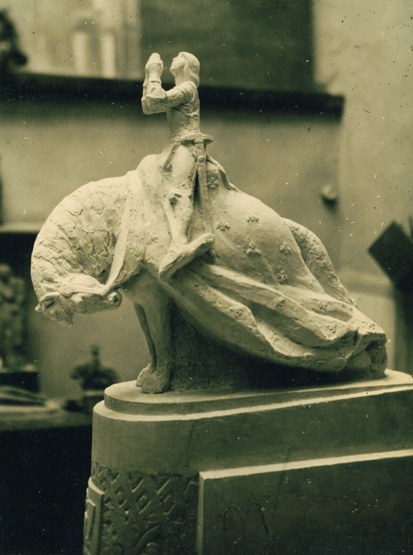
Equestrian statue of Joan of Arc (model for national competition, 1943).

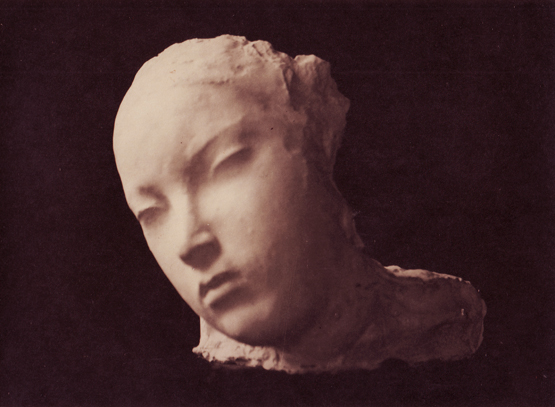
Girl mask (plaster model, 1946).

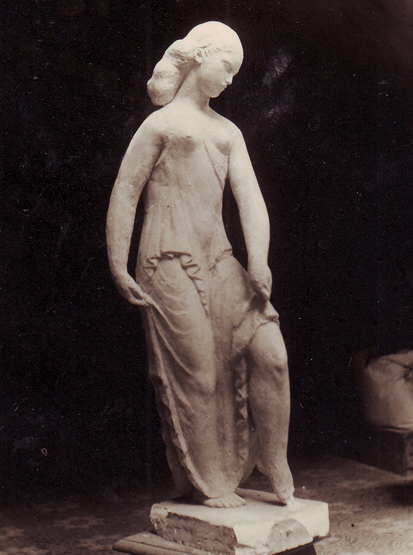
Statue The danse , open air theater, jardin Albert 1er, Nice (plaster model, 1947).

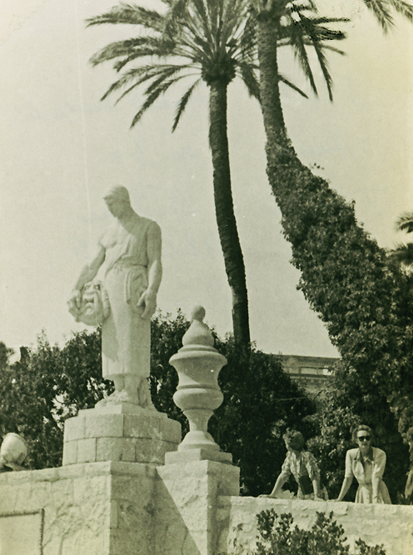
Statue The tragedy, open air theater, jardin Albert 1er, Nice (monumental statue, 1947).

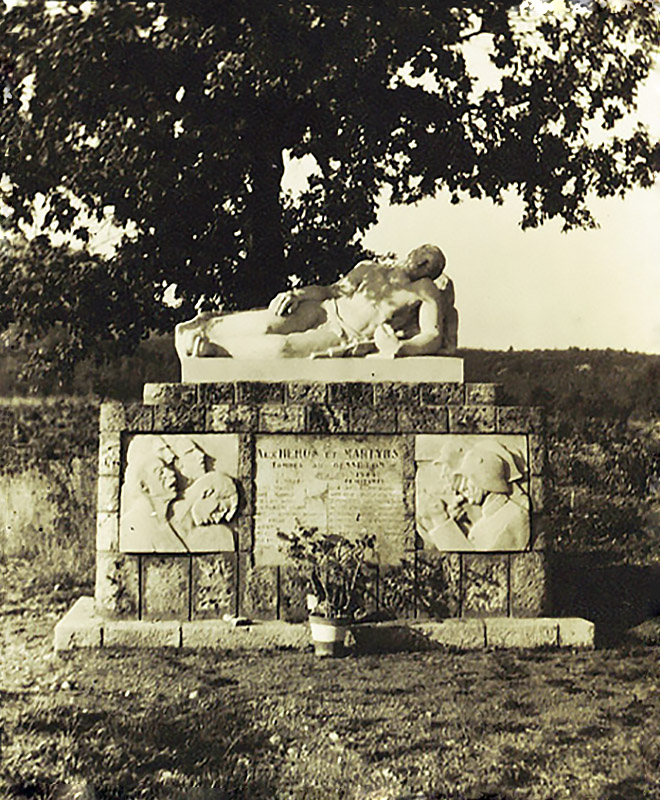
Monument dedicated to the heroes and martyrs of the Bessillon in Pontevès (overview,1949).

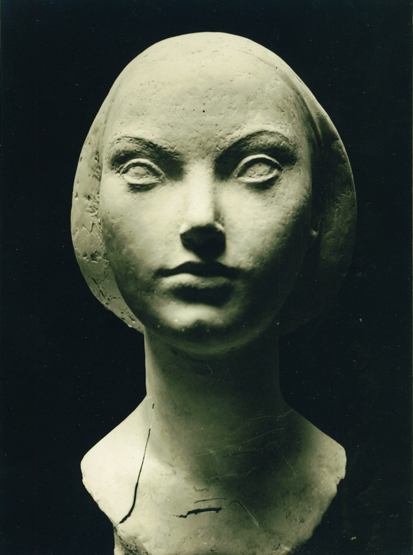
Head of a young woman (plaster model, 1950).

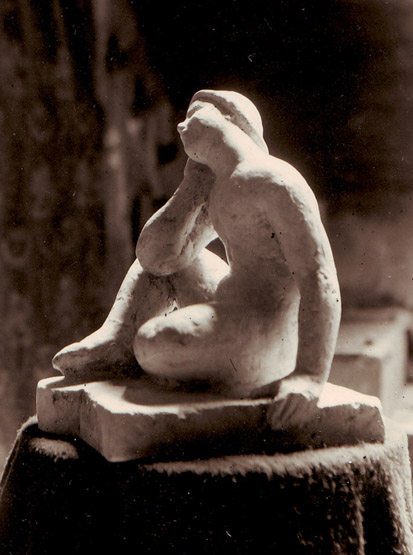
Woman sitting (plaster model, 1953).

== Bibliography ==
- Poèmes, choix de seize poèmes de Léon Vérane, calligraphiés et accompagnés de seize lithographies d'Eugène Baboulène, Henri Bertrand-Arnoux, Gabriel Cotel, Paul-M. David, Pierre-Henri Dumas, Louis Férec, Albert Janin, Laurent Mattio, Jean-Gérard Mattio, Victor Nicolas, Georges Obled, Olive-Tamari, Georges Palmieri, Henri Pertus, Léon Sabatier, Salvado. Préface de Joseph Paoli. Presse lithographique de l’Ecole des Beaux-Arts de Toulon, 1957.
- Jacques Girault, Dictionnaire biographique du mouvement ouvrier français, Centre national de la recherche scientifique, tome 37, Éditions Ouvrières, 1990.
- Mireille Pinsseau, Les Peintres en Provence et sur la Côte d'Azur pendant la Seconde Guerre mondiale. Éditions La Thune, Marseille, 2004.
