= Montmeyan =

- Commune
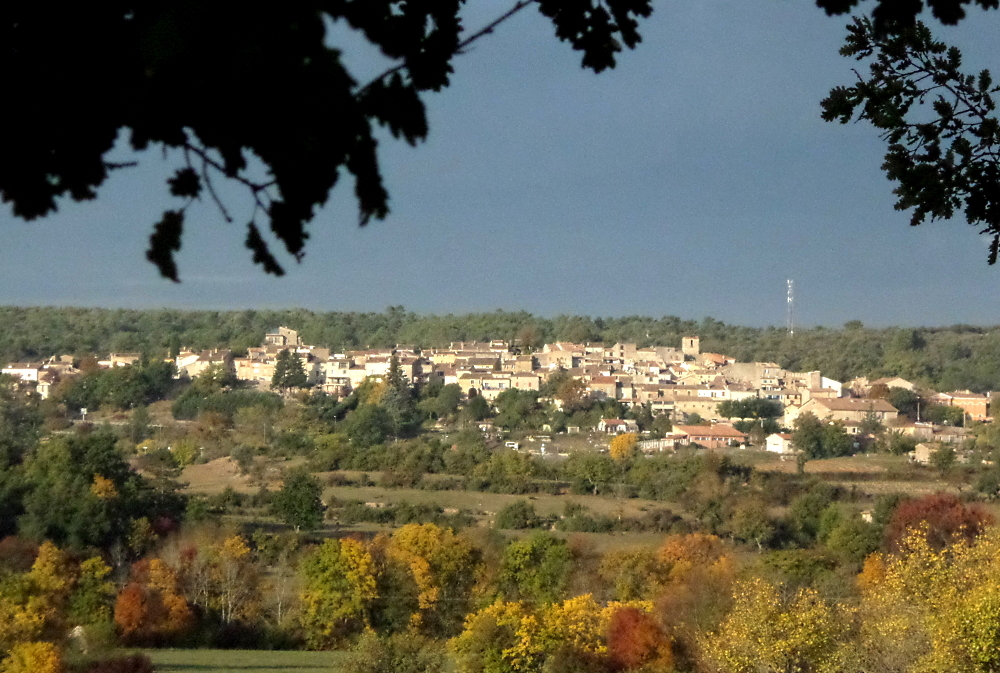
- A general view of the village

- Coat of arms
- Location of Montmeyan
- Location within France Location within Provence-Alpes-Côte d'Azur
- Coordinates: 43°38′51″N 6°03′50″E
- Country: France
- Region: Provence-Alpes-Côte d'Azur
- Department: Var
- Arrondissement: Brignoles
- Canton: Flayosc
- Intercommunality: Provence Verdon

Government
  - Mayor (2020–2026): Louis Reynier
- Area^{1}: 39.43 km^{2} (15.22 sq mi)
- Highest elevation: 691 m (2,267 ft)
- Lowest elevation: 358 m (1,175 ft)
- Population (2023): 596
  - Density: 15.1/km^{2} (39.1/sq mi)
- Time zone: UTC+01:00 (CET)
  - Summer (DST): UTC+02:00 (CEST)
- INSEE/Postal code: 83084 /83670
- ^{1} French Land Register data, which excludes lakes, ponds, glaciers > 1 km^{2} (0.386 sq mi or 247 acres) and river estuaries.

Montmeyan (French pronunciation: [mɔ̃mɛjɑ̃]; Mount-Meyan in Provençal language of Mistralian norm and Montmejan in classical norm) is a commune (municipality), located in the department of Var, in the region of Provence-Alpes-Côte d'Azur, southeastern France.

== Geography ==
Montmeyan is a fortified medieval village, built at 504 m altitude on a rocky promontory in the middle of the plain, near the gorges du Verdon and lac de Sainte-Croix.

The towers of the fortifications still overlook a village with narrow streets, vaulted passages, stairs and retaining arches.

With an area of 3943 hectares, the commune of Montmeyan now totals 532 permanent inhabitants.

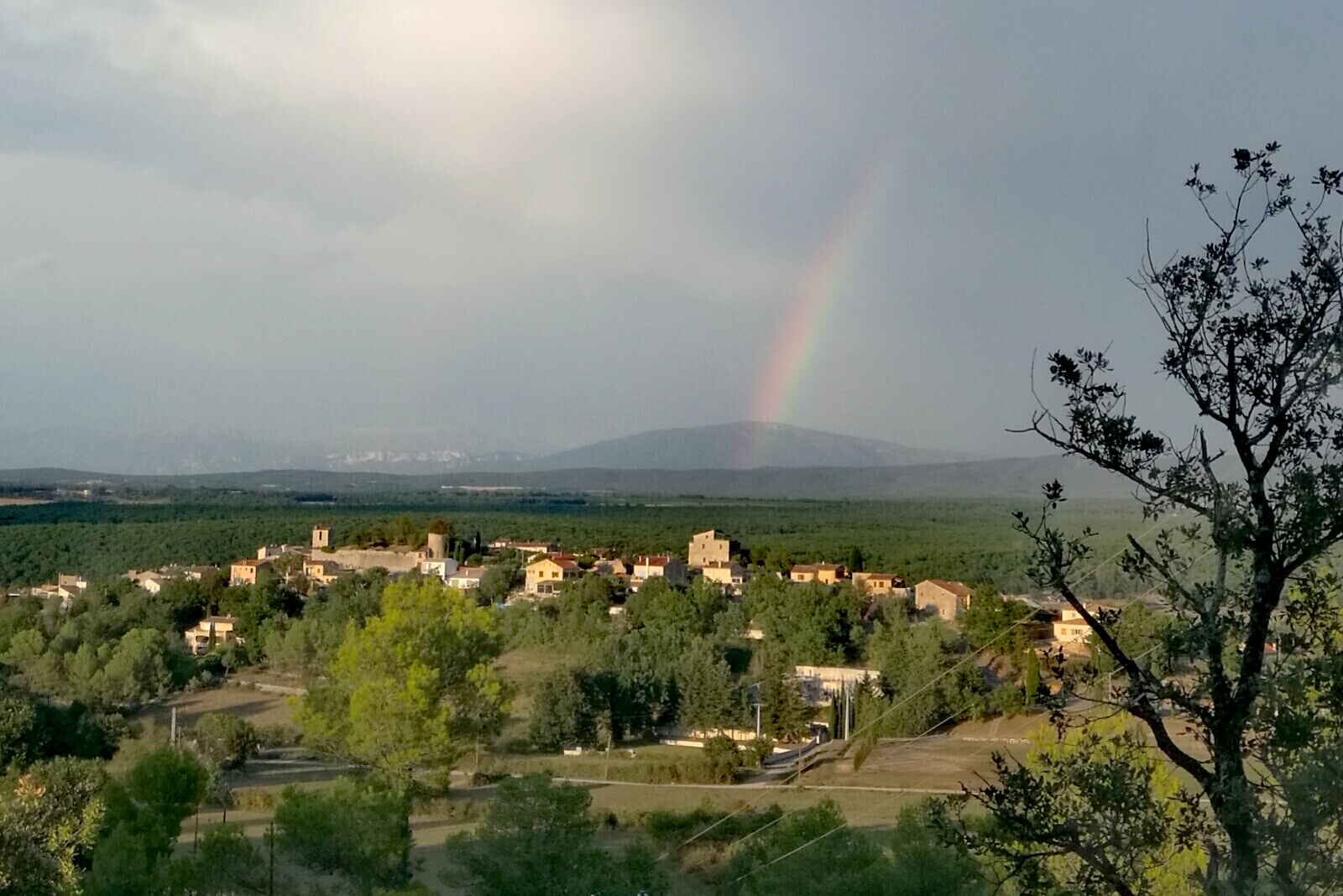
Overview west side, August 2022

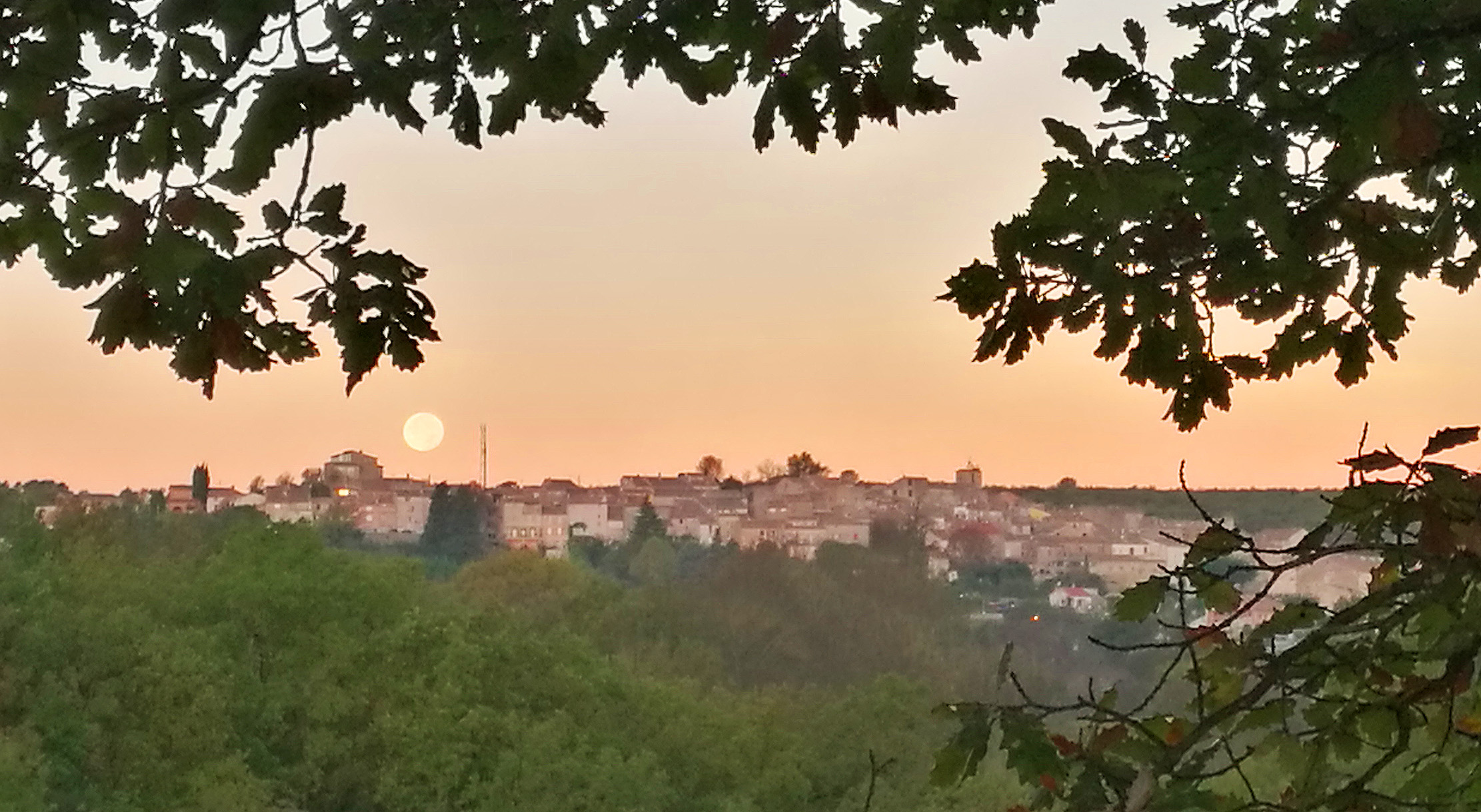
Overview east side, October 2018

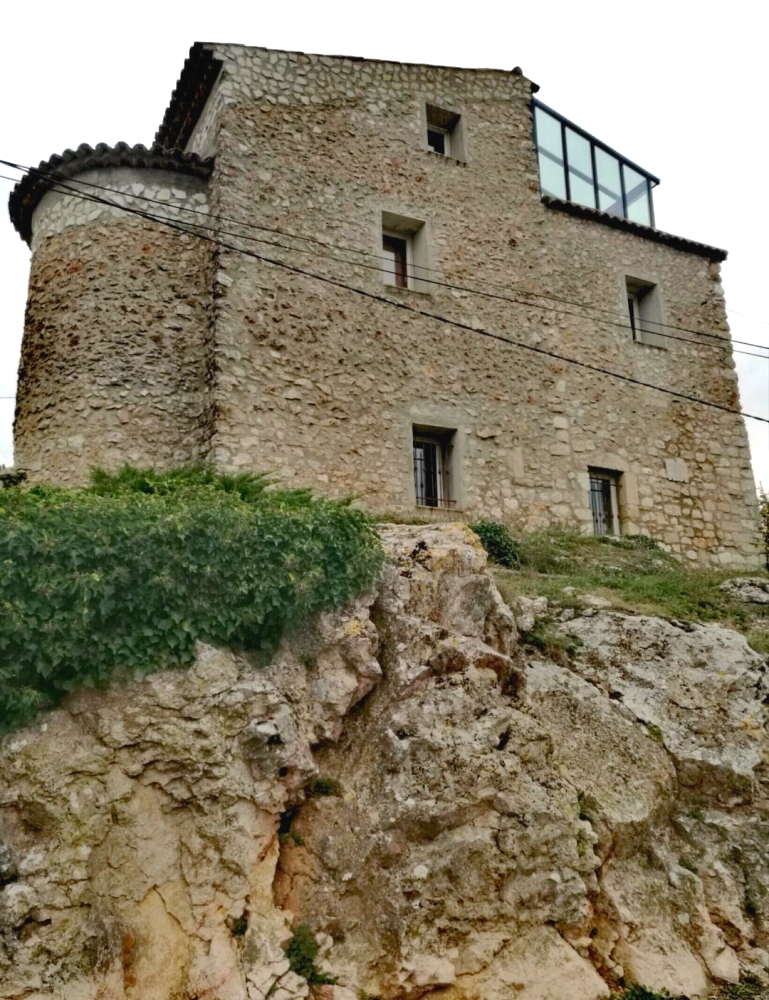
Chapel of the Holy Spirit, November 2022

== Geology ==
The syncline of Montmeyan is a rift oriented north-south, created by the first Alpine movement dating from the Oligocene epoch, which extends over 12 km between Quinson and Fox-Amphoux. It is filled with red clays dating from the Lower Eocene, divided into two masses by a limestone bank.

In this narrow plain, bordered by limestone faults, there are outcrops of sedimentary rocks dating from the Jurassic and Cretaceous. These rocks contain rare fossils, dinosaurs' eggs and bones, ammonites, fish and shellfish (Potamida).

== Economy ==
Montmeyan draws its resources from agriculture, livestock and tourism, is part of Communauté de Communes Provence Verdon and Pays de la Provence Verte.

Several accommodation facilities are available in the area: two campsites just outside the village, holiday cottages and bed and breakfasts.

Two equestrian centers are installed in Montmeyan. The nautical base of Montmeyan Lake serves as a boarding point to explore the low gorges du Verdon in the direction of Esparron-de-Verdon: the rental of kayaks, canoes or boats with electric motors is become an important activity.

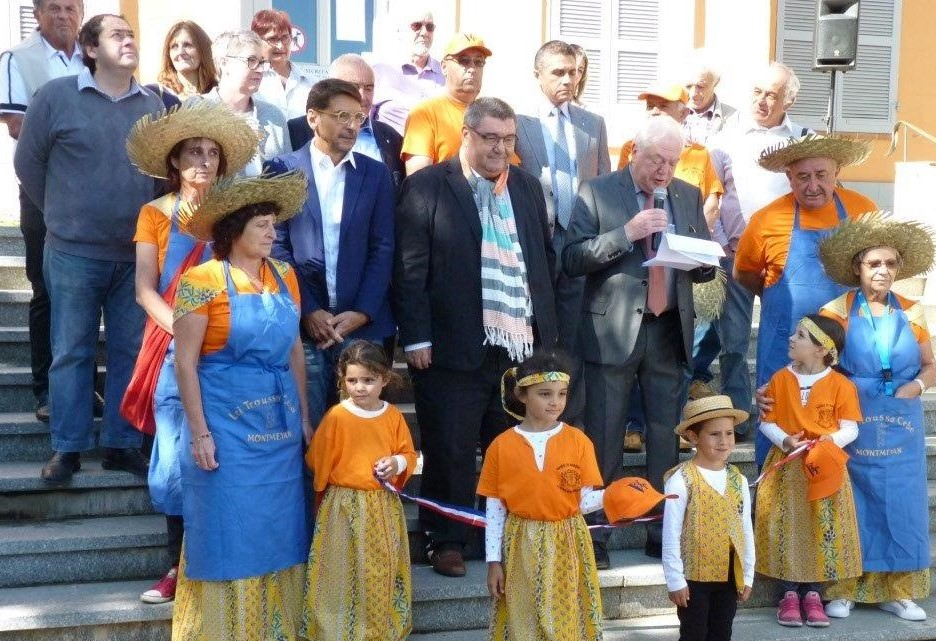
Onion fair, September 2017

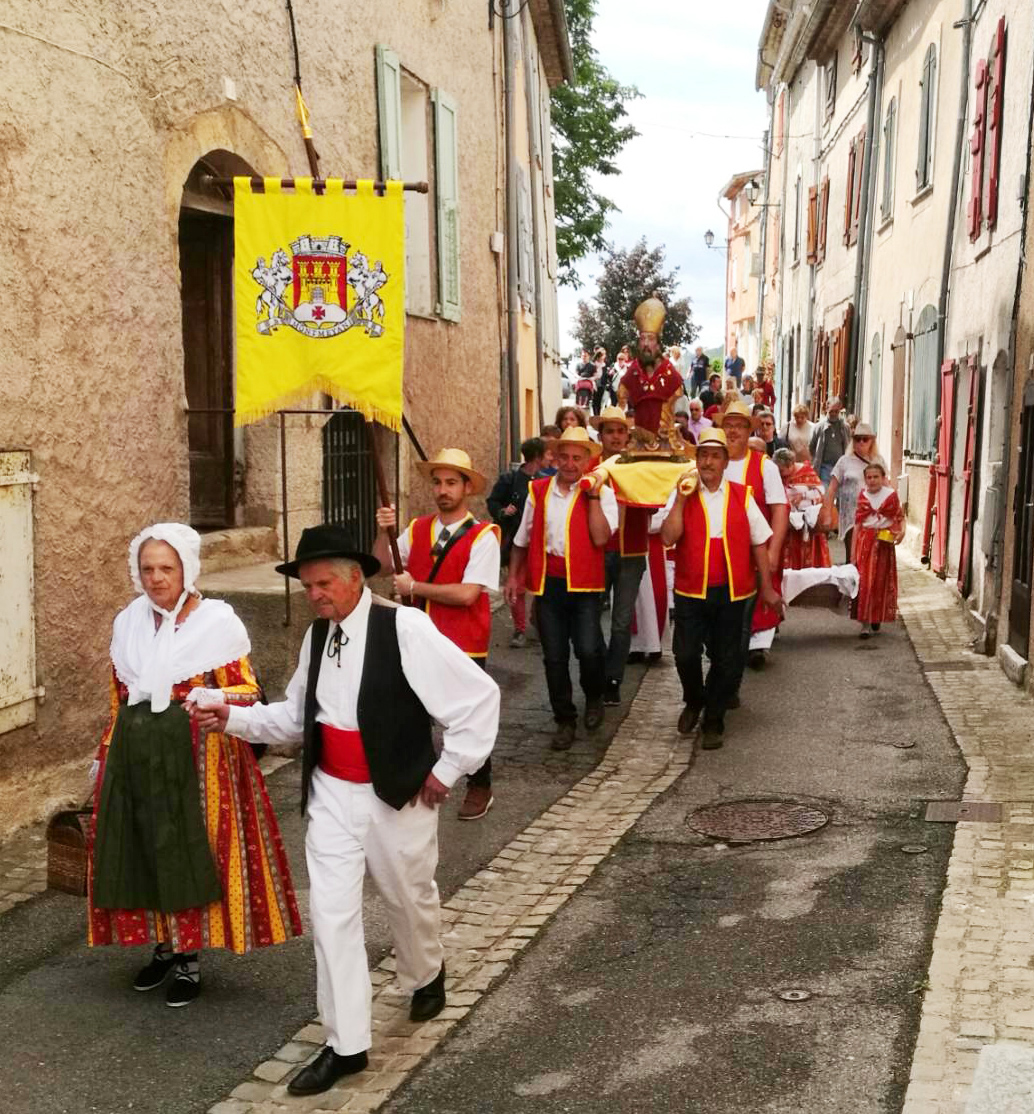
Saint Leger procession, May 2018

== Toponymy ==
Montmeyan appears in the records from the 12th century as Locus of Monte Mejano then Montis Mediani (the 'mountain that is in the middle').

The Gallic word Meillan, Latinized as Mediolanum, means 'plain located in the middle', a real sacred place to the Gaul people. Montmeyan was probably a Gaul Mediolanum, religious and political center which would gather the tribes (or neighboring cities combined) to address their common interests, in a fortification overlooking a rural 'flat countryside'.

The demonym of the inhabitants is Montmeyannais.

== Heraldry ==

The coat of arms of Montmeyan is: Gules, a triple towered castle or, on a mount in base argent charged with a cross pattée gules.

This blazon is inspired from the one recorded by Hozier for the commune, without cross pattée, and only with the castle keep of three turrets (Armorial d'Hozier, section Provence, tome II, page 1588). Montmeyan’s coat of arms are similar to those of House of Castellane. This family has owned this land for a very long time (Armorial des communes de Provence, Louis de Bresc, page 198).

== History ==
=== Prehistory and Antiquity ===
The presence of man in the Middle Paleolithic is attested in the territory of Montmeyan with the site of Breuil shelter in the valley of Verdon. Several traces of Neolithic and Bronze Age habitat, with prehistoric ramparts, were discovered on the territory.

A dolmen from the Chalcolithic period on the plateau of La Colle and two tumuli (bronze Age/iron Age) in La Petite Roquette are listed in the inventory of megaliths of Montmeyan. During the Iron Age, the Celtic-Ligurian tribes install two camps surrounded by thick stone walls at Castelar. The Roman occupation has left abundant traces in Enguerne and La Grande Roquette.

=== Middle Ages ===
In the 12th and 13th centuries, the abbey Saint-André de Villeneuve-lès-Avignon is owning the parish church, and collects its income.

==== Knights Templar ====
In October 1164, Lord Hugh of Montmeyan enters the Order of the Temple and gives the land of Camp Long and grazing rights on the whole territory of Montmeyan. He waives all rights and inheritance in favor of the Commandry of Saint-Maurin located in Régusse. In November 1170, the Lord of Blachère gives and grants the Templar church of Saint-Maurin all the cultivated and uncultivated land, the right to pasture and the water from banks of the Verdon. He also gives the freedom to build a flour mill in the valley of Beau Rive and a place to prepare their bread.

In 1223, the Commandry of Saint-Maurin purchases the castle of Montmeyan, with the support - probably financial - of the Commandry of Ruou. The deed of sale is of great interest with regard to the terms of such acquisition. During the Crusades, Montmeyan plays an important role in the presence of the soldier-monks between Argens and Verdon rivers.

==== Disappearance of the Order of the Temple ====
After the disappearance of the Order in 1308, the land of Montmeyan is attached to the area of the royal court of Provence in 1309, then passed to the Hospitallers of Saint John of Jerusalem in 1319. Arnaud de Trian, Earl of Aliff in the Naples kingdom and nephew of Pope John XXII, makes the land acquisition in 1322.

In 1409, Marguerite de Trian, the granddaughter of Arnaud, becomes the wife of George de Castellane and thus brings the territory of the Montmeyan to the House of Castellane which keeps this lordship for more than three centuries. Between 1579 and 1660, the Castellane-Montmeyan family provides six Knights to the Order of St. John of Jerusalem.

In the 16th century, seven co-seigneurs share the stronghold, built in marquisate in 1651 for Jean-Augustin de Foresta. The Grimaldi-Régusse are the last Lords of the place before the French Revolution.

=== French Revolution ===
In the summer of 1789, the Lord of Montmeyan emigrates to Germany. In 1790, its property is registered, forests are declared state property and agricultural land is either sold or leased.

From this period, Montmeyan depends on the district of Barjols and is part of the canton of Tavernes. In 1793, the population is of 661 inhabitants.

=== After the French Revolution ===
In 1840, the small village of La Roquette is attached to Montmeyan who thus obtains a territorial and demographic increase. The population reached then its historic peak with 768 inhabitants.

Following the coup d'état of 2 December 1851, Montmeyan is part of the insurgent communes and a hundred men arrives in Aups on 9 December 1851. 51 Republicans from Montmeyan are caught and convicted. They are compensated by the Republic in 1882. Since then, the population decreases to reach its lowest level in 1946 with 249 inhabitants.

Twenty-eight Montmeyannais were mobilized during the Franco-Prussian War of 1870. During the First World War, fourteen inhabitants are Morts pour la France. During the Second World War, ten inhabitants made up the Comité local de libération which took care of the tasks of the Resistance and prepared the Liberation. The Francs-Tireurs et Partisans destroy the Verdon bridge by sabotage in 1944.

In the context of the end of the Algerian war, a hamlet 'de forestage' is created in late 1962 to house 30 former Harkis and their families; the arrival of these 141 people marks the beginning of a new population growth. In 2017, Montmeyan population is of 551 inhabitants.

== Demography ==
Historical population

Year	Pop.	±% p.a.
1793	661	—
1821	733	+0.37%
1846	746	+0.07%
1872	685	−0.33%
1901	446	−1.47%
1926	356	−0.90%
1946	249	−1.77%
1962	259	+0.25%
1968	408	+7.87%

Year	Pop.	±% p.a.
1975	387	−0.75%
1982	299	−3.62%
1990	380	+3.04%
1999	399	+0.54%
2007	532	+3.66%
2012	592	+2.16%
2017	551	−1.43%
2023	596	+1.32%

Source: EHESS and INSEE

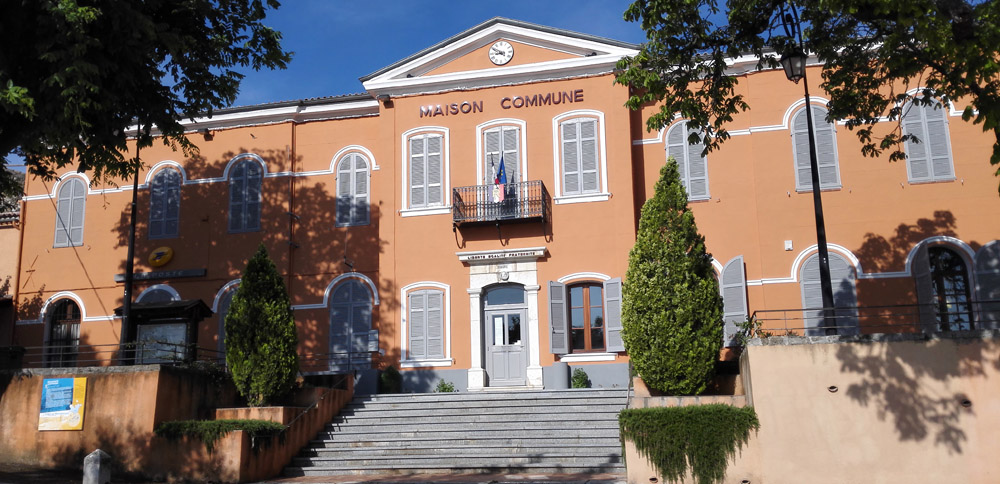
The town hall, June 2015

== Sites and Monuments ==
- The fortified medieval village contains the remains of defensive equipment, including Charlemagne Tower (square belfry with arrowslits) and many architectural elements dating from the 12th century.
- The parish church of Notre Dame, of Romanesque architecture, dates from the 12th century and was modified in the 18th century; it has a square bell-tower with campanile.
- Some medieval houses, including one located in Couvent Street, date from the 12th century.
- The square tower of Castelar, on top of a rocky needle in La Grande Roquette, dates from the 12th century; it overlooks the remains of the church and the village of La Roquette (village abandoned in the 15th century) .
- The chapel of the Holy Spirit, on a rocky promontory at the top of the village, dates from the 13th century, was the sculptor's studio of Victor Nicolas during the 20th century and has become private property.
- The castle of l’Éouvière, building from the 18th century located south of the village, has become a camping caravaning.
- The Three Crosses, erected on a high point at the intersection of the limits of Fox-Amphoux Montmeyan and Tavernes, have been a place of procession; there is an orientation table.
- The aqueduct of Beau Rivé, built in 1865 for irrigation.
- Both tumuli of La Petite Roquette are from the bronze Age and the iron Age.
- The dolmen of La Colle, northwest of the commune, dates from Chalcolithic.
- The rock shelter of Breuil, discovered in northern boundary of the commune in l’Escourche near the Verdon, dates from the Middle Paleolithic.
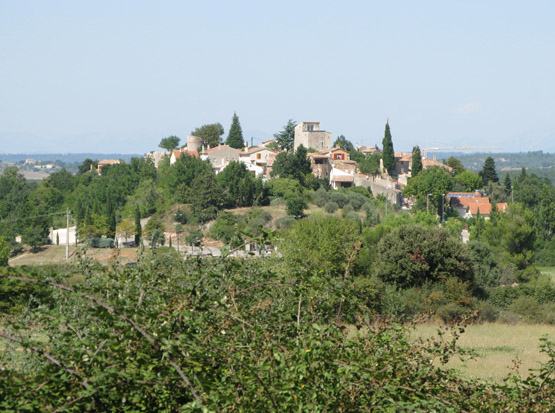
West side, August 2011

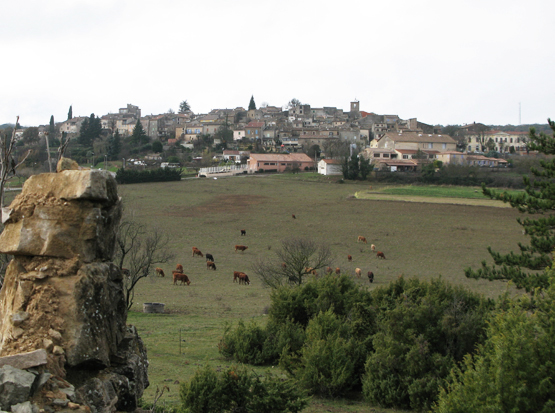
East side, February 2010

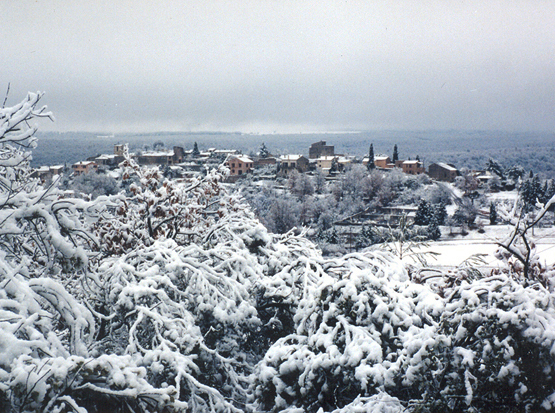
Under the snow, December 2001

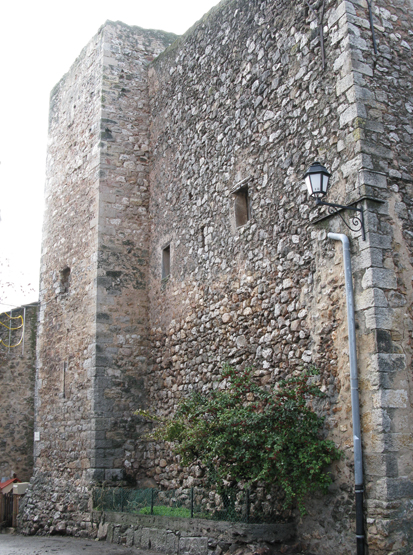
Charlemagne tower dating from the 12th century, December 2010

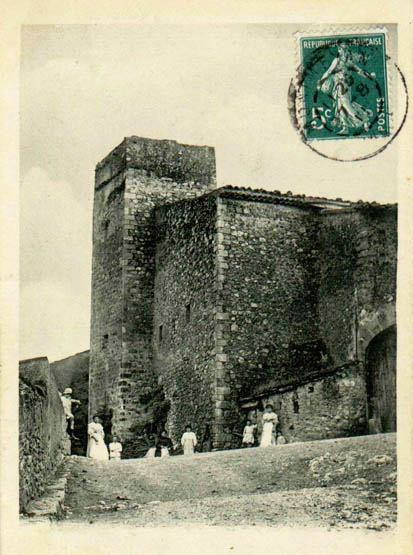
Charlemagne Tower dating from the 12th century, 1910

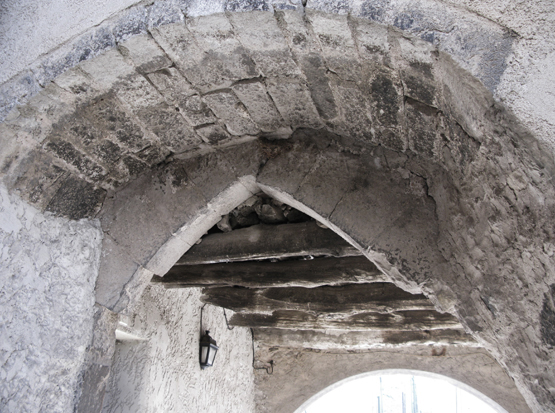
Rampart’s gate dating from the 12th century, December 2010

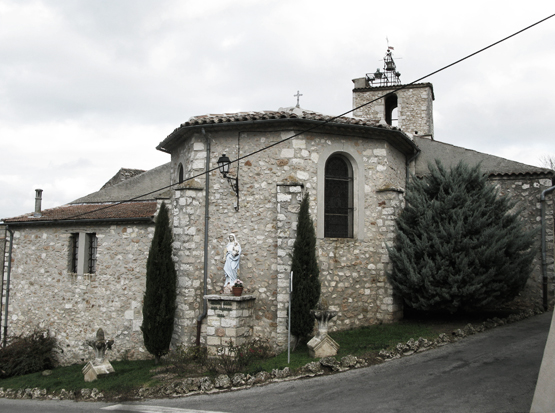
Church of Notre Dame dating from the 12th century (apse), December 2010

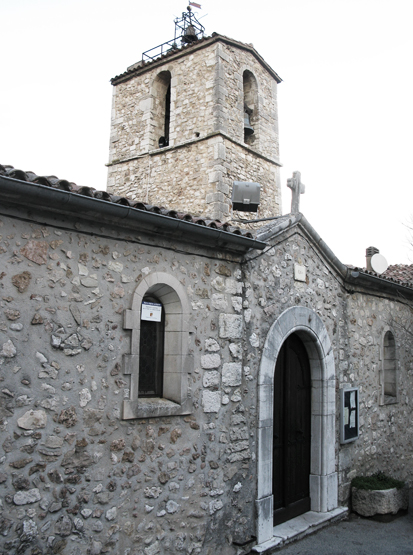
Church of Notre Dame dating from the 12th century (Entrance), December 2010

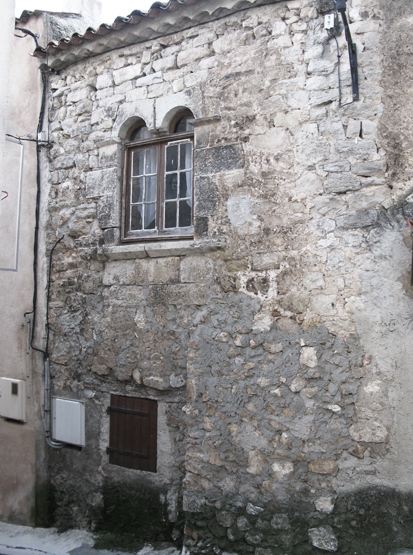
Medieval house dating from the 12th century, December 2010

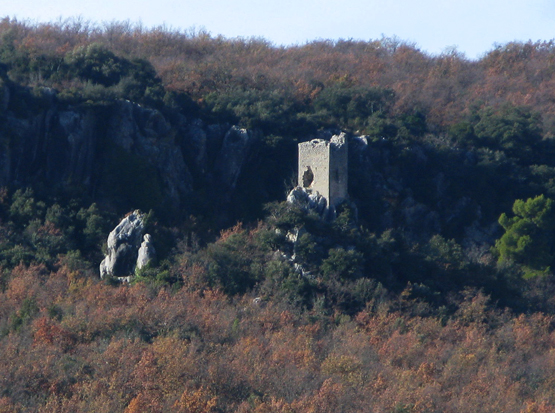
Castelar tower dating from the 13th century, December 2010

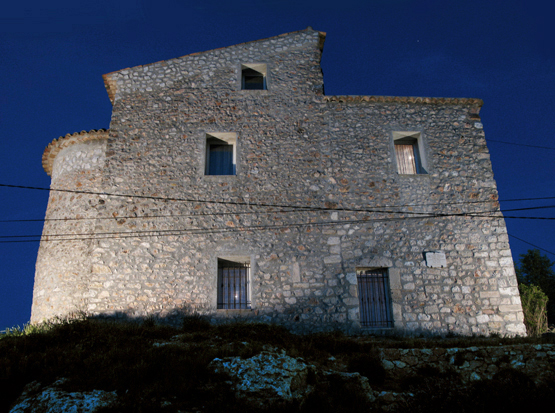
Chapel of the Holy Spirit dating from the 13th century, May 2008

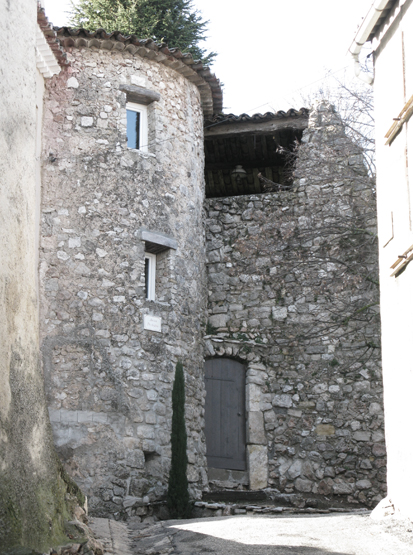
Castle tower, December 2010

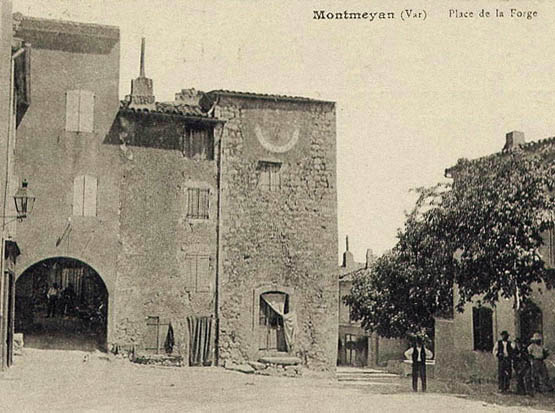
Place de la Forge, 1910

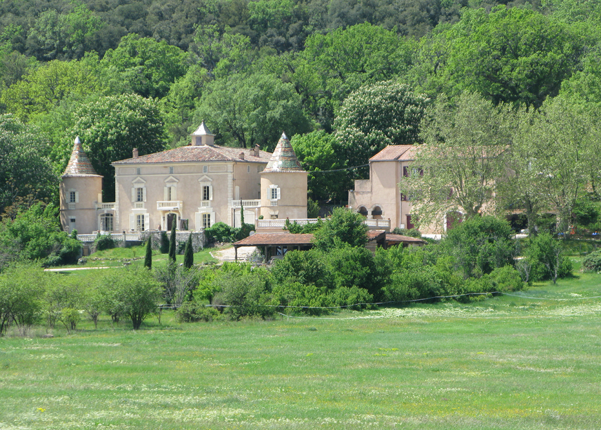
Castle of l’Eouvière, May 2008

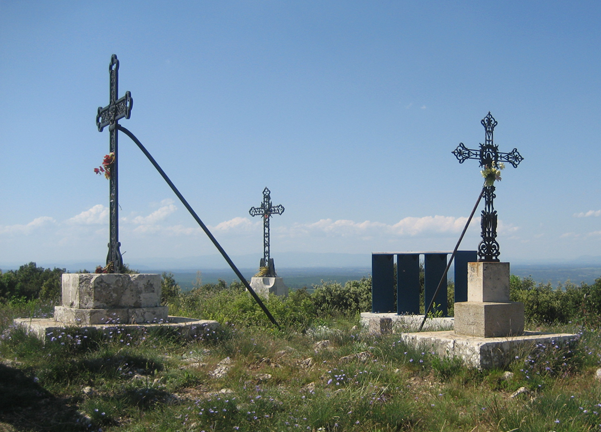
The Three Crosses, September 2010

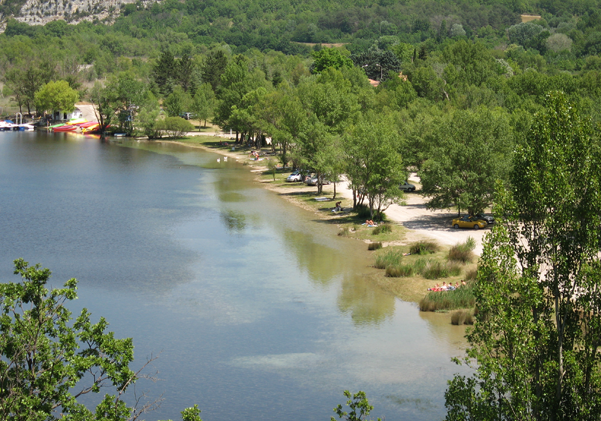
Lake of Montmeyan-Quinson, August 2010

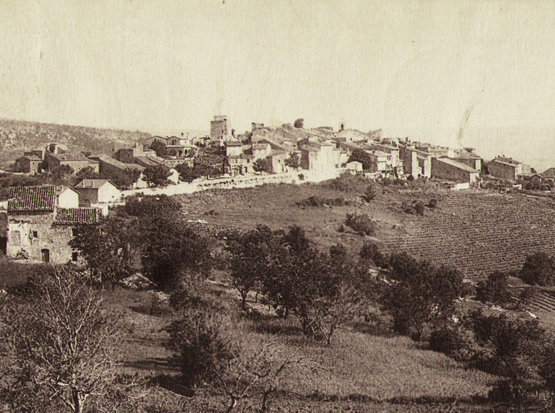
South side, 1933

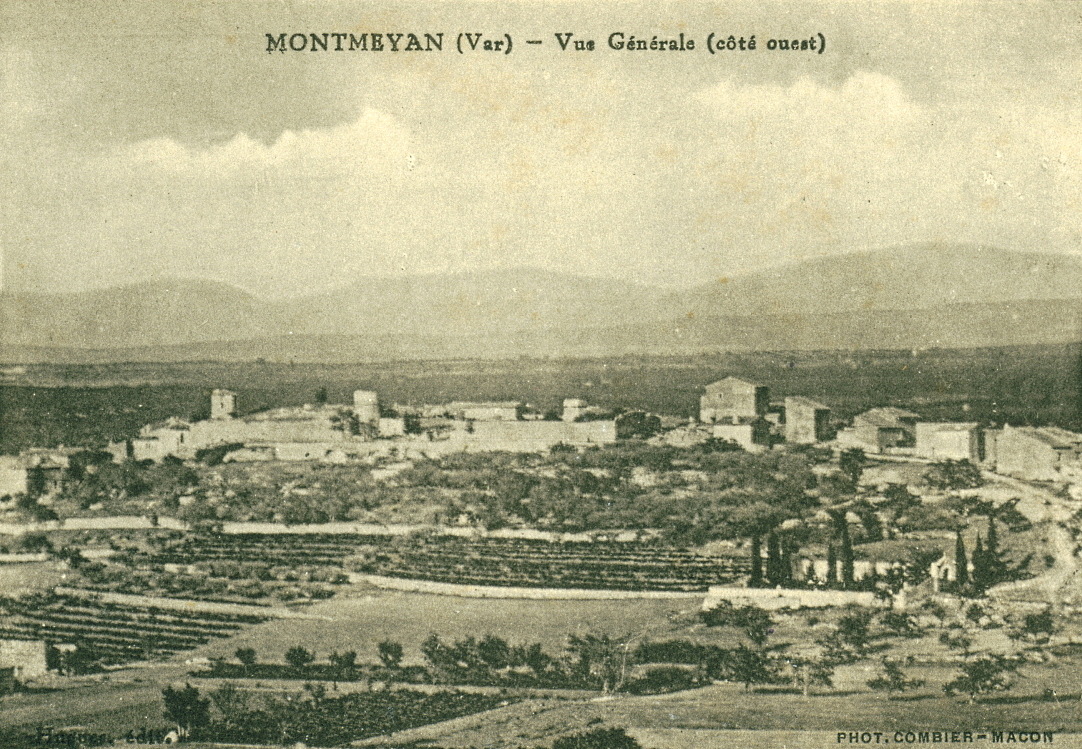
West side, 1905

== Famous Citizens ==
- Rolland de Castellane (1560-1637), seigneur of Montmeyan, deputy of the nobility to the Estates-General in 1614, quoted in the works of Malherbe, was appointed twice provost of Marseille (1588 and 1615) and governor of Fréjus in 1624.
- Henri Breuil (1877-1961) is a pre-historian who gave his name to the shelter Paleolithic discovered north of the village near the Verdon.
- Victor Nicolas (1906-1979) is a sculptor who created many monuments in the departments of Var and Alpes Maritimes.
- Roger Taillefer (1907-1999) is a member of the French Resistance who provided military intelligence.
- Charles Michel (born 1975) is the president of the European Council, former Prime Minister of Belgium, who regularly stays in the municipality where there is a family property.
