= École nationale supérieure des arts décoratifs =

French art school

Coordinates: 48°50′35″N 2°20′41″E

École des Arts décoratifs - PSL
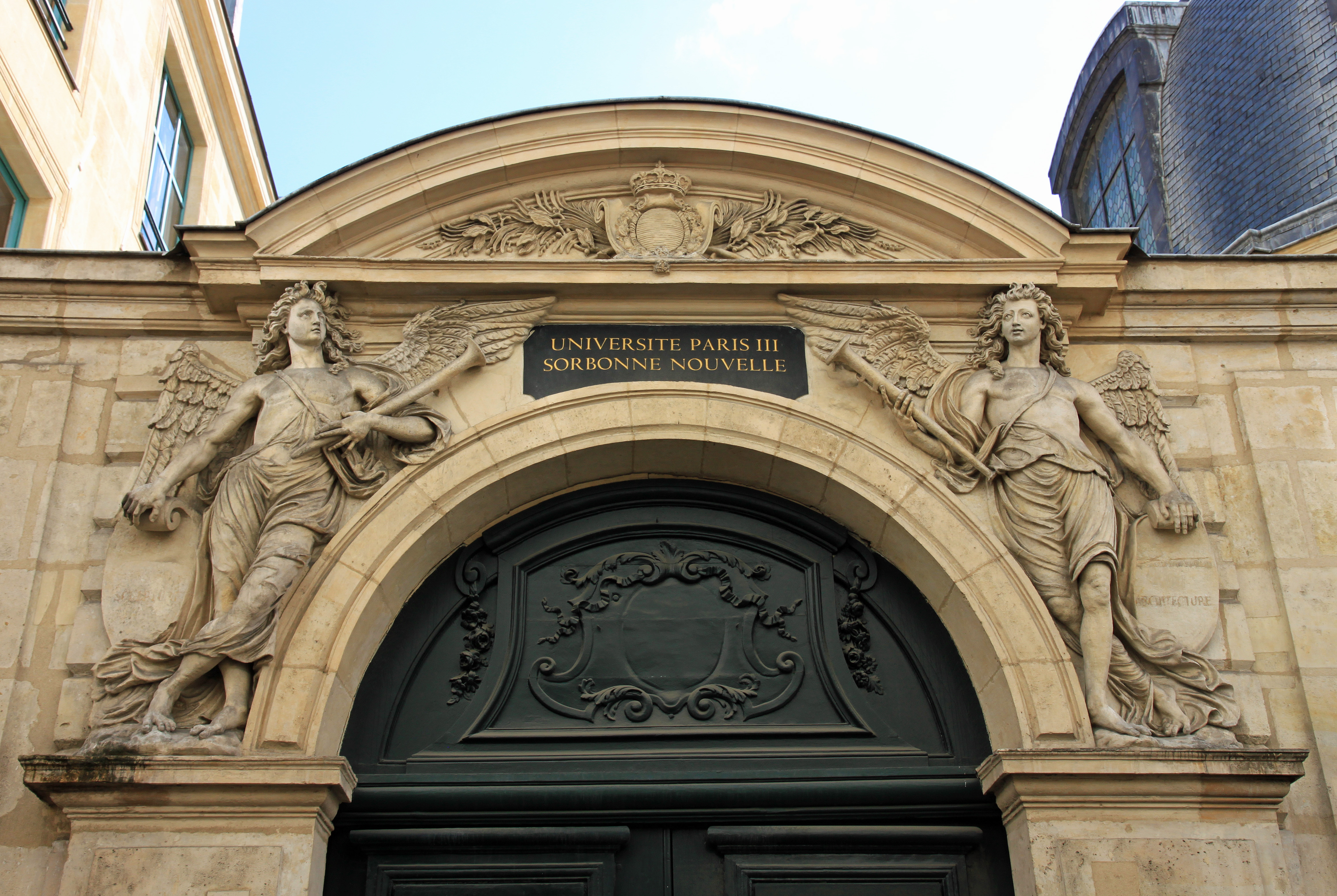
- Former entrance to the royal school of drawing under Louis XV.
- Type: Grande école
- Established: 1766 – Royal Free School of Art; 1877 – National School of Decorative Arts; 1927 – National Higher School of Decorative Arts
- Parent institution: PSL Research University
- Academic affiliations: PSL Research University
- Director: Marc Partouche
- Students: 700+
- Postgraduates: Masters, agrégation, Ph.D
- Location: Paris, France
- Website: www.ensad.fr

The École nationale supérieure des Arts Décoratifs (French pronunciation: [ekɔl nɑsjɔnal sypeʁjœʁ dez‿aʁ dekɔʁatif]; ÉnsAD) also known as Arts Decos' and École des Arts décoratifs, is a public grande école of art and design, constituent member of PSL Research University. The school is located in the Rue d'Ulm in Paris.

== Profile ==
The École nationale supérieure des arts décoratifs played a major role in the development of the Art Deco design movement in the 1920s and in the creation of new design concepts. The School has an international reputation for its teaching in the fields of animation, photography, scenography, industrial design, communication design, interactive design, video, interior design, fashion, textile and engraving.

== History ==
The E.N.S.A.D. has its roots in the École royale gratuite de dessin (Royal Free School of Design) founded in 1766 by Jean-Jacques Bachelier, confirmed in 1767 by letters patent from King Louis XV. Its founder's aim was to develop crafts relating to the arts in order to improve the quality of manufactured goods. Through a rigorous and demanding apprenticeship in the Arts, the school strove to combine technique and culture, intelligence and sensitivity, so as to enable the more gifted artisans to develop into creative artists. After several changes of name, in 1877 the school became the National School of Decorative Arts (École nationale des arts décoratifs) before taking its present name of ENSAD (École nationale supérieure des arts décoratifs) in 1927.

== Directors ==
- Charles Edmond Kayser, 1938–?,
- Léon Deshairs, ?−1940, and 1943–1945,
- Léon Moussinac, 1945–1959,
- Jacques Adnet, 1959–1970,
- Michel Tourlière,
- Richard Peduzzi, 1990–2002,
- Patrick Raynaud, 2002–2008,
- Geneviève Gallot, 2008–2013,
- Marc Partouche, 2014–2018,
- Emmanuel Tibloux, 2018–present

== Notable teachers ==
- Pierre Bernard (graphic designer)
- Rosa Bonheur
- Cassandre
- Marcel Gromaire
- Jean-Philippe Lenclos
- André Lurçat
- Pierre Louis Rouillard, professor of sculpture from 1840 to 1881
- Joseph-André Motte furniture and interior designer
- Philippe Starck
- Roger Tallon

== Notable alumni ==
- Philippe Apeloig, graphic designer
- Ximena Armas, painter
- Antun Augustinčić, sculptor
- Pierre Bismuth, artist
- François Boisrond, painter
- Ronan Bouroullec, designer
- Yvonne Canu, painter
- Jean Chaleyé, painter and lace designer
- Nina Childress, painter
- Claude Closky, artist
- Sylvie Covey, artist, printmaker, and author
- Paul Coze, artist
- Leon Dabo, painter
- Sylvaine Dampierre, documentary filmmaker
- Léon Delarbre, painter, museum curator
- Philippe Dupuy, cartoonist
- Benoît-Pierre Émery, graphic designer
- Vincent Ferniot, actor, presenter, writer
- Jean-Paul Goude, photographer and director
- René Georges Hermann-Paul, artist and illustrator
- John Howe, illustrator and author
- Camille Henrot, artist
- Pierre Huyghe, artist
- Jean Jansem, painter
- Marcel Ichac, director and photographer
- Richard Isanove, cartoonist
- Claire Keane, illustrator
- Fernand Léger, artist
- Georges Léonnec, illustrator
- Annette Messager, artist
- Florence Miailhe, animator
- Morteza Momayez, graphic designer
- Sarah Monfort, costume designer
- Fernand Mourlot, lithographer, publisher
- Thierry Mugler, fashion designer
- Victor Nicolas, sculptor
- Francis Picabia, artist
- Arthur de Pins, director of the 2000 animated short film Geraldine
- Charles Ethan Porter, painter
- Robert Poughéon, painter
- Alfred-Georges Regner, painter engraver
- Pierre Roy, painter
- Émile Savitry, painter, photographer
- Jacques Tardi, cartoonist
- Raymond Templier, jewelry designer
- Adrien Voisin (1890–1979), American sculptor.
- Jean-Didier Wolfromm, critic, writer
- Cédric Blaisbois, director, graphic designer
- Rostislav Doboujinsky, Russian designer
- Nachiket Barve, Indian Fashion designer
- Pierre Vigoureux, artist
