= Sarah Monfort =

French costume designer

- Born: 1980 (age 45–46); Paris
- Known for: Costume designer

Sarah Monfort is a costume designer.

== Biography ==
After a year in the atelier de Sèvres, she graduated from the École nationale supérieure des arts décoratifs, specialized in fashion in Gaspard Yurkievich's class, whom she followed to Rodier. She started at an internship at Vanessa Bruno, Karine Arabian et Malhia et Estrella Archs from Cacharel. She is related to the producer Christine Vachon.

== Filmography ==
=== Costume designer ===
==== Long feature films ====
- 2006: Marie-Antoinette
- 2007: I'm not there
- 2010: Inception
- 2011: Les Bien-Aimés
- 2011: Un jour
- 2011: Le premier homme
- 2011: 360
- 2011: Hugo Cabret
- 2011: Sherlock Holmes
- 2011: L'air de rien
- 2013: Duo d'escrocs
- 2013: Jacky au royaume des filles
- 2014: Helix Aspersa
- 2014: 15 francs, des fleurs et une culotte
- 2015: Love

==== Short film ====
- 2010: Ton sale chien
- 2010: Aglaée
- 2010: Antonin et les oiseaux
- 2010: La France qui se lève tôt
- 2011: Déjeuner à Foisse
- 2011: Alexis Ivanovitch, vous êtes mon héros
- 2011: Les poissons préfèrent l'eau du bain
- 2012: La ville est calme
- 2012: Tennis elbow
- 2012: Bal de nuit
- 2013: L'homme qui en connaissait un rayon

==== Television ====
- 2007: Viver a vida
- 2013: Castle

==== Documentaire ====
- 2007: Planet B-boy

=== Actress ===
- 2003: Rien, voilà l'ordre by Jacques Baratier: nurse
