= François de Porchères d'Arbaud =

French poet

François d'Arbaud de Porchères (1590-1640) was a French poet.

== Early life ==
François de Porchères d'Arbaud was born on December 20, 1590, in Brignoles in the French department of Var. He went to Paris to study poetry under François de Malherbe, who left him half of his library in his will, the other half went to Racan.

== Career ==
De Porchères d'Arbaud was the other of many works, of which others have since published in modern anthologies. He was often confused with Honorat de Porchères Laugier, who was also a member of the Académie Française.

In 1634, he became one of the first twenty members of the Académie française. Despite a pension of £600 that the Cardinal Richelieu bestowed upon him, he lived all of his life in relative poverty.

== Death ==
De Porchères d'Arbaud died on May 5, 1640, in Burgundy, France.

== Sonnet ==
Sur l'Esprit malin

=== French ===
Nature, prête-moi tes plus noires couleurs,
Fournis, pour mon tableau, le sang d'une panthère,
Le venin d'un dragon, le fiel d'une vipère,
D'un crocodile enfin, et l'écume et les pleurs.

Je veux peindre, aujourd'hui, l'artisan des malheurs,
Le lion, le serpent, le monstre sanguinaire,
Qui nous fit tous mortels, en tuant notre père,
Et, par lui, nous causa d'éternelles douleurs.

Il nous ouvrit la voie aux éternelles flammes,
Et ce bourreau cruel et des corps et des âmes,
Détruisit, d'un seul coup, le bonheur des humains.

C'est à toi-même, ô Dieu ! que Satan fit outrage.
L'Homme est ta ressemblance et l'œuvre de tes mains :
Venge l'Original, en sauvant son image.

=== English ===
Nature, lend me your darkest colours,
Provide, the blood of a panther for my table,
The venom of a dragon, the bile of a viper,
Finally a crocodile, and bubble up its tears.

Today, I want to paint the artisan of sadness,
The lion, the snake, the bloodthirsty monster,
Who makes us all mortal, in killing our father,
And by his, causes us eternal hardships.

He opened us to the path of the eternal flames,
And the cruel executioner and the bodies and the souls,
Destroyed, in one blow, the happiness of humanity.

It's you, yourself that Satan outrages,
Man is your resemblance and the work of your hand:
Punish the original, by saving his image.

== Publications ==
- Le Rosaire de la Ste Vierge (1627)
- Paraphrase des Psaumes graduels. Par Franc̜ois d'Arbaut, escuyer, sieur de Porcheres (1633)
- Au Roy Ode (1633)
- Ode à monseigneur le cardinal duc de Richelieu (1636)
- Les Pseaumes de la pénitence de David, mis en vers français par Fr. Porchères d'Arbaud (1651)

=== Anthologies ===
- Premier recueil de diverses poésies tant du feu sieur de Sponde que des sieurs Du Perron, de Bertaud, de Porchères et autres, non encor imprimées, recueillies par Raphaël Du Petit Val (1603) Texte en ligne
- Le Parnasse des plus excellens poëtes de ce temps published by Mathieu Guillemot (1618)
- Rimes de d'Arbaud-Porchères, éditées pour la première fois avec ses notes scientifiques et un fac-simile de son écriture By Philippe d'Arbaud-Jouques (1855) Texte en ligne
- Six sonnets du dix-septième siècle By Saint-Amant, Sarrazin, Porchères d'Arbaud, Théophile de Viau and Des Barreaux, ou Tableau des humeurs françoises environ l'an de grâce 1650, agrémenté de figures et d'ornemens inventés et gravés sur bois par le sieur Maximilien Vox (1923)
