= Cédric Blaisbois =

French filmmaker

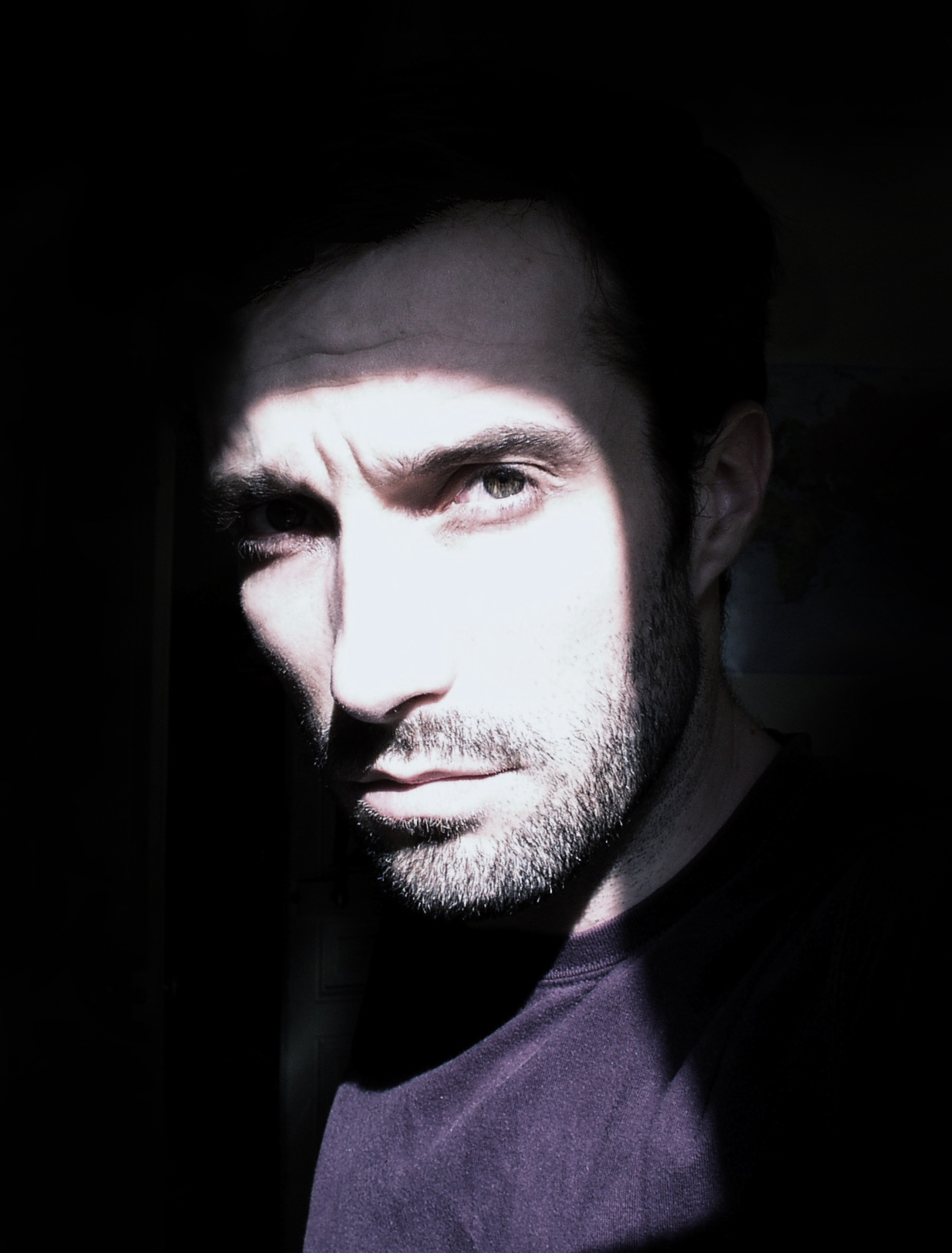
- Born: Paris, France
- Education: ENSAD (Master of Fine Arts)
- Occupations: Filmmaker, art director, cinematographer, actor, producer
- Years active: 2011–present
- Spouse: Solweig Rediger-Lizlow (m. 2008–2014)
- Website: www.cedricblaisbois.com

Cédric Blaisbois (French pronunciation: [seɪdrɪk bleɪˈbwɑː]) is a French filmmaker known for his organic and visceral dark visual style. Blaisbois has primarily directed short films, music videos for electronica acts such as Huoratron and Mr Flash. He has also designed album artwork for a variety of musicians.

== Early work ==
After graduating in Fine Arts from the ENSAD, Blaisbois work as a graphic designer blending modern elements with classic design to produce artwork for record labels and French house artists such as Kavinsky. Blaisbois then began directing, retooling his design experience to shoot commercials and music videos inspired by art house directors such as John Carpenter, David Cronenberg and William Friedkin. Blaisbois signed with Partizan Midi-Minuit production company in 2010.

== Music videos ==
Blaisbois has had ties to Ed Banger Records. since his first production "Flesh" for Mr Flash. Video for Huoratron's "Corporate Occult" is perhaps his best known. In 2016, Billboard ranked "Corporate Occult" number 1 as "the scariest, goriest, freakiest, most intense music video ever."

== Commercials ==
Blaisbois has directed a handful of commercials for companies including Nissan, Lacoste and Canal+. Converse "Shoes are Boring" is the most atypical one, made specifically for Mother's Day in a comedic genre for the only time in his career.

== Short films ==
In 2019, Vice Media showed how Blaisbois narrated the nightlife of young Venezuelans in Nicolás Maduro's country, for his very first short film "Autocannibalism", depicting one night of partying in the most violent city in the world: Caracas, Venezuela.

== Personal life ==
In 2008, Blaisbois married model Solweig Rediger-Lizlow in Las Vegas. They divorced in 2014.

== Videography ==
- "Corporate Occult" (2011) video for Huoratron
- "Flesh" (2011) video for Mr Flash
- "Together We Play" (2013) video for Raveyards
- "Shoes are boring" (2013) – commercial for Converse
- "Autocannibalism" (2019) – Short Film
- "Balcón" (2020) – video for Famasloop
