= Sylvaine Dampierre =

French documentary filmmaker

- Education: École nationale supérieure des arts décoratifs
- Notable work: Le Pays à l’envers (2005); Paroles de Nègres (2020)
- Website: https://sylvainedampierre.com/

Sylvaine Dampierre is a French documentary filmmaker of Guadeloupean descent. Her film Paroles de Nègres (2020) was awarded the International Critics’ Award at the international documentary film festival Dok Leipzig and the Best Feature Documentary Award at the Trinidad and Tobago Film Festival (TTFF).

== Biography ==
Dampierre studied at the École nationale supérieure des arts décoratifs and joined Ateliers Varan in 1993. She worked as a film editor until 1998. In 1998, Dampierre created an internal television channel at the La Santé Prison in Paris, France.

Dampierre's father was born in Guadeloupe and her documentary Le Pays à l’envers [fr] (2005) explores the time of slavery in the archipelago and traces her family name. In 2010, Dampierre founded the non-profit audiovisual training company Varan Caraïbe in Guadeloupe with Gilda Gonfier.

Dampierre's film Paroles de Nègres (2020) was awarded the International Critics’ Award at the international documentary film festival Dok Leipzig and the Best Feature Documentary Award at the Trinidad and Tobago Film Festival (TTFF).

Dampierre has also collaborated with photographer Bernard Gomez on the design of photography books.

== Filmography ==
- Un Enclos (1999)
- Pouvons-nous vivre ici? (2002), about French scientists working at Chernobyl
- Green Guérilla (2003)
- Le Pays à l’envers [fr] (2005)
- Piazza mora (2013)
- Paroles de Nègres (2020), awarded the International Critics’ Award at the international documentary film festival Dok Leipzig and the Best Feature Documentary Award at the Trinidad and Tobago Film Festival (TTFF)
