= François Just Marie Raynouard =

French dramatist and linguist (1761–1836)

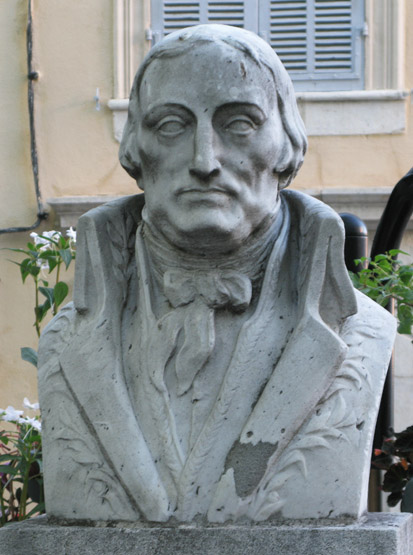
- Monument by the sculptor Victor Nicolas
- Born: 18 September 1761; Brignoles, France
- Died: 27 October 1836 (aged 75); Passy, France
- Occupations: Dramatist, playwright, philologist, linguist

François Just Marie Raynouard (18 September 1761 – 27 October 1836) was a French dramatist and linguist.

== Biography ==
Raynouard was born at Brignoles in Provence, trained for the bar, and practiced at Draguignan. In 1791 he represented the department of Var in the Legislative Assembly, but after the fall of his party, the Girondists, he went into hiding. Discovered and imprisoned in Paris, he wrote his play Caton d'Utique (1794) during his imprisonment.

In 1803 he won the Institut de France's poetry prize. Éléonore de Bavière and Les Templiers were accepted by the Comédie-Française. Les Templiers was produced in 1805, and, over the opposition of Geoffroy, was a great success. Elected to the Académie Française in 1807 and to the Académie des Inscriptions et Belles-Lettres in 1816, Raynouard was admitted secrétaire perpétuel of the Académie Française in 1817. From 1806 to 1814 he represented the department of Var in the Corps législatif.

Raynouard wrote other plays, one of which, Les États de Blois (acted 1810), offended Napoleon by its freedom of speech. Realizing that the public taste had changed and that Romanticism would triumph, Raynouard abandoned the stage and devoted himself to linguistic studies. His researches into Provençal were to an extent inaccurate, but his enthusiasm and perseverance opened the way for the study of the subject.

Raynouard is sometimes called the founder of Romance linguistics, although his contribution was marked by a fundamental misconception: he believed that the Romance languages were derived from a common post-Latin language, which he called le roman, and not directly from Latin, as is in fact the case. Raynouard's chief works are Choix de poésies originales des troubadours (6 vols., 1816–1821), of which the sixth volume, Grammaire comparée des langues de l'Europe latine, dans leurs rapports avec la langue des troubadours (1821), was separately published; Lexique roman ou dictionnaire de la langue des troubadours comparée avec les autres langues de l'Europe latine (6 vols., 1838–1844). He spent the last years of his life at Passy.

Raynouard was Officer of the Legion of Honour. In the 16th arrondissement of Paris, a street and a square have been named after him. In Brignoles, a monument pays tribute to him near the house he was born in, and the secondary school (lycée) and a boulevard have been named after him.

== Works ==
=== Theatre ===
- Caton d’Utique, tragedy, 1794
- Les Templiers, tragedy, premiered at the Comédie-Française le 24 floréal an XIII (14 May 1805). Read online
- Éléonore de Bavière, tragedy, 1805
- Les États de Blois ou la mort du duc de Guise, tragedy, 1809
- Don Carlos, tragedy, non-presented
- Débora, tragedy, non-presented
- Charles Ier, tragedy, non-presented
- Jeanne d’Arc à Orléans, tragedy, non-presented

=== Poetry ===
- Socrate dans le temple d’Aglaure, 1803 read online
- L'immolation des templiers

=== History ===
- Recherches sur l’antiquité de la langue romane, 1816
- Éléments de la grammaire de la langue romane, 1816
- La Grammaire des troubadours, 1816
- Des troubadours et les cours d’amour, 1817
- Grammaire comparée des langues de l’Europe latine dans leurs rapports avec la langue des troubadours, 1821
- Choix des poésies originales des troubadours, 6 vol., 1816–1821
- Lexique de la langue des troubadours, 1824
- Histoire du droit municipal en France, sous la domination romaine et sous les trois dynasties, 1829
- Nouveau choix des poésies originales des troubadours, 1836–1844
- Lexique roman, 6 vol., 1838–1844
  - Tome 1
  - Tome 2, A-C
  - Tome 3, D-K
  - Tome 4, L-P
  - Tome 5, Q-Z
  - Tome 6, Appendice, vocabulaire
