= Jean-Philippe Lenclos =

French designer-colorist (born 1938)

- Born: March 5, 1938
- Occupation: Designer-Colorist

Jean-Philippe Lenclos (born March 5, 1938) is a French designer-colorist and founder of Atelier 3D Couleur, a studio based in Paris, France. He has been referred to as "a new kind of artist required by modern society; a color designer." He has exhibited his work in Tokyo, London, Paris, and Lisbon, and his work is on permanent display at the national museum for modern art of France in Paris, within the Supergraphics and Architecture departments. Lenclos was a professor at l’Ecole Nationale Superieure des Art Decoratifs (EnsAD) in Paris for 35 years and was appointed Chevalier de l'Ordre des Arts et des Lettres in 1981.

== Early life and education ==
Jean-Philippe was born in Beuvry, Pas-de-Calais, France, in 1938. His father, Camille Lenclos (1903-1985), was a respected designer of religious furniture whose work was exhibited in 2006 at the Hotel de Beaulaincourt in Béthune: Lefebvre-Lenclos, un atelier de sculpture en Artois, 100 ans d’art sacré 1805-1905 (A Sculpture Workshop in Artois, 100 years of sacred art 1805-1905).

In 1960 he received an educational scholarship from the government of Japan and completed his studies at the Kyoto City University Fine Arts School. “I also studied calligraphy. This allowed me to discover the notion of graphic and pictorial space where the white has as much importance as the black.” –Lenclos. While in Kyoto he became interested in the symbolism and rhetoric of color. These ideas would eventually lead him to his study of his famous concept of Geography of Color.

He married Dominique Saguez de Breuvery in 1966. Dominique Lenclos (1942-2012) actively collaborated with her husband in his research. They have written many books on the geography of color, including Colors of the World and Windows of the World, the companion to Doors of the World.

== Practice (Atelier 3D Couleur) ==
He founded l’Atelier 3D Couleur (design and color studio) in Paris in 1978, which he directed for 30 years. This studio was created for the conception and application of color in three domains: environment, architecture, and industrial products. During his 30 years there he worked on many projects in collaboration with companies, municipalities, and architects. Lenclos has worked with l'Oréal, Shiseido, Nissan, Yamaha, Honda, Hyundai, Renault, Michelin, Airbus Aerospatiale, Phillips, Rowenta, Krups, Le Printemps, La Samaritaine, and many other notable organizations. In 2004, Atelier 3D Couleur was purchased by Robert Le Héros.

Jean-Philippe Lenclos was featured as the world expert in color in 2012 TV commercials for Samsung Galaxy II in a project called “Colors of Seoul”.

== Research (Geography of Color) ==
One of his most famous projects was his concept of Geography of Color. Lenclos and his wife Dominique published their first book Couleurs de la France, Maisons et Paysages, with Le Moniteur in 1982. They went on to write many books based on his concept of Geography of Color, and many are still in print in French as well as in English, Korean, and Japanese.

- Maisons du Monde, Couleurs et Décors dans l'Habitat Traditionnel. Published by Editions du Moniteur, 2007 (ISBN 2-281-19353-5),
- Windows of the World. W. W. Norton & Company, New York, London, 2005 (ISBN 0-393-73188-X),
- Doors of the World. W. W. Norton & Company, New York, London, 2005 (ISBN 978-0-393-73187-3),
- Colors of the World. W.W.Norton & co, New York, London, 2004 (ISBN 0-393-73147-2),
- Couleurs de la France, Géographie de la Couleur. Published by Editions du Moniteur, 2003 (ISBN 2-281-19205-9)
- Fenêtres du Monde. Published by Editions du Moniteur), 2001 (ISBN 2-281-19149-4),
- Portes du Monde. Published by Editions du Moniteur, 2001 (ISBN 2-281-19148-6),
- Couleurs du Monde, Géographie de la Couleur. Published by Editions du Moniteur, 1999 (ISBN 2-281-19116-8),
- Couleurs de l'Europe, Géographie de la Couleur. Published by Editions du Moniteur, 1995 (ISBN 2-281-19206-7),
- Couleurs de la France, Maisons et Paysages. Published by Editions du Moniteur, 1982.

== Teaching and Honors ==
In 1968 Lenclos started teaching color theory at the École Nationale Supérieure des Arts Décoratifs (Ensad). Jean-Philippe L

He was appointed Chevalier de l'Ordre des Arts et des Lettres, by Jack Lang, Minister of Culture, (1981).

The book "Les Couleurs de la France, Maisons et Paysages" received: The Georges Pompidou award, awarded by the High Committee of the French Language, The Charles Maunoir award from the Société de Géographie, The award of 1983-1984 for "l'International Color Design" given by the Design Center of Stuttgart, The bronze medal of Les Plus Beaux Livres Du Monde Entier exhibition at the international Trade Show in Leipzig, in 1984.

== Exhibitions ==
=== Monographic Exhibitions (Work and Research) ===
In 1972 he exhibited a synthetic study on the Colors of Tokyo at the Ichiban Kan Gallery in Tokyo following a past request from Masaomi Unagami, director of the Color Planning Center of Tokyo. He received his first real recognition in France in 1977 with a monographic exhibition (in the department of the Centre de Creation Industriel) within the Centre Georges-Pompidou, justly inaugurated as: La Géographie de la Couleur. François Barré, who was head of the CCI at this time, was interested in Lenclos’ pragmatic approach. This work had already been exhibited in 1974 in London as part of the exhibit “France is Color”. It was then exhibited in 1978 in Lisbon and Porto (at the Foundation Calouste Gulbenkian), in 1982 in Paris (at the Musée des Art Décoratifs) as "Géographie de la Couleur", and in 1998 in Tokyo (at the Xsitehill Gallery) as Geography of Color.

=== Group exhibitions ===
In 1967 at the Salon des Artistes Décorateurs in Paris, he exhibited an auditorium designed for a cultural center. The asymmetric arrangement of this auditorium was inspired by a ceremonial tea chamber in Japan. In 1970 he was in charge of all the color and signs for the French Pavilion within the International Exhibition of Osaka and in 1974 at the Design Center (British Council) in London, he was part of the exhibition France in color.

=== Centre Georges Pompidou ===
One hundred and thirty of Jean-Philippe Lenclos’s works have been a part of the Centre Georges Pompidou’s permanent collection since 2011. Some of his work is currently exhibited in the “Architecture, Design, and Colors” section of the Musée National d'Art Moderne in Paris.

== Painter ==
While pursuing his career as a designer colorist, Jean-Philippe has always kept up with his work as a painter in watercolor and oil. His research centered on color and on such subjects as the countryside and still life.

== Works on Jean-Philippe Lenclos ==
Three monographic works have been published on Lenclos In 1989, Geography of Color was published by San’ei Shobo in Tokyo. In 1991 Geography of Color was published by Kukje Publishing House in Seoul and in 1999 Song Jian-Ming dedicated Color Design in France to Lenclos. This monograph was published by Shanghai people’s Fine Arts Publishing House (ISBN 7-5322-2189-X/J.269).

In 2006, a doctoral thesis on the history of art recognized the contributions of Lenclos. The thesis, titled ‘Jean-Philippe Lenclos, Designer Coloriste’ was supported by Cloé Fontaine at the Université Paris 1 Panthéon-Sorbonne. The 600-page thesis was guided by Gérard Monnier and is available under the reference number 06PA10720.
