= Rodier =

Rodier is a French surname. Notable people with the surname include:

- Charles-Séraphin Rodier (disambiguation), multiple people
- Clément Rodier (1839–1904), French Christian missionary
- Denis Rodier (born 1963), Canadian comics artist
- Derek Rodier (born 1959), Scottish footballer
- Édouard-Étienne Rodier (1804–1840), Canadian lawyer and politician
- François Pierre Rodier (1854–1913), French colonial governor
- Yves Rodier (born 1967), Canadian cartoonist
