= Brignoles =

Subprefecture of Var, Provence-Alpes-Côte d'Azur, France

Brignoles Brinhòla (Occitan)
- Subprefecture and commune
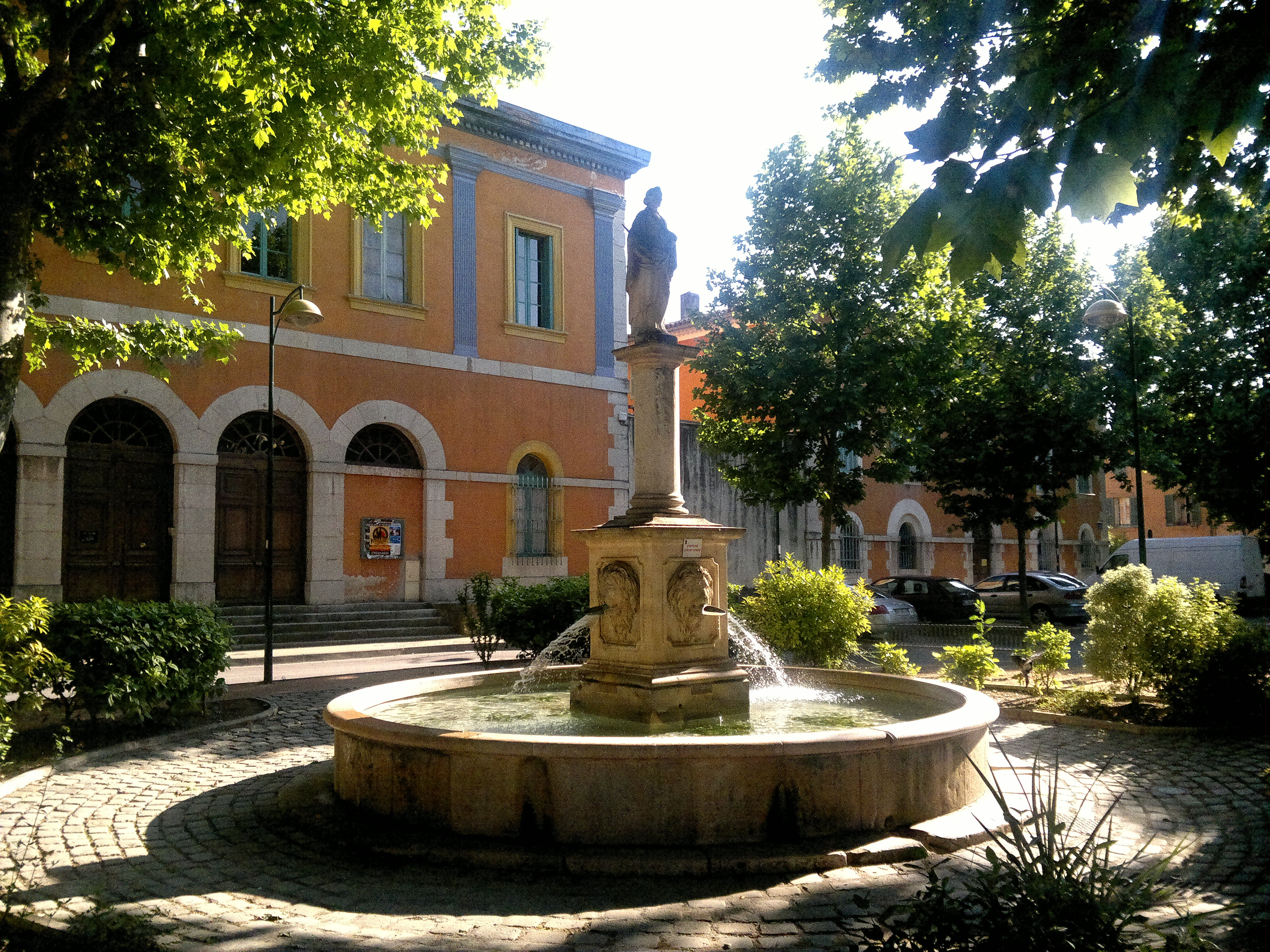
- Place du Palais de Justice

- Coat of arms
- Location of Brignoles
- Location within France Location within Provence-Alpes-Côte d'Azur
- Coordinates: 43°24′21″N 6°03′41″E
- Country: France
- Region: Provence-Alpes-Côte d'Azur
- Department: Var
- Arrondissement: Brignoles
- Canton: Brignoles
- Intercommunality: CA de la Provence Verte

Government
  - Mayor (2020–2026): Didier Brémond (LR)
- Area^{1}: 70.53 km^{2} (27.23 sq mi)
- Highest elevation: 767 m (2,516 ft)
- Lowest elevation: 190 m (620 ft)
- Population (2023): 17,850
  - Density: 253.1/km^{2} (655.5/sq mi)
- Demonym: Brignolais
- Time zone: UTC+01:00 (CET)
  - Summer (DST): UTC+02:00 (CEST)
- INSEE/Postal code: 83023 /83170
- Website: www.brignoles.fr
- ^{1} French Land Register data, which excludes lakes, ponds, glaciers > 1 km^{2} (0.386 sq mi or 247 acres) and river estuaries.

Brignoles (French pronunciation: [bʁiɲɔl]; Occitan: Brinhòla) is a commune in the Var department in the Provence-Alpes-Côte d'Azur region of Southeastern France. Alongside Draguignan, it is one of two subprefectures in Var.

It was the summer residence of the counts of Provence; their castle dates from the thirteenth century.

== Population ==
Historical population
Year	Pop.	±% p.a.
1968	9,051	—
1975	9,995	+1.43%
1982	10,412	+0.59%
1990	11,239	+0.96%
1999	12,487	+1.18%
2007	15,679	+2.89%
2012	16,454	+0.97%
2017	17,179	+0.87%
2023	17,850	+0.64%
Source: INSEE

== Notable people ==
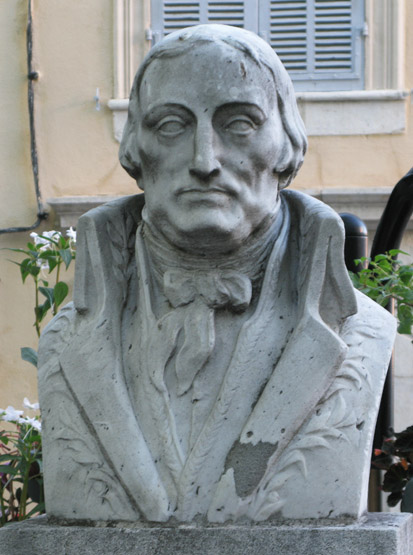
François Just Marie Raynouard, 2012

It is the residence of:

- George Clooney and Amal Clooney

It was the birthplace of:

- Antoine Albalat (1856–1935), writer specialising in French literature.
- Louis of Toulouse (1274–1297), bishop of Toulouse.
- François de Porchères d'Arbaud, (1590–1640), poet
- Louis Paul Baille de Saint-Pol (1768–1821), French soldier.
- François Guisol (1803–1874), poet and author.
- Fabrice Hadjadj (born 1971), philosopher and dramatist, teacher at the Lycée Sainte Jeanne d'Arc since 2002.
- Jean-Jacques Jauffret (born 1965), French film director.
- Joseph-Louis Lambot (1814–1887), the inventor of ferro-cement which led to the development of reinforced concrete.
- Catherine Matausch (born 1960), French journalist.
- Jean-Baptiste Maunier (born 1990), French actor.
- René Morizur (1944–2009), French musician, died and buried in Brignoles.
- Victor Nicolas (1906–1979), French sculptor who created many monuments in nearby departments.
- Joseph Parrocel (1646–1704), French painter.
- Christian Philibert (born 1965), French film director and screenwriter.
- François Just Marie Raynouard, (1761–1836) a French dramatist, linguist, writer and philologist.

=== Sport ===
- Amy Cissé (born 1969), retired international basketball player.
- Manu Diaz (born 1955), retired rugby union player.
- Louis Iglesias (born 2008), racing driver
- Jean-Jacques Marcel (1931–2014), French footballer.
- Patrick Valéry (born 1969), retired footballer.

== Twin towns and sister cities ==
Brignoles is twinned with:

- Bruneck, Italy
- Groß-Gerau, Germany
- Szamotuły, Poland
- Tielt, Belgium

== See also ==
- Communes of the Var department
