= Yvonne Canu =

French painter

- Education: Ecole des Arts Decoratifs
- Known for: Painting
- Movement: Neo-Impressionism

Yvonne Canu (9 Nov 1921–15 May 2007) was a French painter, considered part of Neo-Impressionism, who employed the technique of Pointillism in her works.

She was born to French parents in Meknes in Morocco, in 1921. She began her studies at the École des Arts Décoratifs in Paris, but they were interrupted by World War II.

The future pointillist met with artists such as Élisée Maclet and Tsuguharu Foujita, who introduced her to landscape painting and the principles of Impressionism. Later attended the Academie de la Grand Chaumiere alongside Ossip Zadkine.

Yvonne Canu began to present her works after the end of World War II, but it was only in 1955 that she finally came to neo-impressionism. Cañu made this decision under the impression of the painting "Un dimanche après-midi à l'le de la Grande Jatte" by Georges Seurat, one of the pioneers of this trend. In this direction (pointillism), she worked for most of her life, up to her death in 2007, in Fréjus, France.
