= Alfred-Georges Regner =

French painter

Alfred-Georges Regner (22 February 1902, in Amiens – 20 September 1987, in Bayeux) was a French surrealist painter and engraver.

== Books of Regner's work ==
- Georges Turpin. A-G. Regner. Les palettes nouvelles. Paris: R. Debresse, 1951. (in French)
- A. G. Regner: Œuvre gravé. Calais: Musée des beaux-arts et de la dentelle, 1991. (in French)
- Valérie Viscardi and Alfred-Georges Regner. Alfred-Georges Regner: Peintre-graveur, 1902–1987: Catalogue raisonné. Paris: Éditions d'art Somogy, 2002. ISBN 2-85056-578-4. (in French)
