= Charles-Séraphin Rodier =

Charles-Séraphin Rodier may refer to:

- Charles-Séraphin Rodier (mayor) (1797–1876), mayor of Montreal and legislative councillor of Quebec
- Charles-Séraphin Rodier Jr (1818–1890), his nephew, Canadian senator
