= Pierre Roy (painter) =

French painter (1880–1950)

Pierre Roy (10 August 1880 – 26 September 1950) was a French surrealist painter. He is known for his realistically painted compositions of ordinary objects such as fruits, vegetables, woolen reels, ears, seeds, eggs, and ribbons, all arranged in unexpected ways.

== Biography ==
He was the eldest of four children of the secretary of the management board of the Musée d'Arts de Nantes, all of whom became amateur painters. After gaining his baccalauréat at the local school he joined a firm of architects before enrolling at the Ecole des Beaux-Arts in Paris. Disappointed with the course, he left to work on the designs for the 1900 Paris Exposition.

In 1905, he decided to devote himself to painting, beginning in 1906 at the Salon of the Société Nationale des Beaux-Arts (SNBA), a painters collective. He exhibited in 1907, 1908, 1913 and 1914 at the Société des Artistes Indépendants. In 1925, he took part in the first exhibition by surrealist painters alongside Giorgio de Chirico, Max Ernst and Pablo Picasso, and in 1926 had his first solo exhibition. In 1933 he was appointed for five years as a naval artist.

An exhibition devoted to his work was held at the Galerie des Beaux-Arts in Paris in 1935, and his work was displayed at the 1937 World's Fair and the Montaigne Gallery in Paris in 1938. He travelled and exhibited in galleries around the world: in New York at the Brummer Gallery in 1930 and 1933, at the Julien Levy Gallery in 1932, at the Museum of Modern Art in New York in 1936, at the Carstairs Gallery in 1949, in London in 1934, at the Wildenstein Gallery and in Hawaii in 1939 at the Honolulu Academy of Arts.

In addition he created stage sets, several covers for Vogue magazine, and advertising posters.

== Work in public collections ==
- New York, Museum of Modern Art
  - Danger dans l'escalier (Danger on the stairs), 1928, oil on canvas, 91 × 60 cm MoMA
  - L'Heure d'été (Daylight Saving Time), 1929, oil on canvas, 54 × 38 cm MoMA
  - Country Fair, c.1930, oil on canvas, 41 x 33 cm MoMA
- Art Institute of Chicago
  - Still Life, 1938, oil on canvas, 35 × 27 cm AIC
- Philadelphia Museum of Art
  - Metric System, c.1933, oil on canvas, 146 x 99 cm PMA
- Tate Modern, London
  - A Naturalist's Study, 1928, oil on canvas, 92 x 65 cm Tate
  - Boris Anrep in his Studio, 65 Boulevard, Arago, 1949, oil on canvas, 65 x 50 cm Tate
- Nantes, France, Musée des Beaux-arts
  - Adrienne pêcheuse (Adrienne the Fisherwoman), 1919, oil on canvas, 52 × 35 cm History of Art
- Paris, Musée National d'Art Moderne
  - Une Journée à la campagne (A Day in the Countryside), 1931, oil on canvas, 33 x 55 cm History of Art

== Sources ==
- Pierre Roy, Musée des Beaux-Arts de Nantes et Somogy éditions d'art, Paris, 1994.
- Adam Biro and René Passeron, Dictionnaire général du surréalisme et de ses environs, Office du Livre, Fribourg, Switzerland and Presses universitaires de France, Paris, 1982, p. 370.
- Nicolas Blondel, « Les Folies douces de Monsieur Roy », Beaux Arts magazine, No 132, March 1995, p. 86 to 91.
- Article based on a translation of the equivalent article on French Wikipedia
