= Departmental Committee of Liberation =

Structure of the French Resistance

The Departmental Committee of Liberation (French: Comité départemental de libération; CDL) was a structure of the French Resistance. In 1944, in each French department, the Resistance unified around a civil resistance structure (the Committee) and a military one (the French Forces of the Interior). The Committees developed out of the desire of the MUR (Mouvements Unis de la Résistance, or MUR) and the Free French Forces in London under general De Gaulle to give political representation to the Resistance forces fighting in France. In each commune, a Local Committee of Liberation (Comité local de libération) represented the Departmental Committee of Liberation.

== Newspaper ==
The CDL created the daily newspaper, L'Appel with a radical socialist communist outlook. In December 1944, this became the newspaper, La Voix Républicaine.
