= Order of the Holy Ghost =

Catholic religious order, 1180–1783

Cross emblem of the order

The Order of the Holy Ghost (also known as Hospitallers of the Holy Spirit) was a Catholic religious order. It was founded in 1180 in Montpellier by Gui of Montpellier, the son of William VII of Montpellier, for the care of the sick by groups of lay people. Pope Innocent III recognised the order on 23 April 1198. It was originally based in Montpellier and in Rome. A small female remnant survives in Poland.

== History ==
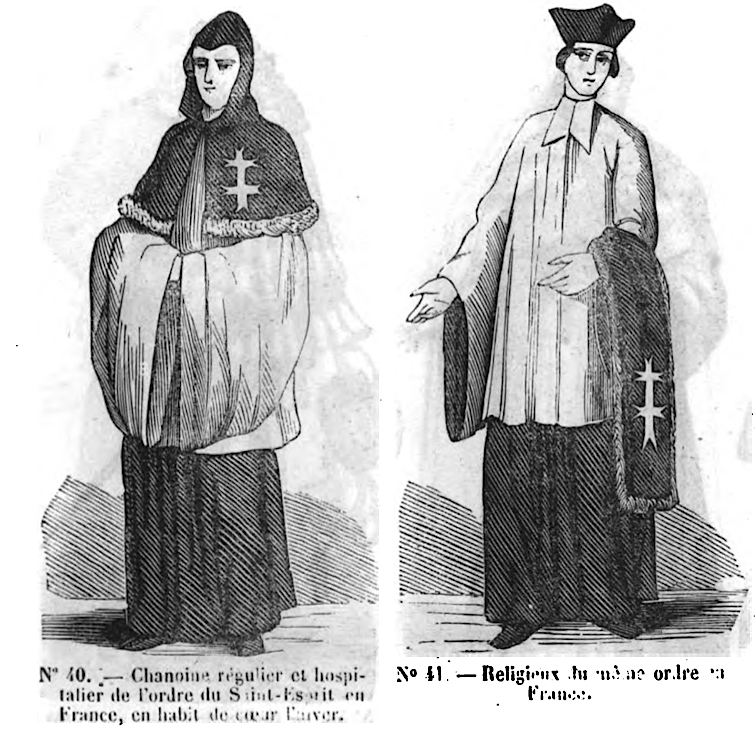
Canon and religious brother in France

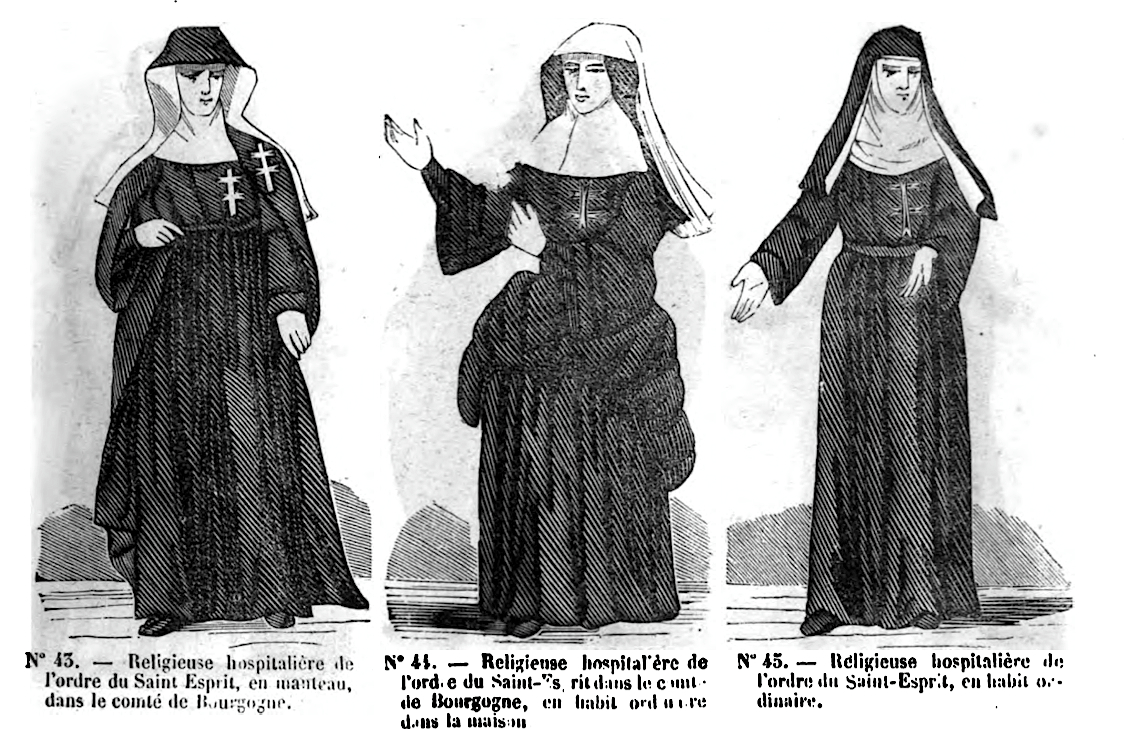
Three religious sisters in France

The order was responsible for running hospitals – known as Hospitals of the Holy Ghost – throughout Europe for centuries. At its prime, they numbered many hundreds. The wealth of its endowments made it a repeated target for the unscrupulous. The lay Knights of the Holy Ghost, formed on analogy to military orders but without military function, repeatedly attempted to divert the group's assets to their own use. Several popes made efforts to protect the order as a purely religious body, but Pope Pius V in 1619 re-created the Knights and again diverted the Order's assets into their hands. In 1692 Louis XIV redirected the property in the possession of the Knights for the benefit of his own Order of Our Lady of Carmel, in effect a pension fund for his retired soldiers.

The remaining religious members of the order were successful in obtaining an edict in 1700 which again confirmed the purely religious nature of the order and regaining the use of the funds for religious and charitable purposes. These now focused on a single institution, the original and by this time large Arcispedale di Santo Spirito in Sassia, the buildings of which dated from the time of Pope Sixtus IV (1471–84), which at its height was capable of accommodating over 1,000 patients, with additional spaces for contagious and for dangerously insane cases, employing more than 100 medical staff with an international remit.

Over time it became a municipal hospital for the inhabitants of Rome and later the original building became a museum and conference center. The Order in Rome gradually merged into the medical profession, though offshoots of the order survived into the 20th century in France.

The order was abolished in 1783.
