= Tavernes =

- Commune
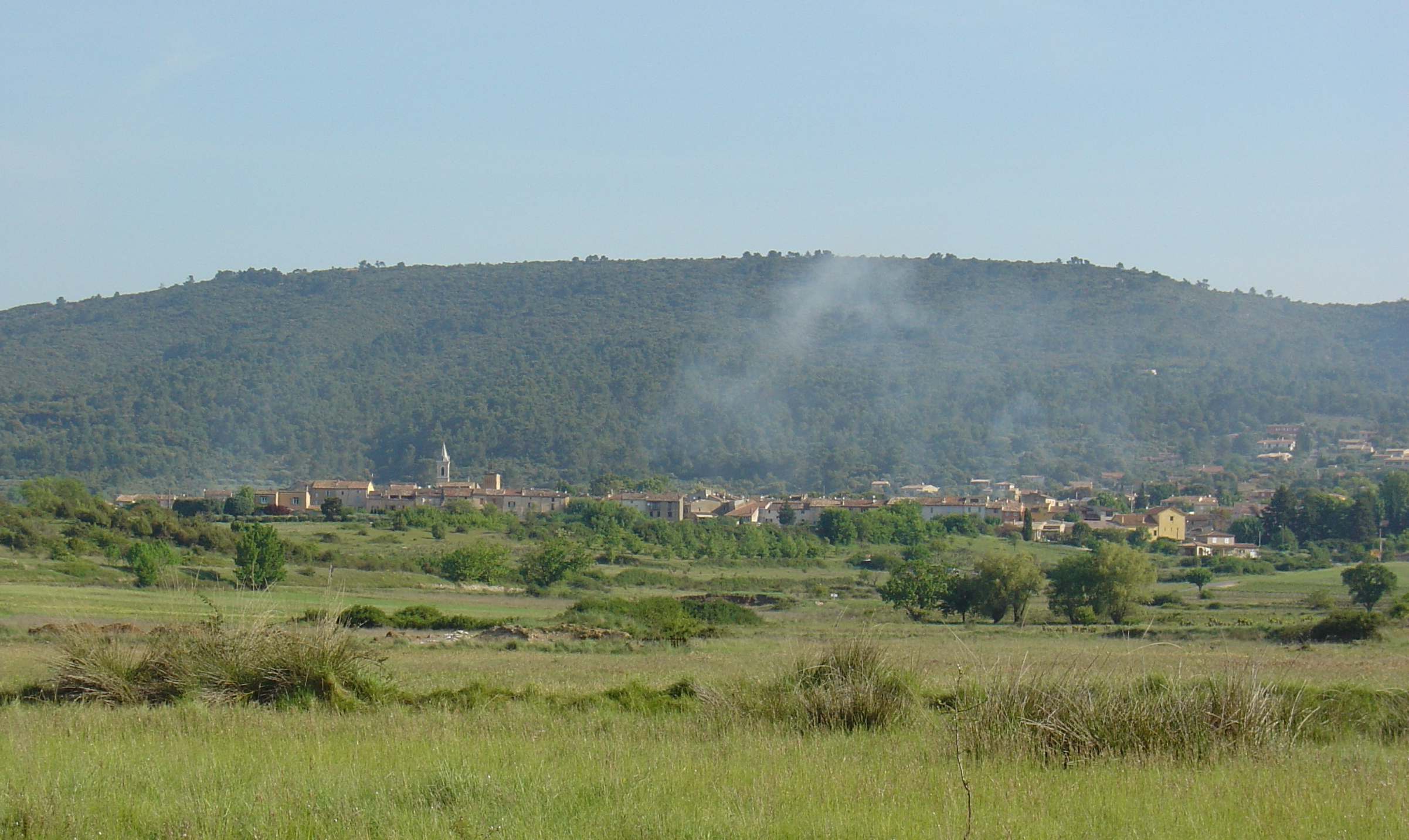
- A general view of the village

- Coat of arms
- Location of Tavernes
- Location within France Location within Provence-Alpes-Côte d'Azur
- Coordinates: 43°35′41″N 6°01′03″E
- Country: France
- Region: Provence-Alpes-Côte d'Azur
- Department: Var
- Arrondissement: Brignoles
- Canton: Flayosc

Government
  - Mayor (2020–2026): Didier Vauzelle
- Area^{1}: 31.15 km^{2} (12.03 sq mi)
- Elevation: 374 m (1,227 ft)
- Highest elevation: 691 m (2,267 ft)
- Lowest elevation: 300 m (980 ft)
- Population (2023): 1,492
  - Density: 47.90/km^{2} (124.1/sq mi)
- Time zone: UTC+01:00 (CET)
  - Summer (DST): UTC+02:00 (CEST)
- INSEE/Postal code: 83135 /83670
- ^{1} French Land Register data, which excludes lakes, ponds, glaciers > 1 km^{2} (0.386 sq mi or 247 acres) and river estuaries.

Tavernes (French pronunciation: [tavɛʁn]; Occitan: Tavèrnas) is a commune in the Var department in the Provence-Alpes-Côte d'Azur region in southeastern France.

== See also ==
- Communes of the Var department
