= List of translators into French =

This is a list of translators who have translated literature or non-fiction works into the French language.

== Translators ==
- Étienne Aignan
- Jacques Amyot – produced a famous version of Plutarch's Parallel Lives, later rendered into English by Sir Thomas North
- E. S. Ariel – translator of the Kural
- Charles Baudelaire – produced a famous and influential translation of the works of Edgar Allan Poe
- Louise Swanton Belloc – translator of English literature and memoirs
- Yves Bonnefoy – noted contemporary translator, particularly of English poetry
- Rose Celli – translated English works including Not So Quiet by Evadne Price
- Chateaubriand – translator of Milton's epic poem Paradise Lost into French prose
- Joséphine Colomb – translator of works from Italian
- Marguerite de Cambis – translator of works from Italian
- Marie De Cotteblanche (c. 1520 – c. 1584) – translator of works from Spanish
- Anne-Charlotte de Crussol de Florensac – translator of works by Alexander Pope and James Macpherson
- Anne Dacier – translator of classical Greek works
- Alain Daniélou – translator of the Kural, Silappathikaram, Manimekalai and other works
- Augustine De Rothmaler – translator of Johannes V. Jensen's Histoires du Himmerland
- Gnanou Diagou – translator of the Kural
- Adélaïde Dufrénoy – translator of classical poets Virgil and Horace from Latin
- John Durel – translator of the 1662 Book of Common Prayer
- Jean-Baptiste Benoît Eyriès – translator of travel and geography works, and Fantasmagoriana
- Antoine Galland – translator of the first European edition of the Arabian Nights
- François Gros – translator of the Paripatal (part of the Eight Anthologies)
- Antonine de Gérando – translator of Les Fils de l'homme au Cœur de Pierre, by Mór Jókai
- Jean Hyppolite – translator of Hegel who popularized his work
- Louis Jacolliot – translator of the Kural
- Georges Jean-Aubry
- Pierre-Eugène Lamairesse – translator of the Kural, Kamasutra and other Indian works
- Marie Léra – translator of Brewster's Millions by George Barr McCutcheon
- Leconte de Lisle – translator of classical Greek authors
- Jean Baptiste Lefebvre de Villebrune – translator of medical and philological works
- Stéphane Mallarmé – translator of the poetry of Edgar Allen Poe
- J. C. Mardrus – translator of the Arabian Nights
- Lucie Paul-Margueritte – translator of Dracula by Bram Stoker
- Nadine Ribault – translator of The Lagoon and Other Stories by Janet Frame
- William Woodville Rockhill – translator of the Tibetan version of the Udanavarga by the Sarvāstivādins
- Madeleine Rolland, translator of Tess of the d'Urbervilles by Thomas Hardy
- Danica Seleskovitch – conference translator; founder of the Interpretive Theory of Translation
- Boris Vian – translator of The Big Sleep by Raymond Chandler, The Lady in the Lake by Raymond Chandler and The World of Null-A by A. E. van Vogt
- Martina Wachendorff – translator from German and Hungarian
