= Hurtado =

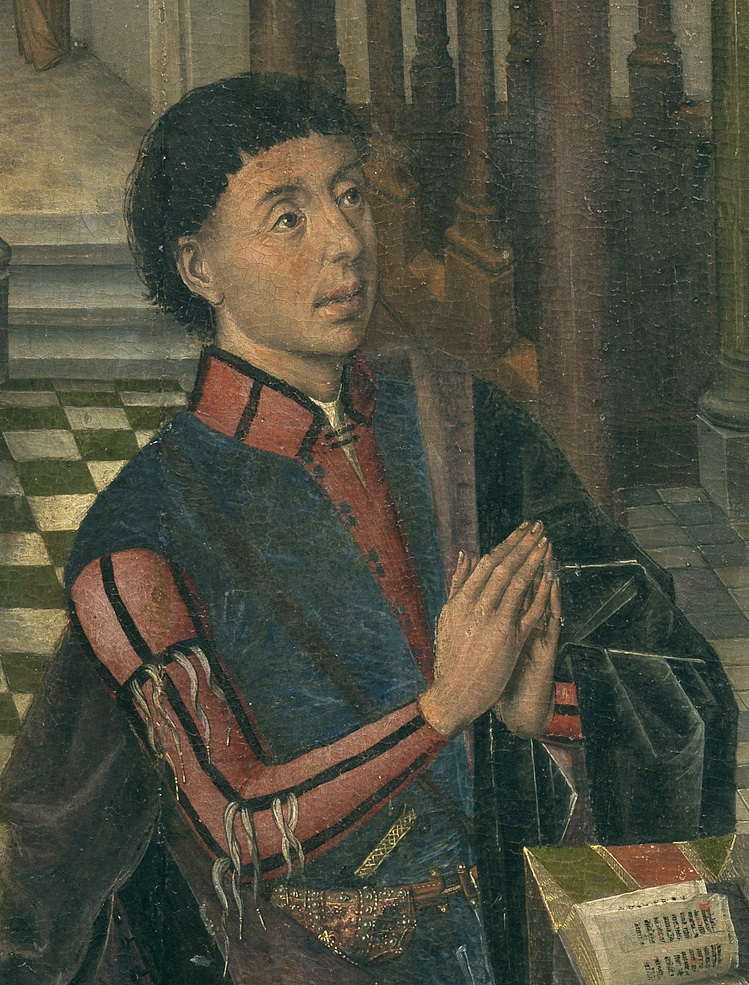
Diego Hurtado de Mendoza

Hurtado is a Spanish surname. Notable people with the surname include:

- Alberto Hurtado (1901–1952), Chilean Jesuit priest, lawyer, social worker and writer
- Álvaro Gómez Hurtado (1919–1995), Colombian lawyer, politician, and journalist
- Angélica Rivera Hurtado (born 1969), Mexican singer, model and telenovela actress
- Amparo Hurtado Albir, Spanish professor, translator and researcher
- Avilés Hurtado (born 1987), Colombian football player
- Caspar Hurtado (1575–1647), Spanish Jesuit theologian
- Cheo Hurtado (born 1960), Venezuelan musician
- Diosbelys Hurtado (born 1973), Cuban boxer
- Edison Hurtado (born 1972), Colombian wrestler
- Eduardo Hurtado (born 1969), Ecuadorian football player
- Edwin Hurtado (born 1970), American baseball player
- Erik Hurtado (born 1990), American football player
- Ezequiel Hurtado (1825–1890), Colombian soldier and politician
- Fabio Hurtado (born 1960), Spanish contemporary painter
- Ferran Hurtado (1951–2014), Spanish mathematician and computer scientist
- Gaspar Hurtado (1575–1647), Spanish Jesuit theologian
- Héctor Hurtado (born 1975), Colombian football player
- Iñaki Hurtado (born 1972), Spanish football player
- Iván Hurtado (born 1974), Ecuadorian football player
- Jan Carlos Hurtado (born 2000), Venezuelan football player
- Jaime Hurtado (1937–1999), Ecuadorian politician
- Jhon Kennedy Hurtado (born 1984), Colombian football player
- Joel Hurtado (born 2001), Dominican baseball player
- Jordi Hurtado (born 1958), Spanish radio and television presenter
- José María Robles Hurtado (1888–1927), Mexican priest
- Josetty Hurtado (born 1988), Peruvian actress and dancer
- Julián Hurtado (born 1979), Colombian football player
- Koob Hurtado (born 1985), Ecuadorian football player
- Larry Hurtado (1943–2019), American New Testament scholar
- Luchita Hurtado (1920–2020), Venezuelan-American artist
- Luis Hurtado (actor) (1898–1967), Spanish actor
- María Eugenia Hurtado Azpeitia, Mexican architect
- Melissa Hurtado (born 1988), American politician in California
- Miguel de la Madrid Hurtado, (1934 - 2012), Mexican president
- Miguel Hurtado (born 1978), Spanish astronomer and software developer
- Moisés Hurtado (born 1981), Spanish football player
- Osvaldo Hurtado (born 1939), President of Ecuador
- Osvaldo Hurtado (footballer) (born 1957), Chilean football player
- Paolo Hurtado (born 1990), Peruvian football player
- Ricardo Hurtado (born 1999), American actor
- Rodolfo Hurtado (1940–2005), Mexican artist

== See also ==
- Andrés Hurtado de Mendoza, 3rd Marquis of Cañete (circa 1500–1561), Spanish military officer
- Antonio Hurtado de Mendoza (1586–1644), Spanish dramatist
- Diego Evelino Hurtado de Compostela (1638–1704), Bishop of Diocese of Santiago de Cuba
- Diego Hurtado de Mendoza (1503–1575), Spanish novelist, poet, diplomat and historian
- García Hurtado de Mendoza, 5th Marquis of Cañete (1535–1609), Spanish soldier
- Furtado
- Hurtado (Panama), a subdivision of La Chorrera District in Panamá Province, Panama
- Jorge Carlos Hurtado Valdez (born 1949), Mexican politician
- Sebastián Hurtado de Corcuera (died 1660), Spanish soldier and colonial official
- Teresa Hurtado de Ory (born 1983), Spanish actress
