= Netley (disambiguation) =

Netley is a village in Hampshire, England.

Netley may also refer to:

- Netley, South Australia, a suburb of Adelaide, South Australia
- HMS Netley, several British Royal Navy ships

== People with the surname ==
- John Netley (1860–1903), English cab driver alleged to be involved with the Whitechapel Murders

== People with the given name ==
- Netley Lucas (c. 1903 – 1940), English confidence trickster and writer

== See also ==
- Netley Heath, an area near Gomshall in Surrey, England
- Netley Marsh, a village and civil parish in Hampshire, England
