= Furtado =

Furtado is a surname of Portuguese origin common in Portugal and Brazil. This last name is also found in Goa, India where the Portuguese colonized in the 15th century. It may refer to:

- Abraham Furtado (1756-1817), French Sephardi Jew
- Aline Furtado (born 1995), Brazilian rugby union player
- Alvaro de Loyola Furtado (1914-1981), Indian medical doctor
- Andy Furtado (born 1980), Costa Rican footballer
- Anna Furtado (born 1947), American lesbian writer
- Antonio Luz Furtado (born 1934), Brazilian computer scientist
- Arlindo Gomes Furtado (born 1949), Cape Verdean bishop
- Avertano Furtado (born 1966), Indian politician
- C. L. Furtado, Indian Christian theologian
- Caetano Xavier Furtado (1897–1980), Goan born botanist whose standard author abbreviation is Furtado
- Catarina Furtado (born 1972), Portuguese television presenter
- Cécile Furtado-Heine (1821-1896), French philanthropist
- Celso Furtado (1920–2004), influential Brazilian economist
- Damien Furtado (born 1997), French-Angolan footballer
- Dário Furtado (born 1979), Cape Verdean footballer
- Dolores Furtado (born 1938), American politician
- Farrel Furtado (born 1961), Indian politician
- Flávio Furtado (born 1978), Cape Verdean boxer
- Francisco Furtado (1917-??), Brazilian rower
- Francisco José Furtado (1818-1870), Brazilian politician
- Francisco Xavier de Mendonça Furtado (1701-1769), Portuguese soldier and Secretary of State, Governor of Brazil
- Franklim Furtado (born 1987), Bissau-Guinean basketball player
- Frederick Furtado (born 1956), Tanzanian field hockey player
- Gabriel Furtado (born 1999), Brazilian footballer
- Gustavo Furtado (born 2001), Brazilian footballer
- Ivana Maria Furtado (born 1999), Indian chess player
- Joaquim Furtado (born 1948), Portuguese journalist
- Jorge Furtado (born 1959), Brazilian film writer and director
- José Emilio Furtado (born 1983), Cape Verdean footballer
- Joseph Furtado (1872-1947), Indian poet
- Juli Furtado (born 1967), US mountain biker
- Júnia Ferreira Furtado (born 1960), Brazilian historian
- Mario de Loyola Furtado (1913-1946), Indian journalist
- Nelly Furtado (born 1978), Canadian singer-songwriter
- Nicolás Furtado (born 1988), Uruguayan actor
- Pablo Furtado (born 2004), Uruguayan footballer
- Rafael Furtado (born 1999), Brazilian footballer
- S. R. Furtado (1912-1995), Indian religious leader
- Steve Furtado (born 1994), French-African footballer
- Teresa Furtado (1845-1877), English actress
- Tony Furtado (born 1967), US Folk/Americana banjoist, slide guitarist singer/songwriter
- Willis Furtado (born 1997), French-African footballer

== See also ==
- Hurtado
