= Marianne Lederer =

French translation scholar (1934–2026)

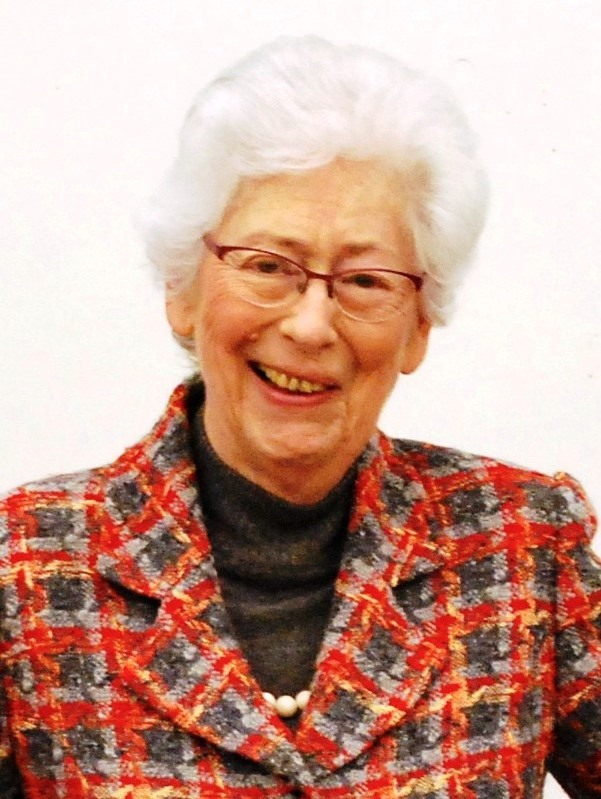
Marianne Lederer

Marianne Lederer (1934 – 10 April 2026) was a French translation scholar. Lederer further developed the Interpretive Theory of Translation together with Danica Seleskovitch, who first proposed the theory. Lederer also published several works on translation and interpreting pedagogy. Her works have greatly influenced interpreting and translation research and teaching internationally.

== Background ==
Marianne Lederer was born in Paris in 1934. Her father, Edgar Lederer, was an internationally renowned bio-chemist of Austrian-Jewish descent and her mother, Hélène Fréchet, was French. She was the eldest of four sisters and three brothers. Before the Second World War, the family lived in Vienna in Austria, and in Leningrad in the Soviet Union, where her father had a position at the Vitamin institute. The family returned to Paris, but was forced to flee during the 1940 exodus and refugee crisis. After studying literature at the Sorbonne and after several language stays in the United Kingdom and the United States, Lederer obtained her diploma as a French-English-German conference interpreter from the School of Translators and Interpreters, which was then located at the HEC Paris. She was also a member of AIIC.

As a fresh interpreter graduate in 1958, she got the opportunity to interpret for a three-month-long American mission to Tunisia with the OCEC (the predecessor to OECD), the other interpreter for the mission was Danica Seleskovitch. According to the biography of Danica Seleskovitch, this mission marked the start of their collaboration both as interpreters and researchers as well as their life-long friendship. During the development of the Interpretive Theory of Translation, Lederer was the sounding board and discussant of Seleskovitch. When developing the theory, Lederer focused on simultaneous interpretation and Seleskovitch on consecutive interpretation.

Lederer died on 10 April 2026, at the age of 91.

== University career ==
In 1978, Lederer obtained a doctorate from the University of Paris 4-Sorbonne on Simultaneous translation: Theoretical foundations (La traduction simultanée - Experience et Théorie). She was appointed professor at the University of Paris XII-Val de Marne in 1979, where she founded the department of foreign languages and headed that same department until 1985. In 1985, she took up a position at the Ecole Supérieure d'Interprètes et de Traducteurs (ESIT) at the University of Paris 3, where she had been teaching since 1969. She was the head of ESIT from 1990 to 1999. Until her retirement in September 2002, she directed the Centre for Research and Translatology at the Université Paris 3 - Sorbonne Nouvelle.

== Research ==
The launch of the Interpretive Theory of Translation, in the 1970s promoted translation as a triangular process rather than a linear coding. The theory has heavily influenced translation and interpretation pedagogy throughout the world. Marianne Lederer's work on the Interpretive Theory has been widely used in teaching of interpreting, and her works have been translated into English, Chinese, Georgian, Arabic, Serbian, Korean, Hungarian, Dutch, Spanish and Persian.

Together with Danica Seleskovitch, she was one of the first translators to break away from the structural linguistics, which still dominated in the 1970s. This was done by placing the translator at the centre of the process, and to turn to other disciplines, such as psychology and neuropsychology, to explain the cognitive process of interpreting and translation. She was also one of the founders and promotors of the so called Paris-school of interpreting which promotes interpreting into a mother tongue or L1.

Lederer was co-editor of Forum, an international journal of interpretation and translation, published by John Benjamins Publishing Company, member of the International Association of Conference Interpreters (AIIC), and the European Society of Translation Studies (EST). In 2002, she received The Danica Seleskovitch Prize for prominent work for interpreters and research into interpreting.

Lederer retired in 2002, but has continued to publish and research as an active researcher and was affiliated with the CLESTHIA research group at the Sorbonne Nouvelle University. In November 2011, she was awarded the Joseph Zaarour medal at the Saint Joseph University of Beirut for her contributions to Translation and Interpreting Studies.

== Main publications ==
- 1978: Simultaneous Interpretation — Units of Meaning and other Features. In: Gerver D., Sinaiko H.W. (eds) Language Interpretation and Communication. NATO Conference Series, vol 6. Boston, MA: Springer. doi:10.1007/978-1-4615-9077-4_28
- 1981: La traduction simultanée - Experience et Théorie, [Simultaneous translation: Experience and Theory]. Paris: Minard Lettres Modernes. ISBN 2-256-90799-6
- 1984: Interpréter pour traduire, [Interpreting to translate] with D. Seleskovitch, Paris: Didier Erudition. 5th edition by Les Belles Lettres in 2014 ISBN 9782251700045
- 1990: The role of cognitive complements in interpreting. In Bowen, D. and Bowen, M.(eds) Interpreting–Yesterday. Today, and Tomorrow. Binghamton: American Translators Association Scholarly Monograph Series, 4, 53-60. doi:10.1075/ata.iv.11led
- 1995: A Systematic Approach to Teaching Interpretation, with D. Seleskovitch, (translated by Jacolyn Harmer). Washington: RID. ISBN 9780916883133
- 2003: Translation – The Interpretive Model, (translated by Ninon Larché). London: Routledge. ISBN 9781900650618
- 2007: Can Theory Help Translator and Interpreter Trainers and Trainees? The Interpreter and Translator Trainer 1 (1), 15-35. doi:10.1080/1750399X.2007.10798748
