= Forum (journal) =

- Discipline: Translation studies
- Language: English, French
- Edited by: Marianne Lederer, Choi Jungwha

Publication details
- History: 2003-present
- Publisher: John Benjamins
- Frequency: Biannually
- Open access: Hybrid

Standard abbreviations
- ISO 4: Forum

Indexing
- ISSN: 1598-7647 (print); 2451-909X (web)
- OCLC no.: 184752150

Links
- Journal homepage; Online access; Online archive

Forum: International Journal of Interpretation and Translation is a biannual peer-reviewed academic journal covering translation studies. It was established in 2003 by Marianne Lederer and Choi Jungwha and is published by John Benjamins.

== Abstracting and indexing ==
The journal is abstracted and indexed in:

- Emerging Sources Citation Index
- ERIH PLUS
- Linguistic Bibliography/Bibliographie Linguistique
- MLA International Bibliography
- Scopus
