= Rose Celli =

French writer (1895–1982)

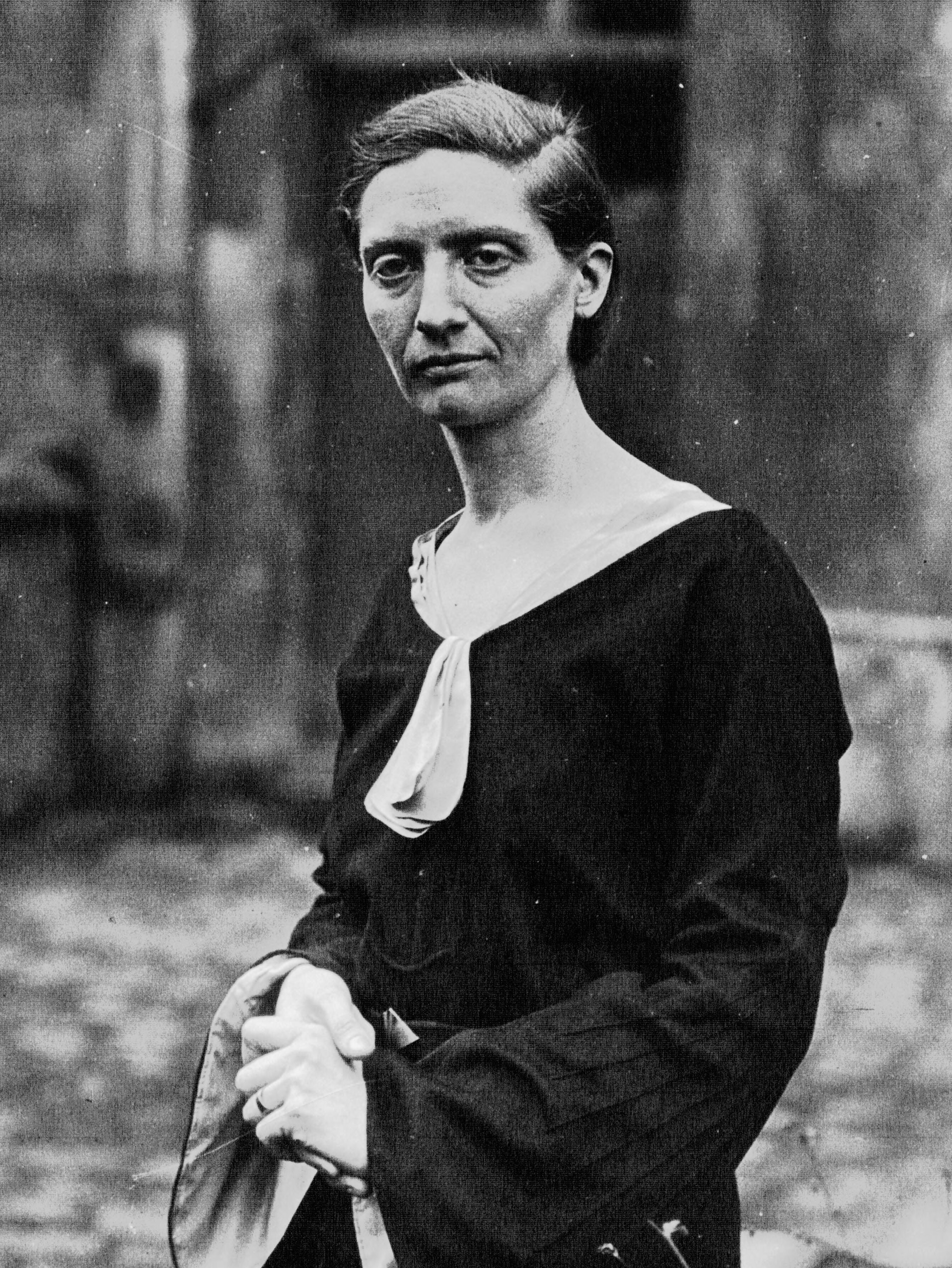
- Celli, 1933
- Born: Rose Angéline Alexandrine Brua; March 1895; Philippeville, Algeria
- Died: 1982 (aged 86–87); Saint Paul de Vence, France
- Occupations: Novelist; playwright; translator; poet
- Spouse: Elmiro Celli
- Writing career
- Genres: Fiction; children's literature

Rose Angéline Alexandrine Celli (née Brua; March 1895 – 1982) was a French novelist, playwright, translator and poet. She wrote children's books, poetry and novels for adults, and is best known for her children's books published as part of the Père Castor series.

== Early life and education ==
Celli was born in Philippeville, Algeria, in March 1895. Her father was of Alsatian heritage and her mother was Corsican. She spent four years at secondary school in Philippeville, after which she moved to France and attended a preparatory course at a high school in Versailles.

She subsequently entered the École normale supérieure de jeunes filles, intending to become a teacher. She was a classmate of Suzanne Febvre, the wife of Lucien Febvre. Celli did not graduate, however, due to a disagreement with the school's administration. She was later paid to undertake copy-editing of Lucien Febvre's Encyclopédie française. Around the time of leaving the École she married the painter Elmiro Celli (1870–1958).

== Literary career ==
In 1929, Celli received the Prix de la Liberté literary award for her fantasy story Le Bateau de Pierre. She had entered this competition on the encouragement of a fellow student at the École. Her first novel, Comme l'eau, was published by Editions du Tambourin in 1930, and it was followed by the collection of short stories published by Flammarion in 1931, Le chale indien. A copy of the latter is held in the Princeton University Rare Books Collection, and is hand-dedicated to Sylvia Beach. She also wrote poetry; some of her poems were published in the magazine Europe.

In 1932, she was one of the first authors to contribute to the Père Castor children's book series, published by Flammarion. Her works for this series included animal stories, a version of Goldilocks and the Three Bears, and a story about Baba Yaga, illustrated by Nathalie Parain. Baba Yaga was translated into English and published in the United States in 1935.

Also in 1932, Celli's first play, L'enfant Voilé premiered at the Albert Theatre in Paris, in three acts. It was performed by the theatre group L'Exposition d'Art Dramatique A review in La Liberté newspaper described it as similar in style to the work of Henrik Ibsen.

In 1933, Celli received the Prix Minerva award for her novel Isola, a historical work set in the Corsican mountains. The award came with a prize of 5,000 francs. Her 1935 book L'envers du tapis featured stories of her childhood growing up in Algeria. In later years, Celli translated a number of English works into French under the name R Brua, including a translation of Not So Quiet by Evadne Price (written as Helen Zenna Smith) and The Fun of It by Amelia Earhart.

== Death ==
Celli died in 1982 in Saint Paul de Vence.
