= Ken Attiwill =

Australian writer (1906–1992)

Ken Attiwill MC
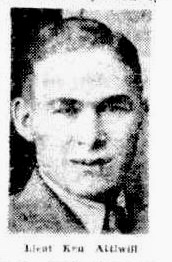
- Attiwill, 1945
- Born: 21 September 1906; Adelaide, Australia
- Died: 4 August 1992 (aged 85); Sydney, Australia
- Occupations: Journalist; author; playwright; scriptwriter
- Spouse: Evadne Price
- Children: None
- Writing career
- Years active: 1927–1976
- Notable work: Horizon (1930)

Kenneth Andrew Attiwill MC (23 September 1906 – 4 August 1992) was an Australian journalist, writer, playwright and scriptwriter.

== Life and career ==
Attiwill was born at Nailsworth, Adelaide, in South Australia, in 1906, the youngest of four children. His parents were Alfred Charles Attiwill, a post-office employee, and his wife Edna Marie, née Clark. Her father, E. J. Clark, had been a newspaper editor with the Adelaide Register. Mrs Clark, Attiwill's maternal grandmother, encouraged her grandsons to become writers.

He began work in Adelaide as a cadet journalist with the Register. In 1927 he moved to Melbourne, where he was employed by the Sun and the Herald. His brother, Keith Gordon Attiwill (1899–1975) was also a journalist in Melbourne, where he became Chief of Staff at the Argus.

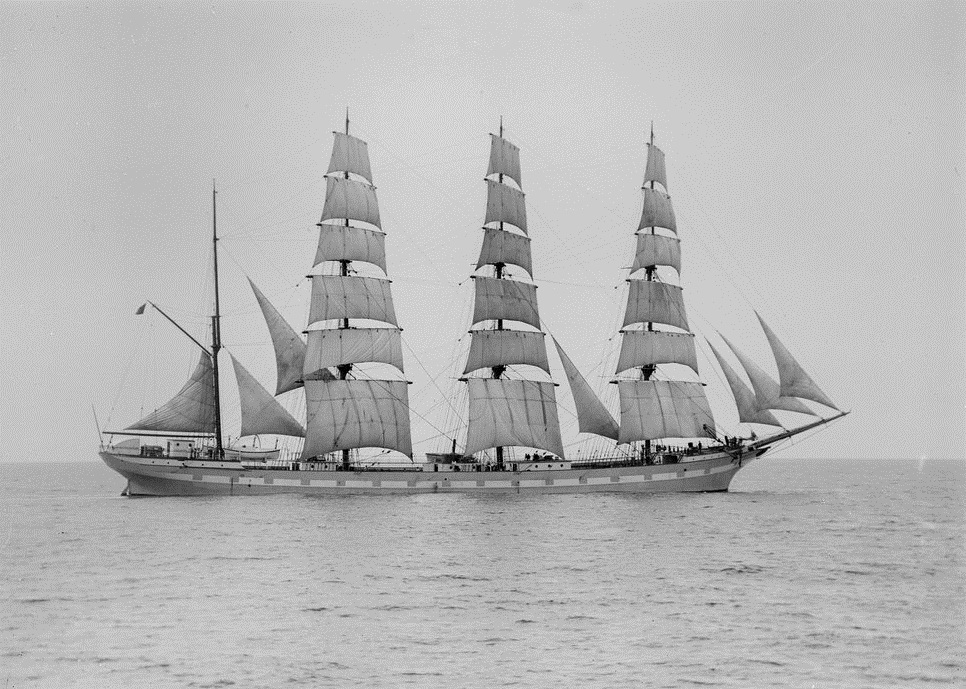
The four-masted barque Archibald Russell was built at Greenock in 1905.

Attiwill left for Europe as a crewman in the Finnish sailing ship Archibald Russell in 1929. The voyage provided him with the material for his first book, Horizon (1930).

In Britain he worked for the Daily Sketch in London. Another Australian journalist working on the newspaper was Evadne Price (1888–1985), whom he married in 1939. They later became freelance writers and together co-authored a number of books and plays. They also co-wrote scripts for the British television soap opera Crossroads in the 1960s.

In World War II he served as an artillery officer in the British Army. He was a lieutenant with the 6th HAA Regiment when he captured by the Japanese in Java in 1942 and became a prisoner of war. He was presumed dead for 16 months. He and other prisoners were held at a camp at Tanjung Priok for nine months. They were then shipped to Japan on a voyage in which one in three prisoners died. On arrival he and others were put to work in a coal mine at Ube. He was liberated by Allied forces in September 1945. In 1946 he was awarded the Military Cross for gallant and distinguished services in Java.

Four of his novels and plays were made into films: Non stop New York (1937), Once a Crook (1941) Headline (1943) and Not Wanted on Voyage (1957). He and his wife also appeared as actors in the film Trouble with Junia (1967).

Attiwill and his wife returned to Australia in 1976. He died in Sydney on 4 August 1992, aged 85. He is buried in the Northern Suburbs Memorial Park and Crematorium, Sydney.

== Select bibliography ==
- Horizon (1930)
- Steward (1932)
- Reporter! (1933)
- Two Minutes (1934)
- Big Ben (1936)
- Sky Steward (1936)
- Once a Crook; A play in a prologue and three acts (1943)
- The Rising Sunset (1957)
- The Singapore Story (1959)

== Oral History ==
Attiwill was interviewed in 1977 by Hazel de Berg. The recording can be found at the National Library of Australia.

== Sources ==
- H.M. Green (1985, revised and edited by Dorothy Green), History of Australian literature, Sydney, Angus & Robertson, p. 1403. ISBN 0-207-14255-6
- E. Morris Miller & Frederick T. Macartney, Australian Literature, Angus and Robertson, Sydney, 1956, p. 43.
- William H. Wilde, Oxford companion to Australian literature, OUP, Melbourne, 1986, p. 43.
- “Ken Attiwill,” Austlit.edu.au
