= Choi Jungwha =

South Korean translator (1955–2026)

- Born: October 16, 1955; Seoul, South Korea
- Died: June 14, 2026 (aged 70)
- Education: Kyunggi All-Girls' High School; Hankuk University of Foreign Studies (BA – French); Sorbonne Nouvelle University (PhD – Translation and Interpreting Studies); Sorbonne Nouvelle University (MA – Translation and Interpreting Studies)
- Occupations: President of CICI, Digital Creator
- Spouse: Didier Beltoise

Korean name
- Hangul: 최정화
- Hanja: 崔楨禾
- RR: Choe Jeonghwa
- MR: Ch'oe Chŏnghwa

Choi Jungwha (Korean: 최정화; October 16, 1955 – June 14, 2026) was a South Korean digital creator who served as the President of the Corea Image Communication Institute (CICI). She was known for being the translator of many important figures including for former president Chun Doo-hwan of the Fifth Republic of Korea, and former presidents Roh Tae-woo, Kim Young-sam, Kim Dae-jung, and Roh Moo-hyun of the Sixth Republic of Korea. She was also known for having translated over 2000 times at international conventions.

== Life and career ==
Choi Jungwha began her career as a professor of Translation and Interpreting Studies at the Hankuk University of Foreign Studies in 1988. In 2003, she founded the Corea Image Communication Institute, a non-profit organization meant to promote South Korea's image. In 2021, she formally retired as a professor but was given the title of a professor emeritus. In 2015, she became the Secretary General for the Korea-France club. Since 1986, Choi Jungwha has also written at least 33 books on the topic of language learning and interpretation. In 2020, she started running a YouTube channel called Choi JW Rendez-vous.

Choi died on June 14, 2026, at the age of 70.

== Awards ==
- Recipient of the 1992 Ordre des Palmes académiques
- Prizewinner of the 2000 Danica Seleskovitch Prize
- Recipient of the 2003 Légion d'honneur
