= Not Wanted on Voyage =

1957 British film by Maclean Rogers

- Original British theatrical poster
- Directed by: Maclean Rogers
- Written by: Michael Pertwee; Evadne Price (additional situations & dialogue); Dudley Turrock (From an original work by); Jack Marks (uncredited); Roland Pertwee (uncredited)
- Based on: the play Wanted on Voyage by Evadne Price and Ken Attiwill
- Produced by: Henry Halstead; Jack Marks; George Minter
- Starring: Ronald Shiner; Brian Rix; Griffith Jones; Catherine Boyle
- Cinematography: Arthur Grant
- Edited by: Helen Wiggins
- Music by: Tony Lowry; Tony Fones
- Production companies: Byron Films (In association with) Ronald Shiner Productions
- Distributed by: Renown Pictures (UK)
- Release date: November 1957 (UK)
- Running time: 87 minutes
- Country: United Kingdom
- Language: English

Not Wanted on Voyage is a 1957 British comedy film directed by Maclean Rogers and starring Ronald Shiner, Brian Rix and Catherine Boyle. It was written by Michael Pertwee, Evadne Price and Dudley Turrock based on the 1949 play Wanted on Voyage by Ken Attiwill and his wife Evadne Price, and was made at British National Studios.

== Plot ==
Two cabin stewards working on a luxury vessel on a Mediterranean cruise to Tangier attempt to earn extra money from the passengers using every possible means. However, when one of the wealthy dowagers has her valuable diamond necklace stolen, they do everything they can to ensure it is restored to her.

== Cast ==
- Ronald Shiner as Steward Albert Higgins
- Brian Rix as Steward Cecil Hollebone
- Griffith Jones as Guy Harding
- Catherine Boyle (Katie Boyle) as Julie Hains
- Fabia Drake as Mrs. Brough
- Michael Brennan as Chief Steward
- Michael Shepley as Col. Blewton-Fawcett
- Dorinda Stevens as Pat
- Martin Boddey as Captain
- Janet Barrow as Lady Maud Catesby
- Therese Burton as Mrs. Rose
- John Chapman as Mr. Rose
- Peter Prowse as Strang
- Eric Pohlmann as Pedro
- Larry Noble as Steward Bleeding
- Michael Ripper as Steward Macy
- Hugh Moxey as 1st Officer

== Box office ==
Kinematograph Weekly declared the film "proved popular" at the box office.

== Critical reception ==
The Monthly Film Bulletin wrote: "An alarming proportion of the gags and farcical situations misfire, so that the film is mostly rather tepid Whitehall farce. Therese Burton's lisping newly-wed has a quaintness and mild charm that singles it out from the rest."

In The Radio Times Guide to Films David Parkinson gave the film 1/5 stars, writing: "A story about a luxury liner and a stolen necklace – sounds familiar? The script of Titanic might not be poetry, but it's a darn sight better than the drivel that passes for dialogue in this dismal comedy. Co-screenwriter Michael Pertwee enjoyed considerable success both before and after making a contribution to this venture, which is so unfunny that even gallant troupers Ronald Shiner and Brian Rix cannot conceal their dismay."

TV Guide wrote, "Too much corn stops this comedy from popping."

Allmovie wrote, "Even those filmgoers who'd seen and heard the wheezy gags in Not Wanted on Voyage in earlier films were amused by the breezy ridiculousness of the project."

British film critic Leslie Halliwell said: "Feeble fun from an old play."
