= Tirukkural translations into French =

French has the second maximum number of translations of the Tirukkural among European languages, next only to English. As of 2015, there were at least 18 translations of the Kural text available in French.

== History of translations ==
The first translation of the Kural text into French was made by an unknown author, which was titled Kural de Tiruvalluvar and found a place in the Bibliothèque nationale de France of France in 1767. However, it is E. S. Ariel who is generally credited with bringing the Kural text to the French world. Ariel, who considered the Kural as one of the highest and purest expressions of human thought, translated fragments of the first two divisions of the work, viz. aram (virtue) and porul (wealth) in 1848. Since then several translations appeared in French, chief among which are those by Pierre-Eugène Lamairesse (1867), G. Fontaineu de Barrigue (1889), Dumast, Louis Jacolliot, and Alain Daniélou (1942). Gnanou Diagou translated the entire work in 1942, which was first published in Pondicherry. Few other translations were published in the 20th century, including M. Sangeelee (1988) and François Gros (1992). In 2007, Rama Valayden published a translation in Port-Louis, Mauritius.

== Translations ==
Translation	Chapitre 26, Abstinence de chair	
Translation	Kural 254 (Couplet 26:4)	Kural 258 (Couplet 26:8)
Gnanou Diagou, 1942	Qu’est ce que la miséricorde? C’est ne pas vers tuer. Qu’est ce qui n’est pas miséricorde? C’est tuer. Donc, manger la chair qui provient du meurtre n’est pas vertueux.	Les sages qui se sont délivrés de l’Illusion et de l’Ignorance ne mangent pas la viande, d’où s’est échappée la vie d’un être.

== See also ==
- Tirukkural translations
- List of Tirukkural translations by language
