= Edgar Lederer =

Edgar Lederer (born 5 June 1908 in Vienna, Austria-Hungary; died 19 October 1988 in Sceaux, Hauts-de-Seine, France) was an Austrian-born French biochemist, known for his research on many natural products, and his role in the development of chromatography.

== Biography ==
Lederer studied chemistry in Vienna, graduating with a doctorate in 1930 for a thesis on indole alkaloids. He then went to Heidelberg University to work in the laboratory of Richard Kuhn, a specialist in complex natural substances.

In 1931, Lederer and Kuhn improved adsorption chromatography, permitting the separation of individual components through column chromatography. Chromatography had been developed previously in 1906 by Russian botanist Mikhail Tsvet (who published a book about it in 1910), and then by Leroy Sheldon Palmer (whose book would be studied by Lederer in 1922), Charles Dhéré, and others, but the technique didn't receive much attention until 1931. After Kuhn and Lederer's substantial contribution, chromatography would become an essential tool, especially in biochemistry. They improved paper chromatography so that it could be used with hydrophilic and colorless substances. Using chromatography, Lederer succeeded in isolating many natural substances such as carotenoids like astaxanthin from shells of lobsters, vitamin A_{2}, lipids and peptides of microbes, and pheromones of bees. He also studied the chemistry of perfumes, the manner in which people synthesize a number of natural products. Another area of research for him was microbiology: Lederer identified various proteins in bacterial cell walls that play an important role in the immune system, and studied the pathogen that causes tuberculosis.

While Lederer was in Heidelberg, he met the French woman Hélène Fréchet (1909–2001). They married in 1932, and would have seven children together: four daughters, the eldest of whom is Marianne Lederer, and three sons. In 1933, because as a Jew he had no future in Germany due to the Nazis, he escaped to Paris, then spent some time in Leningrad, then returned to Paris. In 1938, he became a French citizen. At the start of WWII, he refused the exile proposed by Louis Rapkine and the Rockefeller Foundation. During the war, he stayed in Lyon and worked in the laboratory of Claude Fromageot (1899–1958), professor of biochemistry.

Afterwards, in 1947, he returned to Paris, where he became Maitre de Recherche [principal investigator] and then recteur de Recherche [research director] at CNRS. In 1958, he became professor of biochemistry at the Sorbonne. In 1963, he founded and directed a biochemistry institute in Orsay, where he remained until his retirement in 1978. Meanwhile, starting in 1960, he directed the Institut de Chimie des Substances Naturelles (ICSN) in Gif-sur-Yvette, near Paris.

Edgar Lederer died in October 1988, upon return from a conference tour in Russia.

== Recognition ==
Lederer received the 1951 Ernest Guenther Award, the 1964 Paul Karrer Gold Medal and Lecture, the 1964 August Wilhelm von Hofmann Medal, the 1974 CNRS Gold Medal, the 1976 M. S. Tswett chromatography medal (alongside V. Pretorius, A. T. James, G. Guiochon, and M. J. E. Golay), and a 1982 Robert Koch Gold Medal.

He was elected as a member of the French Academy of Sciences in 1982, and was a member of 8 foreign academies, including the Austrian Academy of Sciences. He joined the German National Academy of Sciences Leopoldina in 1961.

In 2018, a building on the la Doua campus of Claude Bernard University Lyon 1 was named after him.

== Works ==
Note: this list consists of a few selected publications; it not at all comprehensive.

- Lederer, Edgar (2007). Itinéraire d'un biochimiste français. Publibook. ISBN 978-2-7483-3912-3.
- Kuhn, Richard; Winterstein, Alfred; Lederer, Edgar (1931) [Vorgetragen von A. Winterstein in der Züricher Chemischen Gesellschaft am 27. Januar 1931. Der Redaktion zugegangen am 10. März 1931.]. "Zur Kenntnis der Xanthophylle". Hoppe-Seyler's Zeitschrift für Physiologische Chemie. 197 (1–4): 141–160. doi:10.1515/bchm2.1931.197.1-4.141. ISSN 0018-4888.
- Kuhn, Richard; Lederer, Edgar (June 1931) [Eingegangen am 18. März 1931.]. "Zerlegung des Carotins in seine Komponenten. (Über das Vitamin des Wachstums, I. Mitteil.)". Berichte der Deutschen Chemischen Gesellschaft. Band II, Abteilung B. 64 (6) 212: 1349–1357. doi:10.1002/cber.19310640624. eISSN 1099-0682. ISSN 0365-9488.

== Sources ==
- Picard, Jean-François; Pradoura, Elisabeth (19 March 1986). "Entretien avec Edgar Lederer". HISTCNRS. Archived from the original on July 24, 2023.
- "Edgar Lederer: Biochimiste; Médaille d'or du CNRS 1974" (in French). CNRS.
- Dosso, Diane (October–December 2000). "Les scientifiques français réfugiés en Amérique et la France Libre". Matériaux pour l'histoire de notre temps (in French). No. 60 "Les Etats-Unis et les réfugiés politiques européens : des années 1930 aux années 1950". pp. 34–40. doi:10.3406/mat.2000.403238. ISSN 0769-3206.
- Ettre, L. S. (June 1983). "Professor Edgar Lederer 75 Years Old". Editorial. Chromatographia. 17 (6): 299. doi:10.1007/BF02270660. eISSN 1612-1112. ISSN 0009-5893. Internet Archive sim_chromatographia_1983-06_17_6.
- Gehrke, Charles W.; Wixom, Robert L.; Bayer, Ernst, eds. (2001). Chromatography: a century of discovery 1900–2000: the bridge to the sciences/technology. Journal of Chromatography library, vol. 64. Elsevier. ISBN 978-0-444-50114-1. LCCN 2001053230. OL 8132723W. Google Books CiUyvgAACAAJ. Internet Archive chromatographyce0064unse.
- Institut für Zeitgeschichte (1983). "Lederer, Edgar". International Biographical Dictionary of Central European Emigrés 1933–1945. Vol. II / Part 1. München: K.G. Saur Verlag KG. p. 699. doi:10.1515/9783110970272.681. ISBN 978-3-598-10089-5.
- Laszlo, Pierre (2008). "Lederer, Edgar". Complete Dictionary of Scientific Biography. Vol. 22. Michigan: Charles Scribner's Sons. pp. 226–230. ISBN 978-0-684-80588-7. Academia.edu 6496303. Gale CX2830905849.
- Zlatkis, A. (November 1976). "The M. S. Tswett Chromatography Medal". Chromatographia. 9 (11): 537–539. doi:10.1007/BF02275959. eISSN 1612-1112. ISSN 0009-5893. Internet Archive sim_chromatographia_1976_9.
