= Once a Crook (film) =

- Directed by: Herbert Mason
- Written by: Roger Burford
- Produced by: Edward Black
- Starring: Gordon Harker; Sydney Howard; Bernard Lee; Kathleen Harrison; Raymond Huntley
- Cinematography: Arthur Crabtree
- Edited by: R. E. Dearing
- Production company: 20th Century Fox
- Distributed by: 20th Century-Fox
- Release date: 23 August 1941 (United Kingdom)
- Running time: 78 minutes
- Country: United Kingdom
- Language: English

Once a Crook is a 1941 British crime film directed by Herbert Mason, produced by Edward Black for 20th Century Fox and featuring Gordon Harker, Sydney Howard, Bernard Lee, Kathleen Harrison, and Raymond Huntley. It was written by Roger Burford based on the 1939 stage play of the same title by Evadne Price and Ken Attiwell.

== Plot summary ==
Charlie Hopkins is a retired burglar with an expertise in safecracking. His ex-partner The Duke holds a grudge against Charlie, since he believes he ratted him out and sent him to jail. The Duke is out for revenge against Charlie, and hires Bill Hopkins, Charlie's son, to help him perform a hit, with an intention to frame the kid. The Duke's plan doesn't work out, since Bill turns out to be an even better safecracker than his old man. After many complications along the road, the hit is a success, and The Duke is bereaved of his revenge, ultimately stopped by his good-hearted sweetheart, Estelle.

== Cast ==
- Gordon Harker as Charlie Hopkins
- Sydney Howard as Hallelujah Harry
- Kathleen Harrison as Auntie
- Carla Lehmann as Estelle
- Bernard Lee as The Duke
- Cyril Cusack as Bill Hopkins
- Diana King as Bessie
- Joss Ambler as Inspector Marsh
- Charles Lamb as Joseph
- Raymond Huntley as Prison Governor
- Felix Aylmer as King's Counsel
- John Salew as solicitor
- Wally Patch as warder
- Frank Pettingell as The Captain

== Reception ==
The Monthly Film Bulletin wrote: "This is a slick, fast-moving film with a well-defined plot in which great care has been paid to detail so that the background is authentic. Gordon Harker is himself, as always, and Sydney Howard as "Hallelujah" Harry, potman, ex-pickpocket and psalm-singing rogue, through his own mannerisms acts successfully as Gordon Harker's foil. A very nice if straightforward performance is given by Diana King, barmaid, fiancée of Hopkins' boy and one of the family. Bernard Lee makes "The Duke" a suave villain, but Joss Ambler is a little too blunt and stiff for a CID inspector. Nevertheless, the cast as a whole plays well individually and collectively."

Kine Weekly wrote: "The first half is a little on the slow side – we take a little while to sort out the romantic and domestic by-plots – but from the moment Charlie is made a double scapegoat for the Duke's villainy things really begin to hum. At all times there is a generous meed [sic] of crisp humour and an insistence upon good atmosphere. Well-planned laughs and thrills provide in the end the framework and facade of capital British comedy crime entertainment."

In British Sound Films: The Studio Years 1928–1959 David Quinlan rated the film as "good", writing: "Crime drama with lots of character."

== Bibliography ==
- Quinlan, David. (1984). British Sound Films: The Studio Years 1928–1959. BT Batsford Ltd
