= Peter Saunders (impresario) =

English theatre impresario (1911–2003)

Sir Peter Saunders
- Born: 23 November 1911; Swiss Cottage, London, England
- Died: 6 February 2003 (aged 91); Hampstead, London, England
- Occupation: Theatrical producer
- Known for: Producing and promoting The Mousetrap (1952–1994)
- Spouse(s): Ann Stewart (–1976); Katie Boyle (1979–2003)
- Relatives: Charles Saunders (brother)

Sir Peter Saunders (23 November 1911 – 6 February 2003) was an English theatre impresario, notable for his production of the long-running Agatha Christie murder mystery, The Mousetrap.

== Early life and career ==
Saunders was born in Swiss Cottage, London. His father died in a swimming accident (with the boy on his back), and he was subsequently educated at Oundle School and in Lausanne, Switzerland, thanks to an aunt's sponsorship. Although his mother advised him to get a job with Harrods after completing his education, he instead followed his older brother, the film director Charles Saunders, into showbusiness, working at a film studio as a cameraman and director. Following spells as a newspaper reporter and press agent (to Harry Roy, among others), he served in the Second World War as an Army captain in the Intelligence Corps, and following the end of hostilities, he moved into theatre production.

Saunders purchased the Vaudeville Theatre in 1969. Prior to his most famous adaptation of a book, by the same author, he saw the value of Agatha Christie's writing as suitable for theatre during his UK tours with Murder at the Vicarage and Black Coffee, and his staging of The Hollow, which ran in the West End of London for almost a year. In 1968, he took out a long lease on London's St Martin's Theatre, in West Street near Charing Cross Road.

=== The Mousetrap ===
Saunders' most notable production was The Mousetrap, adapted for the stage by Christie, from her short story Three Blind Mice. It began its run at the Ambassadors Theatre in the West End on 25 November 1952, switched once in 1974 to St Martin's Theatre next door, and continues there to this day, making it the longest unbroken sequence of performances in world theatre history. After relinquishing his direct involvement in the production of the play, he spent many years casting for roles annually, and also promoting it at every opportunity. He finally cut his ties with the play upon his retirement in 1994.

== Personal life ==
Until her death in 1976, Saunders was married to Ann Stewart. In 1979, he remarried, this time to TV personality Katie Boyle, who survived him. He had no children. In 1972, he published his autobiography The Mousetrap Man; and, in 1982, he was knighted. In 1992, his life was celebrated during his appearance on the long-running TV series This Is Your Life. He died in Hampstead, London.
