= Mikhail Tsvet =

Russian-Italian botanist (1872–1919)

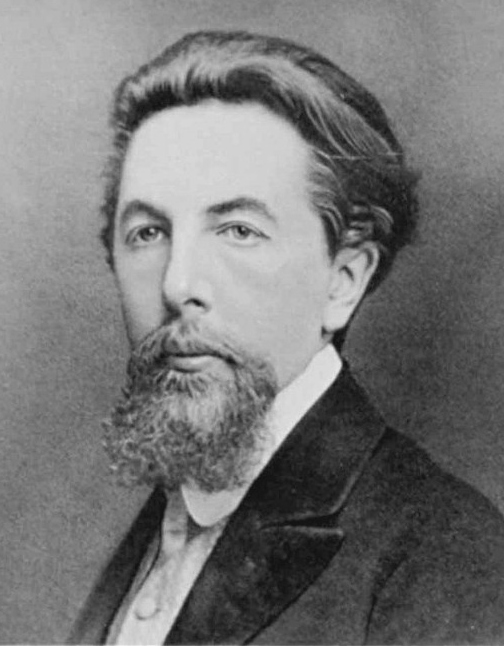
- Mikhail Tsvet
- Born: 14 May 1872; Asti, Italy
- Died: 26 June 1919 (aged 47); Voronezh, Russian SFSR
- Known for: Adsorption chromatography
- Scientific career
- Fields: Botany

Mikhail Semyonovich Tsvet, also spelt Tsvett, Tswett, Tswet, Zwet, and Cvet (Russian: Михаил Семёнович Цвет; 14 May 1872 – 26 June 1919) was a Russian-Italian botanist who invented chromatography. His last name is Russian for "colour" and is also the root word of "flower."

== Biography ==
Mikhail Tsvet was born on 14 May 1872 in Asti, Italy. His mother was Italian, and his father was a Russian official. His mother died soon after his birth, and he was raised in Geneva, Switzerland. He received his BS degree from the Department of Physics and Mathematics at the University of Geneva in 1893. However, he decided to dedicate himself to botany and received his PhD degree in 1896 for his work on cell physiology. He moved to Saint Petersburg, Russia, in 1896 because his father was recalled from the foreign service. There, he started to work at the Biological Laboratory of the Russian Academy of Sciences. His Geneva degrees were not recognized in Russia, and he had to earn Russian degrees. In 1897, he became a teacher of botany courses for women. In 1902, he became a laboratory assistant at the Institute of Plant Physiology of the Warsaw University (now in Poland). In 1903, he became an assistant professor and also taught at other Warsaw universities. After the beginning of World War I, the Warsaw University of Technology was evacuated to Moscow, Russia, and in 1916 again to Gorki near Moscow. In 1917, he became a Professor of Botany and the director of the botanical gardens at the University of Tartu (then Yuryev). In February 1918, before German troops conquered the Estonian city, Tsvet along with most of the Russian academic staff of the university evacuated to Voronezh in Central Russia. Tsvet died of a chronic inflammation of the throat on 26 June 1919 at the age of 47.

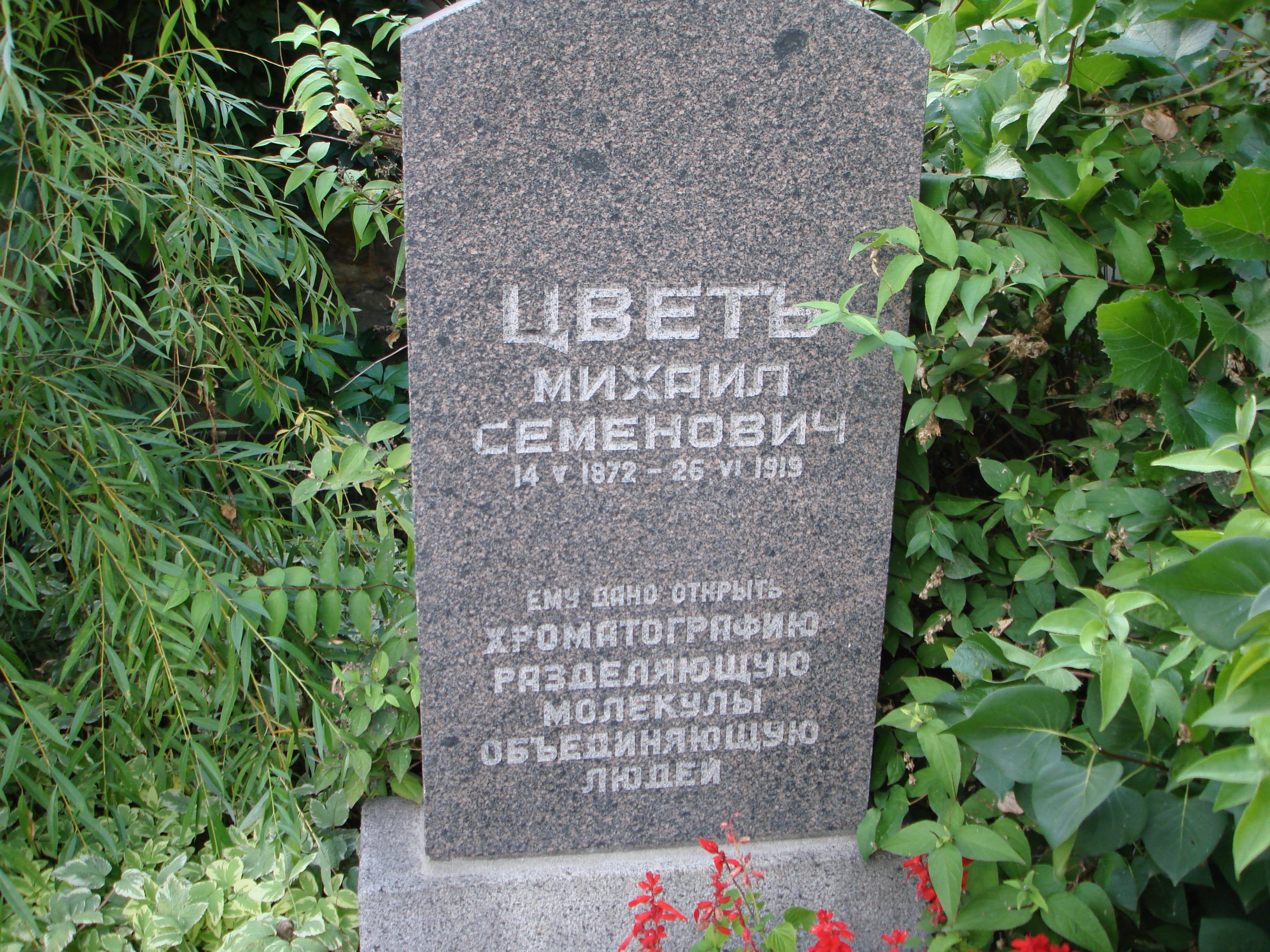
Grave of Tsvet with the inscription: "He invented chromatography, separating molecules but uniting people"

== Chromatography ==
Mikhail Tsvet invented chromatography in 1900 during his research on plant pigments. He used liquid-adsorption column chromatography with calcium carbonate as adsorbent and petrol ether/ethanol mixtures as eluent to separate chlorophylls and carotenoids. The method was described on 30 December 1901 at the XI Congress of Naturalists and Physicians (XI съезд естествоиспытателей и врачей) in St. Petersburg. The first printed description was in 1905, in the Proceedings of the Warsaw Society of Naturalists, biology section. He first used the term "chromatography" in print in 1906 in his two papers about chlorophyll in the German botanical journal, Berichte der Deutschen botanischen Gesellschaft. In 1907, he demonstrated his chromatograph for the German Botanical Society.

For several reasons, Tsvet's work was long ignored: the violent political upheaval in Russia at the beginning of the 20th century, the fact that Tsvet originally published only in Russian (making his results largely inaccessible to western scientists), and an article denying Tsvet's findings. Richard Willstätter and Arthur Stoll tried to repeat Tsvet's experiments, but because they used an overly aggressive adsorbent (destroying the chlorophyll), they were not able to do so. They published their results, and Tsvet's chromatography method fell into obscurity. It was revived 10 years after his death thanks to Austrian biochemist Richard Kuhn and his student, German scientist Edgar Lederer as well as the work of A. J. Martin and R. L. Synge.

== Botanical author abbreviation ==
The standard botanical author abbreviation Tswett is applied to plants that he described.
