= Miriam Shlesinger =

US-Israeli linguist and interpreter

- מרים שלזינגר
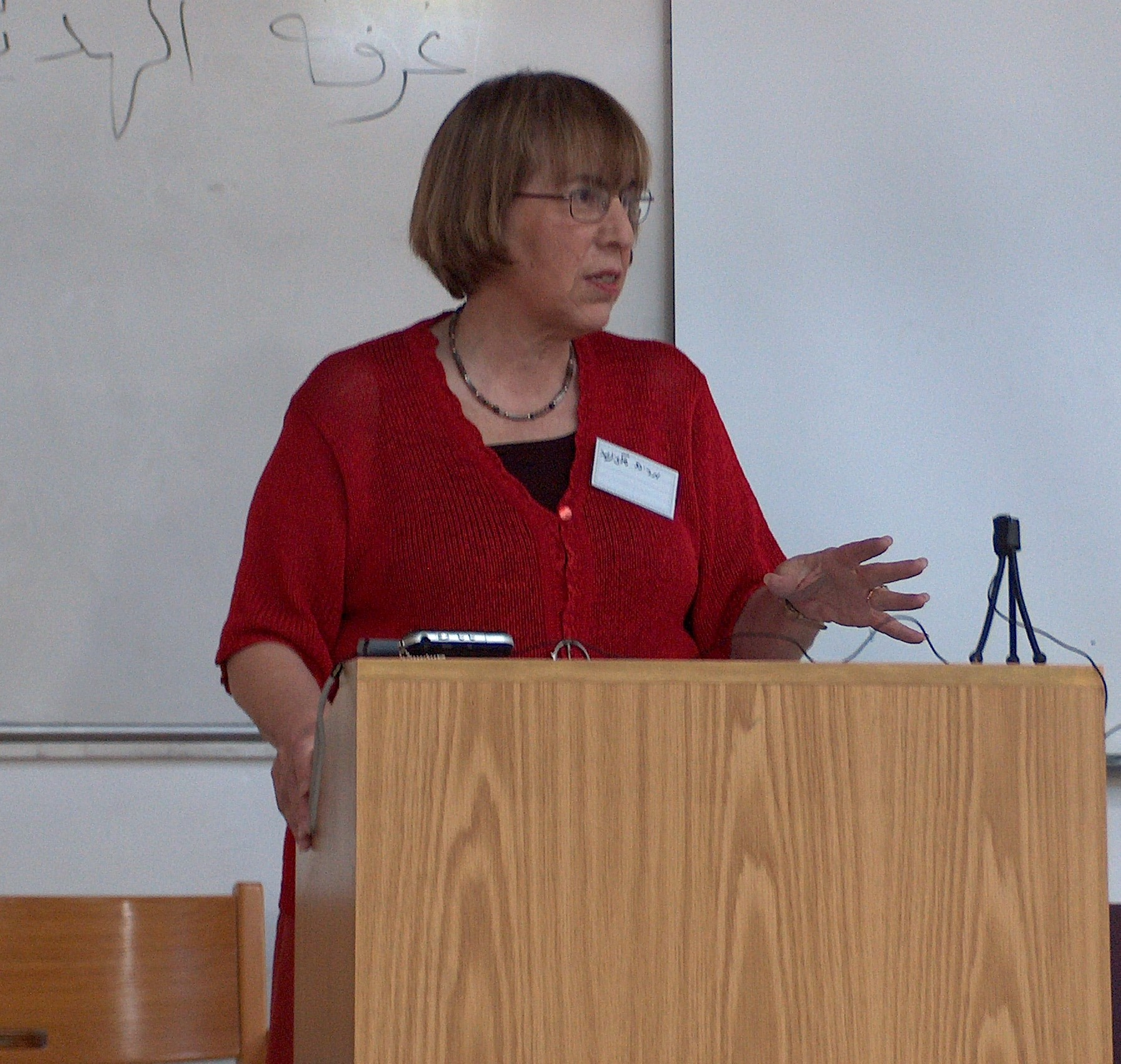
- Born: 20 May 1947; Miami Beach, United States
- Died: 10 November 2012 (aged 65); Kfar Saba, Israel

Academic work
- School or tradition: Descriptive Translation and Interpreting Studies

Miriam Shlesinger (Hebrew: מרים שלזינגר; 20 May 1947, in Miami Beach – 10 November 2012) was a US-Israeli linguist and interpreter.

== Biography ==
Miriam Shlesinger was born in 1947 in Florida. In 1964 she moved to Israel in order to study. She completed her BA at the Hebrew University of Jerusalem in Musicology and English Linguistics. At the beginning of the 1970s Shlesinger took up Translation Studies at the Bar-Ilan University in Ramat Gan. From 1978 she taught at the Institute for Translation Studies at the same university. She completed her MA in Poetics and Literary Studies in 1990 at the Tel Aviv University with a thesis on "Simultaneous interpretation as a factor in effecting shifts in the position of texts in the oral-literate continuum". She completed her PhD at Bar-Ilan University, where she was head of the Institute for Translation Studies from 2003 to 2007.

Shlesinger was head of the Language Policy Research Center at Bar-Ilan University. She developed a course in Translation in the Community at the Language Policy Research Center in order to give basic interpreting skills to students who spoke minority languages (such as Arabic, Russian or Amharic) so that they could work with recent immigrants.

On 10 November 2012 Shlesinger died of lung cancer.

== Research interests ==
- Cognitive processes in translation and interpreting
- Community Interpreting
- Corpus-based Translation Studies
- Court interpreting
- Language policy

== Awards ==
In 2001 the Copenhagen Business School made Shlesinger a Doctor honoris causa. In 2007 she was CETRA Professor at KU Leuven in Belgium. In 2010 she was awarded the Danica Seleskovitch Prize. In 2011 she was granted the Lifetime Achievement Award of the Israel Translators Association.

== Main publications ==
- With Franz Pöchhacker (eds): The Interpreting Studies Reader. Routledge, London 2002. ISBN 978-0-415-22477-2
- With Anthony Pym and Zuzana Jettmarova (eds): Sociocultural aspects of translating and interpreting. John Benjamins, Amsterdam and Philadelphia 2006. ISBN 978-90-272-1675-5
- With Franz Pöchhacker (ed.): Healthcare Interpreting: Discourse and Interaction. John Benjamins, Amsterdam and Philadelphia 2007. ISBN 978-90-272-9272-8
- With Anthony Pym and Daniel Simeoni (eds). Descriptive translation studies and beyond: Investigations in homage to Gideon Toury. John Benjamins, Amsterdam and Philadelphia 2008. ISBN 978-90-272-1684-7
- With Rodica Dimitriu (eds): Translators and their readers – in homage to Eugene A. Nida. Les Éditions du Hasard, Brussels 2009. ISBN 978-2-930154-23-7
- With Franz Pöchhacker (eds): Doing justice to court interpreting. Benjamins Current Topics, Volume 26. John Benjamins, Amsterdam and Philadelphia, 2010.
- Co-editing of the journal Interpreting: International journal of research and practice in interpreting. Amsterdam, John Benjamins, from 2003.
- Franz Pöchhacker, Arnt L. Jakobsen, Inger Mees (eds): Interpreting Studies and Beyond: A Tribute to Miriam Shlesinger. Samfundslitteratur Press, Copenhagen 2007. ISBN 978-87-593-1349-7
