= Archibald Russell (ship) =

1905 Scottish four-masted steel barque

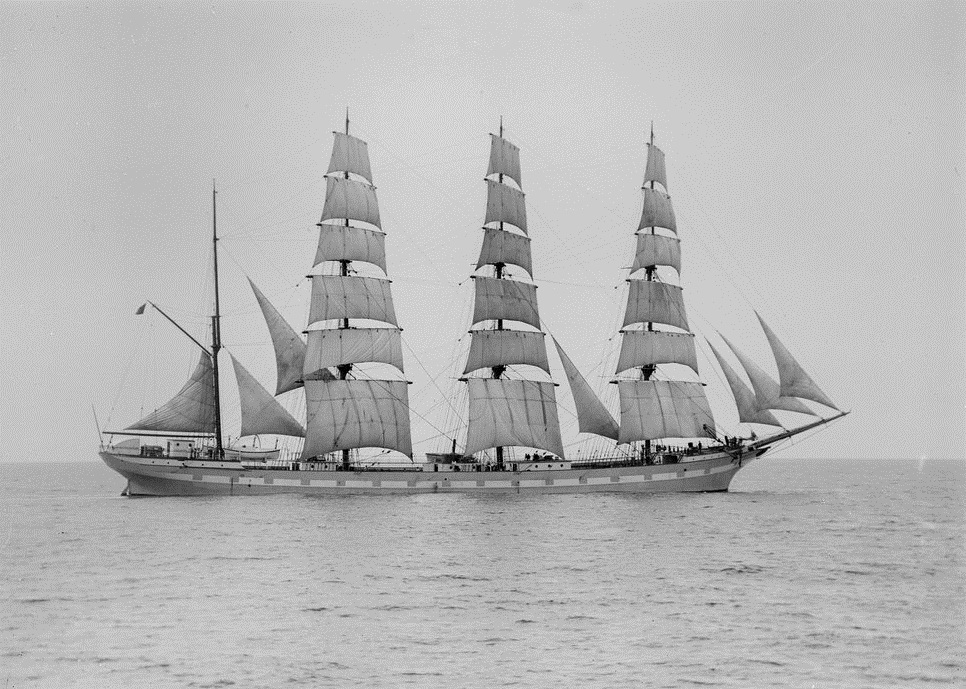
- Archibald Russell under full sail

History
- Name: Archibald Russell
- Builder: Scotts Shipbuilding and Engineering Co.
- Cost: £20,750
- Launched: 23 January 1905
- Out of service: 1948
- Fate: Broken up (1949)

General characteristics
- Type: Four-masted steel barque
- Tonnage: 2354 GRT / 2048 NRT / 3950 DWT
- Length: 291.3 ft (88.8 m)
- Beam: 42.8 ft (13 m)
- Depth: 24 ft (7.3 m)
- Propulsion: Sailing barque, four-masted
- Complement: c.30

Archibald Russell was a sailing merchantman built in 1905 by Scotts Shipbuilding and Engineering Company, Greenock, for John Hardie & Son, Glasgow. She was the last square-rigged ship to be built on the Clyde.

She was a four-masted steel barque, equipped with two 120' (36.5m) long bilge keels, and rigged with royal sails over double top-gallant sails.

The Archibald Russell sailed the world delivering a variety of cargo (including timber, grain, nitrate, and coal) to various ports in the UK, Germany, Spain, Australia, Brazil and other countries.

== History ==
Under J. Hardie & Co., Archibald Russell partook in the Chilean nitrate trade and in the Australian grain trade. She was swift and well-built and on one occasion made Australia to England laden with wheat in 93 days. She continued to sail throughout the First World War, carrying cargoes such as coal and timber in addition to her usual wares.

In 1923 she was sold for £5500 to Gustaf Erikson, who was famous for the fleet of windjammers he operated, mainly on the grain trade from Australia to Europe. A crewman on the vessel in 1929 was Australian journalist Ken Attiwill on a voyage from Melbourne to Ireland. He later wrote a book about the voyage. The ship kept sailing for Erikson until outbreak of World War II in 1939.

At one point prior to the outbreak of war in 1939 the Honourable Company of Master Mariners considered purchasing the ship to use as a floating livery hall, after it became apparent that the possibility of building a hall in the City of London had been rendered very remote. This idea was ultimately abandoned; however they later acquired and converted HMS Wellington to use for this purpose.

In June 1941 Archibald Russell was detained by the British government, after Finland joined the war on the German side. During the rest of the war, the ship was used as a store ship at Goole. After the war she was returned to her Finnish owner (in 1948), but soon after was sold to the British Iron & Steel Corporation in 1949, and broken up later that year by J.J. King & Co., of Gateshead-on-Tyne.

== See also ==
- List of large sailing vessels
