= Katie Boyle =

Italian-born British actress, presenter (1926–2018)

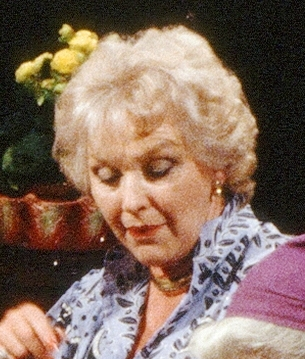
- Boyle appearing on After Dark, July 1988
- Born: Caterina Irene Elena Maria Imperiali dei Principi di Francavilla; 29 May 1926; Florence, Tuscany, Italy
- Died: 20 March 2018 (aged 91); London, England
- Other name: Lady Saunders
- Occupations: Actress; presenter; writer
- Known for: What's My Line? Eurovision Song Contest
- Spouses: Hon. Richard Bentinck Boyle (m. 1947; div. 1955) Greville Baylis (m. 1955; died 1976) Sir Peter Saunders (m. 1979; died 2003)

Caterina Irene Elena Maria Boyle, Lady Saunders (née Imperiali dei Principi di Francavilla; 29 May 1926 – 20 March 2018), usually known as Katie Boyle, was an Italian-born British actress, writer, radio announcer and television personality. She became best known for presenting the Eurovision Song Contest on a record four occasions: in 1960, 1963, 1968 and 1974; the first three in London and the last in Brighton, England. She was also an agony aunt (an advice columnist), answering problems that had been posted by readers of the TVTimes.

== Early life, modelling and film career ==
She was born on 29 May 1926 in a royal palace in Florence, Tuscany, Italy, which had once belonged to the Italian royal family, the daughter of an Italian marquis (the Marchese Demetrio Imperiali di Francavilla) and his English wife, Dorothy Kate Ramsden. She came to the United Kingdom in 1946 and started a modelling career, which included work for such publications as Vogue. She also appeared in several 1950s films, the first being Old Mother Riley Headmistress (1950) in which she was billed as Catherine Carleton, followed by I'll Never Forget You (uncredited, 1951), The Diary of Major Thompson (filmed in France in 1955), Not Wanted on Voyage (1957), The Truth About Women (also 1957) and Intent to Kill (1958).

== Radio and television ==
Boyle was an on-screen continuity announcer for the BBC in the 1950s. A decade later she became a television personality, regularly appearing on panel games and programmes such as What's My Line?, Juke Box Jury and the medical game show Lance That Boyle, on which she appeared with comedian Lance Percival. Boyle was the presenter for the 1960, 1963, 1968 and 1974 Eurovision Song Contests (all of which were hosted in the UK), making her the person who presented the most editions of the contest. She hosted the 1974 contest wearing no underwear; it had been cut off from under her satin dress moments before the broadcast began. She also hosted the UK qualifying heat, A Song for Europe, in 1961. In the 1960s she appeared in a long-running series of television advertisements for Camay soap.

Boyle was the subject of This Is Your Life in 1982, when she was surprised by Eamonn Andrews while filming in Rome. That same year she played herself in the BBC radio play The Competition, which told the story of a fictitious international song contest being staged in Bridlington. Boyle was guest of honour at the Eurovision fan club conventions staged in 1988 and 1992, and appeared at the Eurovision Song Contest 1998 held in Birmingham as a special guest of the BBC. Her other work included theatre, television (What's Up Dog?) and radio (Katie and Friends). In 2004 Boyle was a guest on a special Eurovision-themed celebrity version of Weakest Link on BBC One, hosted by Anne Robinson. Boyle became the first, and to date the only, contestant ever to vote herself off the programme.

== Personal life ==
In 1947, she married The Hon. Richard Bentinck Boyle, Viscount Boyle, a captain in the Irish Guards and heir to the 8th Earl of Shannon; the marriage was dissolved in 1955 but she kept his surname, Boyle. He succeeded to the earldom in 1963, she remarried in late 1955, to Greville Baylis, a racehorse owner, who died in 1976. In 1979, she married theatre impresario Sir Peter Saunders, who died in 2003.

A book by Nicholas Davies, Queen Elizabeth II: A Woman Who Is Not Amused, alleged that Boyle had a long-standing relationship with Prince Philip in the 1950s. Boyle told Gyles Brandreth: "It's ludicrous, pure fabrication. When it appears in print, people believe it. You can't take legal action because it fans the flames, so you just have to accept people telling complete lies about you." She was represented for most of her working life by agent Bunny Lewis. A keen owner of Poodles, Pekingese and Italian Greyhounds she was a committee member of Battersea Dogs Home for more than 25 years. She died at home in London on 20 March 2018, aged 91, from pneumonia and cerebrovascular disease.

=== Alternative crediting ===
She was also credited professionally as Catherine Boyle and Catherine Boyl.

== Filmography ==
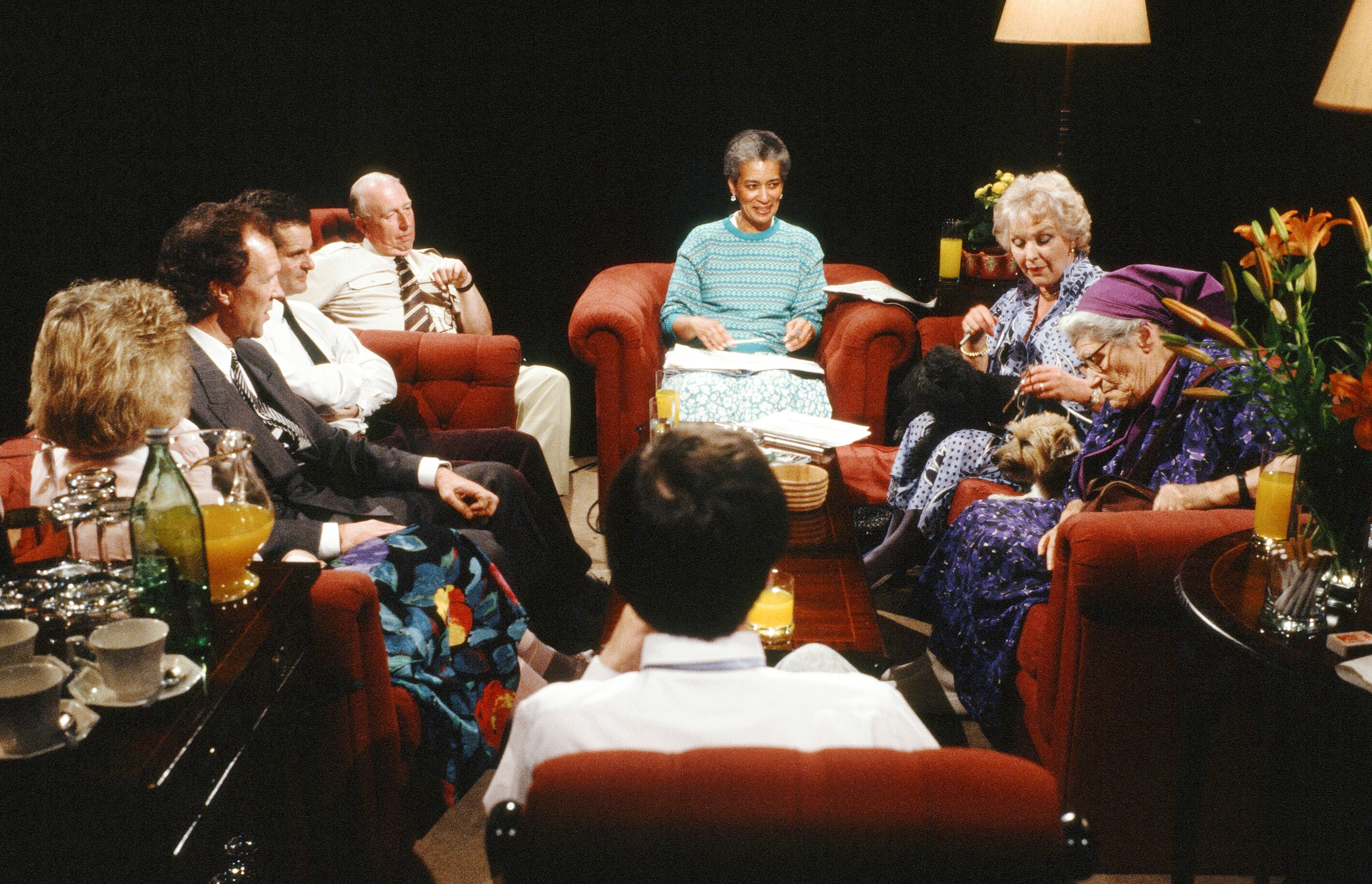
Appearing in 1988 - together with her dogs and others including Miriam Rothschild and Frank Evans - on After Dark

Year	Title	Role	Notes
1950	Old Mother Riley Headmistress	Miss Ashton	
1951	I'll Never Forget You	Girl	Uncredited
1955	The French, They Are a Funny Race	Minor Role	
1957	The Truth About Women	Diana	
1957	Not Wanted on Voyage	Julie Haines	
1958	Intent to Kill	Margaret McLaurin	
1959	First Love	Luciana	

== Bibliography ==
She also wrote four books:

- Dear Katie – tips from her days as agony aunt for TV Times, 1975, ISBN 978-0552990783
- What This Katie Did – autobiography, 1980, ISBN 978-0297778141
- Boyle's Law - household tips, 1982, ISBN 978-0297781486
- Battersea Tales – stories of rescues from the Battersea Dogs Home, 1997

== See also ==
- List of Eurovision Song Contest presenters

Preceded by (France) Jacqueline Joubert	Eurovision Song Contest presenter 1960	Succeeded by (France) Jacqueline Joubert
Preceded by (Luxembourg) Mireille Delannoy	Eurovision Song Contest presenter 1963	Succeeded by (Denmark) Lotte Wæver
Preceded by (Austria) Erica Vaal	Eurovision Song Contest presenter 1968	Succeeded by (Spain) Laurita Valenzuela
Preceded by (Luxembourg) Helga Guitton	Eurovision Song Contest presenter 1974	Succeeded by (Sweden) Karin Falck
