= Martina Wachendorff =

German translator and literary editor

Martina Wachendorff (born 1953) is a German author, translator and editor working in France.

Since the early 1990s, Martina Wachendorff has worked as an editor at the Actes Sud publishing house. She publishes the Lettres allesandes and Cactus book series. Wachendorff has published two novels, both in French.

Wachendorff edited the French translations of Andreas Latzko's People in War, Paul Nizon's The Year of Love, Dieter Hildebrandt's the novel Pianoforte or the Novel of the Piano in the 19th Century, Bodo Morshäuser's Hauptsache Deutsch, Sebastian Haffner's Story of a German and Wilhelm von Humboldt's Paris diary. She also managed the translation of Oliver Lubrich 's edited Journeys into the Reich 1933–1945. She edited an edition of W. G. Sebald's works. She recruited Juli Zeh and Daniel Kehlmann as resident authors. She edited fifteen works from the Hungarian, by Imre Kertész and Attila Bartis A nyugalom at Actes Sud.

She accompanied many German authors on their visits to France, including to the Salon de la Littérature Européenne de Cognac. In 2013, she responded to a commentary by the German writer Michael Kumpfmüller, who felt badly treated at the awarding of the Jean-Monnet Prize for European Literature.

== Works ==
- Le baiser électrique: roman. Paris : Gallimard, 2001. ISBN 2-07-076211-4
- L'impossible enfant. Paris : Éditions Payot & Rivages, 2007. (Rivages/Noir 657.) ISBN 978-2-7436-1704-2
