= Pierre-Eugène Lamairesse =

French engineer and indologist

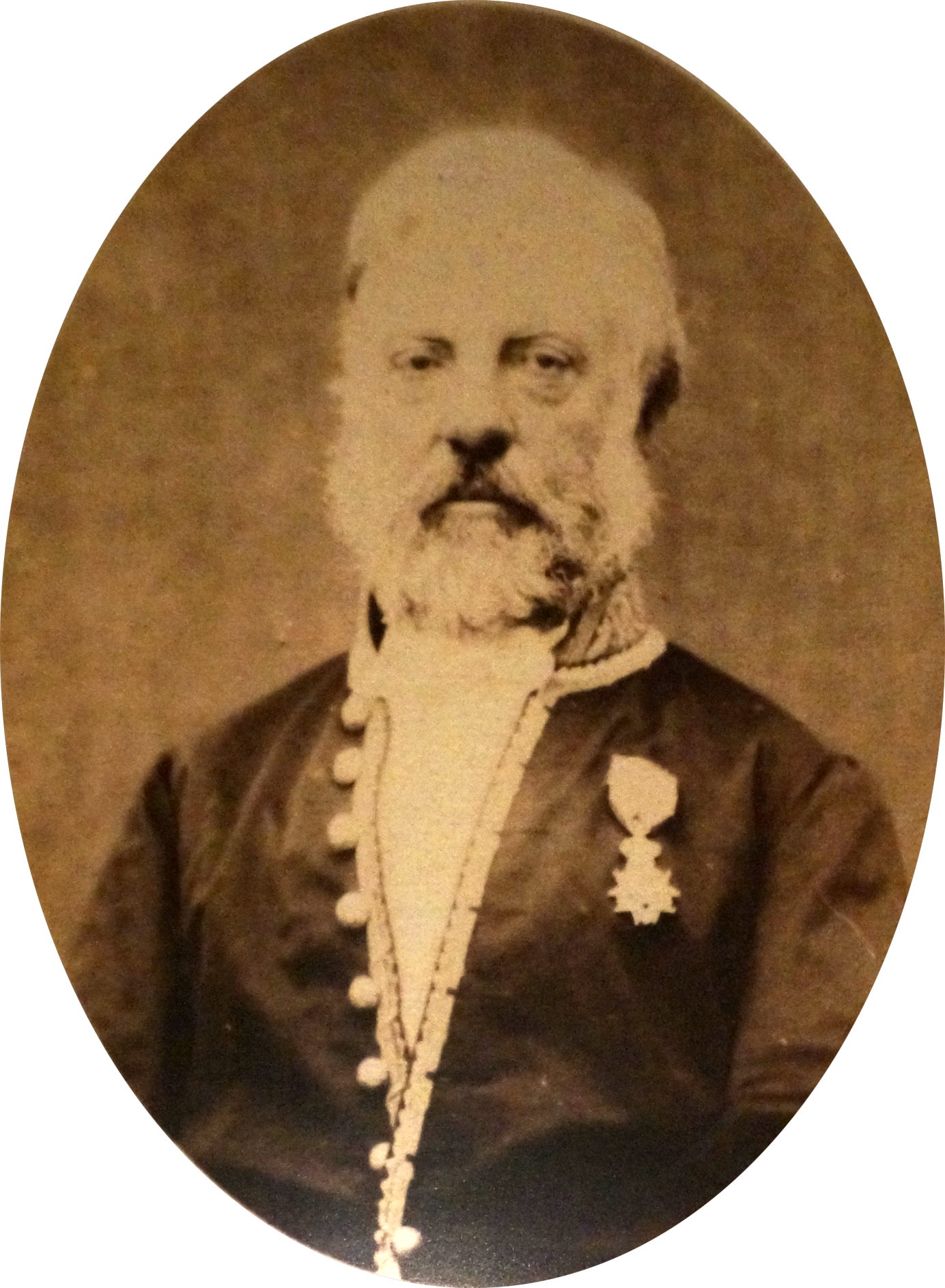
- Pierre-Eugène Lamairesse around 1872
- Born: 14 July 1817; Châlons-en-Champagne, France
- Died: 17 April 1898; Marengo (Present-day Hadjout), Algeria
- Education: Civil engineering
- Alma mater: École Polytechnique
- Occupations: Civil and mining engineer, Indologist
- Known for: Third translator of Tirukkural into French
- Notable work: Tirukkural (1867); Kamasutra (1891); Prem Sagar (1893)
- Father: Jean-Baptiste-Cyprien Lamairesse
- Awards: Knight of the Legion of Honor

Pierre-Eugène Lamairesse (14 July 1817 – 17 April 1898) was a French civil and mining engineer. A former student of the École Polytechnique, he was in charge of dams and other irrigation projects in Pondicherry and Karaikal in India between 1860 and 1866. He is best known for his translation of the Tirukkural and other ancient Indian works into French.

== Early life ==
Lamairesse was born on 14 July 1817 in Châlons-en-Champagne, France. He was the youngest son of Jean-Baptiste-Cyprien Lamairesse, a farmer and member of the Agricultural Society of Châlons. He graduated from the École Polytechnique.

== Career ==
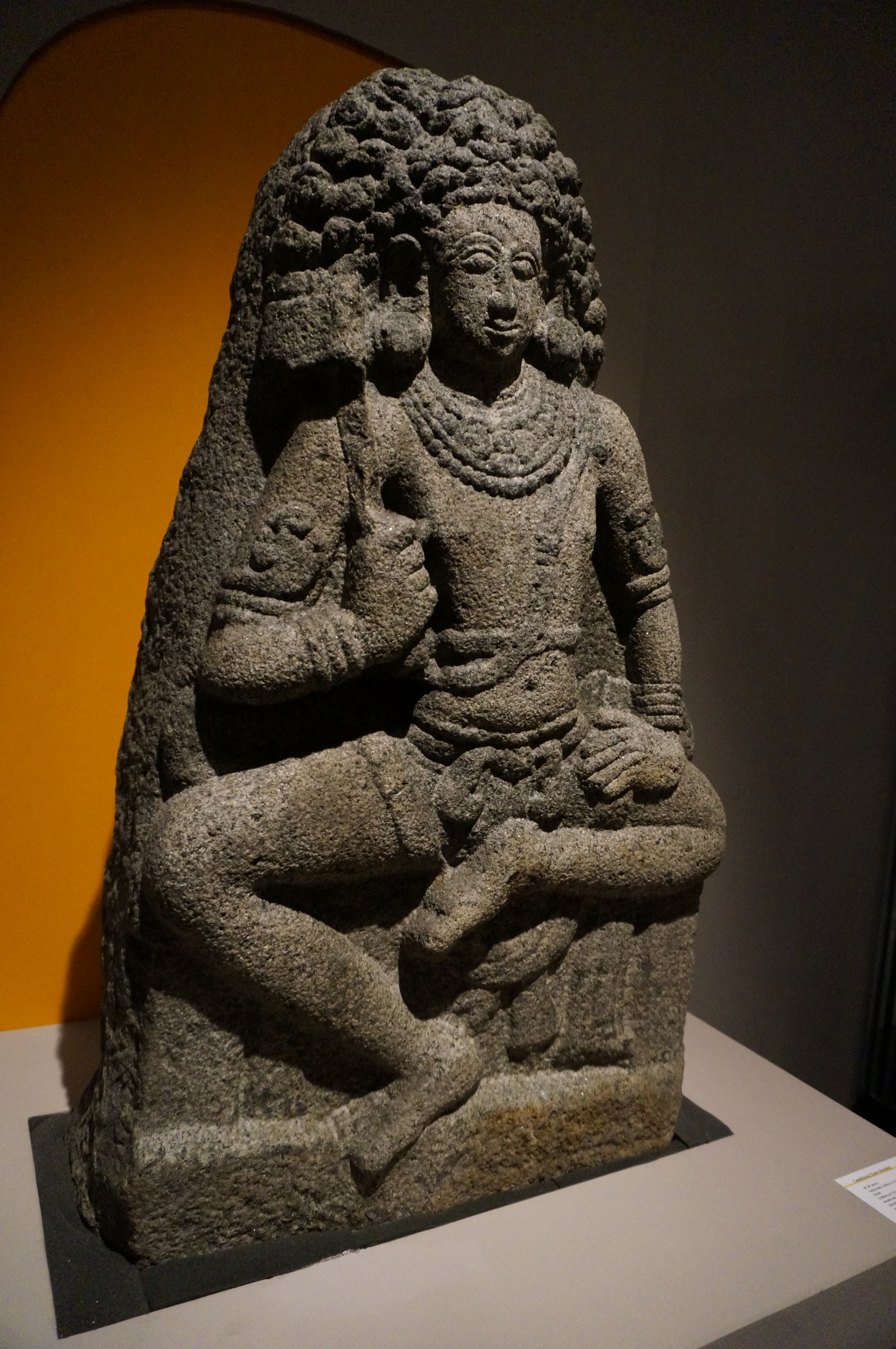
Statue of Chandeshvara (ninth century CE), one of the 63 Nayanars, at the Museum of Fine Arts and Archeology of Châlons-en-Champagne.

During his stay in India, Lamairesse supervised many irrigation projects in Pondicherry and Karaikal between 1860 and 1866. With the help of the government in Madras, he transported a large collection of statues from several abandoned temples of the Tamil land, which were presented at the World Fairs of 1867 and 1878 and later offered to the Museum of Fine Arts and Archeology at Châlons-en-Champagne.

== Literary works ==
A polyglot, he translated many South Indian works including the Tirukkural. His Kural translation was published in 1867. He also wrote on various subjects such as Japanese civilization, the Koran, the Buddha, and the hydrology of France, Algeria and India. Towards the end of his career, he moved to Algeria. His other translations include the Kamasutra (1891) and Prem Sagar (1893). He died on 17 April 1898 in Marengo (present-day Hadjout).

== See also ==
- Tirukkural translations
- Tirukkural translations into French
- List of translators
