= Evadne Price =

Australian-British writer, actress, astrologer and media personality (1888–1985)

Eva Grace Price
- Born: Eva Grace Price; 28 August 1888; Merewether, New South Wales, Australia
- Died: 17 April 1985 (aged 96); Sydney, Australia
- Citizenship: British
- Occupations: Actress, writer
- Spouse(s): 1: Henry A. Dabelstein (1909–1972); 2: Charles A. Fletcher (1920–1924); 3: Kenneth Andrew Attiwill (1939–1982)
- Writing career
- Pen name: Evadne Price; Helen Zenna Smith
- Language: English
- Period: 1908–1985
- Genres: Children's, Romance, War, Modernism
- Notable work: Not So Quiet: Stepdaughters of War

Evadne Price (28 August 1888 – 17 April 1985), probably born Eva Grace Price, was an Australian British writer, actress, astrologer and media personality. She also wrote under the pseudonym Helen Zenna Smith.

She is now best remembered for her World War I novel Not So Quiet (published in America as Stepdaughters of War) which adapts the style of Erich Maria Remarque's All Quiet on the Western Front to depict the experiences of British female ambulance drivers. During her lifetime she was known for her many romance novels, some of which were serialised in national newspapers, as well as for her children's books starring the popular character Jane Turpin. In the 1950s, she became a regular performer on television, as a storyteller and astrologer. For 25 years she published a monthly astrology column in SHE magazine.

== Biography ==
=== Early years and first marriage ===
Evadne Price's own account of her early life contains contradictions. Birth years of 1896 and 1901 found in various sources are impossible since she was married in 1909. Evidence indicates she was born Eva Grace Price on 28 August 1888 in Merewether, New South Wales, Australia (NSW Registry of BDM cert. no. 1888/032162). The Oxford Dictionary of National Biography follows the Times obituarist in accepting her own claim that she was born at sea in 1896 but there is no birth certificate to support this. Price cannot be found in the 1901 or 1911 British census listings. In the 1921 census, Evadne Grace Lynn Price, actress, gives her birthplace as New South Wales (stating her age as 26). In "SHE Stargazes" Evadne gives her birth date as 28 August (p. 82). Evadne's claim that her parents were British (ie British subjects) may or may not be reliable: BDM records show that both parents were born in NSW, Australia. Her father, Jonathan Dixon Price, was a miner. He died in 1921, not, as Evadne claimed, during her teens.

"Newcastle Girl is Film Writer" (Newcastle Morning Herald, 20 June 1939, p. 6) reports that Evadne Price/Helen Zenna Smith was born in Merewether and attended the Junction School in Merewether.

In July 1902, Price obtained a bursary at the Maitland High School. In 1903, she attended the Largs Public School near Maitland. She performed in the end-of-year school concerts at these establishments, giving recitations (as reported in the Maitland Daily Mercury).

In her late teens, Price was familiar to Newcastle audiences as an elocutionist.

In 1908, Price played the First Twin in Australia's first production of "Peter Pan".

On her 21st birthday, 28 August 1909, Eva Grace Price, actress, daughter of Jonathan Dixon Price, married a German-born actor Henry A. Dabelstein in Sydney (NSW Registry of BDM cert. no. 1909/007059). Henry used the stage name Harry Preston.

=== Moving to England and second marriage ===
In 1910, Price left Australia for London. Unable to find work there she went on to New York where she found a job in a burlesque variety show. She returned to the UK in 1912 advertising herself in The Stage newspaper as Miss Eva Price (Mrs Harry A. Preston). Harry started a new life in the USA calling himself Robert Harry Preston. US Draft Registration Cards for 1917-1918 and 1942 show him living in New York where, according to the US Social Security Death Index, he died in October 1972.

From 1912 to 1916, Price secured roles in provincial tours of dramatic productions: The Girl Who Knew A Bit (1912), Mr Wu (1914), Oh I Say (1915), Within The Law (1916). In 1915 she changed "Eva" to the more evocative "Evadne" (Dumfries & Galloway Standard, 25 August 1915 p. 3) and invented a new persona for herself, claiming to have been born at sea of British parents and considerably understating her age.

In 1917-1918, Price is reported to have worked in the Air Ministry where she probably met Dorothy Fletcher, the sister of her second husband-to-be, Charles Alexander Fletcher (1894–1924). He was the eldest son of Canon Edward Sumner Bicknell Fletcher, Rector of Kibworth. The couple married in 1920. Price claimed to be a spinster on the GRO registration form. Fletcher was a Captain in the Devonshire Regiment. After the war he was appointed to a government post in the Sudan. He died there in 1924 from blackwater fever. On the 1921 census form Evadne Price had listed her marital status as 'single'. No records of a divorce from her first husband can be found so she probably kept her second marriage secret to avoid being discovered committing bigamy.

Price resumed her stage career in 1919 until 1923 when she turned to journalism.

=== Third marriage and World War II ===
In 1939, Evadne Fletcher married the Australian writer, Kenneth Andrew Attiwill alias Ken Attiwill (1906-1992) in Kent, England. The couple co-wrote a number of books and plays. They also later wrote scripts for the British television soap-opera Crossroads.

She was the war correspondent for The People from 1943, covering the Allied invasion of Europe and many major war stories, including the Nuremberg Trials. She was the first woman journalist to enter the Belsen concentration camp. Her husband was a prisoner of war in Japan, and was presumed dead for two years.

=== Writing career ===
As a journalist, Evadne wrote a column for the Sunday Chronicle and contributed to other newspapers. She also began contributing short stories to the fiction magazines of the period. Many of these are comic, and her most notable successes were the Jane Turpin stories, about a female equivalent of Richmal Crompton's William. These were published in the Novel magazine from 1928, and then in books, beginning with Just Jane (1928). There were ten collections of Jane stories, finishing with Jane at War (1947). Price, however, did not take kindly to Jane stories being referred to as a copy of the William series. She went on record saying she "had never heard of William", even though William stories were regularly advertised on Jane book dust jackets.

The famous illustrator Thomas Henry illustrated both Jane and William books, but signed the illustrations for the Jane books as "Marriott", to distinguish the two series.

=== Helen Zenna Smith ===
In 1930, Albert E. Marriott, who had recently started a publishing company, asked Evadne Price, who was known for her skill at pastiche, to write a parodic version of Erich Maria Remarque's All Quiet on the Western Front, featuring women at war; his suggested title was All Quaint on the Western Front. By her own account she took Remarque's book home to read and decided: 'Anyone who wants a skit on this book wants their brains dusted.'. She told him that he should publish an authentic account of women at war, and he asked her to write it, despite her protests that she was too young to know anything about the war. He offered her £50 if she could bring him 20,000 words by Monday morning. Through an acquaintance she met Winifred Constance Young, who had been a wartime volunteer ambulance driver (VAD). Young lent Price her wartime diary, and the 20,000 words were written in less than forty-eight hours. Price recounts that Marriott was so delighted with her work that he immediately took the carbon copy to the News of the World, who paid him £5000. It is likely that in making this deal he represented the writing as a first-hand account rather than a piece of historical fiction. If there was dishonesty or misrepresentation, there is no direct proof that Evadne Price was actively complicit in it; late in life, in an interview, she presented herself as a complete innocent manipulated by Marriott.

The book Not So Quiet... was published as by Helen Zenna Smith, which was also the name of its central character. The book's jacket presents it as: 'An honest, unsentimental, savage record of a girl ambulance driver in France.' and claims: 'This is not a story.' These claims for authenticity persuaded reviewers to treat the book as a record of the author's own experience. The Manchester Guardian critic wrote: 'The author was attached to a convoy under the command of a domineering and heartless commandant, where the drivers suffered every discomfort of bad food, lack of sleep, dirt and petty tyranny.'

The book was an immediate success, and Marriott employed young women to drive around London in ambulances to publicise it. It was translated into French as Pas Si Calme and published by Gallimard, Paris in 1931. It was translated into Spanish as Hay novedad en el frente...: (Hijastras de Guerra), in 1935. In the Netherlands it and two sequels were translated as a trilogy: Gij vrouwen....!, Vrouwen in nood and Vrouwenroeping. In Germany she was compared to Adrienne Thomas, whose book, Katrin becomes a soldier was published in 1930.

Shortly after the publication of Not So Quiet..., according to Evadne Price's later account, the publisher Albert E. Marriott committed fraud by forging a letter on Buckingham Palace notepaper claiming to have the rights to Queen Mary's memoirs. He sold these to the Daily Mail for a considerable advance, and then absconded. According to her own account, it was only at this time that she discovered that 'Albert E. Marriott' was a pseudonym of Netley Lucas, a career criminal.

Marriott/Lucas became bankrupt, but because he had paid her nothing, Price's copyrights did not go to his creditors. They remained her property, and Not So Quiet... was republished by Newnes, in a format that presented it as more obviously fictional. Four sequels to Not So Quiet were also published by Newnes. These were: Women of the Aftermath (1931); Shadow Women (1932); Luxury Ladies (1933); and They Lived With Me (1934). These books are written in the same dramatic style as Not So Quiet..., and take the same heroine into the challenges of the 1920s. They touch on such social issues as the care of the war-wounded; post-war decadence; eugenics; and the fate of destitute women in London.

=== Romance novel author ===
Under her own name, Evadne Price was a successful writer of thrillers and romance novels. Thrillers such as Red for Danger and The Phantom Light were filmed. She wrote over 150 paperback novelettes for cheaply produced series such as The Lucky Star Library, The Glamour Library and The Silver Star Library, as well as longer romance novels that were published in hardback. She was a vice-president of the Romantic Novelists' Association.

=== Playwright and screenwriter ===
Price's career as a romance novelist took her into playwriting, radio scriptwriting and screenwriting. Her play Big Ben, written for the Malvern Festival in 1939, was a successful one (The Times called it "a large, comfortable play with a soul to call its own"). The Phantom Light (1937) was a stage version of her novel, The Haunted Light. The play was also made into a film starring Gordon Harker. Once a Crook (1939) - a play which was co-written by Price and her husband Ken Attiwill, was filmed in 1941. She also acted in the movie Trouble with Junia (1967) in the minor part of Miss Hallyday, beside her husband Ken Attiwill. In 1965, she and Ken Attiwill joined the scriptwriting team of the ATV soap opera Crossroads

=== Astrology ===
Price had a parallel career as a broadcaster during the early years of British television. Her afternoon horoscope show called "Fun with the Stars" led to regular appearances on the lunchtime chat and music show Lunchbox, with Noele Gordon. Price was dubbed the "new astrologer extraordinaire" for twenty-five years for the SHE magazine and published a successful collection of these columns as SHE Stargazes. When she and her husband retired to their native Australia in 1976, Price wrote the monthly horoscope column for Australian Vogue. She also appeared weekly on the ITV Central evening news magazine show with a 5-minute astrological reading, and she would always close with the catchphrase "think lucky and you'll be lucky".

=== Final years ===
Price died on 17 April 1985 in Sydney, Australia, aged 96. Her unfinished autobiography was to have been named Mother Painted Nude.

=== Posthumous reputation ===
In the year of Price's death, a selection of the Jane Turpin stories was published as Jane and Co, with an introduction by Mary Cadogan (London: Macmillan, 1985).

In 1989, Not So Quiet... was republished to acclaim by The Feminist Press, New York, and later by Virago in the UK.

The Feminist Press edition included a discursive afterword by Jane Marcus, which explained much of the story of the book's origins, but the back cover describes it as 'a scathing firsthand account of war from the point of view of women actively engaged in it', which may have allowed some readers to overestimate its authenticity.

Since then there have been notable critical accounts of the novel by Angela K. Smith in The Second Battlefield: Women, Modernism and the First World War, and by Alison Hennegan in 'Fighting the peace: Two women's accounts of the post-war years', an essay included in The Silent Morning: Culture and Memory After the Armistice, a collection edited by Trudi Tate and Kate Kennedy.

== Bibliography ==
=== As Evadne Price ===
==== Jane Series ====
NB: All "Jane" books were published by Robert Hale, London unless otherwise mentioned

1. Just Jane, John Hamilton, London (1928)
2. Meet Jane, Albert E. Marriott, London (1930)
3. Enter - Jane, Newnes, London (1932)
4. Jane the Fourth (1937)
5. Jane the Sleuth (1939)
6. Jane the Unlucky (1939)
7. Jane the Popular (1939)
8. Jane the Patient (1940)
9. Jane Gets Busy (1940)
10. Jane at War (1947)
- Jane and Co. (selected stories, with an introduction by Mary Cadogan ) Macmillan Publishers (1985)

==== Single novels ====
- Diary of a Red-haired Girl (1932)
- The Haunted Light (1933)
- Strip Girl! (1934)
- Probationer! (Hurst & Blackett) (1934)
- Society Girl! (1935)
- Red for Danger, John Long, London (1936) (filmed as Blondes for Danger in 1938)
- Glamour Girl (1937)
- The Wrong Mrs. Sylvester (1930s)
- Escape to Marriage (1951)
- The Dishonoured Wife (1951)
- My Pretty Sister, Herbert Jenkins Ltd (1952)
- Her Stolen Life, Merit Books, London (1954)
- What the Heart Says (Robert Hale, 1956)
- The Love Trap (1958)
- My Platonic Wife (1950s)
- Air Hostess in Love (1962)

=== Astrology ===
- 'She' Stargazes, National Magazine Company, London (1965)

=== As Helen Zenna Smith ===
Stepdaughters of War series

1. Not So Quiet..., Albert E. Marriott, London (1930); as Stepdaughters of War, New York, Dutton (1930).
2. Women of the Aftermath, John Long (1931); as One Woman's Freedom, New York, Longman (1932)
3. Shadow Women (1932)
4. Luxury Ladies (1933)
5. They Lived With Me (1934)

== Known discography ==
- The Christmas Story, Narration by Evadne Price, LP, Label: Ember

== Broadway credits ==
- Stepdaughters of War, based on the novel by Helen Zenna Smith, Empire Theatre (started 6 October 1930 for 24 performances)

== Filmography ==
- The Phantom Light (1935) (playwright The Haunted Light)
- Wolf's Clothing (1936) (play author, screenwriter)
- When the Poppies Bloom Again (1937) (script)
- Merry Comes to Town a.k.a. Merry Comes to Stay (UK: alternative title) (1937) (short story author)
- Silver Top (1938) (short story author)
- Lightning Conductor (1938) (short story author)
- Blondes for Danger (1938) (novel author)
- Once a Crook (1941) (play author)
- Not Wanted on Voyage (1957) (play author, screenwriter)
- Trouble with Junia (1967) (actress)

== References and sources ==
Who's Who in the Theatre, 11th Edition, 1952 p. 1175

Afterword by Jane Marcus, Not So Quiet...Stepdaughters of War, Evadne Price, The Feminist Press, 1989.

Adrienne Thomas: DIE KATRIN WIRD SOLDAT und Anderes aus Lothringen, Röhrig Universitätsverlag, St. Ingbert 2008, 510 S., 37 Abb., ISBN 978-3-86110-455-1
