= Gnanou Diagou =

Indian lawyer

- Born: 1877; Pondicherry, India
- Died: 1959 (aged 81–82)
- Occupation: Lawyer
- Known for: Translating Tirukkural into French
- Children: Dairianadin, Cojande

Gnanou Diagou (1877–1959) was a lawyer and professor of law in Pondicherry, India. He is known for translating the Tirukkural into French.

== Biography ==
Gnanou Diagou hailed from a Catholic family from Pondicherry. He obtained his law degree from the Faculty of Aix in 1902. He served as president of the Pondicherry Bar Association from 1934. He was also a professor of Law at Pondicherry Law School. In 1911, he founded the Historical Society of Pondicherry. He was also known as historian of French India. He translated Tamil texts into French. In 1942, he translated the Tirukkural, an ancient Tamil classic, into French.

== Works ==
Note: Years indicated are dates of editions.

- Le droit civil applicable aux Musulmans de l'Inde (1984)
- Koural by Tiruvaḷḷuvar (1942, 1968)
- Arrêts du Conseil supérieur de Pondichéry (1935)
- Assara Kovai: Traduit du tamoul (1950, 1963, 1971)
- Arà néry sarom: L'Essence du chemin de la vertu (1965)
- Histoire détaillée des rois du Carnatic (1939)
- Principes de droit hindou (1929)
- Ramayana de Kambar: Sundara kandam (livre de la beaute) (1972)
- Principes de Droit hindou (1929)
- Naladiyar (1946)
- Nanmanikkadikai (1954)

== See also ==
- Tirukkural translations
- Tirukkural translations into French
- List of translators
