= Louis Jacolliot =

French barrister, judge, author and lecturer (1837–1890)

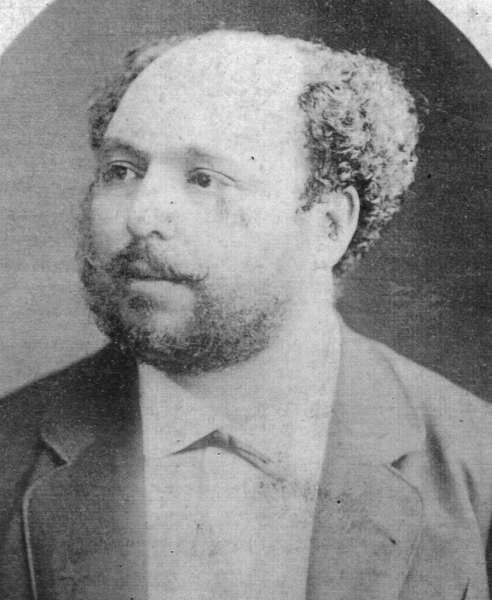
- Born: 31 October 1837; Charolles, Saône-et-Loire, France
- Died: 30 October 1890 (aged 52); Saint-Thibault-des-Vignes, Seine-et-Marne, France
- Occupations: Writer; barrister; judge; lecturer
- Writing career
- Language: French
- Genres: Historical novel; adventures

Louis Jacolliot (31 October 1837 – 30 October 1890) was a French barrister, colonial judge, author and lecturer.

== Biography ==
Born in Charolles, Saône-et-Loire, he lived several years in Tahiti and India during the period 1865-1869.

Jacolliot's Occult science in India (French Le spiritisme dans le monde) was written during the 1860s and published 1875 (English translation 1884). Jacolliot was searching for the "Indian roots of western occultism" and makes reference to an otherwise unknown Sanskrit text he calls Agrouchada-Parikchai, which is apparently Jacolliot's personal invention, a "pastiche" of elements taken from Upanishads, Dharmashastras and "a bit of Freemasonry". Jacolliot also expounds his belief in a lost Pacific continent, and was quoted on this by Helena Blavatsky in Isis Unveiled in support of her own Lemuria.

In Jacolliot's book La Bible dans l'Inde, Vie de Iezeus Christna (1869) (transl. The Bible in India, or the Life of Iezeus Christna), he compares the accounts of the life of Bhagavan Krishna with that of Jesus Christ in the Gospels and concludes that it could not have been a coincidence, so similar are the stories in so many details in his opinion. He concludes that the account in the Gospels is a myth based on the mythology of ancient India. Jacolliot does not claim that Jesus was in India as some have claimed. "Christna" is his way of spelling "Krishna" and he wrote that Krishna's disciples gave him the name "Iezeus" which means "pure essence" in Sanskrit. However, Sanskrit philologist Max Müller confirmed that it is not a Sanskrit term at all and "it was simply invented" by Jacolliot.

Jacolliot was successfully sued for defamation by Father Honoré Laval ss.cc, and ordered by the Supreme Court of the State of the Protectorate of the Society Islands to pay 15,000 francs in damages. It ordered the suppression of those portions of the pamphlet "La verité sur Tahiti" deemed defamatory, and further ordered that the judgement be printed in the official journal of the Protectorate in French, English, and Tahitian, as well as in three newspapers of the French colonies, three journals of Paris, and four gazettes of provinces of Laval's choosing.

He has been described as a prolific writer for his time. During his time in India he collected Sanskrit myths, which he popularized later starting in his Histoire des Vierges. Les Peuples et les continents disparus (1874). Among other things, he claimed that Hindu writings (or unspecified "Sanskrit tablets") would tell the story of a sunken land called "Rutas" in the Indian Ocean. However, he relocated this lost continent to the Pacific Ocean and linked it to the Atlantis-myth. Furthermore, his "discovery" of Rutas is somehow similar to the origin of the Mu-Story.

Among his works is a translation of the Manu Smriti. This work influenced Friedrich Nietzsche: see Tschandala. Between 1867 and 1876, he also translated select verses of the Tirukkural, an ancient Tamil classic on ethics and morality.

He also created the popular occultist concept of Agartha in his 1873 book Les fils de Dieu (lit. 'The Sons of God' or lit. 'God's Sons'). In it, he wrote of Agartha as an ancient powerful Indian city. The idea became popular in the world of occultism and spread through the writings of several different occultists; these later versions were quite different from Jacolliot's, particularly in their portrayal of Agartha as being underground and still existing.

He died in Saint-Thibault-des-Vignes, Seine-et-Marne.

== Works ==
- La Devadassi (1868)
- La Bible dans l'Inde, ou la Vie de Iezeus Christna (The Bible in India or The life of Iezeus Christna) (1869)
- Les Fils de Dieu (The Sons of God) (1873)
- Christna et le Christ (Christna and Christ) (1874)
- Histoire des Vierges. Les Peuples et les continents disparus (History of the Virgins. Vanished People and Continents) (1874)
- La Genèse de l'Humanité. Fétichisme, polythéisme, monothéisme (Genesis of Mankind. Fetichism, polytheism, monotheism) (1875)
- Le Spiritisme dans le monde, L'initiation et les sciences occultes dans l'Inde et chez tous les peuples de l'antiquité, Paris: Lacroix, 1875, 1879, reprint Geneve, Paris: Slatkine 1981.
  - translated into English as Occult science in India and among the ancients, with an account of their mystic initiations, and the history of spiritism, New York: Lovell/ London 1884, reprinted 1901, 1919; New Hyde Park, N.Y.: University Books 1971.
- Les Traditions Indo-européennes et Africaines (Indo-European and African Traditions) (1876)
- Pariah dans l'Humanité (The Outcasts in the History of Mankind) (1876)
- Les Législateurs religieux : Manou, Moïse, Mahomet (Religious Lawmakers : Manu, Moses, Muhammad) (1876)
- La Femme dans l'Inde (Women in India) (1877)
- Rois, prêtres et castes (Kings, Clergy and Castes) (1877)
- L'Olympe brahmanique. La mythologie de Manou (The Brahmanic Pantheon. Manu's Mythology) (1881)
- Fakirs et bayadères (Fakirs and Devadasi) (1904)
- La Vérité sur Tahiti
- Voyage au pays des Bayadères (Journey to the Land of the Devadasi) (1873)
- Voyage au pays des perles (Journey to the Land of the Pearls) I (1874)
- Voyage au pays des éléphants (Journey to the Land of the Elephants)II (1876)
- Second voyage au pays des éléphants III (Second Journey to the Land of the Elephants) (1877)
- Voyage aux ruines de Golconde et à la cité des morts - Indoustan I (Journey to the ruins of Golkonda and the City of the Dead) (1875)
- Voyage aux pays des Brahmes II (Journey to the Land of Brahmans) (1878)
- Voyage au pays du Hatschisch III (Journey to the Land of Hachisch) (1883)
- Voyage au pays de la Liberté : la vie communale aux Etats-Unis (Journey to the Land of Freedom: Community Life in the United-States of America) (1876)
- Voyage aux rives du Niger, au Bénin et dans le Borgou I (Journey to the Banks of the Niger River, Benin and Borgu) (1879)
- Voyage aux pays mystérieux. Du Bénin au pays des Yébous; chez les Yébous - Tchadé II (1880)
- Voyage au pays des singes III (1883)
- Voyage au pays des fakirs charmeurs (1881)
- Voyage au pays des palmiers (1884)
- Voyage humoristique au pays des kangourous I (1884)
- Voyage dans le buisson australien II (1884)
- Voyage au pays des Jungles. Les Femmes dans l'Inde (1889)
- Trois mois sur le Gange et le Brahmapoutre. Ecrit par Madame Louis Jacolliot née Marguerite Faye (1875)
- Taïti, le crime de Pitcairn, souvenirs de voyages en Océanie (1878)
- La Côte d'Ebène. Le dernier des négriers I (1876)
- La Côte d'Ivoire. L'homme des déserts II (1877)
- La Cité des sables. El Temin III (1877)
- Les Pêcheurs de nacre IV (1883)
- L'Afrique mystérieuse I, II, III (1877); I, II, III, IV (1884)
- Les Mangeurs de feu (The Fire Eaters) (1887)
- Vengeance de forçats (The Convict's Revenge) (1888)
- Les Chasseurs d'esclaves (Slave Hunter) (1888)
- Le Coureur des jungles (1888)
- Les Ravageurs de la mer (1890)
- Perdus sur l'océan (Lost upon the Ocean) (1893)
- Les Mouches du coche (1880)
- Le Crime du moulin d'Usor (1888)
- L'Affaire de la rue de la Banque. Un mystérieux assassin (1890)
- Scènes de la vie de mer. Le capitaine de vaisseau (1890)
- Un Policier de génie. Le mariage de Galuchon (1890)
- Scènes de la vie de mer. Mémoires d'un lieutenant de vaisseau (1891)
- L'Affaire de la rue de la Banque. Le Père Lafouine (1892)
- La vérité sur Taïti. Affaire de la Roncière (1869)
- Ceylan et les Cinghalais (1883)
- La Genèse de la terre et de l'humanité I (1884)
- Le Monde primitif, les lois naturelles, les lois sociales II (1884)
- Les Animaux sauvages (1884)

== See also ==
- Tirukkural translations into French
