= E. S. Ariel =

- Born: France
- Occupation: Indologist
- Known for: Second translator of Tirukkural into French
- Notable work: Tirukkural (1848)

E. S. Ariel, also referred to as Monsieur Ariel (French for "Mr. Ariel") by his contemporaries, was a 19th-century French translator known for his French translation of the ancient Indian philosophical text of the Tirukkural. He translated select couplets of the Tirukkural into French in 1848 and published it in Paris under the title Kural de Thiruvalluvar (Traduits du Tamoul). Although the first French translation of the Kural text was made by an unknown author in 1767, which Ariel had mentioned in his work, it was Ariel's translation that brought the ancient work to the French world.

== Quotations ==
In a letter to Burnouf published in the Journal Asiatique (November–December 1848), Ariel called the Kural text,

the masterpiece of Tamil literature—one of the highest and purest expressions of human thought. That which above all is wonderful in the Kural is a fact that its author addresses himself without regard to castes, peoples or beliefs to the whole community of mankind; the fact that he formulates sovereign morality and absolute reason; that he proclaims in their very essence, in their eternal abstractness, virtue and truth; that he presents, as it were in one group, the highest laws of domestic and social life; that he is equally perfect in thought, in language and in poetry in the austere metaphysial contemplation of the great mysteries of the Divine Nature as in the easy and graceful analysis of the tenderest emotions of the heart.

He also famously said of the Tirukkural thus: "Ce livre sans nom, par un auteur sans nom" ("The book without a name by an author without a name.")

== See also ==
- Tirukkural translations
- Tirukkural translations into French
- List of translators
