= Danica Seleskovitch =

- Born: 6 December 1921; Paris (France)
- Died: 17 April 2001 (aged 79); Cahors (France)
- Known for: The Interpretive Theory of Translation
- Scientific career
- Fields: Translation studies
- Workplaces: ESIT - Université Paris III - Sorbonne Nouvelle

Danica Seleskovitch (December 6, 1921 – April 17, 2001) was a French conference interpreter, teacher and prolific academic writer on translation studies. Among other career milestones, she founded the Interpretive Theory of Translation.

== Biography ==
Danica Seleskovitch was born in Paris to a French mother, from a bourgeois family from Northern France, and a Serbian father, a philosopher descended from a long line of Serbian intellectuals. After her mother’s tragic death when she was only four, Danica and her elder brother Zoran were placed in the care of their loving maternal grandmother. They were reunited with their father in 1931 in Berlin, where he had remarried and was teaching at the university. Danica did all her secondary schooling in Germany. When war broke out in 1939 she returned to Belgrade with her family and spent the whole of the war there. In 1945 she was awarded a French government scholarship and returned to Paris to escape from the communist regime founded by Marshal Josip Broz Tito.

From early childhood, she spoke several languages. Her mother tongue was French, as the Seleskovitch family had always spoken French, but she also spoke fluent German as well as her father’s language, Serbo-Croat. She did well in English at high school and perfected it during a stay in the United States in the early 1950s.

After arriving in Paris in 1946, she enrolled at the Sorbonne and pursued two bachelor's degrees simultaneously, in German and English. She began preparing for the Agrégation but had to cut her studies short when her French government scholarship ended and her father, who remained in Yugoslavia, was unable to support her financially. It was then that she found out about a course in conference interpreting at HEC in which she enrolled in 1949 and 1950.

Danica Seleskovitch had just qualified as a conference interpreter in the spring of 1950 when her father died. At the same time in Paris, the U.S. Department of State was seeking to hire French mother tongue interpreters to accompany French productivity teams to the United States as part of the Marshall Plan. The teams consisted of French business and opinion leaders from various sectors of industry and commerce, aiming to uncover the secrets of American productivity during missions lasting up to six weeks. In the spring of 1950, Danica Seleskovitch sailed to the United States, where she would remain until 1953.

Soon after returning to France, Danica Seleskovitch left Paris again for Luxemburg, where she had been offered a position as an interpreter at the European Coal and Steel Community (ECSC) set up by Jean Monnet and Paul-Henri Spaak. The ECSC had a great need for French interpreters, particularly from German. She was to stay in Luxemburg until 1955, when she returned to Paris for good and became a free-lance conference interpreter. She joined the recently formed International Association of Conference Interpreters (AIIC) in 1956 and was the Association’s executive secretary from 1959 to 1963.

No sooner had she started working as an interpreter than she also started thinking about how the process of interpreting conveys sense and, in the 1960s, started writing about it. Her first book, L’interprète dans les conférences internationales, problèmes de langage et de communication was published in 1968. Langage, langues et mémoire, étude de la prise de note en interprétation consécutive, with a preface by Jean Monnet, was based on her PhD thesis, defended in 1973, and was published in 1975. Together with Marianne Lederer, she went on to develop the theory of sense, which subsequently became known as the Interpretive Theory of Translation. In a departure from the linguistic approach, which had previously characterized translation studies, Danica Seleskovitch postulated that successful written and oral translation (interpreting) is based on an understanding of the message in the source language and the restatement of that message in the target language, focusing on the sense and not simply on the words of the original, while nevertheless taking account of their register and style. This intuition, drawn from her experience as an interpreter, closely aligned with the findings of emerging psychological and cognitive studies of language, which were also beginning to explore this new territory.

From the 1980s onwards Danica Seleskovitch devoted most of her time to teaching and research in translation studies at the École supérieure d'interprètes et de traducteurs (ESIT), Université Paris III - Sorbonne Nouvelle.

Seleskovitch received an Honorary Doctorate from Heriot-Watt University in 1985

Throughout her career as a teacher and researcher, she inspired many students all over the world. They continue her work, building on her legacy.

Danica Seleskovitch died in Cahors (France) on April 17, 2001, in her 80th year.

== The Danica Seleskovitch Prize ==
In 1991, former students, friends and colleagues of Danica Seleskovitch founded “The Association for the Danica Seleskovitch Prize”, renamed the “Danica Seleskovitch Association” in 2011. The purpose of the Association, as defined in Article 2 of its Statutes, is “to carry forward the work of Danica Seleskovitch by awarding the Danica Seleskovitch Prize to a professional conference interpreter or translation scholar in recognition of their outstanding service to the interpreting profession or their original research in translation studies”. The Danica Seleskovitch prize is awarded by the Association, usually every two years, acting on a recommendation from an eight-member jury.

The winners of the Danica Seleskovitch Prize since its inception are:

Year	Prizewinner
1992	Walter Keiser
1994	Philippe Séro-Guillaume
1996	Gérard Ilg
1999	Jungwha Sohee Choi
2002	Marianne Lederer
2005	Jennifer Mackintosh and Christopher Thiéry
2007	Renée Van Hoof-Haferkamp
2009	Miriam Shlesinger
2012	Ingrid Kurz
2014	Christiane Driesen
2016	Myriam de Beaulieu
2018	Luigi Luccarelli
2020	Barbara Moser-Mercer
2023	Ivana Čeňková

== Publications ==
=== Books ===
- 1968 L’interprète dans les conférences internationales, problèmes de langage et de communication, Paris, Minard Lettres Modernes, 262 p., 2ème édition 1983. Translated into English as Interpreting for International Conferences. 2nd revised edition, Washington D.C, Pen ad Booth, 1994. Also translated into German, Chinese, Korean, Japanese and Serbian.
- 1975 Langage, Langues et mémoire, étude de la prise de notes en interprétation consécutive, (preface by Jean Monnet), Paris, Minard Lettres Modernes, Paris, 273 p.
- 1984 Interpréter pour traduire, with Lederer Marianne, Didier Erudition, Paris, 312 p, 4° édition, 2001. Translated into Arabic, Chinese, Georgian.
- 1989 Pédagogie raisonnée de l’interprétation, with Lederer Marianne. co-published by the Office of Official Publications of the European Communities and Didier Erudition, Luxembourg-Paris, 282 p. 2ème édition revue et augmentée, 2002. Translated into English by Jacolyn Harmer as A systematic approach to teaching interpretation, Registry of Interpreters for the Deaf, 1995, 235 p. Library of Congress Catalog Card Number 95-069311. Also translated into Chinese and Serbian.

=== Main articles ===
- 1974 "Zur Theorie des Dolmetschens", in Kapp V. (ed.), Übersetzer und Dolmetscher, Heidelberg, Quelle und Meyer, 2ème édition 1983, pp. 37–49.
- 1976 "Interpretation, a Psychological Approach to Translation", in Brislin R.W. (ed) Translation: Applications and Research, New York, Gardner Press, pp. 92–116.
- 1976 "Traduire, de l’expérience aux concepts", Etudes de Linguistique Appliquée (ELA), N° 24, Paris, Didier., pp. 64–91. Translated into English and Spanish.
- 1977 "Take care of the sense and the sounds will take care of themselves or Why Interpreting is not tantamount to Translating Languages", The Incorporated Linguist, London, Vol. 16, pp. 27–33.
- 1978 "Language and Cognition", in Gerver David and Sinaiko H.Wallace (eds.), Language Interpretation and Communication, New York, Plenum Press, pp. 333–342.
- 1980 "Pour une théorie de la traduction inspirée de sa pratique", Montréal, META, Vol. 25, n° 4, Presses de l’Université de Montréal, pp. 401–408.
- 1981 "Recherche universitaire et théorie interprétative de la traduction", Montréal, META, Vol. 26, n° 3, Presses de l’Université de Montréal, pp. 304–308.
- 1982 "Impromptu Speech and Oral Translation", in Enkvist N.E. (ed.), Impromptu Speech: A symposium, Abo, Research Institute of the Abo Akademi Foundation, p. 241-254.
- 1982 "Traduction et comparatisme", in Contrastes (hors-série A1), Paris, pp. 15–29.
- 1982 "La compréhension d’une pensée à travers son expression", Multilingua, Amsterdam, Mouton, 1.1.1982, pp. 33–41.
- 1985 "Interprétation ou interprétariat", META, Vol.30, n°1, Montréal, Presses de l’Université de Montréal, pp. 19–24.
- 1985 "Les notions de signifiant/signifié, de concept et de sens en interprétation" in Bühler H. (ed.), Actes du 10ème Congrès Mondial de la FIT, Vienne, Wilhelm Braumüller, pp. 178–186.
- 1985 "De la possibilité de traduire", Conférence plénière, Actes du Congrès 1984 de l’Association Internationale de Linguistique Appliquée (AILA) Vol.V., pp. 1781–1796.
- 1986 "Translation: Corresponding Words or Equivalent Texts?" in TexTconText, Heidelberg, Julius Groos Verlag, pp. 128–140.
- 1987 "Traduction et créativité" in Etudes de lexicologie, lexicographie et stylistique offertes en hommage à Georges Matoré, Paris, Publications de la Sorbonne, pp. 263–276.. Translated into Hungarian.
- 1987 "Context-free Language and Sense in Translation", in Lörscher Wolfgang and Schulze Rainer (eds.), Perspectives on Language in Performance, Gunter Narr Verlag, Tübingen, pp. 441–446.
- 1987 "La traduction interprétative" in Palimpsestes n° 1, Paris, Publication de la Sorbonne Nouvelle, pp. 41–50.
- 1988 "Quelques phénomènes langagiers vus à travers l’interprétation simultanée", in Hommage à Bernard Pottier, Paris, Klincksiek, pp. 709–717.
- 1990 "Quelques réflexions sur la traductologie française (1975-1986)", Les Sciences du langage en France au XXème siècle, supplément, SELAF, Paris, pp. 479–489.
- 1990 "La traduction des hypéronymes et autres termes de grande extension", META, Vol. 5, Montréal, Presses de l’Université de Montréal, pp. 91–95.
- 1991 "Fundamentals of the Interpretive Theory of Translation" in Expanding Horizons, J. Plant-Moeller (ed.), Washington D.C., RID, pp. 1–13.
- 1991 "De la pratique de l'interprétation à la traductologie", in Lederer Marianne et Israël Fortunato (eds) La liberté en traduction, Paris, Didier Erudition, pp. 289–299.
- 1992 "Von der Praxis zur Theorie", in Salevsky Heidemarie. (ed,) Wissenschaftliche Grundlagen der Sprachmittlung, Frankfurt/Main, Peter Lang, pp. 38–54.
- 1995 "Interpretation and Verbal Communication", in Übersetzungswissenchaft im Umbruch, Tübingen, Günter Narr Verlag, pp. 301 à 306.
- 1998 "Le dilemme terminologique de la retraduction", in Traduire n° 175 - 1/98, pp. 17–28.
- 1999 "The Teaching of Conference Interpretation in the Course of the Last 50 Years", in B.Moser-Mercer (ed.), Interpreting Vol. 4 (1/2), John Benjamins Publishing Co., pp. 55–66.
- 2004 "The Practice and Theory of Consecutive and Simultaneous Interpretation", in An International Encyclopaedia of Translation Studies, Vol.I, Berlin, New York, Walter de Gruyter, pp. 779–789.

== Bibliography ==
- Études traductologiques : en hommage à Danica Seleskovitch, edited by Marianne Lederer, Lettres modernes, 1990.
- Fortunato Israël et Marianne Lederer (eds) La Théorie Interprétative de la Traduction (Vol. I: genèse et développement, Vol.II. convergences, mises en perspectives, Vol.III. de la formation ... à la pratique professionnelle), lettres modernes minard, 2005.
