= Anna Furtado =

American writer

Anna Furtado is an American author of The Briarcrest Chronicles and other lesbian fiction. The Heart’s Desire – Book One of The Briarcrest Chronicles was a finalist for the Golden Crown Literary Society Award ("Goldie") in the romance category. The second novel in the Briarcrest series is titled The Heart’s Strength. The final installment of the Chronicles is titled "The Heart's Longing". It, too, has the distinction of reaching the finalist category for a "Goldie" in the year following publication. Anna's non-fiction credits have included a bi-monthly column on the art and craft of writing at Just About Write (www.justaboutwrite.com), where she reviews of lesbian fiction by colleagues. She has also written pet care articles for Pet Food Express on the Web. She lives with her partner of more than 25 years in the San Francisco Bay Area.

Her novels include a mystery-romance, Incident at Elder Creek and Tremble and Burn, the romance about a medical doctor and a portrait photographer set in San Francisco around the time of the 1906 earthquake.

== Awards ==
"The Heart's Longing" Finalist - Golden Crown Literary Award ("Goldie")

"The Heart's Desire" Finalist - Golden Crown Literary Award ("Goldie")

24-Hour Short Story Award ("Reality Check")- First Place (2000)

== Published works: fiction ==
- Reality Check (short story)
- The Heart's Desire - Book One of The Briarcrest Chronicles (Regal Crest 2004)
- The Heart's Strength - Book Two of The Briarcrest Chronicles (Regal Crest 2007)
- The Heart's Longing - Book Three of The Briarcrest Chronicles (Regal Crest 2009)
- Incident at Elder Creek (Regal Crest 2016)
- Tremble and Burn (Regal Crest 2017)
