= Renée Van Hoof-Haferkamp =

European politician (1928–2025)

Renée Van Hoof-Haferkamp (born 19 November 1928 in Cologne, died 20 March 2025) was the first Director-General of the European Commission's interpretation service, DG SCIC. She started her career as personal assistant to Paul-Henri Spaak, the first President of the Common Assembly of the first precursor of the European Union, the European Coal and Steel Community (ECSC).

Van Hoof-Haferkamp then set up the ECSC's interpretation service. In 1982, she became director-general of DG SCIC and the first female director-general in the European Commission, and the only one until 1990.
