= Marie De Cotteblanche =

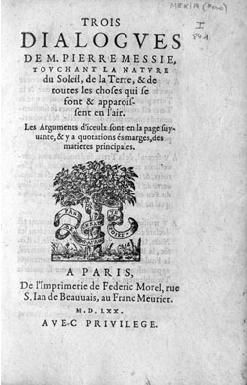
Title page Three Dialogues of Pierre Messie, concerning the nature of the Sun, Earth, & all things that have appeared in the air. Printed in Paris by Federic Morel, 1570. Translator: Marie De Cotteblanche

Marie De Cotteblanche (born ca. 1520, Paris - died before 1584, probably Paris) was a French noblewoman known for her skill in languages and translation of works from Spanish to French.

She was daughter of Guy De Cotteblanche, a lawyer for the Parlement of Paris. Her mother was Catherine Hesseline whom he married in 1517. She had an older brother Elie, who became a Gentleman of the Royal Chamber in 1571, and a sister Marguerite. The poet François de Belleforest dedicated a poem to the family in 1560 called Chasse d'amour. There are indications the family were French Protestants. Marie de Cotteblanche studied languages, philosophy, science, and mathematics. Her praises were sung by the bibliographer Le Croix de Maine. Her patron was Marguerite de Saluces, the Marachale de Termes who taught her Italian.

Her only known surviving work is her 1566 translation of a best-selling text, Coloquios y Diálogos (1547) by the Spanish encyclopaedist Pedro Mexía. The French title was Trois dialogues de M. Pierre Messie, touchant la nature du soleil, de la terre et de toutes les choses qui se font et apparaissent en l'air (Three Dialogues … on the Sun and the Earth). Its dialog form appealed to a wide readership and it was reprinted 29 times between 1566 and 1643.
