= María Eugenia Hurtado Azpeitia =

Mexican architect

- Occupation: Architect

María Eugenia Hurtado Azpeitia is a Mexican architect. She is the coordinator of the Carlos Leduc M. Workstop of the Faculty of Architecture at the National Autonomous University of Mexico.

== Biography ==
María Eugenia Hurtado Azpeitia graduated from the National Autonomous University of Mexico with a Bachelor's and later Master's degree. She began her career in the last year of her university education in the field of landscape architecture on a road and alpine lodge being constructed in Ajusco. After finishing her degree, Azpeitia was invited by architect Carlos González Lobo to work at Espacio Máximo Costo Mínimo.

On 27 December 2011, Azpeitia and Lobo were both presented with the Vassilis Sgoutas Prize by the International Union of Architects in recognition of the work of Lobo's team in designing and building homes for the impoverished. They were again awarded in 2013 by the Castilla y Leon chapter of Architects Without Borders with the Magdalena de Plata Award.

== Bibliography ==
- Lobo, Carlos González; Azpeitia, María Eugenia Hurtado (28 March 2010). "Transferencia y capacitación en tecnologías: Un material posible para las viviendas con motivo de la emergencia en Haití, 2010" [Transfer and training in technologies: A possible material for housing due to the emergency in Haiti, 2010] (PDF). Dearquitectura (in Spanish). University of the Andes Colombia.
