= Gaspar Hurtado =

Spanish Jesuit theologian

Gaspar Hurtado (Mondéjar, Guadalajara, Spain, 1575 – Alcalá de Henares, 5 August 1647) was a Spanish Jesuit theologian.

== Life ==
He studied at the University of Alcalá de Henares, where in the examination for the doctorate he won the highest place from numerous competitors. He was at once appointed professor in the university, and was winning fame as a lecturer, when at the age of 32, he resigned his chair and entered the Society of Jesus (1607).

His talents lying mostly in the direction of theology, he lectured on this subject successively at Murcia, Madrid, and Alcalá. He was an orator and preacher with abundant success before the Spanish court.

He died in 1647 as dean of the faculty at Alcalá, where he had professed for thirty years.

== Works ==
His principal works are:

- De Eucharistia, sacrificio missæ et ordine (Alcalá, 1620)
- De matrimonio et censuris (Alcalá, 1627)
- De Incarnatione Verbi (Alcalá, 1628)
- De Sacramentis in genere et in specie, i. e, Baptismo, Confirmatione, Poenitentia, et Extrema Unctione (Alcalá, 1628)
- De beatitudine, de actibus humanis, bonitate et malitia, habitatibus, virtutibus et peccatis (Madrid, 1632)
- Disputationes de sacrimentis et censuris (Antwerp, 1633)
- De Deo (Madrid, 1642)

He was among the earliest to deviate from the method of Thomas Aquinas, which till then had been followed by the majority of theologians, and he devised a system of his own. He is noted for the brevity, conciseness, and clearness of his exposition.
