= Netley Lucas =

English confidence trickster and writer

Netley Lucas (c. 1903 - 1940) was an English confidence trickster and writer.

Lucas was an orphan. His mother had died shortly after his birth. His alcoholic father had abandoned him. His family was wealthy: his grandparents had paid for him to attend a public school. When they died, he was left alone in the world. In 1917, aged 14, he was working as a pantryman on the passenger liner Kenilworth Castle, which sailed between London and Cape Town. While on board, he read a newspaper account of someone who had adopted a false identity. On returning to England, he adopted the persona of Gerald Chilcott, a South African midshipman whom he had met on board Kenilworth Castle while Chilcott was being invalided home. He bought the appropriate uniform, and presented himself at the King George and Queen Mary's Club, London, an institution dedicated to helping impoverished servicemen. He claimed to have fought in the Battle of Jutland (1916), and to have lost his possessions there. He was lionised by society, and opened credit accounts with restaurants, tailors and car hire companies.

He was arrested for obtaining money by false pretences. As he was a juvenile, he was sent to a reformatory. He soon escaped, began again to pose as a gentleman. At the age of 17, he had a chauffeur-driven Daimler car from Harrods, and was socialising with both duchesses and chorus girls.

Between 1917 and 1924, Lucas was taken to court five times. After 1924, the self-called "aristocrat of crooks" claimed to have become a reformed character, and turned to writing. He quipped, "journalism is the only honest profession for which a criminal life is a good training". After writing for newspapers, he wrote six books in three years, beginning with The Autobiography of a Crook, which became a bestseller.

In the summer of 1927, he was exposed for fabricating stories. His "autobiography" later turned out to have been ghost written by an author who had been paid to write a selective account.

Lucas now became associated with "Evelyn Graham", author of fraudulent biographies of members of the British and other royal families, and the newly established publisher and literary agent "Albert E. Marriott". Marriott was a pseudonym of Lucas. Journalists uncovered eight names associated with Lucas, and he was arrested, convicted, and sentenced for attempting to sell a bogus manuscript. After release from prison, he wrote the aptly-titled My Selves (1934).

Lucas died in 1940, reportedly as a result of alcoholic excess.

== Selected publications ==
- Lucas, Netley (17 December 2010) [1925]. The Autobiography of a Crook. Dial Press. ISBN 978-1240075362.
- Lucas, Netley (1934). My Selves. A. Barron. ASIN B00085ZP7A.
