= Amparo Hurtado Albir =

Amparo Hurtado Albir is a Spanish professor, translator and researcher. She has studied modern Philology at the University of Valencia. She is currently a professor of Traductology at the Autonomous University of Barcelona and is considered an essential reference for Translation Theory and for the academic formation of professionals of Language. Hurtado Albir is also the principal researcher in PACTE research group.

== Works ==
- La notion de fidélité en traduction. París, Didier Érudition (1990).
- La enseñanza de la traducción (1996). Castellón: Universitat Jaume I.
- Traducción y Traductología: Introducción a la traductología (2001). Madrid: Cátedra.
