= Not So Quiet: Stepdaughters of War =

1930 novel by Helen Zenna Smith

- First edition
- Author: Helen Zenna Smith (Evadne Price)
- Language: English
- Genre: War-fiction, feminist fiction
- Publisher: Albert E Marriott
- Publication date: 1930
- Publication place: United Kingdom
- Media type: Print
- Pages: 300
- ISBN: 0-935312-82-X
- OCLC: 18741174
- Followed by: Women of the Aftermath

Not So Quiet: Stepdaughters of War is a 1930 novel by British author Evadne Price writing under the pseudonym "Helen Zenna Smith". The book presents a stark critique of the romanticized depictions of war, targeting the traditional, gendered representations of heroism and sacrifice. It offers a detailed account of the experiences of women serving in auxiliary roles during World War I.

The narrative centers on the protagonist, named Nell Smith, and her fellow volunteer ambulance drivers (VAD) on the French front during the war. Many of these women, often originating from privileged backgrounds, are abruptly confronted with the brutal reality of war, witnessing the horrific impacts of conflict, from death and severe injuries to the constant threat of danger and harsh living conditions. The mental and emotional strain they endure, coupled with the societal expectations that compelled them to serve, lead to a sense of disillusionment that forms a significant part of the novel's thematic structure.

Not So Quiet is a part of the War Popular series that initially intended to feature six volumes, each authored by different writers and presenting unique perspectives on the war. Price was commissioned to write a satirical take on Erich Maria Remarque's acclaimed novel, All Quiet on the Western Front, from a female perspective. However, she opted to provide a sobering commentary on the atrocities of war, drawing inspiration from the real-life experiences of Winifred Young, a female ambulance driver in World War I.

Scholarly analysis of the novel has underscored its feminist themes, its exploration of class differences, and its contribution to World War I literature. By focusing on the oft-ignored experiences of women during times of war, '''Not So Quiet''' presents a compelling counter-narrative to the more romanticized or hero-centric war stories. As of the last update in 2021, it continues to be regarded as an influential work in 20th-century literature.

== Themes ==
The novel provides vivid descriptions of wounds, deformations, and death as a means to convey the vulnerability of the human body, the senselessness of war, and the reality of horror a World War I ambulance driver would face. The graphic nature of these descriptions challenges traditional gender norms associated with women and violence, questioning preconceptions about what is considered 'appropriate' for a female writer to address.

Responding to All Quiet on the Western Front, Not So Quiet: Stepdaughters of War also employs an established narrative repertoire for portraying war. Remarque's novel, much like Ernest Hemingway's A Farewell to Arms, continued to evoke powerful emotional responses from readers, more than a decade after World War I. In a similar manner, Price, along with other post-war novelists, adopted analogous narrative strategies to engage a reflective, anti-war, pro-peace readership prevalent during the late 1920s and early 1930s.

== Legacy ==
In October 1930, a theatrical adaptation of the novel made its debut at the Empire Theatre on Broadway, under the direction of Chester Erskine. The play starred Katharine Alexander in the role of a hardened and disillusioned ambulance driver, and Warren William portraying a psychologically affected officer. Despite receiving critical acclaim for its astute direction and creative stagecraft, the play achieved only moderate success. The dawn of the Great Depression likely influenced audience preference towards lighter, more escapist entertainment.

Subsequently, Price authored four sequels to Not So Quiet… using the Smith pseudonym during the period from 1931 to 1934. However, these sequels did not attain the same level of popularity as the original novel, causing the book to be perceived as "a victim of its own success".
