= List of translators =

This is primarily a list of notable translators. Large sublists have been split off to separate articles.

== By text ==
- List of Bible translators
- List of Qur'an translators
- List of Kural translators
- List of translators of William Shakespeare
- List of translations of Beowulf
- Translations of The Hobbit
- List of translations of The Lord of the Rings
- List of Harry Potter translations

== By target language ==
=== Into Afrikaans ===
- Kobus Geldenhuys – translator of children's literature including works by Cressida Cowell, J. K. Rowling, C. S. Lewis, Roald Dahl, Michael Morpurgo and David Walliams
- Uys Krige – translator of Latin American poetry by Vicente Huidobro, Jorge Carrera Andrade, Nicolas Guillen, Cesar Vallejo, Jorge de Lima and Manuel Bandeira
- Elizabeth Weber – translator of children's literature including Black Beauty by Anna Sewell and Robinson Crusoe by Daniel Defoe among others
- Reza de Wet – translator of the play Three Sisters by Anton Chekhov

=== Into Albanian ===
- Mirela Kumbaro
- Vangjel Meksi – translated the first version of the Bible into Albanian
- Fan Noli – translator of world literature
- Robert Shvarc – translator of works by Bertolt Brecht, Lion Feuchtwanger, Gabriel García Márquez and Erich Maria Remarque among others
- Petro Zheji – translator of works by Miguel Ángel Asturias, Denis Diderot, Ivan Goncharov and John Steinbeck among others

=== Into Arabic ===
- Ibn al-Muqaffa' – translator of Porphyry's Isagoge
- Simin Daneshvar – translator of works by Ryūnosuke Akutagawa, Anton Chekhov, Alan Paton, William Saroyan and George Bernard Shaw among others
- Rifa'a el-Tahtawi – translator from French
- Taha Hussein – translator of Sophocles and Jean Racine among others
- Hafs ibn Albar – translator of the Bible
- Hafez Ibrahim – translator of Les Misérables by Victor Hugo
- Anbara Salam Khalidi – translator of the Odyssey by Homer and Aeneid by Virgil
- Muhsin al-Ramli – translator of Don Quixote by Miguel de Cervantes
- Abdulla Haba – leading translator of Russian literature into Arabic, winner of the Sheikh Hamad Award for Translation and International Understanding

=== Into Armenian ===
- Levon Ananyan – translator of Ray Bradbury's Fahrenheit 451
- Vahagn Davtyan – translator of the works of Alexander Pushkin, Sergei Yesenin, Sándor Petőfi and Alexander Blok
- Vahan Malezian
- Hovhannes Masehian – translator of Shakespeare's of Hamlet
- Torkom Manoogian – translator of Shakespeare's sonnets
- Nahapet Rusinian – translator of Frédéric Bérat's French poem Ma Normandie
- Hamo Sahyan
- Vardges Sureniants – translator of Shakespeare's Richard III
- Alexander Tsaturian
- Rita Vorperian

=== Into Azerbaijani (Azeri) ===
- Hamlet Isaxanli (Isayev) – translator of poems from Russian, English and French
- Mirza Khazar – translator of the Bible

=== Into Bengali ===
- Kabir Chowdhury
- Alokeranjan Dasgupta – translator of literature from German and French
- Zohurul Hoque – translator of the Qu'ran
- Hana Catherine Mullens – translator of Charlotte Maria Tucker's Daybreak in Britain
- Hana Preinhaelterová – translator from Czech
- Girish Chandra Sen – translator of the Qu'ran
- Jyotirindranath Tagore

=== Into Bulgarian ===
- Albena Bakratcheva – translator of works by Patricia Highsmith, Ralph Waldo Emerson, Wole Soyinka and Henry David Thoreau
- Valeri Petrov – translator of Shakespeare's Comedies
- Nikolai B. Popov – translator of poetry by Paul Celan

=== Into Catalan ===
- Xenia Dyakonova – translator of works from Russian
- Mikel de Epalza – translator of the Qu'ran
- Quim Monzó – translator of works by Ray Bradbury, Truman Capote, Roald Dahl, Harvey Fierstein, Arthur Miller and Mary Shelley among others

=== Into Chichewa/Chinyanja ===
- Benedicto Wokomaatani Malunga – translator of Things Fall Apart by Chinua Achebe

=== Into Chinese ===
- Lucy Chao – translator of The Waste Land by T. S. Eliot, The Song of Hiawatha by Henry Wadsworth Longfellow and Leaves of Grass by Walt Whitman
- Chen Liangting – translator of The Chronicles of Narnia by C. S. Lewis, The Maltese Falcon by Dashiell Hammett and Gone with the Wind by Margaret Mitchell
- Lucifer Chu – translator of fantasy novels including the Dragonlance Chronicle by Margaret Weis and The Hobbit and The Lord of the Rings trilogy by J. R. R. Tolkien
- Fu Lei – translator of works by Honoré de Balzac, Romain Rolland, Bertrand Russell and Voltaire
- Huang Ai – translator of Oliver Twist by Charles Dickens
- Jiang Feng – translator of poetry works by Emily Dickinson and Percy Bysshe Shelley; winner of the Lu Xun Literary Prize
- Ma Zhencheng – translator of works by Michel de Montaigne, Milan Kundera, André Gide, Antoine de Saint-Exupéry and Marguerite Duras
- Mei Yi – translator of How the Steel Was Tempered by Nikolai Ostrovsky
- Ren Rongrong – translator of Italian fairy tales and children's literature
- Song Zhaolin – translator of Jane Eyre by Charlotte Brontë and A Tale of Two Cities and David Copperfield by Charles Dickens
- Sun Zhili – translator of works by Jane Austen and Ernest Hemingway
- Wang Chong
- Wang Weike – translator of Dante's Divina Commedia (rendered indirectly from French)
- Wen Jieruo – translator from English and Japanese
- Xiang Xingyao – translator of the works of the Russian writer Alexander Herzen
- Yang Jingyuan – translator of works by Charlotte Brontë and Emily Brontë
- Yu Hsi – translator of the Kural
- Zi Zhongyun – translator of Civil Servant by Honoré de Balzac, Philosophy by Alain de Botton, Oh, the Pioneer and The Bohemia Girl by Willa Cather and The Bridges of Madison County by Robert James Waller

=== Into Comanche ===
- Tomassa

=== Into Croatian ===
- Krešimir Ćosić – translator of the Book of Mormon and Doctrine and Covenants
- Zlatko Crnković – translator of literature from German, English, Russian and French
- Antun Dalmatin – translator of Protestant liturgical books
- Stefan Geosits – translator of the Bible
- Nada Klaić – translator from Latin
- Željka Markić – translator of works by Roy Gutman and John Grisham
- Mandali Mendrilla – translator of the Hindu epics from Sanskrit

=== Into Czech ===
- Jaroslava Moserová – translator of over forty books by Dick Francis
- Anna Řeháková – translator of German women's novels
- Kamil V. Zvelebil – translator of the Kural and other ancient Tamil works
- Zora Wolfová – translator of works by Charles Darwin, Arthur Conan Doyle, Nora Ephron, Martha Grimes, Doris Lessing, Alan Marshall, Vance Palmer, Cyril Northcote Parkinson, Ellis Peters, Katharine Susannah Prichard, Arthur Ransome and Margaret Yorke among others

=== Into Danish ===
- Solvej Balle – translator of Rosmarie Waldrop's The Reproduction of Profiles
- Ida Nyrop Ludvigsen – translator of J. R. R. Tolkien's books
- Daisy Schjelderup – translator of Herman Melville's Moby Dick, Virginia Woolf's A Room of One’s Own, Mario Puzo's The Godfather, Emily Brontë's Wuthering Heights, and Roald Dahl's Kiss Kiss

=== Into Dutch ===
- Kader Abdolah – translator of the Qu'ran
- Anneke Brassinga – translator of works by George Orwell, Oscar Wilde, Vladimir Nabokov, Samuel Beckett, Sylvia Plath, Patricia Highsmith, W.H. Auden, Hermann Broch, Jean Jacques Rousseau, Marcel Proust and Jules Verne
- Daniël de Clercq – translator of Eduard Baltzer
- Estella Hijmans-Hertzveld – translator of Ludwig Philippson's oratio Mose auf Nebo, Grace Aguilar's Sabbath Thoughts and Sacred Communings and a series of Norwegian articles by Henrik Wergeland
- Caroline van der Hucht-Kerkhoven – translator of Anna Kingsford and Eduard Baltzer
- Max Schuchart – translator of English novels by Daniel Defoe, Terry Goodkind, William Horwood and Salman Rushdie among others

=== Into English ===
- List of translators into English

=== Into Esperanto ===
- Muztar Abbasi – translator of the Qu'ran
- Ujaku Akita – translator of Japanese works by Junko Sibata and Haĵime Ŝuzui
- Nadija Hordijenko Andrianova – translator of Ukrainian works by Taras Shevchenko, Ivan Franko, Lesya Ukrainka, Maksym Rylsky, Oles Honchar, Ivan Drach and Yevhen Hutsalo
- William Auld – translator of English works by Edward Fitzgerald, Christopher Fry, Harry Harrison, Jack London, J. R. R. Tolkien, and Oscar Wilde amongst others
- Gerrit Berveling – translator of the Book of Numbers
- Louise Briggs – translator of William Shakespeare's works and children's songs
- Hendrik Bulthuis – translator of Les Deux Billets by Jean-Pierre Claris de Florian, The Lion of Flanders by Hendrik Conscience and Jane Eyre by Charlotte Brontë among others
- Rosa Junck – translator of La Floro De L' Pasinto (1906) and Kverko kaj Floro (1906) by Edmondo De Amicis
- Carlo Minnaja – translator of The Mistress of the Inn by Carlo Goldoni and the poems of Cesare Pavese
- Louisa Frederica Adela Schafer – translator of English hymns
- Jenny Weleminsky – translator of works by Franz Grillparzer, Anastasius Grün and Alexander Roda Roda
- L. L. Zamenhof – creator of Esperanto and translator of the Hebrew Bible (known to Christians as the Old Testament)

=== Into Estonian ===
- Viiu Härm – translator of Latvian poetry
- Anton thor Helle – translator of the Bible
- Doris Kareva – translator of works by Anna Akhmatova, W. H. Auden, and Samuel Beckett, Joseph Brodsky, Emily Dickinson, Kahlil Gibran, Kabir and Shakespeare
- Anne Lill – translator of classic works by Apuleius, Aristophanes, Aristotle and Euripides and of philosophical works by Sigmund Freud, Friedrich Nietzsche and Leonid Stolovich.
- Minni Nurme – translator from English and Finnish
- Ants Oras – translator of works by Alexander Pope, Alexander Pushkin, Shakespeare and Virgil
- Ly Seppel – translator of a selection of stories from One Thousand and One Nights and of song lyrics from Turkic languages, Russian and Finnish
- Enn Soosaar – translator of works by Ernest Hemingway, William Faulkner and Saul Bellow
- Haljand Udam – translator of Omar Khayyam's Rubaiyat and works by Rudaki, Saadi and Ibn Tufail

=== Into Faroese ===
- Heðin Brú – translator of works by Emily Brontë, Anton Pavlovich Chekhov, Henrik Ibsen and Astrid Lindgren among others
- Jákup Dahl – translator of the Bible
- Hanus Kamban – translator of ancient Greek writer Longos

=== Into Fijian ===
- Paul Geraghty – translator of the Kural
- Mary Ann Lyth – missionary, translator, teacher

=== Into Finnish ===
- Pentti Aalto – translator of the Kural
- Jaakko Hämeen-Anttila – translator of the Qu'ran
- Wilhelmiina Arpiainen
- Kersti Juva – translator of The Lord of the Rings by J. R. R. Tolkien trilogy and The Life and Opinions of Tristram Shandy, Gentleman by Laurence Sterne
- Jaana Kapari-Jatta – translator of works by Roald Dahl, Edgar Allan Poe, J. K. Rowling and Oscar Wilde
- Eeva-Liisa Manner – translator of works by Lewis Carroll, Hermann Hesse, and Franz Kafka
- Sampsa Peltonen – translator from Arabic and French
- Eila Pennanen
- Tyyni Tuulio – translator of works by Louisa May Alcott, Charlotte Brontë and Fredrika Runeberg

=== Into French ===
- List of translators into French

==== Into Anglo-Norman French ====
- Marie de France – translator of Aesop's Fables from Middle English

=== Into Galician ===
- Fátima Rodríguez

=== Into German ===
- Ilse Barea-Kulcsar – translator, journalist and communist activist
- Zoë Beck – translator of several works by Pippa Goldschmidt and others, as well as popular television series
- August Friedrich Caemmerer – translator of the Kural
- Margaret Carroux – translator of Leopold Trepper and J. R. R. Tolkien
- Svetlana Geier – translator of works by Tolstoy, Bulgakov and Solzhenitsyn from Russian
- Luise Gottsched – translator of The Spectator (9 volumes, 1739–1743), Rape of the Lock by Alexander Pope and other English and French works
- Karl Graul – translator of the Kural
- Markus Hediger – translator of the novels of Swiss writer Alice Rivaz and the poems of Nicolas Bouvier
- Annemarie Horschitz-Horst – translator of Ernest Hemingway
- Henny Koch – first translator of Adventures of Huckleberry Finn by Mark Twain in 1890
- Wolfgang Krege – translator of A Clockwork Orange by Anthony Burgess and works by Amélie Nothomb
- Elisabeth of Lorraine-Vaudémont – medieval translator of four French romances (chansons de geste) by Odo Arpin of Bourges, Sibille, Loher & Maller and Hug Chapler
- Cläre Mjøen – translator of Knut Hamsun's travel writing and short stories, along with works by other Nordic writers
- Friedrich Rückert – translator of the Kural
- August Wilhelm Schlegel – translator of Shakespeare
- Eleanor of Scotland – medieval translator of The History of the King's Son of Galicia, named Pontus, and the beautiful Sydonia (Pontus and Sidonia) from French
- Hilde Spiel – translator of works by William Macneile Dixon, Edna O'Brien and Tom Stoppard among others
- Dorothea Tieck – translator of Shakespeare
- Johann Heinrich Voss – translator of classical poetry

=== Into Greek ===
- Demetris Th. Gotsis – translator of poetry by Ingeborg Bachmann, Johannes Bobrowski, Stefan George, Friedrich Hölderlin, Sarah Kirsch, Rainer Maria Rilke and Nelly Sachs among others
- Nana Isaia – translator of works by Susan Sontag, Sylvia Plath, T. S. Eliot, Hermann Hesse and Thomas Mann
- Theofylaktos Papakonstantinou – translator of works by Karl Marx, Sigmund Freud, Charles Gide and Sidney Hook among others
- Dimitrios Triantafyllidis – translator of Russian literature, founder of the literary almanac "Στέπα"

=== Into Gujarati ===
- Anila Dalal – translator of works by Hem Barua, Buddhadeb Bosu, Mahasweta Devi, Sunil Gangopadhyay, Bimal Kar and Rama Mehta
- Bhogilal Gandhi – translator from English and Bengali
- Kantilal L. Kalani – translator of the Kural
- P. C. Kokila – translator of the Kural
- Jaya Mehta – translator of Ernest Hemingway's The Old Man and the Sea
- Tridip Suhrud – translator of G. N. Devy and biographies
- J. V. S. Taylor – translator of the Bible
- Uttamlal Trivedi – translator of Gita Rahasya by Lokmanya Tilak
- Kamal Vora – translator of world poetry

=== Into Hawaiian ===
- John Mahiʻai Kāneakua – translator of the Book of Mormon
- R. Keao NeSmith – translator of children's literature including the Harry Potter series by J. K. Rowling, The Little Prince by Antoine de Saint-Exupéry and Alice's Adventures in Wonderland by Lewis Carroll among others

=== Into Hebrew ===
- Yehuda Alharizi – translator of Maimonides' Guide for the Perplexed and Arabic maqama poetry
- Gili Bar-Hillel – translator of children's literature by Jacqueline Wilson, Diana Wynne Jones and Noel Streatfeild among others
- Cabret – translator from Latin at the end of 14th century
- T. Carmi – translator of Shakespeare
- Abraham bar Hiyya Ha-Nasi – translator of scientific works from Arabic into Hebrew (for further translation into Latin by Plato of Tivoli)
- Ibn Tibbon family – translator of Greek, Roman, Arab, and Jewish works from Arabic
- Emperor D. Pedro II – translator of poetry by Luís de Camões from Portuguese
- Abraham Regelson – translator of literature from English and Yiddish
- Yitzhak Salkinsohn – 19th century translator of John Milton and Shakespeare
- Rachel Shapira – translator of songs, such as Don McLean's "Genesis", sung by Gali Atari, Julie Gold's "From a Distance", sung by Ruhama Raz, and Sting's "Fields of Gold", sung by Dorit Farkash
- Abraham Shlonsky – translator of Shakespeare, Nikolai Gogol, and others
- Adin Steinsaltz – translator of dozens of volumes of Talmud from Aramaic
- Shaul Tchernichovsky – prolific literary translator
- Safrira Zachai – film dubbing director and translator

=== Into Hindi ===
- Pratibha Agrawal – translator of An Enemy of the People by Henrik Ibsen, Shesh Raksha by Rabindranath Tagore, Ebang Indrajit by Badal Sircar and Tin ki Talwar by Utpal Dutt
- Harihara Balasubramaniam – translator of Tolkaappiyam and the poems of Subramania Bharati
- Manjari Joshi – translator from Russian
- Vishnu Khare – translator from European and Asian languages
- Uday Prakash
- Rahul Rajesh – translator of poems by Ankur Betageri
- Bhisham Sahni – translator Lev Tolstoy’s short stories and his novel Resurrection
- Raghuvir Sahay
- Madhavrao Sapre – translator of works by Samarth Ramdas, Bal Gangadhar Tilak and Chintaman Vinayak Vaidya
- Ashok Vajpeyi – translator of Polish poetry by Czesław Miłosz and Wislawa Szymborska among others
- Ganga Prasad Vimal
- Rajendra Yadav – translator of The Outsider by Albert Camus and A Hero of Our Times by Mikhail Lermontov among others

=== Into Hungarian ===
- Ágnes Gergely – translator of English and American literature

=== Into Icelandic ===
- Guðbrandur Þorláksson – translator of the Bible
- Ólafía Jóhannsdóttir – translator of textbooks
- Agnete Loth – translator of Old Norse-Icelandic texts
- Geir T. Zoëga – translator of English and Old Icelandic dictionaries

=== Into Interlingua ===
- Alexander Gode – translator of scientific and medical literature

=== Into Italian ===
- Italo Calvino – translator of Raymond Queneau's Les fleurs bleues (The Blue Flowers)
- Ettore Capriolo – translator of McLuhan, Camus, Salman Rushdie
- Eduardo De Filippo – translator of Shakespeare's The Tempest into 18th century Neapolitan
- Vincenzo Mantovani – translator of works by William Faulkner, Henry Miller, Philip Roth, Salman Rushdie, Saul Bellow, Malcolm Lowry, Charles Bukowski, Isaac Asimov, Richard Ford, William Gaddis, John Updike, Norman Mailer, Bernard Malamud, Jerzy Kosinski and others
- Grazyna Miller – translator of Pope John Paul II's Roman Triptych: Meditations from Polish
- Cesare Pavese – translator of Herman Melville, Charles Dickens and others
- Hamza Roberto Piccardo – translator of the Qu'ran
- Fernanda Pivano – translator of works by Gregory Corso, Ernest Hemingway, Francis Scott Fitzgerald, William Faulkner, Lawrence Ferlinghetti, Allen Ginsberg, Edgar Lee Masters and Thornton Wilder among other English-language authors
- Anita Raja – translator of works by Christa Wolf, Franz Kafka and others
- Vittoria Alliata di Villafranca – translator of Tolkien
- Elio Vittorini – translator of works by Ernest Hemingway, William Saroyan, John Steinbeck, Erskine Caldwell, William Faulkner, D. H. Lawrence and Edgar Allan Poe

=== Into Japanese ===
- Shuzo Matsunaga – translator of the Kural
- Ogai Mori – translator of Goethe and Andersen from German
- Haruki Murakami – translator of Raymond Chandler
- Maruya Saiichi – translator of James Joyce
- Takanobu Takahashi – translator of the Kural
- Yukika Sohma – the first female qualified in simultaneous translation in Japanese history

=== Into Juhuri ===
- Sergey Izgiyaev – translator of the libretto of Uzeyir Hajibeyov's opera Layla and Majnun, and poems by Mikhail Lermontov, Suleyman Stalsky, Gamzat Tsadasa, Rasul Gamzatov and other poets

=== Into Kannada ===
- Sara Aboobacker – translator of novels
- L. Gundappa – translator of the Kural
- B. M. Srikanthaiah – translator of the Kural
- S. Srinivasan – translator of the Kural

=== Into Konkani ===
- Suresh Gundu Amonkar – translator of the Kural, Dhammapada, Bhagavad Gita, the Gospel of John and Dnyaneshwari
- N. Purushothama Maliaya – translator of the Kural

=== Into Latin ===
- Arcadius Avellanus – translator of popular fiction; proponent of Living Latin
- Constanzo Beschi – translator of the Kural
- Herman of Carinthia – translator of Arabic scientific texts
- Boniface Consiliarius – translator of numerous church documents from Greek
- Karl Graul – translator of the Kural
- St. Jerome – produced the Latin Vulgate version of the Bible; regarded by Christians as the patron saint of translators
- Robert of Ketton and Herman of Carinthia – rendered the Qur'an into Latin (1142–1143)
- William of Moerbeke – medieval translator of Aristotle and ancient Greek science
- John Sarrazin – medieval translator of the writings of Pseudo-Dionysius from Greek
- Plato Tiburtinus – medieval translator of the astronomical works of al-Battani, Liber Embadorum by Abraham bar Chiia, Tetrabiblos by Claudius Ptolemy and Spherics by Theodosius of Bithynia

=== Into Latvian ===
- Ieva Lešinska – translator of works by John Cornwell, Modris Eksteins, Therese Anne Fowler, Toni Morrison and Timothy D. Snyder amongst others; also translates from Latvian to English
- Mirdza Ķempe – translator of the play Mozart and Salieri by Alexander Pushkin

=== Into Lithuanian ===
- Jonas Bretkūnas – translatior of the full Luther Bible (unpublished)
- Teodoras Četrauskas – translator of works by Günter Grass, Thomas Bernhard, Franz Kafka, Elias Canetti, Siegfried Lenz, Alfred Döblin and Michael Ende
- Neringa Dangvydė – translator of works by Hélène Cixous, Gaël Faye and Éric-Emmanuel Schmitt
- Juozapas Skvireckas – translator of the Bible

=== Into Malayalam ===
- Curien Kaniamparambil – translator of the Syriac Peshitta Bible
- Vennikkulam Gopala Kurup – translator of the Kural
- G. Balakrishnan Nair – translator of the Kural
- Tiruvallam G. Bhaskaran Nair – translator of the Kural

=== Into Manx ===
- Jennifer Kewley Draskau – translator of Danish and English works
- John Phillips – translator of the Book of Common Prayer
- Brian Stowell – translator of Alice in Wonderland by Lewis Carroll

=== Into Marathi ===
- Sane Guruji – translator of the Kural

=== Into Meitei ===
- Soibam Rebika Devi – translator of the Kural

=== Into Mongolian ===
- Chosgi Odsir – translator of Buddhist poetry
- Byambyn Rinchen – translator of Karl Marx and Friedrich Engels's The Communist Manifesto
- Isaac Jacob Schmidt – translator of the Bible

=== Into Mota ===
- Elizabeth Colenso

=== Into Nepali ===
- Bhanubhakta Acharya – translator of the epic Ramayana from Sanskrit
- Laxmi Prasad Devkota – translator of William Shakespeare's play Hamlet
- Suman Pokhrel
- Abhi Subedi – translator of poems

=== Into Norwegian ===
- Nils Ivar Agøy
- Erik Gunnes – translator of the New Testament of the Bible
- Jens Matthias Pram Kaurin – translator of the Bible

=== Into Odia ===
- Shakuntala Baliarsingh – translator of the Tamil work Kaberi Bhali Jhiatie by Tripurasundari Laxmi
- Chittaranjan Das – translator of the Kural and works by Sri Aurobindo
- Gananath Das – translator of the Kural, works of Kabir Das and Guru Nanak

=== Into Oromo ===
- Mohammed Rashad Abdulle – translator of the Qu'ran
- Aster Ganno – translator of the Bible
- Onesimos Nesib – translator of the Bible

=== Into Persian ===
- Jalal Al-e-Ahmad – translator of works by Albert Camus, Jean-Paul Sartre, Fyodor Dostoyevsky and others
- Lili Golestan – translator of works by Andrew Andry, Oriana Fallaci and Christopher Frank among others
- Kourosh Safavi – translator of works by Noam Chomsky, Jostein Gaarder and Roman Jakobson among others

=== Into Polish ===
- Tadeusz Boy-Żeleński – prolific translator of French classic literature; murdered by the Nazis
- Stanisław Czerski – translator of the fables of Phaedrus
- Ignacy Krasicki – translator of Plutarch and Ossian
- Bolesław Leśmian – poet who translated the tales of Edgar Allan Poe
- Maria Skibniewska – translator of world literature, including the works of Chinua Achebe, Margaret Craven, William Faulkner, Graham Greene, Halldór Laxness, Françoise Mallet-Joris, Maria Rosseels, Flannery O'Connor, J. D. Salinger, Alan Sillitoe, Herbert George Wells and Patrick White amongst others
- Maciej Słomczyński – translator of James Joyce's Ulysses and of the complete works of Shakespeare
- Robert Stiller – prolific translator of classic and contemporary literature, from a score of languages, European as well as Oriental
- Władysław Syrokomla – translator of Latin, French, German, Russian and Ukrainian poets, including works by Pierre-Jean de Béranger, Goethe, Heinrich Heine, Mikhail Lermontov, Nikolay Nekrasov and Taras Shevchenko
- Julian Tuwim – translator of Alexander Pushkin and other Russian poets
- Adam Ważyk – translator of Alexander Pushkin's Eugene Onegin
- Aniela Zagórska – translator of the works of Joseph Conrad

=== Into Portuguese ===
- Machado de Assis translator of works by Charles Dickens, Émile de Girardin, Victor Hugo and Edgar Allan Poe
- Carlos do Amaral Freire – translator of world poetry
- Daniel Galera
- Monteiro Lobato – translator of Tarzan the Terrible by Edgar Rice Burroughs, Sorrell and Son by Warwick Deeping, Les Travailleurs de la Mer by Victor Hugo, Kim and The Jungle Book by Rudyard Kipling, Pollyanna by Eleanor H. Porter and Dear Enemy and Just Patty by Jean Webster among others
- Clarice Lispector – translator of works by Agatha Christie, Oscar Wilde, and Edgar Allan Poe.
- Décio Pignatari – translator of works by Dante, Shakespeare, Goethe and McLuhan
- Lia Wyler – translator of works by Margaret Atwood, Stephen King, Henry Miller, Joyce Carol Oates, Sylvia Plath, Gore Vidal and Tom Wolfe among others

=== Into Punjabi ===
- Tarlochan Singh Bedi – translator of the Kural
- Narinder Singh Kapoor – translator of Ivan Turgnev's Fathers and Sons and Jawaharlal Nehru's The Discovery of India
- Surjit Patar – translator of the three tragedies of Federico García Lorca, the play Nagmandala by Girish Karnad, and poems by Bertolt Brecht and Pablo Neruda among other works

=== Into Romanian ===
- Laura Poantă – translator of works by Edmondo De Amicis, David Greig, Katherine Mansfield, Saki, and Mark Twain amongst others

=== Into Russian ===
- Lidiia Alekseeva (1909–1989) – translator the works of Croatian writer Ivan Gundulić
- Ivan Bunin – translator of The Song of Hiawatha by Henry Wadsworth Longfellow
- Alexander Druzhinin – translator of several of Shakespeare's plays and the poetry of George Crabbe
- Janina Dziarnowska – translator of Polish literature
- Nora Gal – translator of the works of science fiction authors, including Isaac Asimov, Arthur C. Clarke, Roger Zelazny and Ursula K. Le Guin
- J. J. Glazov – translator of the Kural and the Cilappatikaram
- Nikolay Gnedich – made the classical translation of The Iliad
- Tatiana Gnedich – translated Lord Byron's Don Juan (from memory)
- Viktor Golyshev – translator of Light in August, One Flew Over the Cuckoo's Nest, All the King's Men, Theophilus North, 1984, Other Voices, Other Rooms, Set This House on Fire, Pulp and other books; he mostly worked on American literature
- Mikhail Lozinsky – made the classical translation of The Divine Comedy by Dante Alighieri
- Samuil Marshak – translator of Shakespeare's sonnets, among his other works
- Aleksey Mikhalyov – translator East of Eden by John Steinbeck and many other authors, as well as films and cartoons
- Midori Miura – translator of Non-chan kumo ni noru by Momoko Ishii
- Vladimir Muravyov – translator of The Great Pursuit by Tom Sharpe
- Vladimir Nabokov – translator of Alice in Wonderland and Lolita
- Boris Pasternak – translator of Faust and Shakespeare's Hamlet
- Rita Rait-Kovaleva – translator of The Catcher in the Rye by J. D. Salinger and other works, including those by William Faulkner, Franz Kafka and Heinrich Böll

=== Into Sanskrit ===
- William Carey – translator of the Bible from the original Greek and Hebrew
- Sirungathur Nadathur Sriramadesikan – translator of the Kural

=== Into Saurashtra ===
- S. S. Ram – translator of the Kural

=== Into Spanish ===
- Pilar Adón – translator from English
- Eduardo Balderas – books by leaders of the Church of Jesus Christ of Latter-day Saints (LDS Church) including A Marvelous Work and a Wonder by LeGrand Richards, The Miracle of Forgiveness by Spencer W. Kimball and Teachings of the Prophet Joseph Smith by Joseph Fielding Smith among others
- Blanche Zacharie de Baralt – translator of Rabindranath Tagore
- Jorge Luis Borges – translator of English, French and German works
- Clara Janés – translator from Eastern European languages
- Gemma Rovira Ortega – translator of The Boy in the Striped Pyjamas by John Boyne and The Kingkiller Chronicle series by Patrick Rothfuss
- Margarita Diez-Colunje y Pombo – translator from French
- Xenia Dyakonova – translator from Russian
- Javier Marías – translator of many English works
- Casiodoro de Reina – translator of the Bible
- Isabel Sabogal – translator from Polish
- Carlos Sherman – translator of Belarusian writers Jakub Kolas, Janka Kupala, Ryhor Baradulin and Vasil Bykau
- Babaji Singh – translator Guru Granth Sahib, the holy text of the Sikh religion
- Félix Torres Amat – translator of the Bible
- Abraham Usque – translator of the Hebrew Bible

=== Into Swahili ===
- Julius Nyerere – translator of Shakespeare

=== Into Swedish ===
- Catharina Burea – translator of the writings of Lutheran theologian Matthias Hafenreffer
- Carl August Hagberg – translator of Shakespeare
- Tove Jansson – translator of J. R. R. Tolkien
- Åke Ohlmarks – translator of the Icelandic Edda and works by Dante Alighieri, Nostradamus and J. R. R. Tolkien
- Sara Stridsberg – translator of the SCUM Manifesto by Valerie Solanas

=== Into Tamil ===
- Johann Phillip Fabricius – translator of the Bible
- Bhuvana Natarajan – translator from Bengali
- Virai Kaviraja Pandithar – translator of the Sanskrit literary work Saundarya Lahari
- Puviarasu – translator of The Book of Mirdad by Mikha'il Na'ima, The Brothers Karamazov by Fyodor Dostoevsky and the Shakespeare plays Hamlet, Othello and Romeo and Juliet

=== Into Thai ===
- Ann Hasseltine Judson – translator of the Gospel of Matthew
- Ngarmpun Vejjajiva – translator of Seta by Alessandro Baricco, Le moine et le philosophe by Jean-François Revel and Mathieu Ricard and The Trumpet of the Swan by E.B. White among others

=== Into Turkish ===
- Thomas Cosmades – translator of the New Testament of the Bible
- Nurduran Duman – translator of the poems of Anne Sexton, Sara Teasdale, Edna St. Vincent Millay, and Sylvia Plath, and Alma Alexander's book The Secrets of Jin-shei
- Sabahattin Eyüboğlu – translator of works by Michel de Montaigne, Jean de La Fontaine, Ivan Goncharov, William Shakespeare, Plato, Albert Camus, François Rabelais, Paul Valéry, Jean-Paul Sartre, Aristophanes, Omar Khayyám, Arthur Miller, Molière, Franz Kafka, Bertrand Russell and François-Noël Babeuf
- Sevin Okyay – translator of works by James Baldwin, Agatha Christie, Ted Hughes, H. P. Lovecraft, Edouard Roditi and J. K. Rowling, among others
- Mehmet Hakkı Suçin – translator of works by Mu'allaqat poets, Ibn Hazm, Al-Mutanabbi, Kahlil Gibran, Ali Douaji, Mahmoud Darwish, Adonis, Nizar Qabbani, Mohammed Bennis, Ghassan Kanafani, Naguib Mahfouz, Adania Shibli, Nouri Al-Jarrah, and others

=== Into Ukrainian ===
- Perepadia Anatol – translator of Gargantua and Pantagruel by François Rabelais and In Search of Lost Time by Marcel Proust
- Kateryna Mikhalitsyna – translator of works by Sylvia Plath, Alfred Szklarski, J. R. R. Tolkien and Oscar Wilde
- Oleksandr Mokrovolskyi – translator of world literature and scholarly works by Richard Adams, John Ciardi, Eoin Colfer, Wilkie Collins, Charles Dickens, Jean Bethke Elshtain, Johann Wolfgang von Goethe, Alfonso Grosso, Seamus Heaney, Justinas Marcinkevičius, Salvatore Quasimodo, Christina Rossetti, Joan Samson, Percy Bysshe Shelley, Tristan Tzara and Slavoj Žižek among others
- Oleksa Nehrebets'kyi – translator of feature films and TV series
- Iryna Shuvalova – translator of Life of Pi by Yann Martel and Milk and Honey by Rupi Kaur

=== Into Urdu ===
- Mahmud Husain – translator of the Social Contract by Jean-Jacques Rousseau and political treatise The Prince by Niccolò Machiavelli
- Ali Haider Tabatabai – translator of Elegy Written in a Country Churchyard by Thomas Gray

=== Into Vietnamese ===
- Ngô Tự Lập – translator of works by Jorge Luis Borges, Blaise Cendrars and others
- Phạm Xuân Nguyên – translator of works by Georges Bataille, Jhumpa Lahiri, Jean-François Lyotard, Haruki Murakami, Steve Parker and Oscar Zárate among others

=== Into Xhosa ===
- Henry Hare Dugmore – translator of the Bible

=== Into Zulu ===
- John Colenso – translator of the Bible

== See also ==
- Translation
- Self-translation
- List of translators into English
- List of women translators
