= List of women translators =

This is a list of women translators of literature.

== A ==
- Sara Aboobacker – translator of novels into Kannada
- Mana Aghaee (born 1973)
- Pratibha Agrawal (born 1930)
- Catharina Ahlgren (1734–c. 1800)
- Lidiia Alekseeva (1909–1989) – translated the works of Croatian writer Ivan Gundulić into Russian
- Francesca Alexander (1837–1917)
- Acija Alfirević (born 1951)
- Esther Allen (born 1962)
- Selma Ancira – winner, Read Russia Prize 2016
- Alison Anderson
- Nadija Hordijenko Andrianova (1921–1998)
- Anne Milano Appel
- Sarah Ardizzone
- Wilhelmiina Arpiainen (1859–1922)
- Sarah Austin (1793–1867)
- Oana Avasilichioaei
- Florence Ayscough (c.1878–1942)

== B ==
- Constance Bache (1846–1903)
- Michelle Bailat-Jones
- Katharine F. Baker
- Albena Bakratcheva (born 1961)
- Shakuntala Baliarsingh (born 1948)
- Solvej Balle (born 1962)
- Anna Banti (1895–1985)
- Ilse Barea-Kulcsar (1902–1973)
- Gili Bar-Hillel (born 1974)
- Polly Barton
- Zoë Beck (born 1975)
- Aphra Behn (1640–1689)
- Anthea Bell (1936–2018)
- Clara Bell (1835–1927)
- Susan Bernofsky (born 1966)
- Evangeline Wilbour Blashfield (1858–1918)
- Magda Bogin (born 1950)
- Marilyn Booth (born 1955)
- Mary Louise Booth (1831–1889)
- Antonina W. Bouis
- Lisa Rose Bradford
- Anneke Brassinga (born 1945)
- Barbara Bray (1924–2010)
- Louise Briggs (1870–1945)
- Erin Brightwell
- Dorothy Britton (1922–2015)
- Natascha Bruce
- Shelly Bryant
- Catharina Burea (1601–1678)
- Dorothy Bussy (1865–1960)

== C ==
- Jen Calleja
- Marguerite de Cambis (fl. 1550s)
- Zenobia Camprubí (1887–1956)
- Hélène Cardona
- Nancy Naomi Carlson
- Juliet Winters Carpenter
- Margaret Carroux (1912–1991)
- Lisa Carter
- Gigi Chang
- Lucy Chao (1912–1998)
- Allison M. Charette
- Anna Gustafsson Chen (born 1965)
- Chi Pang-yuan (1924–2024)
- Yukie Chiri (1903–1922)
- Rohini Chowdhury (born 1963)
- Laura Christenson
- Lyn Coffin (born 1943)
- Jessica Cohen (born 1973)
- Anne Coldefy-Faucard – winner, Read Russia Prize 2018
- Elizabeth Colenso
- Charlotte Collins (1821–1904)
- Charlotte Coombe
- Nina Cornyetz
- Margaret Jull Costa (born 1949)
- Patricia Crampton (1925–2016)
- Ineke Crezee
- Victoria Cribb
- Jennifer Croft
- Susan Curtis

== D ==
- Anne Dacier (1654–1720)
- Dai Congrong
- Anila Dalal (born 1933)
- Simin Daneshvar (1921–2012)
- Lydia Davis (born 1947)
- Sarah Death
- Katy Derbyshire
- Katrina Dodson
- Jennifer Kewley Draskau
- Adélaïde Dufrénoy (1765–1825)
- Nurduran Duman (born 1974)
- Xenia Dyakonova
- Janina Dziarnowska
- Marta Dziurosz

== E ==
- Ellen Elias-Bursac
- Karen Emmerich
- Maria Espinosa (born 1939)

== F ==
- Marcia Falk
- Jennifer Feeley
- Elaine Feinstein (1930–2019)
- Annie Finch (born 1956)
- Sheila Fischman (born 1937)
- Carolyn Forché (born 1950)
- Maureen Freely (born 1952)
- Marie de France (fl. 1160–1215)
- Shelley Frisch (born 1952)

== G ==
- Amaia Gabantxo
- Linda Gaboriau
- Ann Gagliardi
- Nora Gal (1912–1991)
- Constance Garnett (1861–1946)
- Ágnes Gergely (born 1933)
- Svetlana Geier (1923–2010)
- Sylvie Gentil (1958–2017)
- Anna Gerasimova (born 1961)
- María José Giménez
- Tatiana Gnedich
- Barbara Godard (1942–2010)
- Leah Goldberg (1911–1970)
- Lili Golestan (born 1944)
- Ann Goldstein (born 1949)
- Eleanor Goodman (born 1979)
- Luise Gottsched (1713–1762)
- Lucia Graves (born 1943)
- Edith Grossman (born 1936)
- Katia Grubisic (born 1978)
- Lady Charlotte Guest (1812–1895)

== H ==
- Marilyn Hacker (born 1942)
- Sonya Haddad (1936–2004)
- Ivana Hadži-Popović
- Hala Halim
- Geraldine Harcourt (1952–2019)
- Choman Hardi (born 1974)
- Nicky Harman
- Michelle Hartman
- Rosalind Harvey
- Celia Hawkesworth (born 1942)
- Lisa Hayden – Read Russia Prize 2016
- Matilda Hays (1820–1897)
- Hélène Henry-Safier – winner, Read Russia Prize 2012
- Mary Herbert (1561–1621)
- Rachel Hildebrandt
- Cathy Hirano
- Estella Hijmans-Hertzveld (1837–1881)
- Mary Hobson (1926–2020)
- Lakshmi Holmstrom (1935–2016)
- Anna Holmwood
- Janet Hong
- Amanda Hopkinson (born 1948)
- Caroline van der Hucht-Kerkhoven (1840–1915)
- Penny Hueston
- Sophie Hughes (born 1986)
- Anna Hume (c.1600–c.1650)
- Adriana Hunter
- Sawad Hussain

== I ==
- Jane Ingham (1897–1982)
- Nana Isaia (1934–2003)
- Anne Ishii

== J ==
- Carol Brown Janeway (1944–2015)
- Elisabeth Jaquette
- Katrine Øgaard Jensen
- Chenxin Jiang
- Ólafía Jóhannsdóttir (1863–1924)
- Constance Jones (1848–1922)
- Kira Josefsson
- Manjari Joshi (born 1960)
- Ann Hasseltine Judson (1789–1826)
- Margaret Jull Costa (born 1949)
- Rosa Junck (1850–1929), Bohemian Esperantist and translator
- Kersti Juva (born 1948)

== K ==
- Hilary Kaplan
- Jaana Kapari-Jatta (born 1955)
- Doris Kareva (born 1958)
- Ruth Ahmedzai Kemp
- Anbara Salam Khalidi (1897–1986)
- Sara Khalili
- Sora Kim-Russell
- Esther Kinsky (born 1956)
- Nada Klaić (1920–1988)
- Rachel Klein
- Patricia Klobusiczky
- Tina Kover (born 1975)

== L ==
- Jhumpa Lahiri (born 1967)
- Maria Laina (1947–2023)
- Rika Lesser (born 1953)
- Suzanne Jill Levine
- Tess Lewis
- Janet Limonard
- Sylvia Li-chun Lin
- Anne Lill (born 1946)
- Andrea Lingenfelter
- Clarice Lispector (1920–1977)
- Antonia Lloyd-Jones (born 1962)
- Agnete Loth (1921–1990)
- Julia Lovell (born 1975)
- Helen Tracy Lowe-Porter (1876–1963)
- Mary Stanley Low (1912–2007)
- Elisabeth of Lorraine-Vaudémont (c. 1395–1456)
- Ida Nyrop Ludvigsen (1927–1973)
- Jane Lumley, Baroness Lumley (1537–1587)
- Joyce Lussu (1912–1998)
- Mary Ann Lyth (1811–1890)

== M ==
- Christina MacSweeney
- Charlotte Mandell (born 1968)
- Emma Manley
- Eeva-Liisa Manner (1921–7 July 1995)
- Canan Marasligil
- Željka Markić (born 1964)
- Linda Marianello
- Farzana Marie
- Maria Mercè Marçal (1952–1998)
- Sophie Maríñez
- Ruth Martin
- Lyn Marven
- Eleanor Marx (1855–1898)
- Melanie Mauthner
- Bonnie McDougall
- Megan McDowell
- Nanette McGuinness
- Anne McLean (born 1962)
- Erica Mena
- Mandali Mendrilla (born 1976)
- Inga Michaeli
- Maria Trinidad Howard Sturgis Middlemore (1846–1890)
- Zdravka Mihaylova
- Kateryna Mikhalitsyna (born 1982)
- Grażyna Miller (1957–2009)
- Diana Mitford (1910–2003)
- Midori Miura (1947–2012)
- Cläre Mjøen (1874–1963)
- Mihaela Moscaliuc
- Jaroslava Moserová
- Erín Moure (born 1955)
- Luisetta Mudie
- Hana Catherine Mullens (1826–1861)
- Ottilie Mulzet

== N ==
- Irina Negrea (born 1952)
- Marilyn Nelson (born 1946)
- Mary Ann Newman
- Lucy North
- Sara Nović (born 1987)
- Minni Nurme (1917–1994)
- Tiina Nunnally (born 1952)

== O ==
- Patricia Oliver
- Gemma Rovira Ortega (born 1974)
- Yei Theodora Ozaki (1871–1932)

== P ==
- Helena Janina Pajzderska (1862–1927)
- Mrs H.B. Paull (1812-1888)
- Ève Paul-Margueritte (1885–1971)
- Lucie Paul-Margueritte (1886–1955)
- Charlotte Payne-Townshend (1857–1943)
- Eila Pennanen (1916–1994)
- Hana Preinhaelterová (1938–2018)
- Fernanda Pivano (1917–2009)
- Laura Poantă (born 1971)
- Agnieszka Pokojska
- Marie Ponsot (1921–2019)
- Allison Markin Powell
- Alta Price
- Minna Zallman Proctor

== Q ==
- Isabel Quigly

== R ==
- Katherine Raleigh
- Emma Ramadan
- Rita Rait-Kovaleva (1898–1988)
- Bhargavi Rao (1944–2008)
- Anna Řeháková (1850–1937)
- Nadine Ribault (1964–2021)
- Maruxa Relaño
- Famida Riaz
- Chloe Garcia Roberts
- Nancy N. Roberts (born 1957)
- Angela Rodel
- Fátima Rodríguez
- Lola Rogers
- Louise Rogers Lalaurie
- Madeleine Rolland (1872–1960)
- Margaret Roper (1505–1544)
- Olivia Rossetti Agresti (1875–1960)

== S ==
- Isabel Sabogal
- Marta Sánchez-Nieves – winner, Read Russia Prize, 2018
- Elvira Sastre (born 1992)
- Dorothy L. Sayers (1893–1957)
- Claudia Scandura – winner, Read Russia Prize 2016
- Louisa Frederica Adela Schafer (born 1865) – translated English hymns in Esperanto
- Daisy Schjelderup (1916–1991)
- Samantha Schnee
- Eleanor of Scotland (1433–1480)
- Marian Schwartz – winner, Read Russia Prize 2014
- Ros Schwartz
- Gail Scott
- Jamie Lee Searle
- Kyoko Selden (1936–2013)
- Danica Seleskovitch (1921–2001)
- Nava Semel (1954–2017)
- Ly Seppel (born 1943)
- Rachel Shapira
- Iryna Shuvalova (born 1986)
- Yvette Siegert
- Sirindhorn (born 1955)
- Maj Sjöwall (1935–2020)
- Maria Skibniewska (1904–1984)
- Rachael Small
- Nicky Smalley
- Deborah Smith (born 1987)
- Hilde Spiel (1911–1990)
- Nadejda Stancioff
- Marielle Sutherland, winner of the Stevns Translation Prize
- Louise Swanton-Belloc (1796–1881)
- Anna Swanwick (1813–1899)
- Cole Swensen (born 1955)
- Fiona Sze-Lorrain (born 1980)

== T ==
- Corine Tachtiris
- Niloufar Talebi
- Ginny Tapley Takemori
- Martha Tennent
- Anne Thompson Melo, winner of the Stevns Translation Prize
- Dorothea Tieck (1799–1841)
- Beatrix Lucia Catherine Tollemache (1840–1926)
- Tyyni Tuulio (1892–1991)
- Margaret Tyler (c.1540–c.1590)

== U ==
- Avery Fischer Udagawa

== V ==
- Louise Varèse (1890–1989)
- Maria Vega (1898–1980)
- Ngarmpun Vejjajiva (born 1962)
- Leila Vennewitz (1912–2007)
- Evangelina Vigil-Piñón (born 1949)
- Vittoria Alliata di Villafranca (born 1950)
- Laima Vince
- Saskia Vogel (born 1981)
- Larissa Volokhonsky
- Rita Vorperian

== W ==
- Martina Wachendorff
- Claire Wadie, winner of the Stevns Translation Prize
- Wangui wa Goro
- Helen Wang
- Rachel Ward
- Alyson Waters
- Laura Watkinson
- Elizabeth Weber
- Halina Weinstein
- Jenny Weleminsky (1882–1957)
- Reza de Wet (1952–2012)
- Susan Wicks (born 1947)
- Celina Wieniewska
- Marion Wiesel (1931–2025)
- Sian Williams
- Emily Wilson (born 1971)
- Natasha Wimmer (born 1973)
- Zora Wolfová (1928–2012)
- Sholeh Wolpé
- Frances Wood (born 1948)
- Barbara Wright (1915–2009)
- Lia Wyler (1934–2018)

== Y ==
- Gladys Yang (1919–1999)

== Z ==
- Safrira Zachai (born 1932)
- Aniela Zagórska (1881–1943)
- Beryl de Zoete (1879–1962)

== See also ==
- List of translators
- Women in Translation: An Interview with Margaret Carson & Alta L. Price
