= Martha Collins (poet) =

American poet (born 1940)

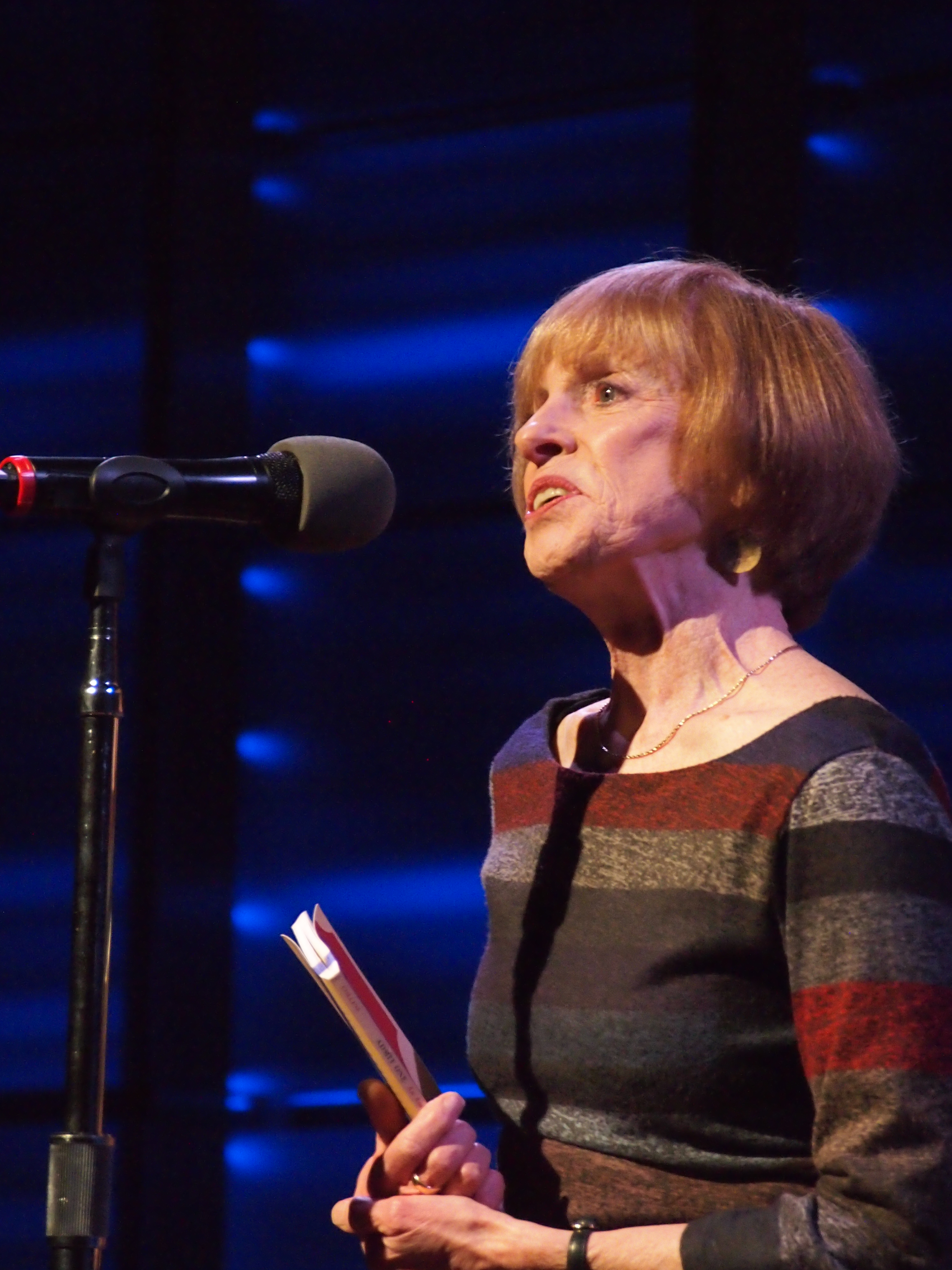
- Born: Omaha, Nebraska, U.S.
- Education: Stanford University; University of Iowa
- Occupation: Poet
- Employer(s): University of Massachusetts Boston; Oberlin College; Cornell University; Washington University in St. Louis
- Website: marthacollinspoet.com

Martha Collins (born 1940) is a poet, translator, and editor. She has published eleven books of poetry, including Casualty Reports (Pitt Poetry Series, 2022), Because What Else Could I Do (Pitt Poetry Series, 2019), Night Unto Night (Milkweed, 2018), Admit One: An American Scrapbook (Pitt Poetry Series, 2016), Day Unto Day (Milkweed, 2014), White Papers (Pitt Poetry Series, 2012), and Blue Front (Graywolf, 2006), as well as two chapbooks and five books of co-translations from the Vietnamese. She has also co-edited, with Kevin Prufer, Into English: Poems, Translations, Commentaries (Graywolf, 2017), as well as several volumes of poems by and/or essays about modern and contemporary American Poets.

== Life ==
Martha Collins was born in Omaha, Nebraska, and raised in Des Moines, Iowa. She graduated from Stanford University with a B.A., and the University of Iowa with an M.A. and a Ph.D. She taught at University of Massachusetts Boston, where she founded the Creative Writing Program in 1979; beginning in 1997, she was the Pauline Delaney Professor of Creative Writing at Oberlin College for ten years. In spring 2010, she served as Distinguished Visiting Writer at Cornell University College of Arts and Sciences, and in spring 2013 was Visiting Fannie Hurst Professor of Creative Literature in Arts and Sciences at Washington University in St. Louis. She served as editor-at-large for Field and an editor for the Oberlin College Press, and is currently a contributing editor to Consequence Magazine and Copper Nickel.

In 1993 Collins began teaching in the summer workshop of the William Joiner Institute for the Study of War and Social Consequences where she met several writers from Vietnam, including poet Nguyen Quang Thieu. The next year she studied Vietnamese, and in 1998 published her co-translations of Nguyen Quang Thieu’s poems. Since then she has published four more co-translated volumes of Vietnamese poetry.

She was a featured faculty member at the 2018 Poetry Seminar at The Frost Place in Franconia, NH, and taught poetry workshops for a number of years at the Fine Arts Work Center in Provincetown, MA. She currently teaches online workshops for the Hudson Valley Writers Center.

== Poetry ==
Known in her first few books for somewhat formal lyrical poems that occasionally referenced larger issues such as homelessness and war, Collins learned from an exhibit of lynching postcards in 2000 that the hanging her father said he had witnessed as a child was actually a lynching of an African American man, attended by 10,000 people in Cairo, Illinois. In 2005 Collins published Blue Front, a book-length poem that involved research and focused on the event, and in 2012 she explored issues of race from both personal and historical perspectives in White Papers. Her latest book, Admit One: An American Scrapbook, addresses racism, eugenics, immigration and other issues, focusing on the early twentieth-century eugenics movement.

The AWP Chronicle has described Collins as "a dazzling poet whose poetry is poised at the juncture between the lyric and ethics [and who] has addressed some of the most traumatic social issues of the twentieth century ... in supple and complex poems. Those who have followed Collins' books have long since realized that no subject is off limits for her piercing intellect."

== Awards ==
- Golden Rose Award, New England Poetry Club, 2025
- William Carlos Williams Award, Poetry Society of America, 2020
- Lannan Foundation Residency Grant, 2020
- Fellow, Women's International Study Center, 2018
- The Best American Poetry 2013
- Ohioana Poetry Award, 2013, 2007
- Visiting Artist, Siena Art Institute, 2013
- Honorary Doctoral Degree, Cleveland State University, 2008
- Anisfield-Wolf Book Award (2007) for Blue Front
- 25 Books to Remember, New York Public Library, 2006
- Laurence Goldstein Poetry Prize, Michigan Quarterly Review, 2005
- Lannan Foundation Residency Grant, 2003
- Witter Bynner / Santa Fe Art Institute Grant, 2001
- American Literary Translators Association Finalist Award, 1998
- Pushcart Prize, 1998, 1996, 1985
- Gordon Barber Memorial Award, Poetry Society of America, 1992
- National Endowment for the Arts Fellowship, 1990
- Peregrine Smith Poetry Competition for The Arrangement of Space, 1990
- Alice Fay Di Castagnola Award, Poetry Society of America, 1990
- Ingram Merrill Foundation Fellowship, 1988
- Breadloaf Fellowship, 1985
- Mary Carolyn Davies Memorial Award, Poetry Society of America, 1985
- Bunting Institute Fellowship, Radcliffe College, 1982–83
- National Endowment for the Humanities Fellowship, 1977–78

== Works ==
=== Poetry ===
- Casualty Reports (Pitt Poetry, 2022)
- Because What Else Could I Do (Pitt Poetry, 2019)
- Night Unto Night (Milkweed, 2018)
- Admit One: An American Scrapbook (Pitt Poetry, 2016)
- Day Unto Day (Milkweed, 2014)
- White Papers (Pitt Poetry, 2012)
- Sheer (Barnwood, 2008) chapbook
- Blue Front (Graywolf Press, 2006)
- Gone So Far (Barnwood, 2005) chapbook
- A History of a Small Life on a Windy Planet (University of Georgia Press,1993)
- The Arrangement of Space (Gibbs Smith, 1991)
- The Catastrophe of Rainbows (Cleveland State University, 1985)

=== Prose ===
- Word Work: Essays, Reviews, Reflections" (Tiger Bark Press, 2025)

=== Editor ===
- Wendy Battin: On the Life & Work of an Unsung Master, ed. with Charles Hartman, Pamela Alexander, and Matthew Krajniak (Gulf Coast/Pleiades/Copper Nickel, 2020)
- Jane Cooper: A Radiance of Attention, ed. with Celia Bland (Michigan, 2019)
- Ceremonial Entires: Poems by Joseph DeRoche, ed. with Kevin Gallagher (Cervena Barva, 2019)
- Into English: Poems, Translations, Commentaries, with Kevin Prufer (Graywolf, 2017)
- Catherine Breese Davis: On the Life and Work of an American Master (Pleiades Press, 2015), with Kevin Prufer and Martin Rock
- Critical Essays on Louise Bogan (G. K. Hall, 1984)

=== Translator ===
- Dreaming the Mountain: Poems by Tuệ Sỹ, co-translated with Nguyen Ba Chung (Milkweed, 2023)
- Bitter and Sweet: Poems by Trang The Hy, co-translated with Nguyen Ba Chung (Vietnam, 2015)
- Black Stars: Poems by Ngô Tự Lập, co-translated with the author (Milkweed, 2013)
- Green Rice: Poems by Lâm Thị Mỹ Dạ, co-translated with Thuy Dinh (Curbstone, 2005)
- The Women Carry River Water: Poems by Nguyen Quang Thieu, co-translated with the author (University of Massachusetts Press, 1997)

=== Anthology appearances ===
- Collins, Martha (2018). "Moving Still (excerpt)". In Melissa Tuckey (ed.). Ghost Fishing: An Eco-Justice Poetry Anthology. University of Georgia Press. p. 103. ISBN 978-0820353159.
- Collins, Martha (2003). "Lines". In Billy Collins (ed.). Poetry 180: A Turning Back to Poetry. Random House, Inc. p. 25. ISBN 978-0-8129-6887-3.
- Collins, Martha (2004). "Re:composition". In Ruth Lepson; Lynne Yamaguchi Fletcher (eds.). Poetry from Sojourner: A Feminist Anthology. University of Illinois Press. ISBN 978-0-252-07154-6.
- Collins, Martha (1984). "White Tree with Branches". In William Smart (ed.). From Mt. San Angelo: Stories, Poems & Essays. Associated University Presses. p. 64. ISBN 978-0-8453-4508-5.
- Collins, Martha (2001). "Running". In Hilda Raz (ed.). Best of Prairie Schooner: Fiction and Poetry. University of Nebraska Press. p. 180. ISBN 978-0-8032-8972-7.
- Collins, Martha (1986). Bill Henderson (ed.). The Pushcart Prize XI: Best of the Small Presses. Pushcart Press. ISBN 978-0-916366-39-1.
- Bill Henderson, ed. (1996). Pushcart Prize: Best of the Small Presses (Pushcart Press, 1996)
- Bill Henderson, ed. (1998). Pushcart Prize: Best of the Small Presses (Pushcart Press, 1998)
