= Hemant Joshi =

Indian professor

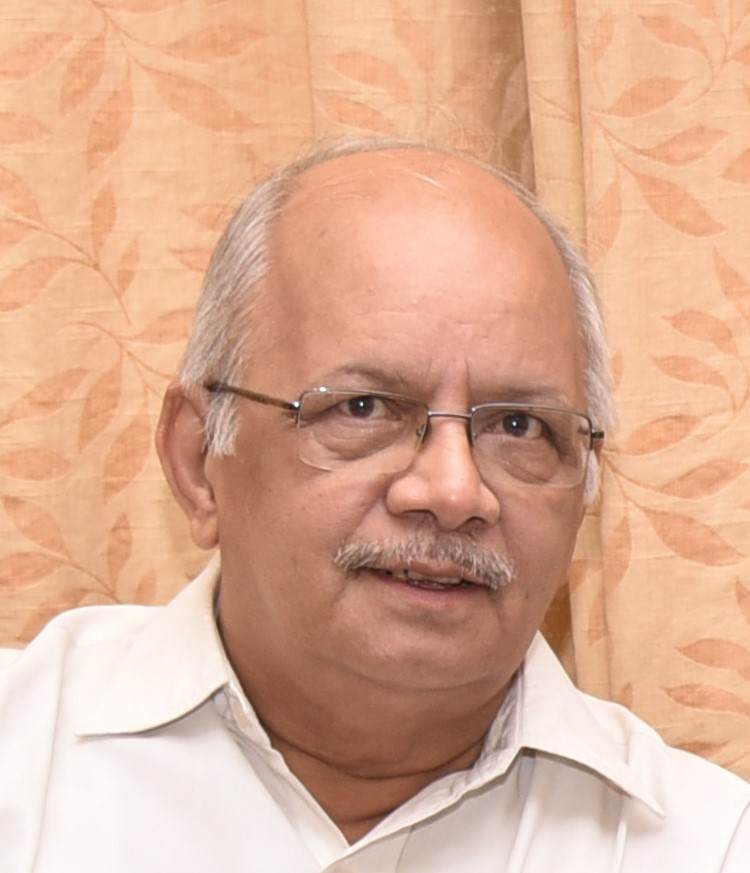
- Born: 27 March 1954 (age 72); Nainital, Uttarakhand, India
- Education: Ph.D. Linguistics, B.A.(Hons) French Language and Literature
- Alma mater: Jawaharlal Nehru University
- Occupations: Professor, Writer and Journalist
- Spouse(s): Manjari Joshi (TV News Anchor)(Writer, journalist)(Russian Translator)
- Children: Mr. Piyush Joshi (MBA, FMS Delhi), Ms Gunjan Joshi (Dancer, Chau)(Heritage Activist, INTACH Delhi)
- Relatives: Prof. P.C.Joshi (Educationist), Raghuvir Sahay (Poet, Journalist), Giridhar Joshi (Engineer, BITS, Ranchi), Chandrika Joshi (Physics Teacher, SKV Gwalior), Gaurav Joshi (Space scientist, IIT Kharagpur and IIT Mumbai), Chakrapani Joshi (Ecologist, BITS Pilani) Bhal Chandra Joshi (Astrophysics, IIT Rurkee), Hema Singh (Theater Person), Vasant Sahay (US based Engineer)
- Writing career
- Genres: Poetry, short story, journalistic writing
- Subjects: Language, media, international politics

Hemant Joshi is a Professor of Mass Communication and Journalism. He has taught Communication, Radio, TV along with Hindi journalism for three decades at Indian Institute of Mass Communication, New Delhi (1989-2019) and Jamia Millia Islamia, New Delhi (2006–2008).

He is also a poet and a writer who has been contributing columns and articles on various issues in leading Hindi Newspapers.

He knows Hindi, English, French, Italian, and Russian in order of competence. He has worked as an interpreter in various international conferences and translated from French and Hindi and English and vice versa.

Joshi is a member of various national and International bodies i.e. International Association of Mass Communication Research (IAMCR), International Communication Association (ICA), International Pragmatics Association (IPrA), Brussels, Global Initiative for Local Computing (GILC), Ireland, World Association of Community Radio Broadcasters (AMARC).

He was elected a member of the International Council of IAMCR for four years in its annual general body meeting held in Stockholm, Sweden in 2008. His wife is a TV newsreader Manjari Joshi and he is the son-in-law of the Hindi poet, writer, and journalist Raghuvir Sahay.

== Bibliography ==
- Mahayuddhon ke Aaspaas (महायुद्धों के आसपास) (Translated Anthology of 8 French Poets), Gaurav Prakashan, New Delhi.
- Arthat (अर्थात्) (Ed.) (Journalistic writings of Raghuvir Sahay), Rajkamal Prakashan, New Delhi.
- Asserting Voices (Edited with Sanjay Kumar), Deshkaal Prakashan, New Delhi.
- Writing for Media (2011), (co author Mrs. Manjari Joshi), Vikas Publishing House, New Delhi. ISBN 978-81-259-4866-7
- Fundamentals of Journalism and Mass Communication (2011), (co author Mrs. Manjari Joshi), Vikas Publishing House, New Delhi. ISBN 978-81-259-4807-0
- Communication for Development (2011), (co author Mrs. Manjari Joshi), Vikas Publishing House, New Delhi. ISBN 978-81-259-4817-9
