= Chen Liangting =

Chinese translator (1929–2020)

- 陈良廷
- Born: 1929; Chanyang District, Shantou, Guangdong, China
- Died: 23 April 2020 (aged 91); Shanghai, China
- Education: Kwang Hua University
- Occupation: Translator
- Spouse: Liu Wenlan
- Relatives: Liu Renjing (father-in-law)
- Writing career
- Language: Chinese, English
- Genre: Novel
- Notable works: The Old Man and the Sea; The Chronicles of Narnia

Chinese name
- Traditional Chinese: 陳良廷
- Simplified Chinese: 陈良廷
Transcriptions
Standard Mandarin
- Hanyu Pinyin: Chén Liángtíng

Chen Liangting (Chinese: 陈良廷; 1929–2020) was a Chinese translator. He is famous for translating American literary works. He was a member of the China Democratic League.

== Biography ==
Chen was born in Chaoyang District of Shantou, Guangdong, in 1929. He secondary studied at Guanghua Experimental Middle School. In 1947 he was accepted by Kwang Hua University (now East China Normal University). After university, he worked at Warner Films in Shanghai as a subtitle translator. Since 1951, he engaged in translation for foreign literature. Since 1978, he focused on translating and introducing American contemporary dramas and popular fiction.

He was a member of the China Writers Association and Shanghai Museum of Literature and History.

== Personal life ==
In 1951, Chen married Liu Wenlan (刘文澜; born 1931), who is also a translator. His father-in-law Liu Renjing was one of the early leaders of the Chinese Communist Party.

== Translations ==
- The Old Man and the Sea (老人与海)
- The Ice On Kilimanjaro Mountain (乞力马扎罗山上的雪)
- Gone with the Wind (乱世佳人)
- The Chronicles of Narnia (纳尼亚传奇)
- The Maltese Falcon (马耳他黑鹰)
