= Annemarie Horschitz-Horst =

German translator

- Born: Annemarie Hulda Julie Rosenthal; 22 September 1899; Berlin, German Empire
- Died: July 1970 (aged 70) near Vienna, Austria
- Occupation: Translator
- Spouse: Walter Horschitz-Horst (m. 1921, divorced)
- Children: 1

Annemarie Hulda Julie Horschitz-Horst (née Rosenthal; 22 September 1899, in Berlin – July 1970 near Vienna) was a German translator of literature from English, known for being the first translator of Ernest Hemingway's works into German.

== Biography ==
Born Annemarie Rosenthal in Berlin in 1899, she married the banker Walther Horschitz-Horst (1880–1945) in Berlin in 1921. The couple had one daughter, Margaret, and later divorced, after which she remained with her daughter in Berlin. As a Jew, she could not continue work as a translator in Nazi Germany and she fled to London in 1933. She died near Vienna in July 1970.

== Career ==
Horschitz-Horst became known as the primary German translator of Ernest Hemingway's works, and the only one authorised by Hemingway himself. The first to appear in print was her translation of The Sun Also Rises published by Rowohlt Verlag in 1928. Her translations have been considered controversial by some contemporary and current translators; Tom Appleton wrote in 2005 that Hemingway often came across rather strangely in German and attributed this to Horschitz-Horst's language choices. The journalist and Hemingway specialist Wolfgang Stock also noted some deficiencies in her translations, such as the marlin in The Old Man and the Sea becoming a swordfish (Schwertfisch) in the German, and "son of a bitch" being translated as the weaker verdammten Person ("damned person"). However, Stock also praised her prose in general and observed the difficulty of translating Hemingway's sparse style into German. Hemingway himself remained faithful to her as his translator and described her as "the best translator I have ever had in any language" in a letter to Ernst Rowohlt in 1946.
