= Xiang Xingyao =

Chinese translator

- Born: 1924; Suzhou, Jiangsu, China
- Died: 1997 (aged 72–73); China
- Occupation: Translator
- Spouse: Xing Guifen
- Writing career
- Language: Chinese, English, Russian
- Genre: Novel
- Notable work: My Past and Thoughts

Chinese name
- Traditional Chinese: 項星耀
- Simplified Chinese: 项星耀
Transcriptions
Standard Mandarin
- Hanyu Pinyin: Xiàng Xīngyào

Xiang Xingyao (Chinese: 项星耀; 1924 – 28 October 1997) was a Chinese translator and associate professor at Fujian Normal University. He was one of the main translators of the works of the Russian writer Alexander Herzen into Chinese. Some of his English translations were published by People's Literature Publishing House.

== Biography ==
Xiang was born in Suzhou, Jiangsu, in 1924. After the establishment of the Communist State, he taught at East China Normal University in Shanghai.

In October 1969, he was sent to the May Seventh Cadre Schools to do farm works in Xinan Commune (溪南公社) of Xiapu County, Fujian Province. After the Cultural Revolution, he taught at Fujian Normal University.

He died of intestinal cancer on October 28, 1997.

== Personal life ==
Xiang married Xing Guifen (邢桂芬), who was an actress at Fanghua Yue Opera Troupe (芳华越剧团).

== Translations ==
- My Past and Thoughts (往事与随想)
- Middlemarch (米德尔马契)
- The Portrait of a Lady (一位女士的画像)
- Mansfield Park (曼斯菲尔德庄园)
