= Sampsa Peltonen =

Finnish literary translator and critic (born 1975)

Sampsa Peltonen (born 1975) is a Finnish translator and literary critic. He has translated works of literature, TV programmes and non-fiction, from Arabic and French into Finnish, and occasionally also has been working as a simultaneous interpreter. Peltonen has translated works by Hassan Blasim, Leïla Slimani, Adania Shibli and Mohamed Mbougar Sarr, among others.

Peltonen has advocated multilingualism and translation, stressing their importance in understanding difference and emphasising that "our view of the world will shrink if the sources of the texts that surround us become fewer and less diverse. One of the best ways to get to know others is to get to know the texts they produce."

== Awards and recognition ==
Peltonen was awarded the WSOY Literary Foundation's 2014 Recognition Award for his translation of contemporary Arabic fiction. Together with fellow translator Marja Luoman he received the Mikael Agricola Prize and the Kaarle Prize in 2023 for their translation of Mohamed Mbougar Sarr's novel The Deepest Secrets of Men.

Peltonen has been part of the panel of judges for the 2025 International Prize for Arabic Fiction (IPAF). In an interview with ArabLit magazine, he discussed how his background as a translator informs his approach to the judging process, and why the diversity of the IPAF shortlist is an example of the richness of contemporary Arabic literature.
