= Acija Alfirević =

Croatian academic (born 1951)

- Born: 12 August 1951 (age 75); Split, Croatia, Yugoslavia
- Occupation: Teaching

Acija Alfirević (born 12 August 1951) is a Croatian theatre scholar. He has more than 200 published works and has held professorships in multiple countries around the world. Her published works include a book about Harold Pinter and one on Australian drama.

== Biography ==
Acija Alfirević was born in Split, Croatia on 12 August 1951. She studied languages, literature and philosophy at University of Zadar then at University of Zagreb, graduating in 1976. Alfirević then attended Richmond upon Thames College and South Thames Colleges Group to study English, followed by East European Studies at University of London. In 1982-5 Alfirević was granted a Fulbright Program scholarship by the State University of New York as a researcher professor in the Department of Slavic Languages and Literatures. She returned to Zagreb to study for a Master's degree in Australian theatre in 1996, before finally receiving her PhD in 2017 with her thesis on Harold Pinter.

Alfirević worked as a professor during her studies, with placements in London, New York, Zagreb, Melbourne, Budapest, Berlin and Kraków. She has more than 200 published works, including her translations of other Croatian works.

In 2023, Alfirević won the Demetar's Lifetime Achievement award from the Croatian Society of Theatre Critics and Theatre Scholars.

== Works ==
Alfirević's books include "Harold Pinter's Theatre of Cruelty", a book regarded as a homage to Harold Pinter. The Australian New Wave, which focusses on Australian drama between the 1960s and 1990s. Her poetry has been published in multiple anthologies of Croatian Love Poetry.
