= Song Zhaolin =

Chinese translator

- 宋兆霖
- Born: 1928; Jinhua, Zhejiang, China
- Died: 2011 (aged 82–83); China
- Education: Zhejiang University
- Occupation: Translator
- Children: 3
- Writing career
- Pen name: Yulin; Lin Tianshui
- Language: Chinese, English
- Notable works: Jane Eyre; A Tale of Two Cities; David Copperfield

Song Zhaolin (Chinese: 宋兆霖; pinyin: Sòng Zhàolín; 1928 – 7 June 2011) was a Chinese translator. He was most notable for being one of the main translators into Chinese of the novels of Jane Eyre, A Tale of Two Cities and David Copperfield.

== Biography ==
Song was born in Jinhua, Zhejiang, in 1928. In 1953 he graduated from Zhejiang University, where he majored in English language and literature. He started to publish works in 1950. In 1984 he joined the China Writers Association. He was a member of the Chinese Communist Party (CCP). On June 7, 2011, he died at the age of 83.

== Personal life ==
Song had three sons.

== Translations ==
- Charlotte Bronte (2015). Jane Eyre 简爱 (in Chinese). Beijing: Writers Publishing House. ISBN 9787506379786.
- Emily Brontë (2015). Wuthering Heights 呼啸山庄 (in Chinese). Beijing: Central Compilation & Translation Press. ISBN 9787511726162.
- Charles Dickens (2015). A Tale of Two Cities 双城记 (in Chinese). Beijing: Writers Publishing House. ISBN 9787506379809.
- Charles Dickens (2015). David Copperfield 大卫·科波菲尔 (in Chinese). Beijing: Writers Publishing House. ISBN 9787506379762.
