= Sun Zhili =

Chinese translator

- 孙致礼
- Born: 1942 (age 83–84); China
- Occupation: Translator
- Writing career
- Language: Chinese, English
- Period: 1979–present
- Genre: Novel
- Notable works: Pride and Prejudice; Sense and Sensibility; Mansfield Park; Emma

Sun Zhili (simplified Chinese: 孙致礼; traditional Chinese: 孫致禮; pinyin: Sūn Zhìlǐ; born 1942) is a Chinese translator. He is among the first few in China who translated the works of Jane Austen's into Chinese language. His translations are well respected by domestic and overseas scholars.

== Biography ==
Sun was born in 1942 in China. He was a professor at the PLA College of Foreign Languages (now PLA Information Engineering University). He started to publish works in 1979, after the Cultural Revolution.

== Personal life ==
Sun married Tang Huixin (Chinese: 唐慧心), who is also an English teacher.

== Translations ==
- Jane Austen (2018). Pride and Prejudice 傲慢与偏见 (in Chinese). Beijing: Yilin Press. ISBN 9787544774697.
- Sense and Sensibility 理智与情感 (in Chinese). Beijing: China Aerospace Press. 2015. ISBN 9787515909233.
- Emily Brontë (2014). Wuthering Heights 呼啸山庄 (in Chinese). Beijing: Yilin Press. ISBN 9787544748636.
- Ernest Hemingway (2015). The Old Man and the Sea 老人与海 (in Chinese). Beijing: China Aerospace Press. ISBN 9787515909257.
- Ernest Hemingway (2013). A Farewell to Arms 永别了，武器 (in Chinese). Beijing: Beijing Yanshan Publishing House. ISBN 9787540227791.
