= Catharina Burea =

Swedish translator (1601–1678)

- Born: 22 January 1601
- Died: 24 December 1678 (aged 77)
- Occupation: Translator

Catharina Burea (22 January 1601 – 24 December 1678) was a Swedish translator.

== Family ==
Burea was the daughter of Margareta Martini Bäng and Johannes Tomæ Agrivillensis Buræus (Bure). Her father tutored King Gustavus Adolphus of Sweden and was the first keeper of national antiquities. In 1629, Burea married Johan Henriksson Axehielm [sv], who succeeded her father as the first keeper of national antiquities. They had a son together called Henrik Axehielm.

== Career ==
Burea translated the writings of Lutheran theologian Matthias Hafenreffer into Swedish, which was first published in 1612 and became the rudimentary theology book in Sweden. Burea also corresponded with Swedish noblewoman and writer Vendela Skytte in Latin.

== Death ==
Burea died on 24 December 1678, aged 77.
