= Stevns Translation Prize =

- Country: United Kingdom / United States
- Status: Active
- Website: https://premiostrega.it/PSE/

The Stevns Translation Prize is an annual award for literary translation, established in 2018 with the generous endowment of Martha Stevns. Initially known as the Peirene Stevns Prize, it is administered by Peirene Press (UK) and Two Lines Press (USA). The prize is specifically designed to support emerging translators; it is open to anyone over 18 years of age who has not yet published a full work of fiction in translation.

Unlike many other translation awards, the Stevns Prize is unique because each year a different source language and book is selected. Entrants are invited to translate an extract from the chosen work. The winner receives a commission to translate the entire book for publication, a mentorship from an experienced literary translator, and a translation retreat in the French Pyrenees. The prize is named after Martha Stevns, who created the endowment with the aim of helping to break down linguistic barriers.

== Martha Stevns ==
Martha Stevns worked as an editor at the Swiss art magazine Du, and ran her own contemporary art gallery in the UK. She moved to the UK in 1985. She is a member of the Society of Analytical Psychology and in private practice in Cambridge. Her late husband Neils Stevns founded The Australian/Vogel Literary Award with Unwin Australia. He created the endowment for the Australian award with the goal of encouraging young Australian writers to enter the competition with an unpublished manuscript.

== About the prize ==
Each year a different language and book is selected. Entrants are invited to translate an extract from the chosen work. The winner receives a commission to translate the entire book for publication, receives mentorship from an experienced translator, and spends up to six weeks at a translation retreat in the French Cévennes.

== Winners ==
| Year | Winner | Language | Author | Book | Mentor |
|---|---|---|---|---|---|
| 2019 | J. Ockenden | Italian | Claudio Morandini | Neve, Cane, Piede | Jenny Higgins |
| 2020 | John Litell | Swedish | Andrea Lundgren | Nordic Fauna | Sarah Death |
| 2021 | Claire Wadie | Spanish | Manuel Astur | San, el libro de los milagros | Sophie Hughes |
| 2022 | James Young | Portuguese (Brazil) | Victor Heringer | O amor dos homens avulsos | Sophie Lewis |
| 2023 | Marielle Sutherland | German (Swiss) | Yael Inokai | Ein simpler Eingriff | Jamie Bulloch |
| 2024 | Anne Thompson Melo | Dutch | Eva Meijer | Zee Nu | Michele Hutchison |
| 2025 | Dina Leifer | French | Anne Pauly | Avant que j’oublie | Adriana Hunter |
| 2026 | Ally Le | Vietnamese | Maik Cây | Bảo Tàng Lông [Museum of Hair] | Nguyễn An Lý |
