= Nana Isaia =

Greek poet, painter and translator

Nana Isaia or Issaia (Greek: Νανά Ησαΐα) (1934–2003) was a Greek poet, painter and translator. Her poetry was translated into English, Russian and Italian. She translated work by Susan Sontag, Sylvia Plath, T. S. Eliot, Hermann Hesse and Thomas Mann into Greek.

== Life ==
Nana Isaia was born in Athens in 1934. After high school she studied at a London secretarial school for a year, before returning to work as secretary to the Prime Minister Constantine Karamanlis. In 1960 she studied for four years at the Vakalo College of Art and Design.

Isaia then lived on the island of Hydra for four years, where she came to know Leonard Cohen. In 1974 she had a one-person show of her paintings.

She died on 22 January 2003.

== Works ==
- Poemata [Poems]. 1969.
- Persona. 1972.
- Ena vlemma [A Glance]. 1974.
- Meres kai nychtes choris semasia [Days and Nights Without Significance]. 1977.
- e Alike ste chora ton thavmaton [Alice in Wonderland]. 1977
- Morphe [Form]. 1980.
- Sten taktike ton pathon [In the Tactic of Passion]. 1982.
- Synaisthese lethes [Consciousness of Oblivion]. 1982.
