= Tatiana Gnedich =

Russian translator

Tatiana Grigorievna Gnedich (January 18, 1907 – November 7, 1976) was a Russian translator.

== Studies and Incarceration ==
She hailed from a family of poets and scholars, among her ancestors was Nikolai Gnedich, a famous translator of Homer. She moved to Leningrad in 1926 and studied at the Leningrad Institute of History, Philosophy and Linguistics, graduating in 1934. Five years later, she began teaching foreign languages at the First Institute of Foreign Languages. Some years after Russia entered the Second World War, she served as a translator and from 1943 to 1944 she lectured at the Herzen Leningrad State Teacher's Training Institute; she also served as dean of the Herzen literature faculty. While never having left Russia, Gnedich spoke English and French fluently. She was arrested on December 27, 1944, and sentenced to ten years in a labor camp. She was sentenced on charges of "treason to the Soviet motherland."

== Translation of Don Juan ==
While in captivity, Gnedich translated Don Juan by Lord Byron into Russian. She knew the original, more than 16,000 lines, by heart. It took several years to complete, and she often had to secure paper from a guard who was sympathetic to her work. The Russian edition was published in 1956. In 1957, the Soviet Writers' Union hosted a reading in honor of Tatiana Gnedich. She read excerpts from Don Juan.

Director Nikolay Akimov read Gnedich's Russian Don Juan on vacation. In a project with Gnedich, they adapted the poem into a stage performance.

== Literature ==
- Susanna Witt. "Byron's Don Juan in Russian and the 'Soviet school of translation'." Translation and interpreting studies vol. 11 no. 1 (2016), pp. 23–43.
- Entry in St. Petersburg Encyclopedia.
