= Svetlana Geier =

Russian-German translator

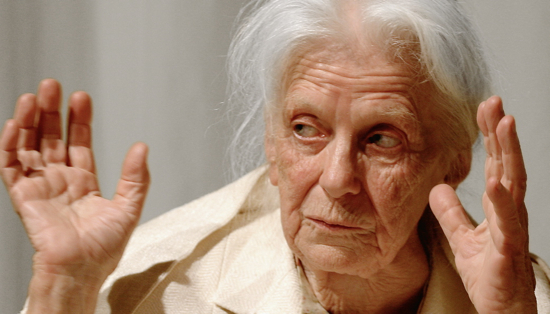
- Svetlana Geier, 2008.
- Born: Svetlana Michailovna Ivanova; 26 April 1923; Kiev, Soviet Union
- Died: 7 November 2010 (aged 87); Freiburg im Breisgau, Germany
- Occupation: Translator
- Writing career
- Notable works: Verbrechen und Strafe (1866); Der Idiot (1868–1869); Böse Geister (1871–1872); Ein grüner Junge (1875); Die Brüder Karamasow (1879–1880)

Svetlana Geier, born Svetlana Michailovna Ivanova, (26 April 1923 in Kiev, USSR – 7 November 2010 in Freiburg im Breisgau, Germany) was a literary translator who translated from her native Russian into German. She lived in Germany from 1943 until her death in 2010.

== Biography ==
Svetlana Geier was born in Kiev in 1923, the daughter of Russian parents. Her father was a scientist with a specialty in plant breeding. Her mother came from a family of Tsarist officers. Her father was arrested in 1938 during the period of Stalin's Great Purge, and died in 1939 from illnesses stemming from his time in prison. Geier had a sheltered childhood, receiving private tuition in both France and Germany early in her life. In 1941, the year the German army invaded the Soviet Union, she passed her school exams with excellent grades, and was accepted as a student at the National Academy of Sciences of Ukraine in the Faculty of West European languages. There she also worked as a translator for the Institute of Geology.

Following the German invasion of Kiev, she became an interpreter for the Dortmund Bridge Building company on their site in Kiev. She had been promised a scholarship to study in Germany if she worked for the Germans for a year. In 1943, following the defeat of the German troops at the Battle of Stalingrad, the company had to close down its site in Kiev. Geier was well aware that, having worked for the Germans, her fellow countrymen regarded her as a collaborator and that she would never be able to study in the Soviet Union. Her mother, too, no longer wanted to live with the "murderers of her/Svetlana’s father", so they joined up with the bridge building firm that was returning to Germany. There they were arrested and taken to a camp for workers from the East, from which they managed to escape with the help of friends after six months.

Having proven her excellent translating skills in an exam at the Alexander von Humboldt Foundation, Geier was awarded a scholarship with which she could realize her dream of studying languages. Together with her mother, she moved to Günterstal in Freiburg, and started her studies in Literature and Comparative Linguistics at the University of Freiburg in 1944. After her marriage she took her husband's name, Geier. She had two children and lived in Günterstal until her death in 2010.

In 1960 Geier started teaching Russian at the University of Karlsruhe. From 1964 onwards she had a contract to teach for eight hours a week. She took the train to Karlsruhe one day a week until she died. In addition, from 1964 to 1988 she was a lector for Russian in the Department of Slavistics at the University of Freiburg. From 1979 to 1983 she also taught Russian language and literature at the University of Witten/Herdecke.

She did a great deal of work to enhance the teaching of Russian outside the university. At the Kepler-Gymnasium (grammar school) in Freiburg she raised the profile of Russian so that the language was available to choose as an exam subject, which she taught herself for many years. In addition, she was responsible for the teaching of Russian at various Steiner schools throughout Germany for a period of 25 years.

She began working as a translator in Germany for the then newly published series Rowohlt Classics.

She was a member of the PEN centre in Germany.

She died on 7 November 2010 at the age of 87 in her house in Günterstal. This house, where she lived for over 50 years, and which belonged to the city of Freiburg, was to become a centre for translation through the efforts of a private initiative. However, this plan was never realized and the city sold the house.

== Works ==
Svetlana Geier ranks amongst the most important translators of Russian literature in the German-speaking world. Amongst other works, she translated those of Tolstoy, Bulgakov and Solzhenitsyn. She spent 20 years translating Dostoevsky's five major novels, which she completed in 2007. She chose to translate by dictating to an assistant, who copied the words down with a typewriter.

She did not hesitate to reformulate older, well-known titles, although she insisted she did nothing more than translate from the original Russian. However, her choice of title for Dostoevsky's most famous novel (Crime and Punishment) had already been chosen by the earlier translators Alexander Eliasberg (1921) and Gregor Jarcho (1924) respectively.

== Film ==
2009: Die Frau mit den 5 Elefanten, Documentary by Vadim Jendreyko (English trailer).

== Awards ==
Svetlana Geier received numerous awards and prizes for her outstanding contribution to the dissemination of Russian culture, history and literature, including the following:

- 1995: Reinhold-Schneider-Preis from the city of Freiburg
- 1995: Leipzig Book Award for European Understanding
- 1998: Order of Merit from the University of Karsruhe
- 2000: Goldene Eule der Sokratischen Gesellschaft (The Golden Owl from the Socrates Society)
- 2003: Order of Merit of Baden-Württemberg
- 2004: Honorary Degree from the Philosophy and History Faculty of the University of Basel
- 2007: Leipzig Book Fair Prize in the category of translation
- 2007: Honorary Doctorate from the University of Freiburg
