= Elizabeth Weber =

South African woman writer (born 1923)

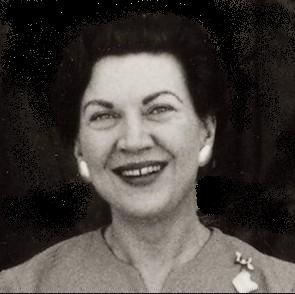
Elizabeth Weber

Elizabeth Weber (born 18 June 1923) is the pen-name of Elizabeth Marais (née Elizabeth Olivier). She flourished during a short, intense period of high-quality literary production in Afrikaans between the years 1949 and 1952 (see Bibliography below), after which, apart from translations of children’s literature from English into Afrikaans, and nursery stories in Afrikaans published sometime thereafter, she disappeared from public view.

== Biography ==
She was born on 18 June 1923 in Germiston, a small city on the East Rand, to the east of Johannesburg. She matriculated in 1939 from the local English high school, and thereafter took the BA degree at the University of the Witwatersrand with Afrikaans, English and Classics as majors. After a year at a teachers’ training college, she taught Afrikaans until the end of 1947, when she left to work in radio-broadcasting at the Afrikaans Language section of the BBC in London. After a three-year stay abroad, she returned to Johannesburg to an office job with a publisher and book distribution organization, probably the now defunct APB (Afrikaans Pers-Boekhandel) whose headquarters were at 769 Joubert Street in Johannesburg, South Africa. Significantly, the author published her entire oeuvre through APB. She then returned to teaching, after which nothing more is recorded of her work or whereabouts.

She married Mr. Sarel Marais, and had two sons of that union. She also had one brother, the Reverend Phil Olivier of Cape Town, who was also an author, and a younger sister, who dedicated her life to music.

She received honourable mention from the scions of Afrikaans literary critique, Nienaber, Senekal, and Bothma, who, writing in the early 1950s, stated, “... amongst the many writers (especially authoresses) in the field of complex love relationships, Elizabeth Weber, with her understanding of how complex relationships develop, and her gift for being able to express ‘the relative’ in human relations, has produced substantive literary material ...”.

== Waar is die liefde? ==
Possibly her most acclaimed work, Waar is die liefde? was published in 1950 by APB in their Môrester series. The novel has, as mise-en-scène, the private cabins and decks of a liner en route from Cape Town to England where happenstance and fate all play havoc with a marriage under stress. As a book critic of the now-defunct newspaper, Die Vaderland, wrote, “What the author offers here is presumably the reworking of a trip that she herself had made. It is clear that Elizabeth Weber has a pair of wide-awake, wide-open eyes. She has the ability to rapidly distil and process her observations, and then, in elegant style, to express them. The density of the language, the torrent of delicate and fine observations, the aura of sense, feeling and sentiments, and the angst of self-awareness in her writing are all reminiscent of the style and intent of Marcel Proust in Remembrance of Things Past.

== Bibliography ==
=== Novels ===
- Weber, E. (1949). Die wëe van haar liefde. Johannesburg: APB (Afrikaanse Pers-Boekhandel)
- Weber, E. (1950). Waar is die liefde? Johannesburg: APB (Afrikaanse Pers-Boekhandel).
- Weber, E. (1951). En toe het jy gekom. Johannesburg: APB (Afrikaanse Pers-Boekhandel).
- Weber, E. (1952). Ons jaag skimme na. Johannesburg: APB (Afrikaanse Pers-Boekhandel).

=== Compilation of short stories ===
Weber, E. (1952). Die hart van ‘n vrou. Leesgenotreeks Nr. 3. Johannesburg: APB (Afrikaanse Pers-Boekhandel):

- "Die ontmoeting." pp. 5-21.
- "Willempie." pp. 21-31
- "Die verduideliking." pp. 32-42
- [missing information. pp. 42-54]
- "Tannie Louise." pp. 54-68

=== Translations of children’s literature ===
- Weber, E. (19- ?). Black Beauty. Johannesburg: APB (Afrikaanse Pers-Boekhandel).
- Weber, E. (19- ?). Robinson Crusoe. Johannesburg: APB (Afrikaanse Pers-Boekhandel).
- Weber, E. (1957). Die verhaal van Hiawatha. Johannesburg: APB (Afrikaanse P-Boekhandel).

=== Children’s nursery tales ===
- Weber, E. (19- ?). Sprokies. Johannesburg: APB (Afrikaanse Pers-Boekhandel).
- Weber, E. (19- ?). Tyd om te speel. Johannesburg: APB (Afrikaanse Pers-Boekhandel).
- Weber, E. (19- ?). Hokus Pokus. Johannesburg: APB (Afrikaanse Pers-Boekhandel).
- Weber, E. (19- ?). Veels geluk, Hettie. Johannesburg: APB (Afrikaanse Pers-Boekhandel).
- Weber, E. (19- ?). My oulike baba. Johannesburg: APB (Afrikaanse Pers-Boekhandel).
- Weber, E. (19- ?). My sprokie-teater. Johannesburg: APB (Afrikaanse Pers-Boekhandel).
