= Lia Wyler =

Brazilian translator

Lia Wyler (October 6, 1934 – December 11, 2018) was a Brazilian translator.

Lia graduated with a degree in Literature at PUC-Rio and received her Masters in Communications at Eco-UFRJ, where her thesis was entitled "Translation in Brazil." She was also the author of the first history of translation in Brazil, "Línguas, poetas e bacharéis", ("Languages, Poets, and Scholars"), and she was the president of the National Union of Translators from 1991 to 1993.

Wyler died on December 11, 2018, in Rio de Janeiro.

== Works ==
Lia Wyler was born in Ourinhos, in the State of São Paulo. She translated books since 1969. Her translations include works by English-language authors such as Henry Miller, Joyce Carol Oates, Margaret Atwood, Gore Vidal, Tom Wolfe, Sylvia Plath, Stephen King, and many others. However, it was as translator of the Harry Potter series that she became most well known.
