= Eila Pennanen =

Finnish writer and translator

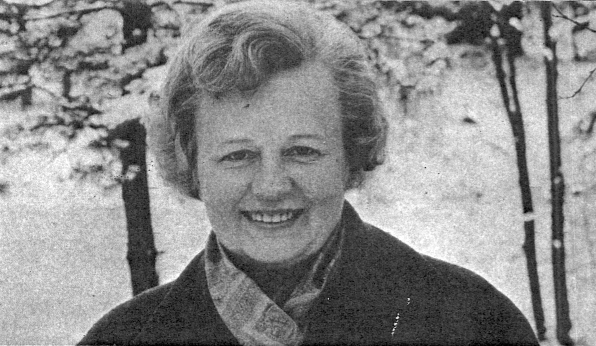
Eila Pennanen

Säde Eila Talvikki Pennanen (8 February 1916, in Tampere – 23 January 1994, in Tampere) was a Finnish writer, critic, essayist, and translator. A key contributor to nurturing Finnish literature, she published approximately twenty novels and a number of short stories and plays. She worked for 40 years as a literary critic and wrote essays for magazines. Pennanen translated a hundred books, trained translators, and lectured.

== Awards ==
Her awards have included:

- 1965, Aleksis Kivi award
- 1971, Mikael Agricola Prize from the Finnish Cultural Foundation
- 1974, Väinö Linna Prize

== Selected works ==
- Ennen sotaa oli nuoruus (1942)
- Kaadetut pihlajat (1944)
- Proomu lähtee yöllä (1945)
- Pilvet vyöryvät (1947)
- Leda ja joutsen (1948)
- Kattoparveke (1950)
- Tornitalo (1952)
- Pyhä Birgitta (1954)
- Tunnussana ystävyys (1956)
- Pasianssi (1957)
- Valon lapset (1958)
- Kylmät kasvot (1960)
- Kaksin (1961)
- Mutta (1963)
- Tunnustelua (1965)
- Mongolit (1966)
- Tilapää (1968)
- Pientä rakkautta (1969)
- Aurinkomatka (1970)
- Kiitos harhaluuloista (1970)
- Himmun rakkaudet (1971)
- Kultaiset leijonankäpälät (1971)
- Koreuden tähden (1972)
- Ruusuköynnös (1973)
- Naisen kunnia (1975)
- Kapakoitten maa (1977)
- Äiti ja poika (1977)
- Mies ja hänen kolme vaimoaan (1978)
- Äiti ja poika ja muita kuunnelmia (1979)
- Lapsuuden lupaus (1979)
- Se pieni ääni (1980)
- Naivistit (1982)
- Santalahden aika (1986)
- Kulmatalon perhe (1988)
- Luettuja, läheistä (1990)
- Tyttölapsi (1992)
