= Shakuntala Baliarsingh =

Indian writer and translator

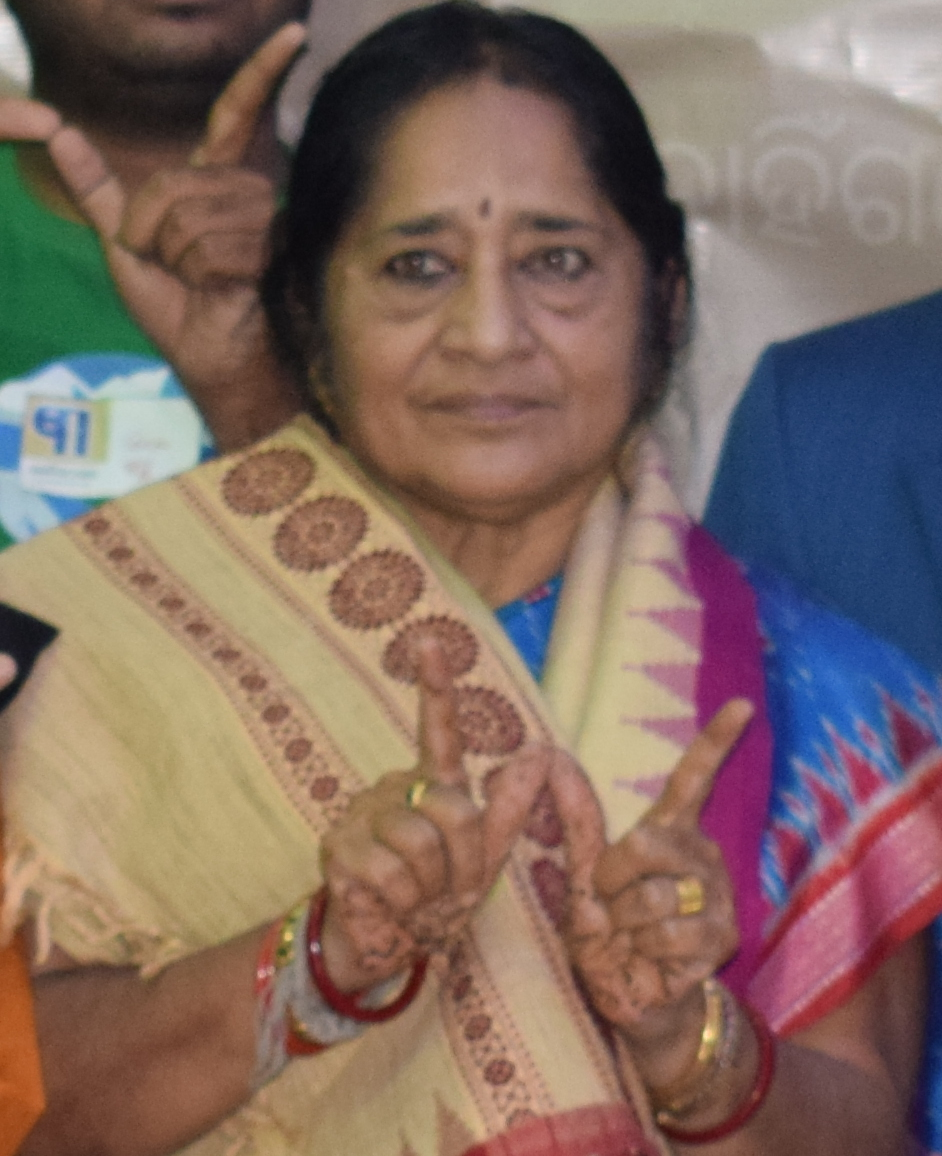
- Born: February 18, 1948 (age 78); Narangarh, Khordha district, Orissa, India
- Education: Utkal University
- Occupations: Writer, translator
- Writing career
- Notable work: Odia Sahityare Jatiyabadi Chetana
- Notable awards: Odisha Sahitya Akademi Award (2009); Sahitya Akademi Translation Prize in 2015

Signature
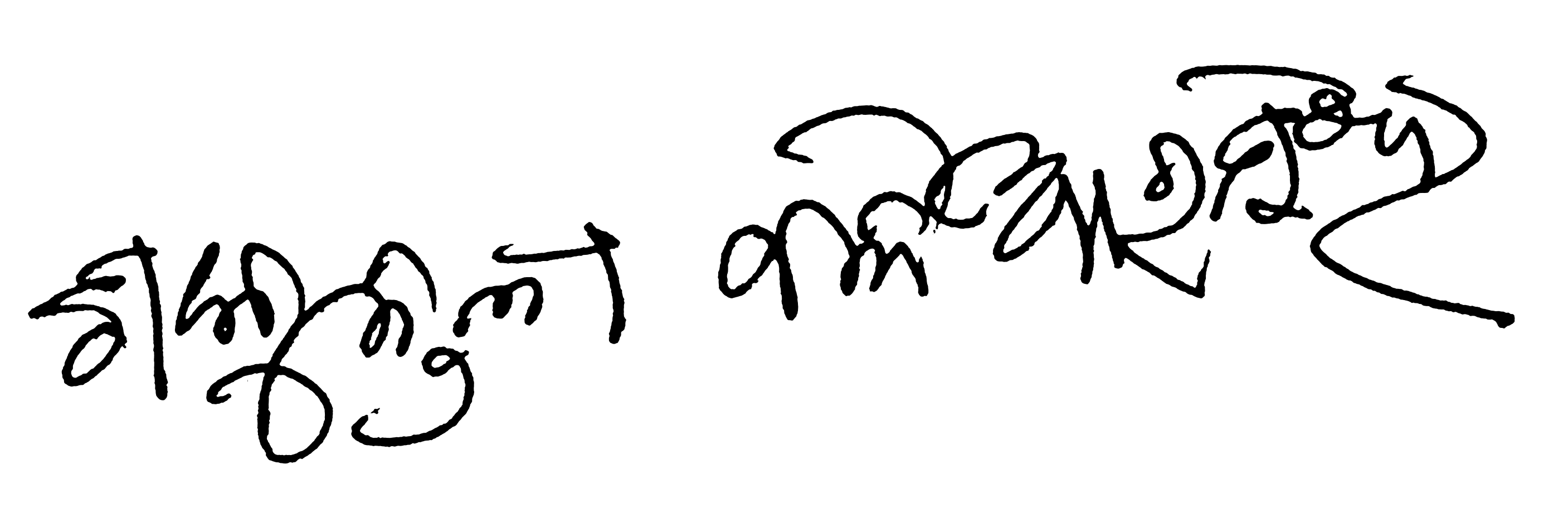

Shakuntala Baliarsingh (Odia: ଶକୁନ୍ତଳା ବଳିଆରସିଂହ; born 25 February 1948) is an Indian Odia language writer and translator.

== Life ==
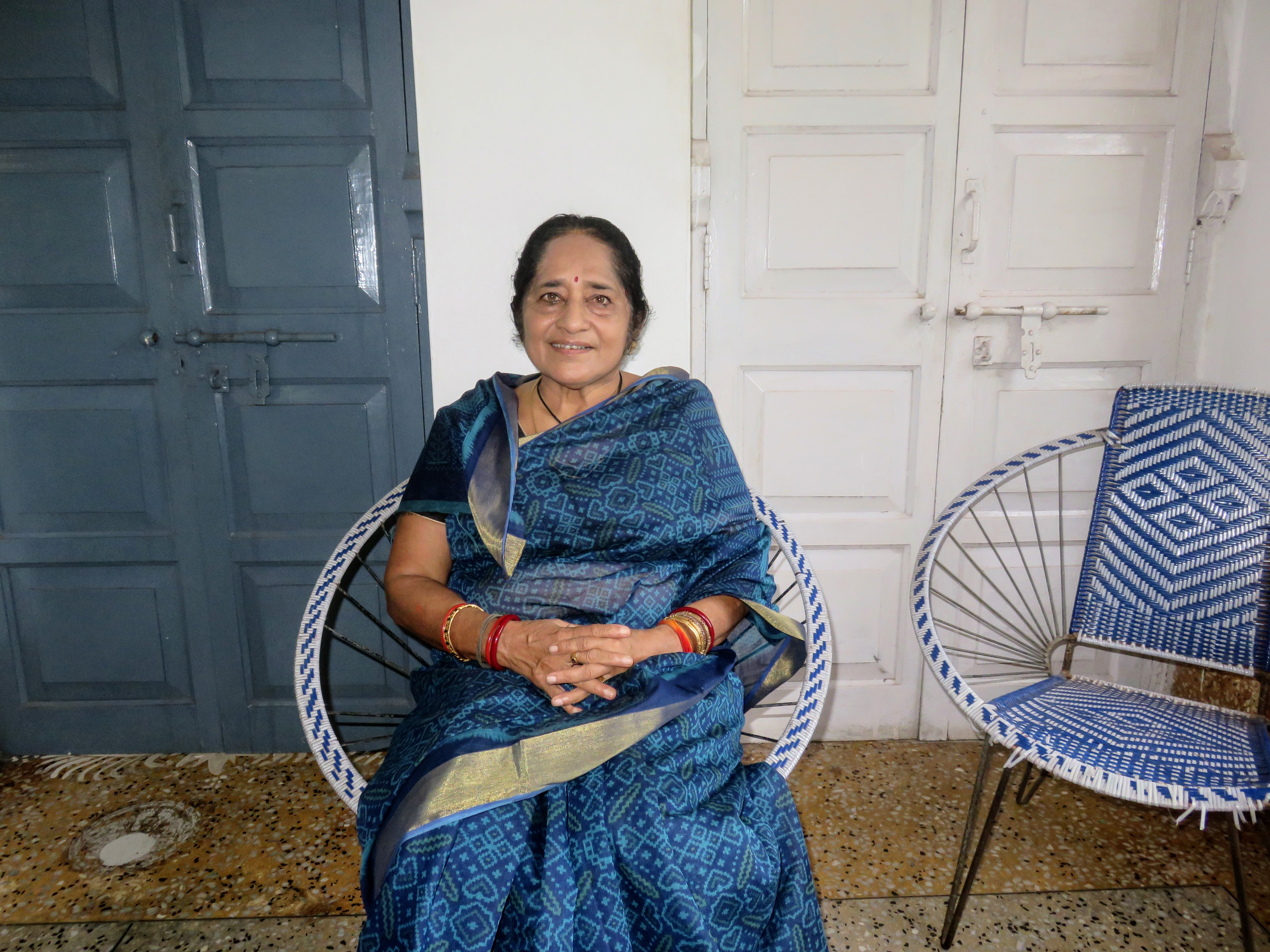
Baliarsingh in 2017

Baliarsingh was born in 1948 at Narangarh in Khordha district, India. She studied at Utkal University.

Baliarsingh has published over 30 books, including Angyata basara itikatha, Swaymsidha, Bipanna Nabika, and Odia Sahityare Jatiyabadi Chetana, which explores the impact of Indian nationalism and consciousness on Oriya literature. She also writes articles for newspapers.

In 2015, Baliarsingh was awarded the Sahitya Akademi Translation Prize for her Odia translation of Tripurasundari Laxmi's work Kaberi Bhali Jhiatie, which was originally written in Tamil.
