= Ngô Tự Lập =

Vietnamese writer, essayist, translator and songwriter

Ngô Tự Lập (born 4 June 1962 in Hanoi) is a Vietnamese writer, poet, essayist, translator and songwriter.

== Life and work ==
Lap was born in Hanoi in 1962. He earned his first University Degree, in Navigation, in the ex-USSR (1986), and then served in Vietnam Navy as captain of a landing ship. In 1990, he entered the Hanoi Law College, from which he graduated in 1993. After a short time working in the Military Supreme Tribunal, he became a literary editor of the Army Publishing House, then the Hanoi Publishing House, and has worked for several newspapers. In 1996, he earned his master's degree in Literature in École Normale Supérieur de Fontenay/Saint Cloud, Paris (now ENS lettres sciences humaines), and in 2006 a PhD at the Illinois State University. Ngo Tu Lap is a member of the Vietnam Writers' Union and Hanoi Writers' Association.

Ngo Tu Lap has published over 20 books, including four books of fictions, two books of poems, five books of essays and many translations from Russian, French and English. Among the authors translated by Ngo Tu Lap are Jorge Luis Borges, Blaise Cendrars, Otto Steiger, and V.N. Voloshinov. Ngo Tu Lap won seven prizes for his writings. His book "Black Stars" was nominated for the PEN Poetry in Translation Award – 2014. His works were translated and published in France, United States, India, Sweden, Belgium, Canada, Thailand, and Czech Republic. The manual "Littérature Francophone" has an entry on Ngo Tu Lap.

His work has been included in such anthologies as Till: igår. Tolv vietnamesiska poeter (Tranan, Sweden, 2010), Legend of the Phoenix; The Other Side of Heaven – an Anthology of American and Vietnamese Post-war Fiction; Au rez de chaussée du paradis, Vietnam berättar: Eldsommar, juliregn, and Diversité culturelle et mondialisation (Autrement, Collection Mutations, Canada, 2004).

== Selected books ==
- "Une tempête hors saison", nouvelle, Fremillerie, Pháp, 2014.
- "Black Stars", poems (in English-Vietnamese), Milkweed, Minneapolis, USA, 2013.
- "The Universe and I" (poems, in Vietnamese & French, Van Hoa, Hanoi, 1997, 2000);
- "The Night Flight in June" (poems, Van Hoa, Hanoi, 2000);
- "Farewell to the Desert Island" (fiction, Van Hoa, Hanoi, 1991);
- "A Fifteen-day Month" (fiction, Hanoi Publishers, Hanoi, 1993, 1994);
- "The Season of Eagles" (fiction, Cong An Nhan Dan, Hanoi, 1995);
- "The Sleepwalking and Other Short Stories" (Selected short fictions, Van Hoc, Hanoi, 1997, 1998, 2001 and 2008);
- "The Strange Sleep of Luong Tu Ban" (Fiction, Hoi Nha Van, Hanoi, 2005);
- "Flights of Labyrinths" (essays, Hoi Nha Van, Hanoi, 2003);
- "The Wisdom of Limits" (essays, Hoi Nha Van, Hanoi, 2005);
- "The Thermometer of Souls" (essays, Hoi Nha Van, Hanoi, 2008).
- "Literature as Allusion Processing" (Monography, Tri Thuc, Hanoi, 2008).
- "The Face of the Others" (Essays, Phu Nu, Hanoi, 2008)
