= Louise Briggs =

English teacher and Esperantist (1870–1945)

Amy Louise Briggs
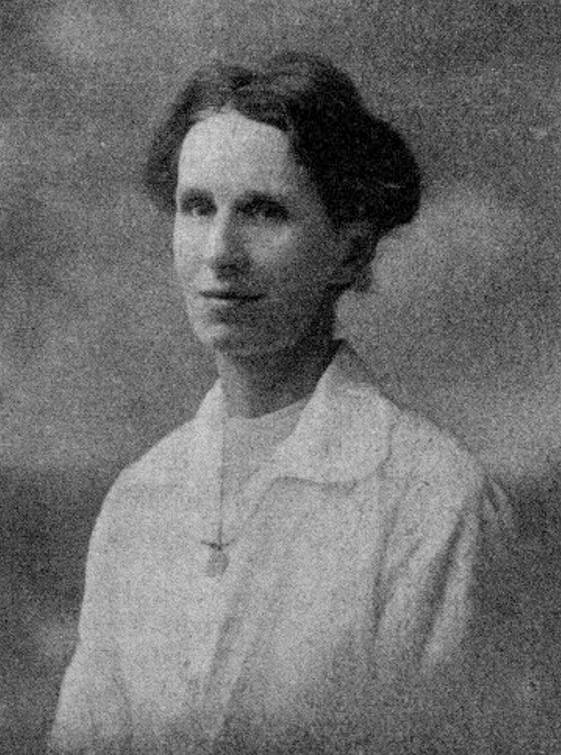
- Briggs in 1923
- Died: 8 January 1945; Leeds, Yorkshire, England
- Occupations: English teacher and Esperanto translator
- Employer: Northcote Girls School
- Notable work: Sonĝo de Someromeza Nokto (1920)

Amy Louise Briggs (c. 1870 – 8 January 1945) was an English teacher and Esperanto translator.

== Biography ==
Briggs taught music and languages at the private institution Northcote Girls School in Leeds. Alongside teaching, she was a member of the Yorkshire Esperanto Federation (Yorkshire Esperanto Federation) and the British Esperanto Association.

In 1920, Briggs translated the play A Midsummer Night's Dream by William Shakespeare from England to Esperanto, with the title Sonĝo de Someromeza Nokto. Belga Esperantisto (Belgian Esperantist) reviewed the work, reporting that: "La versoj de tiu traduko memorigas ofte al tiuj de Hamlet, de D-ro Zamenhof. Ŝajnas al mi, ke ni ne povas fari pli grandan laŭdon de tiu lerta kaj bela traduko." This translates in English to "The verses of this translation are often reminiscent of those of Hamlet, by Dr. Zamenhof. It seems to me that we cannot give greater praise to this skillful and beautiful translation." Her translation was later performed at the British Esperanto Congress in Bristol in 1945.

Briggs translated children's songs into Esperanto, such as Twinkle, Twinkle, Little Star. She also wrote Esperanto language plays, such as Cindrulino (Cinderella).

Briggs died in Leeds, Yorkshire, in 1945.
