= Xenia Dyakonova =

Xenia Dyakonova (Russian: Кссения Дьяконова; St. Petersburg, 1985) is a Russian poet, literary translator, literary critic, and teacher of writing. As a teenager in 1999, she emigrated to Spain with her family and settled in Catalonia.

== Biography ==
Dyakonova began writing poetry at a young age and appeared on several children's and youth radio and television programs in her hometown of St. Petersburg. In 1999, she emigrated to Spain and settled in Catalonia, where she graduated in Literary Theory and Comparative Literature at the University of Barcelona. Since 2004, she has been a professor of humanities and Russian language and literature at the Ateneo Barcelonés Writing School.

Since 2001, Dyakonova has published numerous selections of poems in St. Petersburg and Moscow literary magazines. In 2003, she published her collection of poems Моя жизнь без меня (My Life Without Me) in the St. Petersburg publishing house XXI Century, with a foreword by Alexander Kushner, and in 2007, a second book of poems, Каникулы (Vacation), in the Gelikon-Plius publishing house.

Dyakonova's translations from Russian into Catalan include novels, essays, poems, and newspaper articles by various authors, including Anton Chekhov, Anna Politkovskaya, and Alexander Kushner. From the latter author, she translated ten poems that were published by Café Central in a plaquette (pamphlet), after the poet participated in Kosmopolis 2006 in Barcelona. She has also collaborated with the St. Petersburg State University to translate anthologies of modern Catalan poetry into Russian. Dyakonova and José Mateo Martínez co-translated Catálogo de novedades cómicas de Lev Rubinstein (Catalogue of comic novelties by Lev Rubinstein) (Zonabook, 2007) from Russian into Spanish. Dyakonova is a translator for different publishing houses such as Laertes or Lleonard Muntaner, as well as for different media in Catalonia.

== Selected works ==
=== Poetry collections ===
- 2003, Моя жизнь без меня
- 2007, Каникулы

=== As translator ===
- 2007, Catálogo de novedades cómicas de Lev Rubinstein (with José Mateo Martínez)
