= Daisy Schjelderup =

Norwegian translator and writer (1916–1991)

Daisy Schjelderup (16 June 1916 – 16 October 1991) was a Norwegian translator and writer.

She grew up in Oslo. During the German occupation of Norway she was for a time incarcerated in Grini concentration camp, from September to October 1941.

She made her literary debut in 1976 with the poetry collection Torneroses etterlatte papirer, following in with the short-story collection Sangen om Landegode. In her later years she made a mark as a peace activist and issued the pamphlet Grasbrann. Brev til et menneske on Gyldendal in 1980. As a translator she issued, among others: Herman Melville's Moby Dick, Virginia Woolf's A Room of One’s Own, Mario Puzo's The Godfather, Emily Brontë's Wuthering Heights, and Roald Dahl's Kiss Kiss.

She was married to engineer Gunnar Monsen (1916–1982); as a widow she relocated from Aukra Municipality to Folldal Municipality and represented the Labour Party on the municipal council for Folldal Municipality until 1989 when she stepped down due to health issues. She died in 1991 in Folldal.
