= Wilhelmiina Arpiainen =

Finnish writer and missionary in China (1859-1922)

- Born: 6 November 1859 Pieksämäki, Finland
- Died: 13 February 1922 (aged 62) Yongfeng, China
- Occupation: writer and missionary

Johanna Wilhelmiina Arpiainen (6 November 1859 in Pieksämäki – 13 February 1922 in Yongfeng) was a Finnish teacher, Christian writer, translator and missionary. She worked for 20 years in China as a missionary worker of the Free Church of Finland.

== Biography ==
Wilhelmiina Arpiainen started school in Huutokoski and then continued at a seminary in Jyväskylä, graduating as a public school teacher in 1881. Following her graduation, she worked as a teacher in Säkkijärvi.

== Missionary work ==
Arpiainen began missionary work in China in the city of Yangzhou in 1893 at a female missionaries' training center of China Inland Mission, initially studying the Chinese language. After that, she did missionary work in the city of Zhenjiang at the China Inland Mission mission station together with teacher Verna Hammaren and teacher Agnes Meyer until May 1896, when Meyer traveled to Finland. In November 1899, Arpiainen traveled to Hunan at Hudson Taylor's suggestion with the intention of establishing a Finnish mission station there, but due to the opposition of the Hunan people, nothing came of the project. The residents of Yongxin, Jiangxi province, wanted a CIM employee in their area and had bought a plot of land for a chapel. Arpiainen started missionary work there at the suggestion of Orr-Ewing, the leading missionary of the province. After the Boxer Rebellion, Arpiainen was called to Finland. In Finland, she started to distribute missionary literature to different parts of Finland and served for a short time as the acting director of the Helsinki Bible Home.

== Death ==
Arpiainen traveled through to China and arrived in Shanghai on 16 April 1905. First she tried to get to Hunan, but when she failed, she traveled to Yongxin, from where she moved to Kihan until finding a new job in Yongfeng City. In January 1915, Arpiainen traveled from Yongfeng to Finland on vacation and stayed there for two years. In December 1917, she arrived via Siberia after traveling to Shanghai. Arpiainen worked at Yongfeng until her death on 13 February 1922.

== Works ==
- Muistelmia Kiinasta. A. Christianson, Mikkeli 1903
- Muistelmia matkalta Kiinaan. A. Christianson, Mikkeli 1903 (using pseudonym "Wilhelmiina A.")
- Sananen lähetystyöstä Kiinassa. O. B. Blomfelt, Mikkeli 1903
- Jumalalle uhrattu, O. B. Blomfelt, Mikkeli 1904
- Juutalainen lähetyssaarnaaja, Hämeenlinna 1904
- Pieniä kertomuksia, O. B. Blomfelt, Mikkeli 1904
- Tähkiä, O. B. Blomfelt, Mikkeli 1904
- Mustalaispoika eli Rodney Smith, Tampere 1907
- Kertomus Boksari-kapinan ajalta Kiinassa. Kuopio 1915 (using pseudonym "W-a A-n")
- Lemmenetsijä. Kuopio 1915 (using pseudonym "W-a A-n")
- Muistoseppele: Emma Mäkiselle sitonut Wilhelmiina A. Kuopio 1916

== Translations ==
- Peter Paul Waldenström: Ainoastaan Jeesus se ristillenaulittu. Transl. Wilhelmiina A. P. R. Wiitanen, Parkano 1904
- Peter Paul Waldenström: Hänet otettiin kiinni. Transl. Wilhelmiina A. P. R. Wiitanen, Parkano 1904
- Helene A. Dyer: Pandita eli opettaja Ramabai. Adapted and transl. Wilhelmiina A. Hämeenlinna 1905
- Rikhard Newton: Ihmeellinen kirja. Abridged and transl. Wilhelmiina A. Suomen lähetysseura, Helsinki 1906
- G. Stott: Pieniä kertomuksia Kiinasta. Collected from G. Stott's writings by Vilhelmiina A. Suomen lähetysseura, Helsinki 1907
- Sohvi ja hänen isänsä. Transl. W. A. Suomen Viikkolehti, Tampere 1908
- Kate Hamilton: Kiitos-Anna opettajana. Adapted and transl. W. A. Kuopio 1916
