= Matthias Hafenreffer =

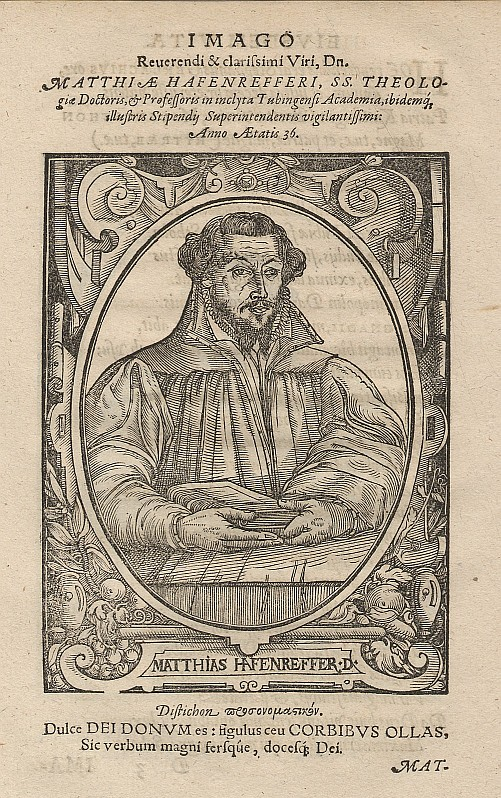
Matthias Hafenreffer

Matthias Hafenreffer (24 June 1561 – 22 October 1619) was a German orthodox Lutheran theologian in the Lutheran scholastic tradition.

Born at Lorch (Württemberg), Hafenreffer was professor at Tübingen from 1592 until his death in 1619. He was a motivating teacher with a charismatic influence upon his students. He combined strict faithfulness to the Book of Concord with a peaceful disposition. Among those who enjoyed his instruction and correspondence was the astronomer Johannes Kepler. His chief work was his system of doctrine under the title Loci Theologici (1600). He died in Tübingen, aged 58.
