= Albena Bakratcheva =

Bulgarian Americanist (born 1961)

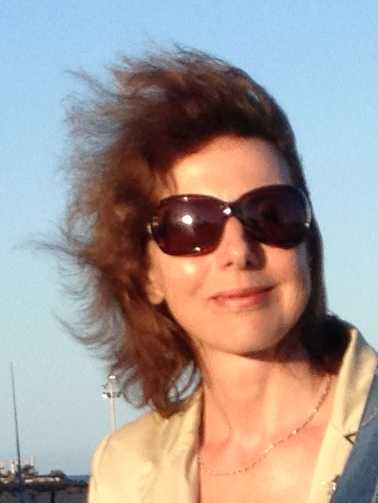
Albena Bakratcheva, 2014

Albena Bakratcheva (Bulgarian: Албена Бакрачева) born in Sofia on July 3, 1961, is Bulgarian Americanist, best known for her work on American Transcendentalism. She is Professor of American Studies at the Department of Foreign Languages and Literatures, New Bulgarian University, Sofia.

== Education ==
Albena Bakratcheva received her master's degree in Bulgarian and English literature from the St Kliment Ohridski University of Sofia in 1984. She defended her PhD thesis on 18th century British Novel and late 19th century Bulgarian Fiction in 1995, and in 2007 was awarded a higher doctorate (D.Litt.) for her dissertation on The Artistic Discourse of American Transcendentalism.

== Career ==
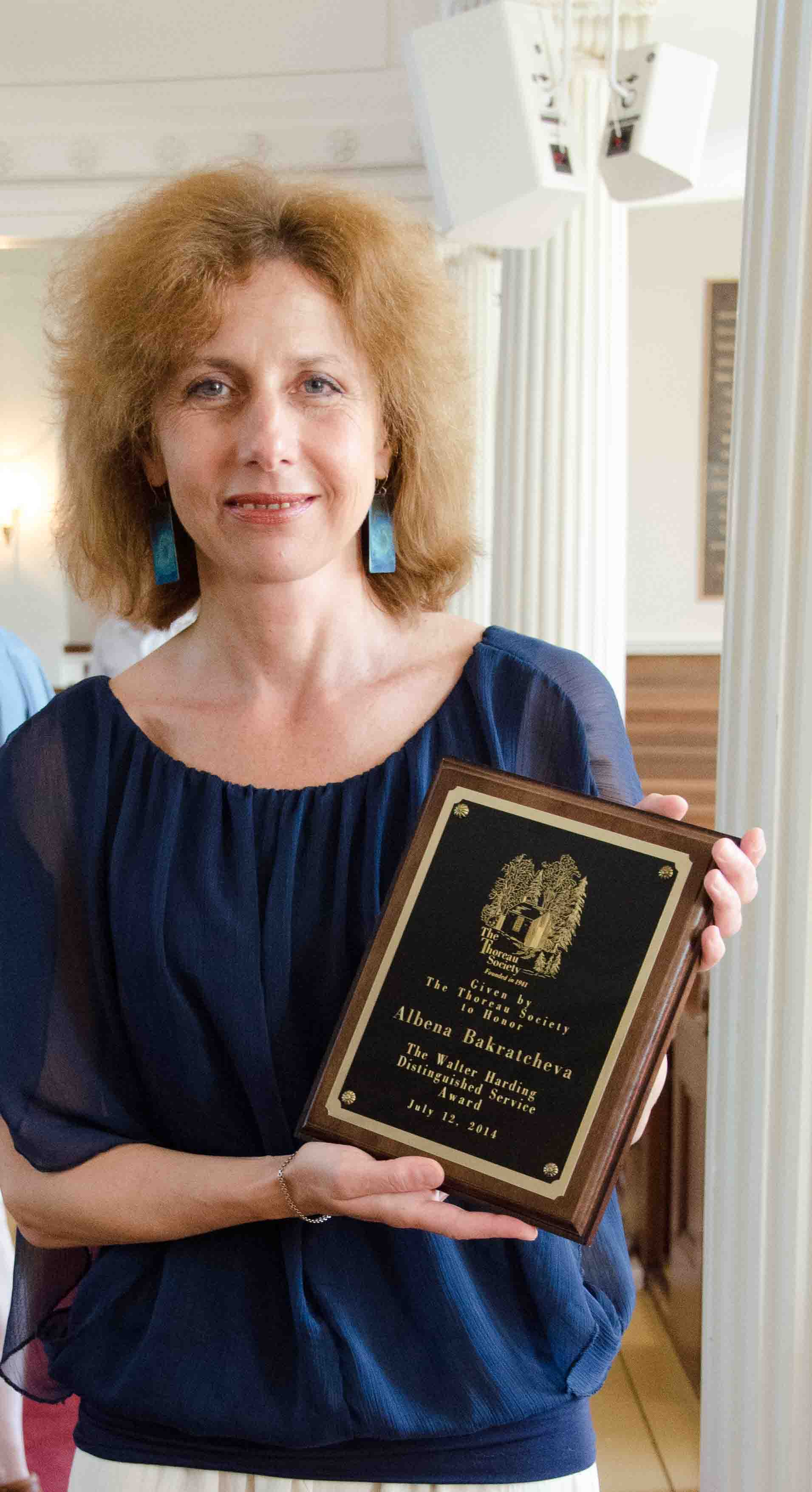
The Thoreau Socyety Award for Distinguished Service, 2014

Bakratcheva has taught at the Department of English, American University in Bulgaria (AUBG), Blagoevgrad (1995–1996), the Department of Theory of Literature, University of Sofia (1995–1996), the Department of Foreign Languages, South-West University "Neofit Rilski", Blagoevgrad (1997–2002), and the Department of Foreign Languages and Literatures, New Bulgarian University, Sofia (2002-current). She has specialized at the John F. Kennedy Institute for North American Studies. Freie Universität Berlin (1992), the State University of New York Geneseo (1993–94) as a Fulbright fellow, and the 1999 Summer Institute on Contemporary American Literature. University of Louisville, Kentucky.

Since 2008, Bakratcheva is Erasmus-Lecturer of American Literature at the Dipartimento di Lingue e letterature moderne. Università degli studi di Macerata, Italia.

Since 2002, Bakratcheva is Chair of the American and British Studies Program, Department of Foreign Languages and Literatures, New Bulgarian University.

== Bibliography ==
=== In English ===
- Bakratcheva, A. (2001). From Interculturality to Multiculturality in Liberal Education - In: FULBRIGHT, Globalization and Cultural Differences. Proceedings of the Fourth International Fulbright Conference, Sofia, May 19–21, 2000. Sofia: Bulgarian-American Commission for Educational Exchange.
- Bakratcheva, A. (2002). The Sun Is but a Morning Star. Online Anthology of American Literature: Volumes I-VI
- Bakratcheva, A. (2003). A Thing of Beauty is a Joy Forever. Online Anthology of British Literature: Volumes I-VI
- Bakratcheva, A. (2003). Interculturality in the Garden: Americanization and Otherness - In: eRUNSMAGAZINE.COM, Issue 6, February.
- Bakratcheva, A. (2003). A Fate That Never Turns Aside: Globalization and Convergence - In: FULBRIGHT, Knowledge, Power and Freedom in a Changing World. Proceedings of the Fifth International Fulbright Conference, Sofia, May 16–18, 2002. Sofia: Bulgarian-American Commission for Educational Exchange.
- Bakratcheva, A. (2003). Visibility Beyond the Visible: American Transcendentalism and/in Bulgarian Culture - In: ZENAF Conference Proceedings, 'Cultural Exchanges between Central/Eastern Europe and America' - East-West American Studies Conference, 29 May - 2 June 2002 at the Zentrum für Nordamerika-Forschung, Johann Wolfgang Goethe-Universität. Frankfurt am Main: Volume 3.
- Bakratcheva, A. (2003). The Wild, The West, The World: The Wild West World or the World Wild West - In: Annual of New Bulgarian University. Department of Applied Linguistics. Issue: Applied Linguistics and Methodics of Foreign Language Teaching. Sofia: New Bulgarian University Press.
- Bakratcheva, A. (2004). Frontier Transcendences: The Need for Local Memories - In: America in the 21st-Century. Proceedings of the International Conference of the Bulgarian-American Fulbright Commission and the Bulgarian American Studies Association (BASA), Sofia, November 21–22, 2003 (Issued on CD). Sofia: Bulgarian-American Commission for Educational Exchange.
- Bakratcheva, A. (2005). The Strange Liberty of Walking 'Walden' - In: The Concord Saunterer. Special 'Walden' Sesquicentennial Issue: Walden the Place and 'Walden' the Book. Published Annually by The Thoreau Society, Concord, Massachusetts, U.S.A.: Volume 12/13, 2004/2005.
- Bakratcheva, A. (2005). Locating the American Voice: Space Relation as Self-Identification in Henry David Thoreau's Vision - In: How Far is America from Here? Selected Proceedings of the First World Congress of the International American Studies Association 22–24 May 2003. Edited by Theo D'haen, Paul Giles, Djelal Kadir, and Lois Parkinson Zamora, Series: TextxeT. Studies in Comparative Literature 47. Amsterdam-New York, New York: Rodopi.
- Bakratcheva, A. (2005). With or Without Principle: Transcending Transcendentalism. Aesthetic Controversies, Receptional Modes - In: Annual of New Bulgarian University. Department of Foreign Languages and Literatures. Issue: Language, Literature, Culture, Volume 6. Sofia: New Bulgarian University Press.
- Bakratcheva, A. (2005). The Sun Is but a Morning Star. Anthology of American Literature: Volume I. Sofia: New Bulgarian University Press.
- Bakratcheva, A. (2006). Metamorphoses of the Frontier: Realities and Haunting Ghosts of Americanization - In: eRUNSMAGAZINE.COM, Issue 42, February.
- Bakratcheva, A. (2006). Revelations of the Place: Transatlantic Romantic Globalizations - In: Spaces, Gaps, Borders. Proceedings of the 8th International Conference of the Bulgarian Society for British Studies held in Sofia, 24–26 October 2003. Volume I, Literature and Cultural Studies. Edited by Dr. Svetlin Stratiev and Assoc. Prof. Vesela Katsarova. Sofia: St. Kliment Ohridski University Press.
- Bakratcheva, A. (2006). Resounding New England Culture Today: Poetic Voices and Visions - In: Culture, Education and Leadership Today and Tomorrow. Proceedings of the 7th International Fulbright Conference, Sofia, May 12–13, 2006 (Issued on CD). Sofia: Bulgarian-American Commission for Educational Exchange.
- Bakratcheva, A. (2007). Thoreau's Way from Emerson to Thoreau: The Gesture of Self-Naming - In: The Thoreau Reader, EServer Web Publishing Project, at Iowa State University. Ed. by Richard Lenat. Iowa: Ames.
- Bakratcheva, A. (2009). The Call of the Green. Thoreau and Place-Sense in American Writing. Veliko Tarnovo: Faber Publishers.
- Albena Bakratcheva. Visibility beyond the Visible. The Poetic Discourse of American Transcendentalism. Amsterdam/New York, NY 2013. XII, 268 pp. Rodopi:(Costerus 196). (ISBN 978-90-420-3556-0)

=== In Bulgarian ===
- Bakratcheva, A. (1987). The Limits and Possibilities of the Literary Theory (1986) (Граници и възможности на литературознанието (1986)) - In: ABV, Sofia, 1, 6.1.
- Bakratcheva, A. (1988). Need or Possibility? (Потребност или възможност) - On the book series of 1986/87 Writer and Society - In: Septemvri, Sofia, 6.
- Bakratcheva, A. (1989). The Saga of Arthur and His Knights (Сказание за Артур и неговите рицари") - On the epic Le Morte d'Arthur by Sir Thomas Malory, Bulgarian translation (1989) - In: Puls, Sofia, 6, 6.2.
- Bakratcheva, A. (1990). Not To Be Afraid of Virginia Woolf (Без страх от Вирджиния Улф) - On the Bulgarian translation (1989) of Mrs. Dalloway by Virginia Woolf - In: Panorama, Sofia, 3.
- Bakratcheva, A. (1990). Politics as Novel and Novel as Politics (Политиката като роман и романът като политика) - On the Bulgarian translation (1989) of Norman Mailer's Armies of the Night - In: Panorama, Sofia, 6,
- Bakratcheva, A. (1992). Similarities in Divergences. Narrative Parallels in the Works of Oliver Goldsmith and Mihalaki Georgiev (Близост в отличията. Особености на повествованието у Михалаки Георгиев и Оливър Голдсмит) - In: Ezik i Literatura, Sofia, 2.
- Bakratcheva, A. (1993). Life as Vocation. Preface. (Животът като призвание, предговор) - In: H. D. Thoreau, Walden. Civil Disobedience. Sofia: Narodna Kultura.
- Bakratcheva, A. (1993). 'Thus the Novel Beginneth...' Narrative Features in the Eighteenth-Century British Novel and Late Nineteenth-Century Bulgarian Fiction ('Тъй се почнуват романите...' Особености на реалистичното повествование в английския просвещенски роман и българската следосвобожденска белетристика) - In: Literaturna Misal, Sofia, 1
- Bakratcheva, A. (1995). Similarities in Divergences. Realistic Narrative Characteristics in the Eighteenth-Century British Novel and Late Nineteenth-Century Bulgarian Fiction (Близост в различията. Особености на реалистичното повествование в английския просвещенски роман и българската следосвобожденска белетристика). Sofia: St. Kliment Ohridski University Press.
- Bakratcheva, A. (1995). Visibility Beyond the Visible. American Literary Transcendentalism (Видимост отвъд видимото: Американският трансцендентализъм) - In: Ezik i Literatura, Sofia, 3.
- Bakratcheva, A. (1996). The Psychological Mystery of Crime: Patricia Highsmith (Психологическата мъглявина на престъплението: Патриша Хайсмит) - In: Vek 21, Sofia, 22, 13-20.10.
- Bakratcheva, A. (1997). Potentialities of Discourse. Bulgarian/British-American Cross-cultural Dialogues (Заложби на отвореността). Sofia: St. Kliment Ohridski University Press.
- Bakratcheva, A. (1997). Amidst the Eternal Cycle: Gloria Naylor (Сред вечния кръговрат: Глория Нейлър) - In: Vek 21, Sofia, 1, 17-23.1.
- Bakratcheva, A. (1997). The Unity of the Whole: Joyce Carol Oates (Единството на цялото: Джойс Каръл Оутс) - In: Vek 21, Sofia, 5, 14-20.2.
- Bakratcheva, A. (1997). The Dark Side of the Ego: Margaret Drabble (Тъмната страна на собственото Аз: Маргарет Драбъл) - In: Vek 21, Sofia, 12, 2-8.5.
- Bakratcheva, A. (1997). Thoreau in Bulgaria (Торо в България) - In: Demokraticheski pregled, Sofia, 32, Summer.
- Bakratcheva, A. (1999). Late 19th-Century Bulgarian Fiction in the Light of the European Novelistic Tradition (Българската следосвобожденска белетристика в светлината на европейската романова традиция) - In: Balgarskata myara v literaturata. Sofia: Balgarski pisatel, 3.
- Bakratcheva, A. (2000). Unitarianism in the Spiritual Tradition of American Transcendentalism (Унитариатството в духовната традиция на американския трансцендентализъм) - In: Filosofia, Sofia, 1.
- Bakratcheva, A. (2001). Life Without Principle. Selected Works of Henry David Thoreau - editor, introduction and comments (Живот без принцип. Избрани произведения от Хенри Дейвид Торо - съст., студия и коментар). Sofia: LIK Publishing House.
- Bakratcheva, A. (2001). Visibility Beyond the Visible. Preface. (Видимост отвъд видимото, предговор) - In: Life Without Principle. Selected Works of Henry David Thoreau. Sofia: LIK Publishing House.
- Bakratcheva, A. (2001). American Transcendentalism (Американският трансцендентализъм) - In: Kant and the Kantian Tradition in Bulgaria. Volume in Honor of the 100th Anniversary of Prof. Tzeko Torbov. Sofia: LIK Publishing House.
- Bakratcheva, A. (2001). Inspiration in the Aesthetical Vision of the American Transcendentalists (Вдъхновението във философско-естетическата система на американските трансценденталисти) - In: Filosofia, Sofia, 1.
- Bakratcheva, A. (2001). The Foundations of American Transcendentalism: Puritanism and 18th-Century Rationalism (Първоосновите на американския трансцендентализъм - пуританство и просвещенски рационализъм) - In: Filosofski forum, Sofia, III, Vol. 9, No. 1.
- Bakratcheva, A. (2003). Transcendentalism and Romanticism: Transatlantic Parallels (Трансцендентализъм и Романтизъм: трансатлантически ракурси) - In: Sledva, Sofia, Issue 6, August.
- Bakratcheva, A. (2004). Transatlantic Metamorphoses of Postkantianism: Ralph Waldo Emerson (Трансатлантическите преображения на посткантианската мисъл: Ралф Уолдо Емерсън) - In: Kant and the Dialogue of Traditions. Volume Dedicated to the 280th Anniversary of Immanuel Kant's Birth and the 200th Anniversary of his Death. Blagoevgrad: Neofit Rilski University Press.
- Bakratcheva, A. (2004). American Transcendentalism (Американският трансцендентализъм) - In: Media Times Review, Issue April.
- Bakratcheva, A. (2004). The Transatlantic Identity of the Transcendentalist (Трансатлантическата идентичност на трансценденталиста) - In: Literaturen vestnik, Sofia, 15, 14-20.4.
- Bakratcheva, A. (2004). The Poet-Priest: the Aesthetic Model for the American Transcendentalists (Поетът-проповедник: естетическият модел на американските трансценденталисти) - In: Ezik i Literatura, Sofia, 1-2.
- Bakratcheva, A. (2004). American Transcendentalism: Artistic/Religious Practice and Way of Life (Американският трансцендентализъм - художествено-религиозна практика и начин на живот) - In: Filosofia, Sofia, 2.
- Bakratcheva, A. (2004). The American 'Defense of Poetry' - Apotheosis of the American Poet (Американската 'Защита на поезията' - апотеоз на американския поет) - In: Foreign Language Teaching, Sofia, 4.
- Bakratcheva, A. (2005). Traditions and Individual Talent: Emerson and Thoreau (Традиции и индивидуален талант: Емерсън и Торо) - In: Ezik i Literatura, Sofia, 1-2.
- Bakratcheva, A. (2005). Mentorship as Vocation: Thoreau through the Eyes of Emerson (Менторството като призвание: Торо през погледа на Емерсън) - In: Filosofia, Sofia, 4.
- Bakratcheva, A. (2006). The Ecopoetic Thoreau (Екопоетичният Торо) - In: Ezik i Literatura, Sofia, 1-2.
- Bakratcheva, A. (2006). 'Walden': Thoreau's Artistic Harmony ('Уолдън': Художествената хармония на Хенри Дейвид Торо) - In: Sledva, Sofia, Issue 14, May.
- Bakratcheva, A. (2006). In the Harmony of a Sanctuary Preserved: Walden, Thoreau and 'Walden' (Сред хармониите на опазената святост: Уолдън, Торо и 'Уолдън') - In: Filosofia, Sofia, 4.
- Bakratcheva, A. (2007). Thoreau's 'Homeric Experiment' ('Омировският експеримент' на Хенри Дейвид Торо) - In: The Word - Ancient and Modern. Jubilee Conference of the Faculty of Classical and Modern Philology. Volume 1/2005, Edited by Svetlana Arnaudova. Sofia: St. Kliment Ohridski University Press.
- Bakratcheva, A. (2007). The Glamorous Burst of American Critical Thought: Margaret Fuller (Яркото зарево на американската критическа мисъл: Маргарет Фулър) - In: Ezik i Literatura, Sofia, 3-4.
- Bakratcheva, A. (2007). Visibility Beyond the Visible. The Artistic Discourse of American Transcendentalism (Видимост отвъд видимото. Художественият дискурс на американския трансцендентализъм). Sofia: New Bulgarian University Press.

=== Editorials and translations ===
- Patricia Highsmith: Deep Water. Novel. 1988
- Wole Soyinka: The Lion and the Jewel, The Swamp Dwellers, Death and the King's Horseman. Plays; "This Past Must Address Its Present", Nobel lecture, 1986 - In: Wole Soyinka: Eternal Cycle. 1989
- Henry David Thoreau: Walden. Civil Disobedience. 1993
- Henry David Thoreau: Life Without Principle. Selected Works. 2001, 2011
- The Unifying Aspects of Cultures. Frontier Metamorphoses: Americanization and Otherness - In: Trans Internet-Zeitschrift für Kulturwissenschaften 15.Nr, Mai 2004. Research Institute for Austrian and International Literature and Cultural Studies (INST) Vienna, Austria.
- Ralph Waldo Emerson: The Over-Soul. Selected Works. 2014
