= Safrira Zachai =

Israeli voice actress

- שפרירה זכאי
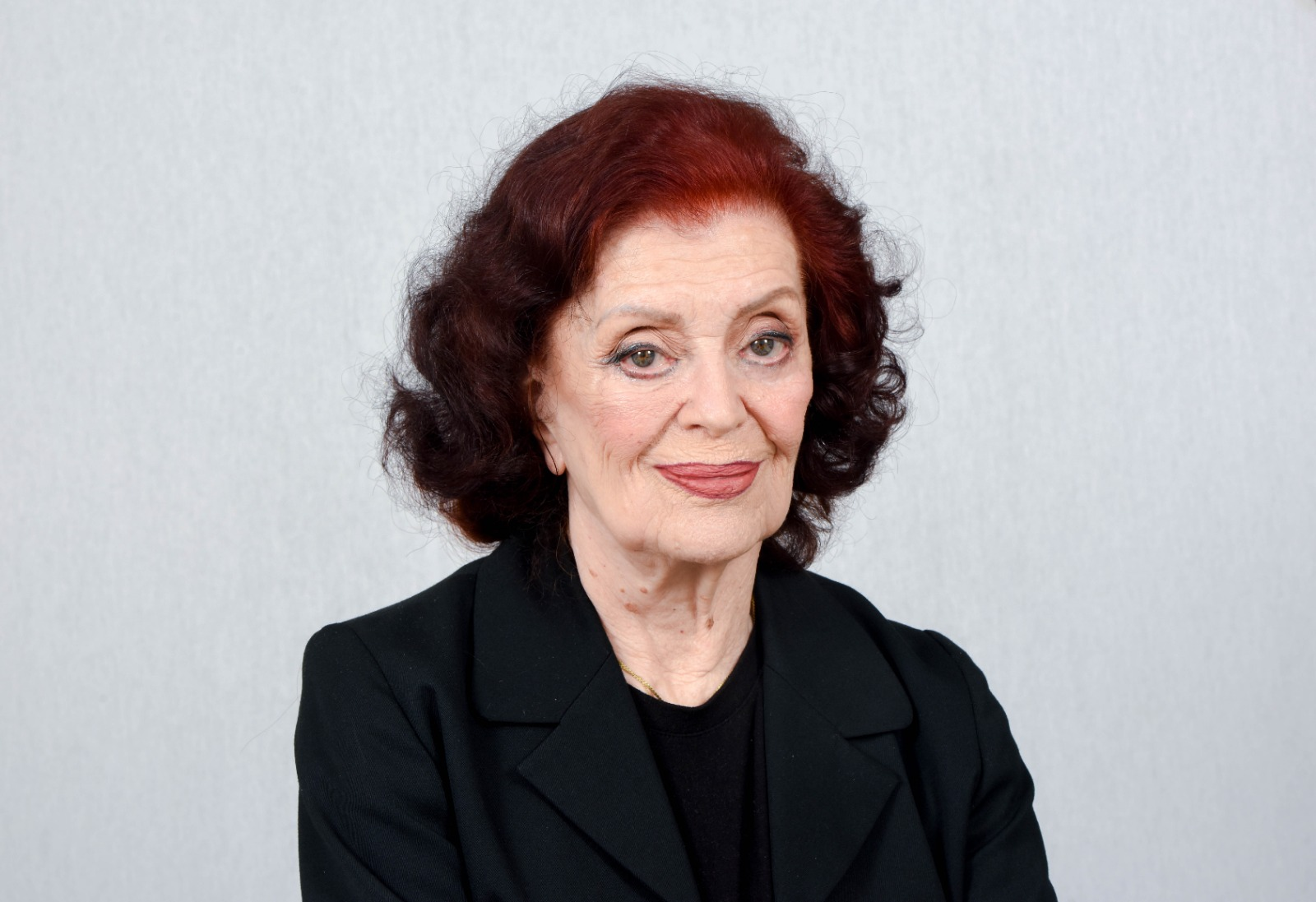
- Zachai in 2021
- Born: 13 September 1932 (age 93); Gedera, Mandatory Palestine
- Other names: Shafrira Zakai
- Occupations: Actress; voice actress; dubbing director; dubbing producer; narrator; journalist; translator
- Years active: 1947–present
- Spouse(s): Mati Raz (m. 19??; died. 2002)
- Children: 2

Safrira Zachai (Hebrew: שפרירה זכאי; born 13 September 1932) is an Israeli actress, voice actress, dubbing director and translator.
