= Midori Miura =

Japanese translator

- 三浦 みどり
- Born: 1947; Tokyo
- Died: 13 December 2012 (aged 64); Tokyo
- Other name: Midori Okui
- Occupation: Translator
- Spouse: Kyotaro Okui

Midori Miura (三浦 みどり, Miura Midori; 1947 – 13 December 2012) (real name Midori Okui (奥井 みどり, Okui Midori)) was a Japanese translator, best known for her translations of the works of modern Russian literature. She translated A Golden Cloudlet Was Sleeping by Anatoli Pristavkin (Japanese title コーカサスの金色の雲), The War Has Unfeminine Face and Zinc Boys by Svetlana Aleksiyevich and The Second Chechen War by Anna Politkovskaya in particular. Miura also translated into Russian Non-chan Kumo ni Noru (ノンちゃん雲に乗る) by Momoko Ishii.

Miura was an opponent of Russian military intervention in Chechnya.

Miura was born in Tokyo, and died of rectal cancer on 13 December 2012, aged 64, at her home in Tokyo.
