= Manjari Joshi =

Indian author, journalist and translator

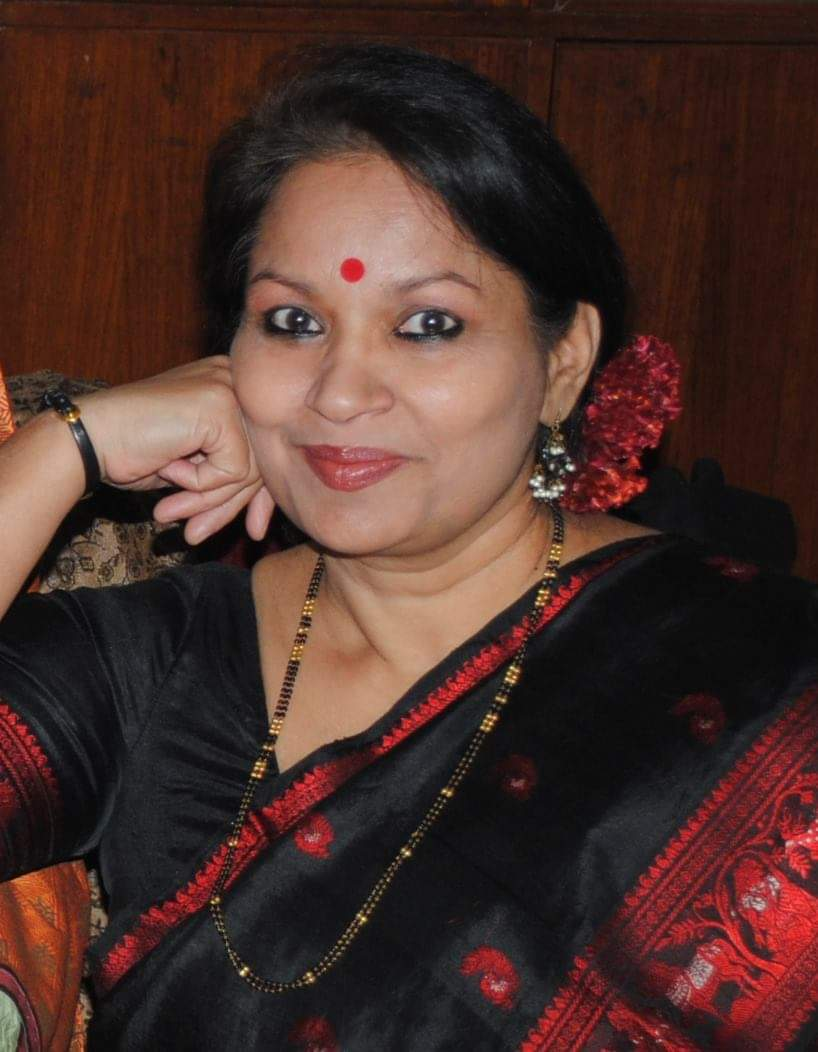
- Born: 19 March 1960 (age 66); Kanpur, Uttar Pradesh, India
- Occupations: Journalist, writer and translator
- Writing career
- Genres: Books, journalistic articles and reviews
- Notable work: "Bharatiya Sangeet Ki Parampara"

Manjari Joshi is a TV newsreader/anchor of the Indian public service broadcast television network Doordarshan.She is the daughter of famous Hindi poet and journalist Raghuvir Sahay.

== Career ==
Manjari got her schooling from Sardar Patel Vidyalaya, New Delhi. She pursued her graduation in Chemistry (Hons) from Miranda College of University of Delhi. She later turned towards Russian and received her post graduation from Jawaharlal Nehru University. She is a translator of Russian to English and Hindi. She has written articles for newspapers. She teaches television journalism.

== Bibliography ==
- Selected Works of Abai Kunnanbev (अबई कुनानबेव चयनिका) (1995), (Translations: Hem Chandra Pande, Variyam Singh, Manjari Joshi, Archana Upaddhyaya), Sahitya Academy, New Delhi ISBN 81-7201-815-0
- Bharatiya Sangeet ki Parampara (भारतीय संगीत की परंपरा) (2002), National Book Trust, New Delhi. ISBN 81-237-3985-0
- Writing for Media (2011), (co-author Hemant Joshi), Vikas Publishing House, New Delhi. ISBN 978-81-259-4866-7
- Fundamentals of Journalism and Mass Communication (2011), (co-author Prof. Hemant Joshi), Vikas Publishing House, New Delhi. ISBN 978-81-259-4807-0
- Communication for Development (2011), (co-author Hemant Joshi), Vikas Publishing House, New Delhi. ISBN 978-81-259-4817-9
