= Irina Negrea =

Romanian literary translator, journalist and editor

Irina Negrea (born 19 October 1952) is a Romanian literary translator, journalist and editor.

== Biography ==
Irina Negrea holds a M.A. at the University of Bucharest, majored in English, French and Latin language and literature. She specializes in literary translations from French and English language works into Romanian. Her other specialities include translation of non-fiction books (media, information and communication, reference/dictionaries, memoirs, history etc.).

She has translated more than sixty books which were published by Romanian publishing houses such as Humanitas publishing house, Rao, Editura Univers, Nemira, Art, Editura Paralela 45, Leda, Corint Junior, Vivaldi, Editura Curtea Veche, Litera, Lider, Editura Trei etc.

A freelance journalist and an editorial advisor for publishers, she was formerly a deputy chief editor of Cotidianul and a TV media advisor for the Romanian Television Corporation (Televiziunea Română).

She received the "Lucian Blaga" Literary Award for the translation in Romanian of the novel D'un château l'autre (Castle to Castle) by Louis-Ferdinand Céline.

She is a member of the Writers' Union of Romania.

== Works ==
=== Translations of Louis-Ferdinand Céline's novels ===
- Louis-Ferdinand Céline, Feerie pentru altă dată I; Feerie pentru alta dată II (Normance) (Féerie pour une autre fois I; Féerie pour une autre fois II – Normance), Editura Paralela 45, 2012
- Louis-Ferdinand Céline, Guignol's Band I și II (London's Bridge), Editura Paralela 45, 2009
- Louis-Ferdinand Céline, De la un castel la altul (D'un château l'autre), Nemira, 1996 and 2006 (reprint)
- Louis-Ferdinand Céline, Nord, Nemira, 2002 and 2010 (reprint)
- Louis-Ferdinand Céline, Rigodon, Nemira, 2002 and 2010 (reprint)

=== Other published translations (a selection) ===
- Tibor Fischer, Banda mintoșilor (The Thought Gang), Humanitas, 2006
- Nick Hornby, Turnul sinucigașilor (A Long Way Down), Humanitas, 2006 and 2014 (republished with the title Adio, dar mai stau puţin)
- Peter Mayle, Accept orice (Anything Considered), Humanitas, 2005
- Tim Lott, Învățăturile lui Don Juan (The Love Secrets of Don Juan), Humanitas, 2007
- Sarah Dunant, Nașterea lui Venus (The Birth of Venus), Humanitas, 2007
- Nigel Williams, Crimele din Wimbledon (The Wimbledon Trilogy), Humanitas, 2005
- Tibor Fischer, La genunchiul broaștei (Under the Frog), Humanitas, 2008
- Richard Ford, Cronicarul sportiv (The Sportswriter), Humanitas, 2006
- Marchizul de Custine, Scrisori din Rusia. Rusia în 1839 ( La Russie en 1839), Humanitas, 1991 and 2007 (reprint)
- Michael Sadler, Un englez amorezat. Dragostea în Franța profundă (An Englishman Amoureux: Love in Deepest France), Humanitas, 2012
- Granta 97: Best of Young American Novelists 2 (Antologia Granta: Kevin Brockmeier; Jonathan Safran Foer; Nicole Krauss; Karen Russell), Leda, 2009
- Tim Parks, Europa, Leda, 2010
- Jonathan Lethem, Orfani în Brooklyn (Motherless Brooklyn), Leda, 2011
- Kate Atkinson, Viața ca un joc de crochet (Human Croquet), Leda, 2013
- C. S. Lewis, Călătorie pe mare cu "Zori de Zi" (The Voyage of the Dawn Treader), RAO, 2000
- C. S. Lewis, Ultima bătălie (The Last Battle), RAO, 1999
- C. S. Lewis, Jilțul de argint (The Silver Chair), RAO, 1999
- Pat Alexander, Biblia pentru cei mici (The Lion First Bible), RAO, 1999
- Michel Faber, Petale de roșu și alb (The Crimson Petal and the White), Kobalt, 2007
- Stuart Kelly, Cartea cărților pierdute (The Book of Lost Books), Nemira, 2007
- Kimberley Cornish, Evreul din Linz (The Jew of Linz), Nemira, 2007
- John Banville, Atena (Athena), Nemira, 2008
- A. S. Byatt, Natură moartă (Still Life), Nemira, 2008
- Frédéric Rouvillois, Istoria snobismului (Histoire du snobisme), Nemira, 2010
- Francois Gresle, Michel Panoff, Michel Perrin, Pierre Tripier, "Dicționar de științe umane" ("Dictionnaire des sciences humaines"), Nemira, 2000
- Jean Cantos, Manuscrisul jupînului Godemer (Le manuscrit de maître Godemer), Nemira, 1997
- Wilkie Collins, Femeia în alb (The Woman in White), Lider, 2000
- Robert Ludlum, Compromisul (Trevayne), Lider
- Pierre Lorrain, Incredibila alianţă Rusia-Statele Unite (L'Incroyable alliance Russie – États-Unis), Editura Ştiinţelor Sociale şi Politice, 2003
- George R. R. Martin, Gardner Dozois, Daniel Abraham: Fuga vînătorului (Hunter's Run), Nemira, 2012
- Adele Faber, Elaine Mazlish, Comunicarea eficientă cu copiii (How to Talk so Kids Can Learn), Curtea Veche, 2002
- Joseph O'Connor, Steaua mărilor (Star of the Sea), Curtea Veche, 2005
- Iain Pears, Mîna lui Giotto (Giotto's Hand), Nemira, 2011
- Sophie Hannah, O păpușă sau alta (Little Face), Nemira, 2011
- Dorothy L. Sayers, Reclama ucigașă (Murder Must Advertise), Nemira, 2009
- Peter Carey, Parrot şi Olivier în America (Parrot and Olivier in America), Art, 2015
- Jean des Cars, Saga dinastiei de Habsburg: de la Sfântul Imperiu la Uniunea Europeană (La saga des Habsbourg. Du Saint Empire à l'Union européenne), Editura Trei, 2005
- Simon Sebag Montefiore, Discursuri care au schimbat lumea (Speeches That Changed the World), Editura Trei, 2015
- Jean des Cars, Sceptrul şi sângele: Regi şi regine în tumultul celor două Războaie mondiale (Le Sceptre et le sang. Rois et reines dans la tourmente des deux guerres mondiales), Editura Trei, 2016
- Scott Anderson, Lawrence în Arabia: război, mistificare, nesăbuinţă imperială şi crearea Orientului Mijlociu modern (Lawrence in Arabia. War, Deceit, Imperial Folly and the Making of the Modern Middle East), Editura Trei, 2016
- Dave Eggers, O hologramă pentru rege (A Hologram for the King), Humanitas Fiction, 2016
- Eleanor Catton, Luminătorii (The Luminaries), Art, 2016
- Richard Yates, Parada de Paşte (The Easter Parade), Litera, 2016
