= List of Harry Potter translations =

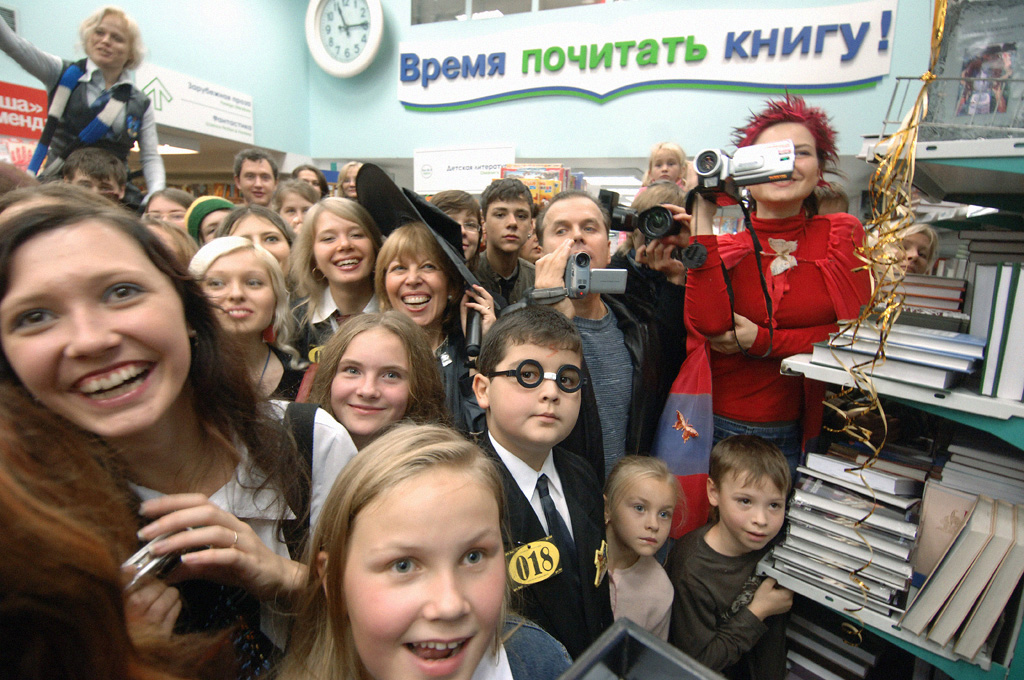
The Russian translation of The Deathly Hallows goes on sale in Moscow, 2007

The Harry Potter series of fantasy novels by J. K. Rowling is one of the most translated series of all time, being available in 85 languages. This includes languages with fewer than a million speakers such as Basque, Greenlandic, and Welsh, as well as the Classical languages Latin and Ancient Greek. Additionally, regional adaptations of the books have been made to accommodate regional dialects such as the American English edition and the Valencian adaptation of Catalan.

For reasons of secrecy, translations were only allowed to begin after each book had been published in English, creating a lag of several months for readers of other languages. Impatient fans in many places simply bought the book in English instead. Harry Potter and the Order of the Phoenix became the first English language book to top France's Livres Hebdo best-seller list since it began four years prior in 1999. In some cases, fans have created their own unofficial translations, either ahead of a licensed translation or when a licensed translation is unavailable.

Issues arising in the translation of Harry Potter include cultural references, riddles, anticipating future plot points, and Rowling's creative names for characters and other elements in the magical world which often involve word play and phonology.

== Translation process ==
For an authorised translation, the publisher must first negotiate and sign a contract with Rowling's agents, The Blair Partnership. The publishers select translators locally.

So as to prevent plots being leaked, translators were not granted access to the books before their official release date in English; hence, translation could start only after the English editions had been published, creating a lag of several months before the translations were made available. This necessary delay has boosted the sales of English-language editions of the books to impatient fans, in countries where English is not the first language. Such was the clamour to read the fifth book that its English edition became the first English-language book ever to top the bookseller list in France. In Italy, impatient Potter fans organised "Operation Feather", deluging the publisher Salani with feathers (reminiscent of Hogwarts' messenger owls) to demand expedited publication for the Italian translation of the seventh and final book in the series. This has also caused unauthorised translations and fake versions of the books to appear in many countries.

The high profile and demand for a high-quality local translation means that a great deal of care is often taken in the task. In some countries, such as Italy, the first book was revised by the publishers and issued in an updated edition in response to readers who complained about the quality of the first translation. In countries such as China and Portugal, the translation is conducted by a group of translators working together to save time. Some of the translators hired to work on the books were well known before their work on Harry Potter, such as Viktor Golyshev, who oversaw the Russian translation of the series' fifth book. Golyshev was renowned for his translations of William Faulkner and George Orwell, and was known to snub the Harry Potter books in interviews and refer to them as inferior literature. The Turkish translation of books two to five was undertaken by Sevin Okyay, a popular literary critic and cultural commentator.

In 2017, Bloomsbury celebrated the series' 20th anniversary with an announcement that it had been officially translated into 79 languages. Since 2017, Bloomsbury has published or licensed translations into Scots, Hawaiian, Belarusian, Kazakh, Yiddish, and Māori.

Some translations, such as those to the dead Latin and Ancient Greek languages, were done as academic exercises, to stimulate interest in the languages and to provide students of those languages with modern reading texts. The Ancient Greek version, according to the translator, is the longest text written in Ancient Greek since the novels of Heliodorus of Emesa in the 3rd century AD, and took about a year to complete.

== List of translations by language ==
The original British English versions of the book were published in the United Kingdom by Bloomsbury. Note that in some countries, such as Spain and India, the series has been translated into several local languages; sometimes the book has been translated into two dialects of the same language in two countries (for example, separate Portuguese versions for Brazil and Portugal).

Translations of the Harry Potter series
Language	Country	Publisher(s) and distributor(s)	Translator(s)	Title(s)
English (original version)	United Kingdom; Ireland; Australia; New Zealand; Canada; South Africa; India; Hong Kong; Malaysia; Philippines; Singapore; United States	UK/Ireland: Bloomsbury Publishing Australia/New Zealand: Allen & Unwin Canada: Bloomsbury/Raincoast Books (currently dist. through Penguin Books): South Africa: Jonathan Ball Publishers United States: Scholastic Corporation/Arthur A. Levine Books India: Bloomsbury Malaysia/Singapore/Philippines/Hong Kong: Scholastic Corporation		1. Harry Potter and the Philosopher's Stone Harry Potter and the Sorcerer's Stone (US); 2. Harry Potter and the Chamber of Secrets; 3. Harry Potter and the Prisoner of Azkaban; 4. Harry Potter and the Goblet of Fire; 5. Harry Potter and the Order of the Phoenix; 6. Harry Potter and the Half-Blood Prince; 7. Harry Potter and the Deathly Hallows
Afrikaans	South Africa	Human & Rousseau (pty) Ltd.	1. Janie Oosthuysen (I-V); 2. Kobus Geldenhuys (VI-VII)	1. Harry Potter en die Towenaar se Steen; 2. Harry Potter en die Kamer van Geheimenisse; 3. Harry Potter en die Gevangene van Azkaban; 4. Harry Potter en die Beker Vol Vuur; 5. Harry Potter en die Orde van die Feniks; 6. Harry Potter en die Halfbloed Prins; 7. Harry Potter en die Skatte van die Dood
Albanian	Albania; Kosovo	Publishing House Dituria	Amik Kasoruho	1. Harry Potter dhe Guri Filozofal; 2. Harry Potter dhe Dhoma e të Fshehtave; 3. Harry Potter dhe i Burgosuri i Azkabanit; 4. Harry Potter dhe Kupa e Zjarrit; 5. Harry Potter dhe Urdhri i Feniksit; 6. Harry Potter dhe Princi Gjakpërzier; 7. Harry Potter dhe Dhuratat e Vdekjes
Arabic	(Arab League) Arab world (Translation origin: Egypt)	Nahdet Misr	Sahar Jabr Mahmūd (I, VI ed., VII); Rajā' 'Abdullah (II, III ed.); Ahmad Hasan Muhammad (III, IV); Translation and Publication Department of Nahdet Misr (V); Dr. 'Abdulwahāb 'Allūb (VI)	1. هاري بوتر وحجر الفيلسوف; 2. هاري بوتر وحجرة الأسرار; 3. هاري بوتر وسجين أزكابان; 4. هاري بوتر وكأس النار; 5. هاري بوتر وجماعة العنقاء; 6. هاري بوتر والأمير الهجين; 7. هاري بوتر ومقدسات الموت
Armenian	Armenia	Zangak	1. Alvard Jivanyan	1. Հարրի Փոթերը և Փիլիսոփայական քարը 2. Հարրի Փոթերը և Գաղտնիքների սենյակը 3. Հարրի Փոթերը և Ազքաբանի կալանավորը 4. Հարրի Փոթերը և Կրակի գավաթը 5. Հարրի Փոթերը և Փյունիկի միաբանությունը 6. Հարրի Փոթերը և Կիսարյուն արքայազնը
Asturian	Spain (Asturias)	Trabe	Xesús González Rato	1. Harry Potter y la piedra filosofal
Azerbaijani	Azerbaijan	Qanun	1. Fəxrəddin Ağazadə (I); 2. Kifayət Haqverdiyeva (II); 3. Fərid Hüseynli (III); 4. Gülmira Fətullayeva (IV); 5. Nərmin İskəndər (V–VII)	1. Harri Potter və fəlsəfə daşı 2. Harri Potter və sirlər otağı 3. Harri Potter və Azkaban məhbusu 4. Harri Potter və alov qədəhi 5. Harri Potter və si̇murq ordeni̇; 6. Harri Potter və yarimqan pri̇ns 7. Harri Potter və ölüm yadigarları
Basque	Basque Country, i.e.: Spain; France	Elkarlanean	Iñaki Mendiguren (I-VII)	1. Harry Potter eta sorgin-harria 2. Harry Potter eta sekretuen ganbera 3. Harry Potter eta Azkabango presoa 4. Harry Potter eta Suaren kopa 5. Harry Potter eta Fenixaren Ordena; 6. Harry Potter eta Odol Nahasiko Printzea; 7. Harry Potter eta Herioaren erlikiak
Belarusian	Belarus	Januskevic	Alena Piatrovič	1. Гары Потэр і філасофскі камень 2. Гары Потэр і таемная зала 3. Гары Потэр і вязень Азкабана; 4. Гары Потэр і Келіх агню
Bengali	Bangladesh; India	Ankur Prakashani	1. Sohrab Hasan and Shehabuddin Ahmed (I); 2. Muniruzzaman (II–III); 3. Asim Chowdhury (IV–VI); 4. Mohsin Habib (VII)	1. হ্যারি পটার এন্ড দ্য ফিলোসফার্স স্টোন; 2. হ্যারি পটার এন্ড দ্য চেম্বার অব সিক্রেটস; 3. হ্যারি পটার এন্ড দ্য প্রিজনার অব আজকাবান; 4. হ্যারি পটার এন্ড দ্য গবলেট অব ফায়ার; 5. হ্যারি পটার এন্ড দি অর্ডার অব দ্য ফিনিক্স; 6. হ্যারি পটার এন্ড দ্য হাফ ব্লাড প্রিন্স; 7. হ্যারি পটার এন্ড দ্য ডেথলি হ্যালোজ
Bosnian	Bosnia and Herzegovina	Buybook	Mirjana Evtov	1. Harry Potter i kamen mudrosti 2. Harry Potter i odaja tajni 3. Harry Potter i zatvorenik Azkabana; 4. Harry Potter i plameni pehar 5. Harry Potter i Red feniksa 6. Harry Potter i princ poluplave krvi 7. Harry Potter i kobne moći
Breton	France (Brittany)	An Amzer	1. Mark Kerrain	1. Harry Potter ha Maen ar Furien; 2. Harry Potter ha Kambr ar Sekredoù
Bulgarian	Bulgaria	Egmont Group	1. Teodora Dzhebarova (I); 2. Mariana Ekimova-Melnishka (II-IV); 3. Emiliya L. Maslarova (V–VII)	1. Хари Потър и Философският камък 2. Хари Потър и Стаята на тайните 3. Хари Потър и Затворникът от Азкабан; 4. Хари Потър и Огненият бокал 5. Хари Потър и Орденът на феникса 6. Хари Потър и Нечистокръвния принц 7. Хари Потър и Даровете на Смъртта
Catalan	Andorra; Spain; Balearic Islands, Catalonia; Valencia; Italy; Sardinia (Alghero)	1. Editorial Empúries; 2. Tàndem Edicions, S.L.: Valencian adaptation of I and II	1. Laura Escorihuela Martínez(I–IV); 2. Xavier Pàmies Giménez(V–VII)	1. Harry Potter i la pedra filosofal 2. Harry Potter i la cambra secreta 3. Harry Potter i el pres d'Azkaban; 4. Harry Potter i el calze de foc 5. Harry Potter i l'orde del Fènix; 6. Harry Potter i el misteri del Príncep; 7. Harry Potter i les relíquies de la Mort
Chinese (Simplified)	China	People's Literature Publishing House (人民文学出版社);	1. Su Nong (苏农) (I) (Note: The name "Su Nong" is a blend of two translators' names: Cao Suling and Ma Ainong. Cao Suling began translating the book but pulled out of the project and Ma Ainong took over.); 2. Cao Suling (曹苏玲) (I); 3. Ma Aixin (马爱新) (II, IV, V); 4. Zheng Xumi (郑须弥) (III); 5. Ma Ainong (马爱农) (I, V); 6. Cai Wen (蔡文) (V)	1. 哈利·波特与魔法石; 2. 哈利·波特与密室; 3. 哈利·波特与阿兹卡班的囚徒; 4. 哈利·波特与火焰杯; 5. 哈利·波特与凤凰社; 6. 哈利·波特与"混血王子"; 7. 哈利·波特与死亡圣器
Chinese (Traditional)	Taiwan; Hong Kong; Macau	Crown Publishing Company Ltd (皇冠出版社)	1. Peng Chien-Wen (彭倩文; Peng Qianwen) (I-IV); 2. Crown Editor and Translator Group (皇冠編譯組; Huangguan Bianyi Zu) (V–VII)	1. 哈利波特—神秘的魔法石; 2. 哈利波特—消失的密室; 3. 哈利波特—阿茲卡班的逃犯; 4. 哈利波特—火盃的考驗; 5. 哈利波特—鳳凰會的密令; 6. 哈利波特—混血王子的背叛; 7. 哈利波特—死神的聖物
Croatian	Croatia	first translation		1. Harry Potter i Kamen mudraca 2. Harry Potter i Odaja tajni 3. Harry Potter i Zatočenik Azkabana; 4. Harry Potter i Plameni Pehar; 5. Harry Potter i Red feniksa 6. Harry Potter i Princ miješane krvi 7. Harry Potter i Darovi smrti
Croatian	Croatia	Algoritam	1. Zlatko Crnković (I–III); 2. Dubravka Petrović (IV–VII)	1. Harry Potter i Kamen mudraca 2. Harry Potter i Odaja tajni 3. Harry Potter i Zatočenik Azkabana; 4. Harry Potter i Plameni Pehar; 5. Harry Potter i Red feniksa 6. Harry Potter i Princ miješane krvi 7. Harry Potter i Darovi smrti
Croatian	Croatia	second translation		1. Harry Potter i Kamen mudraca 2. Harry Potter i Odaja tajni 3. Harry Potter i Zatočenik Azkabana; 4. Harry Potter i Plameni Pehar; 5. Harry Potter i Red feniksa 6. Harry Potter i Princ miješane krvi 7. Harry Potter i Darovi smrti
Croatian	Croatia	Mozaik knjiga	1. Dubravka Petrović (I-VII)	1. Harry Potter i Kamen mudraca 2. Harry Potter i Odaja tajni 3. Harry Potter i Zatočenik Azkabana; 4. Harry Potter i Plameni Pehar; 5. Harry Potter i Red feniksa 6. Harry Potter i Princ miješane krvi 7. Harry Potter i Darovi smrti
Czech	Czech Republic	Albatros	1. Vladimír Medek (I, II, IV); 2. Pavel Medek (III, V, VI, VII)	1. Harry Potter a kámen mudrců 2. Harry Potter a tajemná komnata 3. Harry Potter a vězeň z Azkabanu; 4. Harry Potter a ohnivý pohár 5. Harry Potter a Fénixův řád 6. Harry Potter a princ dvojí krve 7. Harry Potter a relikvie smrti
Danish	Denmark	Gyldendal	Hanna Lützen	1. Harry Potter og De Vises Sten; 2. Harry Potter og Hemmelighedernes Kammer; 3. Harry Potter og Fangen fra Azkaban; 4. Harry Potter og Flammernes Pokal; 5. Harry Potter og Føniksordenen; 6. Harry Potter og Halvblodsprinsen; 7. Harry Potter og Dødsregalierne
Dutch	Belgium (Flanders); Netherlands; Suriname	Standaard Uitgeverij / Uitgeverij De Harmonie	Wiebe Buddingh'	1. Harry Potter en de Steen der Wijzen; 2. Harry Potter en de Geheime Kamer; 3. Harry Potter en de Gevangene van Azkaban; 4. Harry Potter en de Vuurbeker; 5. Harry Potter en de Orde van de Feniks; 6. Harry Potter en de Halfbloed Prins; 7. Harry Potter en de Relieken van de Dood
Estonian	Estonia	Varrak Publishers	1. Krista Kaer (I-VII); 2. Kaisa Kaer (II-VII)	1. Harry Potter ja tarkade kivi 2. Harry Potter ja saladuste kamber 3. Harry Potter ja Azkabani vang 4. Harry Potter ja tulepeeker 5. Harry Potter ja Fööniksi Ordu; 6. Harry Potter ja segavereline prints 7. Harry Potter ja surma vägised
Faroese	Faroe Islands	Bókadeild Føroya Lærarafelags	1. Gunnar Hoydal (I–III); 2. Malan Háberg (IV); 3. Bergur Rasmussen (V–VI)	1. Harry Potter og Vitramannasteinurin; 2. Harry Potter og Kamarið Við Loynidómum; 3. Harry Potter og Fangin Úr Azkaban; 4. Harry Potter og Eldbikarið; 5. Harry Potter og Føniksfylkingin; 6. Harry Potter og Hálvblóðsprinsurin; 7. Harry Potter og Arvalutir Deyðans
Filipino	Philippines	Lampara Books	Becky Bravo	1. Harry Potter and the Sorcerer's Stone: The Filipino Edition
Finnish	Finland	Tammi	Jaana Kapari-Jatta	1. Harry Potter ja viisasten kivi 2. Harry Potter ja salaisuuksien kammio 3. Harry Potter ja Azkabanin vanki 4. Harry Potter ja liekehtivä pikari 5. Harry Potter ja Feeniksin kilta 6. Harry Potter ja Puoliverinen prinssi 7. Harry Potter ja Kuoleman varjelukset
French	Belgium (Wallonia); Canada; France; Monaco; Switzerland; Luxembourg	Éditions Gallimard	Jean-François Ménard (plus the school books)	1. Harry Potter à l'école des sorciers 2. Harry Potter et la Chambre des secrets 3. Harry Potter et le Prisonnier d'Azkaban; 4. Harry Potter et la Coupe de feu 5. Harry Potter et l'Ordre du phénix 6. Harry Potter et le Prince de sang-mêlé 7. Harry Potter et les Reliques de la Mort
West Frisian	Netherlands (Friesland)	Uitgeverij Bornmeer	Jetske Bilker	1. Harry Potter en de stien fan 'e wizen
Galician	Spain (Galicia)	Editorial Galaxia	1. Marilar Aleixandre (I); 2. Eva Almazán (II-IV); 3. Laura Sáez (V, VII); 4. Carlos Acevedo (VI)	1. Harry Potter e a pedra filosofal 2. Harry Potter e a Cámara dos Segredos; 3. Harry Potter e o preso de Azkaban; 4. Harry Potter e o Cáliz de fogo 5. Harry Potter e a Orde do Fénix; 6. Harry Potter e o misterio do príncipe 7. Harry Potter e as reliquias da morte
Georgian	Georgia	Bakur Sulakauri Publishing	1. Manana Antadze (I); 2. Davit Gabunia (II, III); 3. Ketevan Kanchashvili (IV, VI); 4. Irakli Beriashvili (V); 5. Tsitso Khotsuashvili (VII)	1. ჰარი პოტერი და ფილოსოფიური ქვა 2. ჰარი პოტერი და საიდუმლო ოთახი 3. ჰარი პოტერი და აზკაბანის ტყვე 4. ჰარი პოტერი და ცეცხლოვანი თასი 5. ჰარი პოტერი და ფენიქსის ორდენი 6. ჰარი პოტერი და ნახევარპრინცი 7. ჰარი პოტერი და სიკვდილის საჩუქრები
German	Austria; Germany; Liechtenstein; Switzerland; Luxembourg	Carlsen Verlag	Klaus Fritz	1. Harry Potter und der Stein der Weisen; 2. Harry Potter und die Kammer des Schreckens; 3. Harry Potter und der Gefangene von Askaban; 4. Harry Potter und der Feuerkelch; 5. Harry Potter und der Orden des Phönix; 6. Harry Potter und der Halbblutprinz; 7. Harry Potter und die Heiligtümer des Todes
Low German	Germany	Verlag Michael Jung	1. Hartmut Cyriacks (I-II); 2. Peter Nissen (I-II); 3. Reinhard Goltz (II)	1. Harry Potter un de Wunnersteen; 2. Harry Potter un de grulig Kamer
Ancient Greek		Bloomsbury	Andrew Wilson (I)	1. Ἅρειος Ποτὴρ καὶ ἡ τοῦ φιλοσόφου λίθος
Modern Greek	Greece; Cyprus	Psichogios Publications	1. Máia Roútsou (I); 2. Kaíti Oikonómou (II-VII)	1. Ο Χάρι Πότερ και η Φιλοσοφική Λίθος; 2. Ο Χάρι Πότερ και η Κάμαρα με τα Μυστικά; 3. Ο Χάρι Πότερ και ο Αιχμάλωτος του Αζκαμπάν; 4. Ο Χάρι Πότερ και το Κύπελλο της Φωτιάς; 5. Ο Χάρι Πότερ και το Τάγμα του Φοίνικα; 6. Ο Χάρι Πότερ και ο Ημίαιμος Πρίγκηψ; 7. Ο Χάρι Πότερ και οι Κλήροι του Θανάτου
Greenlandic	Greenland	Atuakkiorfik Greenland Publishers	Stephen Hammeken	1. Harry Potter ujarallu inuunartoq
Gujarati	India (Gujarat)	Manjul Publishing House Pvt. Ltd.	Jagruti Trivedi	1. હૅરી પૉટર અને પારસમણિ (Note: It appears more common that Harry Potter is translated as હેરી પોટર in Gujarati (different vowels) however the published book clearly uses 'chandra e' as written here)
Hawaiian	United States (Hawaii)	Evertype	R. Keao NeSmith	1. Harry Potter a Me Ka Pōhaku Akeakamai
Hebrew	Israel	Miskal Ltd. (Yedioth Ahronoth and Sifrey Hemed) / Books in the Attic Ltd.	Gili Bar-Hillel	1. הארי פוטר ואבן החכמים; 2. הארי פוטר וחדר הסודות; 3. הארי פוטר והאסיר מאזקבאן; 4. הארי פוטר וגביע האש; 5. הארי פוטר ומסדר עוף החול; 6. הארי פוטר והנסיך חצוי־הדם; 7. הארי פוטר ואוצרות המוות
Hindi	India	Manjul Publishing House Pvt. Ltd.	Sudhir Dixit (I-VII)	1. हैरी पॉटर और पारस पत्थर; 2. हैरी पॉटर और रहस्यमयी तहख़ाना; 3. हैरी पॉटर और अज़्काबान का क़ैदी; 4. हैरी पॉटर और आग का प्याला; 5. हैरी पॉटर और मायापंछी का समूह; 6. हैरी पॉटर और हाफ़-ब्लड प्रिंस; 7. हैरी पॉटर और मौत के तोहफे
Hungarian	Hungary	Animus Publishing	Tóth Tamás Boldizsár	1. Harry Potter és a bölcsek köve 2. Harry Potter és a Titkok Kamrája; 3. Harry Potter és az azkabani fogoly 4. Harry Potter és a Tűz Serlege; 5. Harry Potter és a Főnix Rendje; 6. Harry Potter és a Félvér Herceg; 7. Harry Potter és a Halál ereklyéi
Icelandic	Iceland	Bjartur	1. Helga Haraldsdóttir (I-VII); 2. Jón Hallur Stefánsson (V)	1. Harry Potter og viskusteinninn 2. Harry Potter og leyniklefinn 3. Harry Potter og fanginn frá Azkaban; 4. Harry Potter og eldbikarinn 5. Harry Potter og Fönixreglan; 6. Harry Potter og Blendingsprinsinn; 7. Harry Potter og Dauðadjásnin
Indonesian	Indonesia	Kompas Gramedia Group	Listiana Srisanti (I-VII)	1. Harry Potter dan Batu Bertuah; 2. Harry Potter dan Kamar Rahasia; 3. Harry Potter dan Tawanan Azkaban; 4. Harry Potter dan Piala Api; 5. Harry Potter dan Orde Phoenix; 6. Harry Potter dan Pangeran Berdarah-Campuran; 7. Harry Potter dan Relikui Kematian
Irish	Ireland; United Kingdom	Bloomsbury	Máire Nic Mhaoláin (I)	1. Harry Potter agus an Órchloch
Italian	Italy; San Marino; Switzerland	Adriano Salani Editore	1. Marina Astrologo (I-II); 2. Beatrice Masini (III-VII); Illustrated by Serena Riglietti	1. Harry Potter e la pietra filosofale 2. Harry Potter e la camera dei segreti 3. Harry Potter e il prigioniero di Azkaban; 4. Harry Potter e il calice di fuoco 5. Harry Potter e l'Ordine della Fenice; 6. Harry Potter e il principe mezzosangue 7. Harry Potter e i Doni della Morte
Japanese	Japan	Say-zan-sha Publications Ltd.	Yuko Matsuoka (松岡 佑子, Matsuoka Yūko)	1. Harī Pottā to Kenja no Ishi (ハリー・ポッターと賢者の石); 2. Harī Pottā to Himitsu no Heya (ハリー・ポッターと秘密の部屋); 3. Harī Pottā to Azukaban no Shūjin (ハリー・ポッターとアズカバンの囚人); 4. Harī Pottā to Honō no Goburetto (ハリー・ポッターと炎のゴブレット); 5. Harī Pottā to Fushichō no Kishitan (ハリー・ポッターと不死鳥の騎士団); 6. Harī Pottā to Nazo no Purinsu (ハリー・ポッターと謎のプリンス); 7. Harī Pottā to Shi no Hihō (ハリー・ポッターと死の秘宝)
Khmer	Cambodia	Cambodia Daily Press	Un Tim	1. ហេរី ផោតធ័រ និង សិលាទេព; 2. ហេរី ផោតធ័រ និង បន្ទប់ សម្ងាត់
Kazakh	Kazakhstan	Steppe & World	Nazgul Kozhabek (Editor) (I-VII); Dinara Mazen (I-VII); Sayat Mukhamediyar (I, III-V, VII); Narkez Berikkazy(I)	1. Хәрри Поттер мен пәлсапа тас 2. Хәрри Поттер мен жасырын бөлме 3. Хәрри Поттер мен Азкабан тұтқыны 4. Хәрри Поттер мен от сауыт 5. Хәрри Поттер мен Феникс алқасы 6. Хәрри Поттер мен шалақан ханзада 7. Хәрри Поттер мен Ажал сыйлары
Korean	South Korea	Moonhak Soochup Publishing Co.	first translation	1. 해리 포터와 마법사의 돌 2. 해리 포터와 비밀의 방 3. 해리 포터와 아즈카반의 죄수; 4. 해리 포터와 불의 잔 5. 해리 포터와 불사조 기사단; 6. 해리 포터와 혼혈 왕자; 7. 해리 포터와 죽음의 성물
Korean	South Korea	Moonhak Soochup Publishing Co.	1. Hye-won Kim (I-IV (Note: Moonhak's website is inconsistent with the translator of Goblet of Fire; some editions have just Kim, some have just Choi, some have both. Until it is clarified it seems most likely that it was a collaboration and some listings of the book only included one of the translators.)); 2. In-ja Choi (IV–VII)	1. 해리 포터와 마법사의 돌 2. 해리 포터와 비밀의 방 3. 해리 포터와 아즈카반의 죄수; 4. 해리 포터와 불의 잔 5. 해리 포터와 불사조 기사단; 6. 해리 포터와 혼혈 왕자; 7. 해리 포터와 죽음의 성물
Korean	South Korea	Moonhak Soochup Publishing Co.	second translation	1. 해리 포터와 마법사의 돌 2. 해리 포터와 비밀의 방 3. 해리 포터와 아즈카반의 죄수; 4. 해리 포터와 불의 잔 5. 해리 포터와 불사조 기사단; 6. 해리 포터와 혼혈 왕자; 7. 해리 포터와 죽음의 성물
Korean	South Korea	Moonhak Soochup Publishing Co.	1. Donghyuk Kang	1. 해리 포터와 마법사의 돌 2. 해리 포터와 비밀의 방 3. 해리 포터와 아즈카반의 죄수; 4. 해리 포터와 불의 잔 5. 해리 포터와 불사조 기사단; 6. 해리 포터와 혼혈 왕자; 7. 해리 포터와 죽음의 성물
Latin		Bloomsbury	Peter Needham (I-II)	1. Harrius Potter et Philosophi Lapis; 2. Harrius Potter et Camera Secretorum
Latvian	Latvia	Jumava	1. Ingus Josts (I–VII); 2. Ieva Kolmane (IV–VII); 3. Sabīne Ozola (V, VII); 4. Māra Poļakova (V, VII)	1. Harijs Poters un Filozofu akmens 2. Harijs Poters un Noslēpumu kambaris 3. Harijs Poters un Azkabanas gūsteknis 4. Harijs Poters un Uguns biķeris 5. Harijs Poters un Fēniksa Ordenis; 6. Harijs Poters un Jauktasiņu princis 7. Harijs Poters un Nāves dāvesti
Lithuanian	Lithuania	Alma littera	Zita Marienė	1. Haris Poteris ir Išminties akmuo 2. Haris Poteris ir Paslapčių kambarys 3. Haris Poteris ir Azkabano kalinys 4. Haris Poteris ir Ugnies taurė 5. Haris Poteris ir Fenikso Brolija; 6. Haris Poteris ir Netikras Princas; 7. Haris Poteris ir Mirties relikvijos
Luxembourgish	Luxembourg	Kairos Edition	Florence Berg (I-II) Guy Berg (II)	1. Den Harry Potter an den Alchimistesteen; 2. Den Harry Potter an dem Salazar säi Sall
Macedonian	North Macedonia	first translation		1. Хари Потер и Каменот на мудроста 2. Хари Потер и Одајата на тајните 3. Хари Потер и Затвореникот од Азкабан; 4. Хари Потер и Пламениот пехар 5. Хари Потер и Редот на фениксот 6. Хари Потер и Полукрвниот Принц; 7. Хари Потер и Реликвиите на смртта
Macedonian	North Macedonia	Publishing House Kultura (I-V) Mladinska kniga Skopje (VI-VII)	1. Blagorodna Bogeska-Ančevska (I-III); 2. Oliver Jordanovski; 3. Lavinija Shuvaka (VI-VII)	1. Хари Потер и Каменот на мудроста 2. Хари Потер и Одајата на тајните 3. Хари Потер и Затвореникот од Азкабан; 4. Хари Потер и Пламениот пехар 5. Хари Потер и Редот на фениксот 6. Хари Потер и Полукрвниот Принц; 7. Хари Потер и Реликвиите на смртта
Macedonian	North Macedonia	second translation		1. Хари Потер и Каменот на мудроста 2. Хари Потер и Одајата на тајните 3. Хари Потер и Затвореникот од Азкабан; 4. Хари Потер и Пламениот пехар 5. Хари Потер и Редот на фениксот 6. Хари Потер и Полукрвниот Принц; 7. Хари Потер и Реликвиите на смртта
Macedonian	North Macedonia	libi (sub. of Ars Lamina) (I) Ars Libris (sub. of Ars Lamina) (II-V)	1. Vladimir Stojanovski (I, III-V); 2. Igor Kotevski (II, VI-VII)	1. Хари Потер и Каменот на мудроста 2. Хари Потер и Одајата на тајните 3. Хари Потер и Затвореникот од Азкабан; 4. Хари Потер и Пламениот пехар 5. Хари Потер и Редот на фениксот 6. Хари Потер и Полукрвниот Принц; 7. Хари Потер и Реликвиите на смртта
Malay	Malaysia	Pelangi Books		1. Harry Potter dengan Batu Hikmat; 2. Harry Potter dan Bilik Rahsia; 3. Harry Potter dengan Banduan Azkaban; 4. Harry Potter dalam Piala Api; 5. Harry Potter dalam Kumpulan Phoenix; 6. Harry Potter dengan Putera Berdarah Kacukan; 7. Harry Potter dengan Azimat Maut
Malayalam	India (Kerala)	Manjul Publishing House Pvt. Ltd.	1. Radhika C. Nair(I); 2. A.V. Harisankar(II)	1. ഹാരിപോട്ടർ രസായനക്കല്ല് [hāripōṭṭar rasāyanakkallŭ]; 2. ഹാരിപോട്ടർ നിഗൂഢനിലവറ [hāripōṭṭar nigūḍhanilavaṟa]
Māori	New Zealand	Auckland University Press	1. Leon Blake (I-II); 2. Donovan Te Ahunui Farnham (II); 3. Helen Parker (II); 4. Paiheretia Aperahama (II); 5. Te Aorangi Murphy-Fell (II)	1. Hare Pota me te Whatu Manapou; 2. Hare Pota me te Pakohu Kura Huna
Marathi	India	Manjul Publishing House Pvt. Ltd.	1. Bal Urdhwareshe (I); 2. Manjusha Amdekar (II, IV, V, VI); 3. Priyanka Kulkarni (III)	1. हॅरी पॉटर आणि परीस; 2. हॅरी पॉटर आणि रहस्यमय तळघर; 3. हॅरी पॉटर आणि अझ्कबानचा कैदी; 4. हॅरी पॉटर आणि अग्निचषक; 5. हॅरी पॉटर आणि फिनिक्स सेना; 6. हॅरी पॉटर आणि हाफ-ब्लड प्रिन्स; 7. हॅरी पॉटर आणि मृत्युदेवतेच्या भेटी
Mongolian	Mongolia	first translation		
Mongolian	Mongolia	Nepko Publishing	Д.Аюуш & Д.Батбаяр	1. Харри Поттер ба Шидэт Чулуу; 2. Харри Поттер ба Нууцат Өрөө
Mongolian	Mongolia	second translation		
Mongolian	Mongolia	Monsudar	Н. Энхнаран	1. Харри Поттер ба Философийн Чулуу; 2. Харри Поттер ба Нууцат Өрөө; 3. Харри Поттер ба Азкабаны Хоригдол; 4. Харри Поттер ба Галт Цом; 5. Харри Поттер ба Галт Шувууны Бүлгэм; 6. Харри Поттер ба Эрлийз Хунтайж; 7. Харри Поттер ба Үхлийн Шүтээн
Nepali	Nepal	Sunbird Publishing House	1. Shlesha Thapaliya; 2. Bijaya Adhikari	1. ह्यारी पोटर र पारसमणि
Norwegian Bokmål	Norway	N. W. Damm & Søn	Torstein Bugge Høverstad	1. Harry Potter og de vises stein 2. Harry Potter og Mysteriekammeret; 3. Harry Potter og fangen fra Azkaban; 4. Harry Potter og ildbegeret 5. Harry Potter og Føniksordenen; 6. Harry Potter og Halvblodsprinsen; 7. Harry Potter og dødstalismanene
Occitan	France; Occitania; Spain; Catalonia	Per Noste Edicions	1. Karina Richard Bòrdanava (I); 2. Patric Guilhemjoan (II)	1. Harry Potter e la pèira filosofau 2. Harry Potter e la crampa deus secrets
Persian	Iran	Tandis Books	1. Saeed Kobraiai (I); 2. Vida Eslamieh (II-VII)	1. هری پاتر و سنگ جادو; 2. هری پاتر و حفره اسرارآمیز; 3. هری پاتر و زندانی آزکابان; 4. هری پاتر و جام آتش; 5. هری پاتر و محفل ققنوس; 6. هری پاتر و شاهزاده دورگه; 7. هری پاتر و یادگاران مرگ
Polish	Poland	Media Rodzina	Andrzej Polkowski	1. Harry Potter i Kamień Filozoficzny; 2. Harry Potter i Komnata Tajemnic; 3. Harry Potter i więzień Azkabanu; 4. Harry Potter i Czara Ognia; 5. Harry Potter i Zakon Feniksa; 6. Harry Potter i Książę Półkrwi; 7. Harry Potter i Insygnia Śmierci
European Portuguese	Portugal	Editorial Presença	1. Isabel Fraga (I–IV); 2. Isabel Nunes (III–VI); 3. Manuela Madureira (IV–VII); 4. Alice Rocha (V–VII); 5. Maria do Carmo Figueira (V, VI); 6. Maria Georgina Segurado (VII)	1. Harry Potter e a Pedra Filosofal; 2. Harry Potter e a Câmara dos Segredos; 3. Harry Potter e o Prisioneiro de Azkaban; 4. Harry Potter e o Cálice de Fogo; 5. Harry Potter e a Ordem da Fénix; 6. Harry Potter e o Príncipe Misterioso; 7. Harry Potter e os Talismãs da Morte
Brazilian Portuguese	Brazil	Editora Rocco Ltda.	Lia Wyler	1. Harry Potter e a Pedra Filosofal; 2. Harry Potter e a Câmara Secreta; 3. Harry Potter e o Prisioneiro de Azkaban; 4. Harry Potter e o Cálice de Fogo; 5. Harry Potter e a Ordem da Fênix; 6. Harry Potter e o Enigma do Príncipe; 7. Harry Potter e as Relíquias da Morte
Romanian	Romania; Moldova	first translation		1. Harry Potter și Piatra Filozofală; 2. Harry Potter și Camera Secretelor; 3. Harry Potter și Prizonierul din Azkaban; 4. Harry Potter și Pocalul de Foc; 5. Harry Potter și Ordinul Phoenix; 6. Harry Potter și Prințul Semipur (Egmont) Harry Potter și Prințul Semisânge (Arthur); 7. Harry Potter și Talismanele Morții
Romanian	Romania; Moldova	Egmont Group	Ioana Iepureanu (I-VII)	1. Harry Potter și Piatra Filozofală; 2. Harry Potter și Camera Secretelor; 3. Harry Potter și Prizonierul din Azkaban; 4. Harry Potter și Pocalul de Foc; 5. Harry Potter și Ordinul Phoenix; 6. Harry Potter și Prințul Semipur (Egmont) Harry Potter și Prințul Semisânge (Arthur); 7. Harry Potter și Talismanele Morții
Romanian	Romania; Moldova	second translation		1. Harry Potter și Piatra Filozofală; 2. Harry Potter și Camera Secretelor; 3. Harry Potter și Prizonierul din Azkaban; 4. Harry Potter și Pocalul de Foc; 5. Harry Potter și Ordinul Phoenix; 6. Harry Potter și Prințul Semipur (Egmont) Harry Potter și Prințul Semisânge (Arthur); 7. Harry Potter și Talismanele Morții
Romanian	Romania; Moldova	Arthur (second translation)	1. Florin Bacin (I, IV); 2. Tatiana Dragomir (II, V, VII); 3. Radu Paraschivescu (III); 4. Alex Moldovan (VI)	1. Harry Potter și Piatra Filozofală; 2. Harry Potter și Camera Secretelor; 3. Harry Potter și Prizonierul din Azkaban; 4. Harry Potter și Pocalul de Foc; 5. Harry Potter și Ordinul Phoenix; 6. Harry Potter și Prințul Semipur (Egmont) Harry Potter și Prințul Semisânge (Arthur); 7. Harry Potter și Talismanele Morții
Russian	Russia	first translation		1. Гарри Поттер и философский камень 2. Гарри Поттер и Тайная комната 3. Гарри Поттер и узник Азкабана; 4. Гарри Поттер и Кубок огня 5. Гарри Поттер и Орден Феникса; 6. Гарри Поттер и Принц-полукровка; 7. Гарри Поттер и Дары Cмерти
Russian	Russia	Rosman Publishing (first translation)	1. Igor W. Oranskij (I); 2. Marina D. Litvinova (II-V); 3. Vladimir Babkov (V); 4. Viktor Golyshev (V); 5. Leonid Motylev (V); 6. Sergei Iljin (VI); 7. Maria Sokolskaya (VI); 8. Maya Lakhuti (VI-VII)	1. Гарри Поттер и философский камень 2. Гарри Поттер и Тайная комната 3. Гарри Поттер и узник Азкабана; 4. Гарри Поттер и Кубок огня 5. Гарри Поттер и Орден Феникса; 6. Гарри Поттер и Принц-полукровка; 7. Гарри Поттер и Дары Cмерти
Russian	Russia	second translation (Note: originally an unauthorized translation)		1. Гарри Поттер и философский камень 2. Гарри Поттер и Тайная комната 3. Гарри Поттер и узник Азкабана; 4. Гарри Поттер и Кубок огня 5. Гарри Поттер и Орден Феникса; 6. Гарри Поттер и Принц-полукровка; 7. Гарри Поттер и Дары Cмерти
Russian	Russia	Azbooka-Atticus: Machaon	Maria Spivak (I-VII)	1. Гарри Поттер и философский камень 2. Гарри Поттер и Тайная комната 3. Гарри Поттер и узник Азкабана; 4. Гарри Поттер и Кубок огня 5. Гарри Поттер и Орден Феникса; 6. Гарри Поттер и Принц-полукровка; 7. Гарри Поттер и Дары Cмерти
Scots	United Kingdom (Scotland)	Black & White Publishing - Itchy Coo	Matthew Fitt (I)	1. Harry Potter and the Philosopher's Stane
Serbian	Serbia; Montenegro (adapted spelling); Bosnia and Herzegovina	Alfa – Narodna Knjiga (withdrawn); Evro Giunti; Montenegro: Nova Knjiga	1. Draško Roganović & Vesna Stamenković Roganović (I–VII); 2. Ana Vukomanović (II)	Latin alphabet: 1. Hari Poter i Kamen mudrosti 2. Hari Poter i Dvorana tajni 3. Hari Poter i zatvorenik iz Askabana; 4. Hari Poter i Vatreni Pehar; 5. Hari Poter i Red feniksa 6. Hari Poter i Polukrvni Princ; 7. Hari Poter i relikvije Smrti; Cyrillic alphabet: 1. Хари Потер и Камен мудрости 2. Хари Потер и Дворана тајни 3. Хари Потер и Затвореник из Аскабана; 4. Хари Потер и Ватрени пехар 5. Хари Потер и Ред феникса 6. Хари Потер и Полукрвни Принц
Sinhala	Sri Lanka	Sarasavi Publishers (Pvt) Ltd	1. Abhaya Hewawasam (I-V); 2. Thomson A Vendabona (VI-VII)	1. හැරී පොටර් සහ මායා ගල; 2. හැරී පොටර් සහ රහස් කුටිය; 3. හැරී පොටර් සහ අස්කබාන්හි සිරකරු; 4. හැරී පොටර් සහ අග්නි කුසලානය; 5. හැරී පොටර් සහ ෆීනික්ස් නිකාය; 6. හැරී පොටර් සහ අඩ ලේ කුමාරයා; 7. හැරී පොටර් සහ ඩෙත්ලි හැලෝස්
Slovak	Slovakia	Ikar	1. Jana Petrikovičová (I-II); 2. Oľga Kralovičová (III-VI)	1. Harry Potter a Kameň mudrcov 2. Harry Potter a tajomná komnata 3. Harry Potter a väzeň z Azkabanu; 4. Harry Potter a Ohnivá čaša 5. Harry Potter a Fénixov rád 6. Harry Potter a polovičný princ 7. Harry Potter a Dary smrti
Slovene	Slovenia	Mladinska knjiga	1. Jakob J. Kenda (I-VII); 2. Branko Gradišnik (VI)	1. Harry Potter in Kamen modrosti 2. Harry Potter in Dvorana skrivnosti 3. Harry Potter in Jetnik iz Azkabana; 4. Harry Potter in Ognjeni kelih 5. Harry Potter in Feniksov red 6. Harry Potter in Princ mešane krvi (2nd translation by Kenda), Harry Potter in Polkrvni princ (1st translation by Gradišnik); 7. Harry Potter in Svetinje smrti
Spanish	Spain (Castilian); Latin America; (Both a standard Latin American version and a Rioplatense version)	Emecé Editores (I–II); Ediciones Salamandra (all titles; re-printings of I and II)	1. Alicia Dellepiane Rawson (I); 2. Nieves Martín Azofra (II–IV); 3. Adolfo Muñoz García (II–IV); 4. Gemma Rovira Ortega (V–VII)	1. Harry Potter y la piedra filosofal 2. Harry Potter y la cámara secreta 3. Harry Potter y el prisionero de Azkaban; 4. Harry Potter y el cáliz de fuego 5. Harry Potter y la Orden del Fénix; 6. Harry Potter y el misterio del príncipe (Note: Harry Potter and the mystery of the prince); 7. Harry Potter y las Reliquias de la Muerte
Swedish	Sweden; Finland	Tiden Young Books / Rabén & Sjögren	Lena Fries-Gedin	1. Harry Potter och de vises sten 2. Harry Potter och Hemligheternas kammare 3. Harry Potter och fången från Azkaban; 4. Harry Potter och den flammande bägaren 5. Harry Potter och Fenixorden; 6. Harry Potter och Halvblodsprinsen; 7. Harry Potter och dödsrelikerna
Tamil	India	Manjul Publishing House Pvt. Ltd.	PSV Kumarasamy (I-II)	1. ஹாரி பாட்டரும் ரசவாதக் கல்லும்; 2. ஹாரி பாட்டரும் பாதாள அறை ரகசியங்களும்
Telugu	India	Manjul Publishing House Pvt. Ltd.	M. S. B. P. N. V. Rama Sundari	1. హ్యారీ పోటర్ పరుసవేది
Thai	Thailand	Nanmee Books	1. Sumalee Bumrungsuk (I–II, V–VII); 2. Waleephon Wangsukun (III); 3. Ngarmpun Vejjajiva (IV)	1. แฮร์รี่ พอตเตอร์กับศิลาอาถรรพ์; 2. แฮร์รี่ พอตเตอร์กับห้องแห่งความลับ; 3. แฮร์รี่ พอตเตอร์กับนักโทษแห่งอัซคาบัน; 4. แฮร์รี่ พอตเตอร์กับถ้วยอัคนี; 5. แฮร์รี่ พอตเตอร์กับภาคีนกฟีนิกซ์; 6. แฮร์รี่ พอตเตอร์กับเจ้าชายเลือดผสม; 7. แฮร์รี่ พอตเตอร์กับเครื่องรางยมทูต
Tibetan	China (Tibet Autonomous Region)	Bod ljongs mi dmangs dpe skrun khang	1. Nor dkyil Bu chung rgyal (I-III) [Norkyil Buchung Gyal (ནོར་དཀྱིལ་བུཆུངརྒྱལ་)]	1. ཧ་རུའེ་ཕོད་ཐར་དང་ཚེ་རྡོ།; 2. ཧ་རུའེ་ཕོད་ཐར་དང་གསང་བའི་ཁང་པ།; 3. ཧ་རུའེ་ཕོད་ཐར་དང་ཨ་ཙེ་ཁཱ་པན་གྱི་བཙོན་པ།
Turkish	Turkey	first translation		
Turkish	Turkey	Dost Kitabevi	1. Mustafa Bayındır (I)	1. Harry Potter (ve) Büyülü Taş (Note: The first official translation's title inconsistently used ve, 'and'.)
Turkish	Turkey	second translation		
Turkish	Turkey	Yapı Kredi Kültür Sanat Yayıncılık	1. Ülkü Tamer (I); 2. Sevin Okyay (II-VII); 3. Kutlukhan Kutlu (III-VII, the school books)	1. Harry Potter ve Felsefe Taşı; 2. Harry Potter ve Sırlar Odası; 3. Harry Potter ve Azkaban Tutsağı; 4. Harry Potter ve Ateş Kadehi; 5. Harry Potter ve Zümrüdüanka Yoldaşlığı; 6. Harry Potter ve Melez Prens; 7. Harry Potter ve Ölüm Yadigârları
Ukrainian	Ukraine	A-BA-BA-HA-LA-MA-HA	1. Viktor Morozov (all 7 books); 2. Sofiia Andrukhovych (part of IV)	1. Гаррі Поттер і філософський камінь 2. Гаррі Поттер і Таємна кімната 3. Гаррі Поттер і в'язень Азкабану; 4. Гаррі Поттер і Келих вогню 5. Гаррі Поттер і Орден Фенікса; 6. Гаррі Поттер і Напівкровний Принц; 7. Гаррі Поттер і Смертельні Реліквії
Urdu	Pakistan	Oxford University Press	Darakhshanda Asghar Khokhar (I-IV)	1. ہیری پوٹر اور پارس پتھر; 2. ہیری پوٹر اور رازوں کا کمرہ; 3. ہیری پوٹر اور ازکبان کا قیدی; 4. ہیری پوٹر اور آگ کا پیالہ
Vietnamese	Vietnam	Youth Publishing House	Lý Lan	1. Harry Potter và Hòn Đá Phù Thủy; 2. Harry Potter và Phòng Chứa Bí Mật; 3. Harry Potter và Tên Tù Nhân Ngục Azkaban; 4. Harry Potter và Chiếc Cốc Lửa; 5. Harry Potter và Hội Phượng Hoàng; 6. Harry Potter và Hoàng Tử Lai; 7. Harry Potter và Bảo Bối Tử Thần
Welsh	United Kingdom (Wales)	Bloomsbury	Emily Huws (I)	1. Harri Potter a Maen yr Athronydd
Yiddish	Bosnia and Herzegovina; United States; Israel; Netherlands; Poland; Romania; Sweden; Ukraine	Olniansky Tekst	Arun Schaechter Viswanath(I-II)	1. הערי פּאָטער און דער פֿילאָסאָפֿישער שטיין; 2. הערי פּאָטער און די קאַמער פֿון סודות

== Unauthorised translations ==
The impatience of the international Harry Potter fan community for translations of the books has led to the proliferation of unauthorised or pirate translations that are often hastily translated and posted on the internet chapter-by-chapter, or printed by small presses and sold illegally. The work may be done by multiple translators to speed the process. Such translations are often poorly written and riddled with errors.

A team translated Harry Potter and the Deathly Hallows into Chinese three days after its English release. A director at People's Literature Publishing House, who obtained the official license, worried that the unauthorised translations would lead to the spread of pirated copies.

One notable case involved a French 16-year-old who published serialised translations of Harry Potter and the Deathly Hallows online. He was arrested and his site was later shut down; however, the wife of the official translator noted that these works do not necessarily hurt the official translation.

Another example occurred in Venezuela in 2003, when an illegal translation of the fifth book, Harry Potter and the Order of the Phoenix, appeared soon after the release of the English version and five months before the scheduled release of the Spanish translation. The pirate translation was reportedly in such poor quality that the translator added messages, including "Here comes something that I'm unable to translate, sorry," and "I'm sorry, I didn't understand what that meant" in some sections. Two people were arrested in connection with the pirated version.

Another case involved the Internet fan translation community, Harry auf Deutsch, formed to translate the Harry Potter books into German more rapidly. The German publisher of the Harry Potter books, Carlsen Verlag, filed a cease and desist against the fan translators; they complied, taking down the translations.

In some countries, where there were no authorised translations into the local language, translations not sanctioned by J. K. Rowling were prepared and published. Such was the case, for example, in Sri Lanka, where the books had been unofficially translated into Sinhala and possibly into Tamil. Authorised translations into both Sinhala and Tamil have since been published.

In Iran, several unauthorised translations of the Harry Potter books exist side by side. According to one source, there may be as many as 16 Persian translations in existence concurrently. Iran is not a member of the Universal Copyright Convention, so publishers are not prosecuted for publishing foreign books without respecting copyright or paying royalties.

A team consisting of seven Esperantist volunteers completed the translation of Harry Potter and the Philosopher's Stone into Esperanto (under the title Hari Poter kaj la ŝtono de la saĝuloj) in 2004. Rowling's representatives did not respond to offers from Esperanto-USA to make the translation available for publication. An online petition aimed at raising interest in the Esperanto translation has obtained support from approximately 800 individuals.

Agents representing J. K. Rowling have stated in the past that they cannot and do not intend to prevent individuals from translating Rowling's books for their own personal enjoyment, as long as the results are not made available to the general public.

== Fake translations ==
Whereas "pirate translations" are unauthorised translations of true Harry Potter books, "fake translations" have also appeared, which are published pastiches or fanfics that a foreign publisher has tried to pass off as the translation of the real book by Rowling. There have been several such books, including Harry Potter and Bao Zoulong which was written and published in China in 2002 before the release of the fifth book in Rowling's series, Harry Potter and the Order of the Phoenix.

Other fake Harry Potter books written in Chinese include Harry Potter and the Porcelain Doll (哈利・波特与瓷娃娃; Hālì Bōtè yǔ Cíwáwa), Harry Potter and the Golden Turtle, and Harry Potter and the Crystal Vase. In August 2007, The New York Times said that the publication of Rowling's Deathly Hallows had inspired "a surge of peculiarly Chinese imitations," and included plot synopses and excerpts from a number of derivative works, among them Harry Potter and the Chinese Overseas Students at the Hogwarts School of Witchcraft and Wizardry and Harry Potter and the Big Funnel. In 2003, legal pressure from the licensors of Harry Potter led an Indian publisher to stop publication of Harry Potter in Calcutta, a work in which Harry meets figures from Bengali literature.

== Regional adaptations ==
It is a common practice within the publishing industry to make minor changes in the text of books written in one region for publication in other regions. For example, there are a number of differences in British and American English spelling conventions; generally publishers change the spellings to conform to the expectations of their target market. Adaptation may also extend to vocabulary or grammatical choices that might impair legibility or impart some cognitive dissonance. Readers usually would not be aware of the adaptations, but the choice to change the title of the American edition of the first Harry Potter book from Harry Potter and the Philosopher's Stone to Harry Potter and the Sorcerer's Stone highlighted the practice and drew considerable attention.

The book's title was changed due to the American publisher's concern that children would be confused by a reference to philosophy. Other translations have also changed the first book's title, for instance, the French translation which changed Harry Potter and the Philosopher's Stone to Harry Potter at the School of Wizards for the same reason as the American translation, citing that the reference to the philosopher's stone legend was "too obscure for a book aimed at the youth."

Other translations also have regional adaptations that have largely gone without much notice. The Spanish translation has been adapted to three regions: Europe, Latin America and Southern Cone. Other translations have adaptations that were published seemingly to enhance the identity of minority communities of speakers: Montenegrin (an adaptation of Serbian) and Valencian (an adaptation of Catalan). It is worth noting that some translations were completed when adaptations possibly would have been sufficient; for example, any of the Serbian, Croatian or Bosnian translations could have been adapted for each region.

A comprehensive list of differences between the American and British editions of the books is collected at the Harry Potter Lexicon website. The changes are mostly simple lexical switches to reflect the different dialects and prevent American readers from stumbling over unfamiliar Briticisms. Although it is common to adapt any text from British to American editions, in the case of the Harry Potter books, this standard practice has drawn criticism from readers who feel that the British English adds flavour to the series. Rowling herself expressed regret over changing the first book's title, as the philosopher's stone is a legendary alchemical substance.

In an Associated Press interview, Rowling described how the alterations to the American editions came about:

Rowling pretended to bang her head against the sofa in mock frustration. "SO much has been made of that," she groans, noting that it was only done where words had been used that really meant something very different to Americans. Her American editor pointed out that the word jumper – British for pullover sweater – means a kind of dress in American. She had had no idea. "He asked, 'Can we change it to sweater,' which is just as British?" That was fine with Rowling.

Publisher Arthur Levine of Scholastic explained the changes in an interview with The New Yorker:

I wasn't trying to, quote, "Americanize" them... What I was trying to do is translate, which I think is different. I wanted to make sure that an American kid reading the book would have the same literary experience that a British kid would have.

The same article, however, points out that some British dialect was retained in the books, and in some cases certain phrases were replaced with more recognizable British phrases, such as "spanking good" for "cracking."

== Difficulties in translation ==
=== Translation strategies ===
The books carried a number of words that are considered loaded names by linguists and translators, meaning that they carry a semantic load, and that their morphology (structure) and phonology (sound) need to be adapted when translating them to a foreign language, for example the house names (Ravenclaw = raven + claw), or Voldemort's name ("flight of death" or "theft of death" in French). These words were translated in different countries using several translation strategies, such as copying the names with no attempt to transmit the original English meaning, transliterating even if the name lost its original meaning, replacing the name with another given name from the target language, or translating the name using native words that conveyed the same meaning. For example, in the Russian first book the transliterating strategy was used for some names because the "th" sound does not exist in Russian, so "Slytherin" was transliterated as "Slizerin". The translator of the second book chose the translating strategy instead, and she renamed the houses, "Hufflepuff" becoming "Puffendui" and "Ravenclaw" becoming "Kogtevran" (from the Russian word for claw, "kogot'"). In the Italian editions, the house names were changed to animal-colour pairings: Gryffindor is "Grifondoro" ("grifon d'oro" means "golden griffin"), Slytherin is "Serpeverde" ("serpe verde" means "green snake"), Ravenclaw was, in the first edition of the first book, "Pecoranera" ("pecora nera", "black sheep"), but was then changed to "Corvonero" ("corvo nero", "black raven") and Hufflepuff is "Tassorosso" ("tasso rosso", "red badger") in the first translation and the films and "Tassofrasso" in the revisited translation. In the French translation, the name "Hogwarts" is changed to "Poudlard", which means "bacon lice".

Marketers of Harry Potter-themed toys pressured translators not to change the names of people and things so that they could call the toys by the same name in different countries.

=== Culture and language ===
Many of the nuances of British culture and language will be unfamiliar to international readers. Such things require careful and creative translating. For the Hebrew translation, some of the Christian references were changed, because Israelis have less familiarity with cultural Christianity than readers elsewhere: a scene in which Sirius Black sings a parody of "God Rest Ye Merry, Gentlemen" replaced the song with a parody of "Mi Y'malel," a Chanukah song; on the other hand, in the Yiddish translation, translator Arun Viswanath retained all the Christian references, feeling that his readership would be familiar enough with them. In the French translation, explanations of certain features of British schools unfamiliar to French students were inserted in the dialogues (e.g., "Prefect" and "Head Boy"), but they were not distinguished from explanations in the original text of differences between ordinary British schools and wizarding schools. This could mislead readers into thinking that these features of the house and boarding systems did not exist in real-world British schools.

Nonstandard English present in the book also had to be given careful consideration. The character Rubeus Hagrid's West Country dialect, for example, needed to be rendered in other languages to reflect the fact that he speaks with an accent and uses particular types of slang. In the Japanese translation, he speaks in the Tōhoku dialect, which to a Japanese reader conveys a similar provincial feel. The same was done in Ukrainian translation where Hagrid speaks a mixture of Western Ukrainian dialects. In the Yiddish translation, translator Arun Viswanath attempted to mirror Rowling's use of regional British dialects using Yiddish dialects.

"I tried to transpose the wizarding world onto a map of the Yiddish-speaking world" — pre World War II — "without making the characters Jewish. Filch speaks in a thick Lithuanian Yiddish accent and doesn't pronounce the 'sh' sound, so he says sabes instead of shabes, and Hagrid, who despises him and speaks a very distinct rural English, speaks in a thick, almost exaggerated Polish Yiddish. I thought this was a good approach because it helps show the tension between them. As for Snape and McGonagall, well, they're Litvaks. They just are."

Some translations changed foods that appeared in the book into foods more common in the culture of their target audience in order to be more recognisable and relatable. The Hebrew translation of the scene where Dumbledore offers Professor McGonagall a lemon sherbet had him offer her a krembo, a popular Israeli treat, instead. According to the Hebrew translator, "the point of the lemon sherbets is to tell us something about Dumbledore's character in that this wise old wizard with a long white beard carries around a children's treat in his pocket. The equivalent children's dessert in Israel is the krembo. If I'd translated it as a lemon sucking candy, it wouldn't have imparted the same image of Dumbledore." The Arabic translation, which was written with a predominantly Muslim audience in mind, omitted references to food and drink forbidden by Islam. All references to pork and bacon were replaced with eggs and all references to alcoholic beverages were replaced with water, except in the case of the Death Eaters, who are villains. However, the Hebrew translation left in place references to bacon despite reader complaints that such products violated the laws of Kashrut, with the translator justifying it on the basis that the characters were not Jewish. The Chinese translation keeps the word "cornflakes" and has a footnote explaining what cornflakes are.

As the Arabic translators were seeking to cater to religiously conservative readers, they also removed every reference to characters kissing, even on the cheek, and had them wave instead.

Several other terms were translated to create cultural references for the target audience. For example, the "golden snitch" from Quidditch is rendered as "goldene flaterl" (golden butterfly) in the Yiddish translation, butterflies being a common symbol in Yiddish folktales. Similarly, the Snatchers, a group of people who capture Muggle-born wizards and other enemies of the Death Eater regime and hand them over for money following Voldemort's takeover of the Ministry of Magic, were referred to as Szmalcownicy in the Polish translation, in reference to Poles who sold out Jews to the Nazis for money during the Holocaust.

The title of the seventh book, Harry Potter and the Deathly Hallows, proved particularly difficult to translate into different languages. Rowling solved the problem by providing translators with an alternate title: Harry Potter and the Relics of Death. This became the basis for most translations of the title.

Languages with different word order than English presented challenges when a character begins speaking and is interrupted before finishing. For instance, in Harry Potter and the Deathly Hallows, Ron Weasley asks his mother "Why in the name of Merlin's saggy left..." before his father cuts him off and scolds him for talking to her that way. In other languages, such as Hebrew, nouns come before modifier adjectives, but as it is never revealed what noun Ron intended to use, it proved difficult to translate without significant guesswork.

=== Rhymes, anagrams, and acronyms ===
The series involves many songs, poems, and rhymes, some of which proved difficult to translators. One rhyme, a riddle told by a sphinx in Harry Potter and the Goblet of Fire, posed a particular problem. The riddle involves taking words from a poem and using them to form a longer word, "spider," in answer to the riddle. In the Taiwanese translation, the English words are simply put in parentheses. In other translations, the riddle is changed to provide different words that can be put together to make up the translated version of "spider".

Some acronyms also proved difficult; the abbreviations "O.W.L.s" (Ordinary Wizarding Levels) and "N.E.W.T.s" (Nastily Exhausting Wizarding Tests) needed to be translated to reflect the fact that their abbreviations spelled out the names of animals associated with the wizarding world, which did not always work in other languages. "N.E.W.T.s" was translated into Swedish as F.U.T.T. (Fruktansvärt Utmattande Trollkarls-Test, lit. 'Terribly Exhausting Wizard's Test'). Futt means "measly" in Swedish.

Other challenging names in the series include the Mirror of Erised ("desire" backwards) and Voldemort's real name. In the latter's case, the name is an anagram based on the character's birth name, Tom Marvolo Riddle, which is rearranged to spell "I am Lord Voldemort". This has required translators to alter Riddle's name to make the anagram work. Sometimes translators manage to alter only one part of the name whereas others have replaced the entire name to preserve the anagram. Other translations, such as the Taiwanese Chinese and Japanese versions, sidestepped the issue altogether by displaying the main text of the anagram in English and added in the meaning in brackets beside it. The Vietnamese version displayed the original anagram in English and added a footnote.

=== Invented words, proper nouns, and names ===
Rowling invented a great number of words and phrases for the books such as spells, incantations, magical words, items, and place names. Many of these words involve word play, rhyming, and historical references that are difficult to translate. A large number of spells are drawn from or inspired by Latin, and have a certain resonance with English speakers due to its relatively large proportion of Latinate-derived vocabulary. For example, priori incantatem (a spell which causes the last spells performed by a wand to be reproduced in reverse order) would be familiar to many English-speaking readers as the words prior (previous) and incantation (spell, charm). To create a similar effect in the Hindi version, the Sanskrit, typical in mantras, has been used for the spells. Some translators have created new words themselves; others have resorted to transliteration.

In Harry Potter and the Philosopher's Stone, when Professor McGonagall is about to introduce Harry to Oliver Wood, she asks another professor if she can "borrow Wood for a moment", momentarily confusing Harry. In order to retain this pun, the Yiddish translation renames Wood as "Oliver Holtz", holtz being the Yiddish for 'wood', unlike the Italian one, which changed the surname to "Baston", from bastone 'stick', but returned to the original "Wood" with the second translation.

Often, names in Harry Potter have historical or linguistic significance in English, which may create problems if the translator does not recognise it. Rowling commented on this phenomenon in Conversations with J.K. Rowling, in which she complained that the Italian translation of Professor Dumbledore's last name was "Silente"; rather than recognising that "Dumbledore" was an old Devon word for "bumblebee," the translator took the word "dumb" and translated it as "silent". In contrast, the Czech translator used the Old Czech word for bumblebee – Brumbál (in modern Czech čmelák). The French translation renamed Severus Snape as 'Rogue'; in Italian he was renamed "Piton" (from the Italian "pitone", "python"). Hungarian also calls him "Piton". Instead, the same Italian translation changed the name of Professor Sybill Trelawney into "Sibilla Cooman", which resembles the Italian "Sibilla Cumana", the Cumaean Sibyl, although, like many other names, it was brought back to the original in the revised translation.

=== Alternative title ===
Rowling released an alternative title for Harry Potter and the Deathly Hallows for use by translators finding difficulty translating its meaning. The alternative title (in English) is Harry Potter and the Relics of Death. In Italy the title has been translated as Harry Potter e i doni della morte replacing "hallows" with "presents" because the word "relic" is often used in reference to the remains or personal effects of a saint. This variation was proposed and then approved by J.K. Rowling.

=== Character gender ===
A few characters in the series are identified with a title and last name, or with a gender-neutral name. In some languages—for example, those where adjectives are gendered—it was necessary for the translator to guess the character's gender. The Hebrew translation initially made Blaise Zabini a girl, though the character was revealed to be a boy in later books. To avoid this problem, Isabel Nunes, one of the European Portuguese translators, asked Rowling about the gender of some of the characters—Zabini, Professor Sinistra, and "R.A.B."—while working on her translations.
