= Elizabeth Wetmore =

Elizabeth Wetmore may refer to:

- Elizabeth Bisland Wetmore, known as Elizabeth Bisland (1861–1929), American journalist and author
- Elizabeth Wetmore (novelist), American author and novelist
