= Ma Aixin =

Chinese translator

- 马爱新
- Born: 1974 (age 51–52); Nanjing, Jiangsu, China
- Education: Beijing Foreign Studies University
- Occupation: Translator
- Relatives: Ma Ainong (sister); Ma Qinghuai (grandfather)
- Writing career
- Language: Chinese, English
- Genre: Novel
- Notable work: Harry Potter series

Chinese name
- Traditional Chinese: 馬愛新
- Simplified Chinese: 马爱新
Transcriptions
Standard Mandarin
- Hanyu Pinyin: Mǎ àixīn

Ma Aixin (Chinese: 马爱新; born 1974) is a Chinese translator of literary works, especially children's literature, from English.

== Biography ==
Ma was born in Nanjing, Jiangsu, in 1974. Her grandfather Ma Qinghuai was also a translator. Her sister Ma Ainong is also a translator of children's literature. Her parent are editors. After graduating from Beijing Foreign Studies University, he worked at Foreign Translation Publishing Company. Ma's translation career commenced when, in collaboration with her sister Ma Ainong, she began to translate Joanne Kathleen Rowling's Harry Potter series, into English and had it published in China in October 2000.

== Translations ==
- Harry Potter series (哈利·波特系列)
- Seventeen (男孩十七)
- Penrod (坏男孩彭罗德)
- The Lost Prince (失踪的王子)
- The Phoenix and the Carpet (五个孩子和凤凰、魔毯)
