= Media Rodzina =

Publishing house in Poland

Media Rodzina is a publishing house in Poznań, Poland, started by Robert D. Gamble and Bronisław Kledzik in 1992. Their first published title was Jak mówić, żeby dzieci nas słuchały. Jak słuchać, żeby dzieci do nas mówiły, is a translation of How to Talk So Kids Will Listen & Listen So Kids Will Talk by Adele Faber and Elaine Mazlish.

Media Rodzina is the Polish translator of the Harry Potter series. Andrzej Polkowski was the main translator for the series.
