= Art e Dossier =

Italian monthly art magazine

Art e Dossier is an Italian monthly art magazine published by Giunti Editore. Founded in 1986, the publication covers classical and contemporary art, exhibition reviews, and cultural heritage news.

The magazine divides each issue into two distinct sections. The first section functions as a standard periodical, featuring articles on current art events, museum news, and market trends. The second section, the "dossier," is a bound scholarly monograph (~50 pages) dedicated to a single subject, such as a specific artist, an artistic movement, or a historical period. Over the magazine's publication history, these dossiers have built a comprehensive library of introductory art history texts, with several hundred monographs currently in circulation.
