= Polkowski =

Polkowski is a Polish surname. Notable people with the surname include:

- Andrzej Polkowski (1939–2019), Polish translator
- Grzegorz Polkowski (born 1983), Polish Paralympic swimmer
