= Ma Ainong =

Chinese translator

- 马爱农
- Born: September 1964 (age 61); Nanjing, Jiangsu, China
- Education: Nanjing University; Beijing Foreign Studies University
- Occupation: Translator
- Relatives: Ma Qinghuai (grandfather); Ma Aixin (sister)
- Writing career
- Language: Chinese, English
- Genre: Novel
- Notable works: Anne of Green Gables; Harry Potter series

Chinese name
- Traditional Chinese: 馬愛農
- Simplified Chinese: 马爱农
Transcriptions
Standard Mandarin
- Hanyu Pinyin: Mǎ Àinóng

Ma Ainong (Chinese: 马爱农; born September 1964) is a Chinese translator of literary works, especially children's literature, from English. She is famous for her translation of J. K. Rowling's Harry Potter series.

== Biography ==
Ma was born in Nanjing, Jiangsu, in September 1964. Her grandfather Ma Qinghuai was also a translator. Her sister Ma Aixin is also a translator of children's literature. Her parent are editors. In 1982, she entered Nanjing University, majoring in English at the Department of Foreign Language, where she graduated in 1986. After university, she taught at Nanjing Medical University as an English teacher. In 1990 she became a postgraduate student at Beijing Foreign Studies University. After graduating in 1993 she worked as an editor at the Foreign Language Editorial Room of People's Literature Publishing House.

== Translations ==
- Legend of Narnia: Lions, Witches and Wardrobes (纳尼亚传奇：狮子，女巫和魔衣柜)
- Little House on the Prairie (大草原上的小木屋)
- Anne of Green Gables (绿山墙的安妮)
- The Wonderful Wizard of Oz (绿野仙踪)
- Black Beauty (黑骏马)
- The Little Bookroom: The Glass Peacock (小书房之玻璃孔雀)
- The Little Bookroom: Miracle of the Poor Island (小书房之穷到的奇迹)
- Five Children and It (五个孩子和沙地精)
- Alice's Adventures in Wonderland (爱丽丝漫游奇境)
- The Luminaries (发光体)
- Tom's Midnight Garden (汤姆的午夜花园)
- Andersen's Fairy Tales (安徒生童话)
- Guardians of Ga'Hoole (猫头鹰王国)
- Harry Potter series (哈利·波特系列)
- The Silkworm (蚕)
- The Tales of Beedle the Bard (诗翁彼豆故事集)
- Pax (小狐狸派克斯)
- The Mystery of Bessie's Growth (贝茜成长的奥秘)
- Ginger of the Paiys (派伊家的金吉尔)
- The Dreamer of Fire Valley (萤火谷的梦想家)
- The Railway Children (铁路边的孩子)
- Magic Castle (魔法城堡)
- My Friend Zachary (我的朋友扎卡里)
- Peter Pan (彼得·潘)
- Ben and Me (本和我)
- Little Miss (奇先生妙小姐)
- Theft of Prince McCream (麦淇淋王子失窃案)
- Dead Poets Society (死亡诗社)
- The Little Old Lady Who Was Not Afraid Of Anything (什么都不怕的小妇人)
- Naked Lunch (裸体午餐)
- Where Angels Fear to Tread (天使不敢涉足的地方)
- An Artist of the Floating World (浮世画家)
- Going Home Again (回家)
- The Hill Bachelors (山区光棍)
- Rabbit Hill (兔子坡)
- The Gift of the Magi (麦琪的礼物)

== Awards ==
- 2014 Claire Keegan's Walking on the blue field Irish-Chinese Literature Translation Prize
- IBBY Translation Award
