= Pollomuhku ja Posityyhtynen =

Non-fictional book

- Author: Jaana Kapari-Jatta
- Cover artist: Mika Launis
- Language: Finnish
- Genre: linguistics
- Published: 2008
- Publisher: Tammi
- Publication place: Finland
- Pages: 164
- ISBN: 978-951-31-4044-1

Pollomuhku ja Posityyhtynen (Bubotuber and Pigwidgeon) is a 2008 fact book by the Finnish translator of the Harry Potter books, Jaana Kapari-Jatta.

In her book, Kapari-Jatta answers in popular style questions that the Finnish readers of the Harry Potter books have asked her. She recounts how she came about to translate the book series, discusses how she recreated in Finnish the words that were made up by J. K. Rowling, including quidditch and Gringotts which became huispaus and Irveta, respectively. She also tells about the profession of a translator, and what was it like to receive fame as the translator of Harry Potter, and discusses the cover art of Mika Launis who designed the covers for the Finnish-language editions.

== Reviews ==
- Viertola, Mari: Uskollisuusloitsut koetuksella. Turun Sanomat, 8 March 2008. (In Finnish.)
- Partanen, Markus: Potter-kääntäjän paljastukset. Karjalainen, 8 March 2008. (In Finnish.)
- Kantola, Jaana: Kääntäjän muotokuva: Miten uusia sanoja oikein luodaan? Helsingin Sanomat, 8 March 2008. (In Finnish.)
