= Robert Gamble =

Robert Gamble may refer to:

- Robert D. Gamble (1937–2020), businessman and priest
- Robert J. Gamble (1851–1924), politician

== See also ==
- Robert Gamble House, a building in Florida
