= Haim Ginott =

Israeli psychologist (1922–1973)

Haim G. Ginott
- חיים גינות
- Born: Haim G. Ginzburg; August 5, 1922; Tel Aviv, Mandatory Palestine
- Died: November 4, 1973 (aged 51)
- Occupation: Teacher
- Known for: Between Parent and Child

Haim G. Ginott (né Ginzburg; Hebrew: חיים גינות; August 5, 1922 – November 4, 1973) was a school teacher, a child psychologist and psychotherapist and a parent educator. He pioneered techniques for conversing with children that are still taught today. His book, Between Parent and Child, stayed on the best seller list for over a year and is still popular today. This book sets out to give "specific advice derived from basic communication principles that will guide parents in living with children in mutual respect and dignity."

== Early life and education ==
Ginott was born in 1922 in Tel Aviv, British Mandatory Palestine. He had three brothers. After emigrating to the United States he graduated from Columbia University's Teachers College in 1948, and then earned his master's degree in 1949. He then studied psychology at Columbia University, where he earned a doctorate in clinical psychology in 1952.

== Career ==
Ginott's career began as an elementary school teacher in Israel in 1947. He was resident psychologist on NBC's "Today Show." He wrote a weekly syndicated newspaper column called "Between Us," and lectured in Europe, Israel and in the U.S. He was adjunct professor of psychology at the New York University Graduate School, and he was a clinical professor in Adelphi University's postdoctoral program in psychotherapy. He was a United Nations Educational, Scientific and Cultural Organization consultant to the Israeli ministry of education. He also served as the Chief Clinical Psychologist at the Child Guidance Clinic in Jacksonville from 1952 to 1960.

== Communications approach ==
Ginott's approach to child-rearing and education was one in which the parent/educator strives to understand the feelings and mind of the student/child using respectful language of compassion and understanding. He asserted that children learned how their parents/teachers felt about them by how they spoke to them. The following serve to illustrate Dr. Ginott's communications approach.

- Never deny or ignore a child's feelings.
- Only the behavior is treated as unacceptable, never the child.
- Depersonalize negative interactions by mentioning only the problem. "I see a messy room."
- Attach rules to things, e.g., "Little sisters are not for hitting."
- Dependence breeds hostility. Let children do for themselves what they can.
- Children need to learn to choose, but within the safety of limits. "Would you like to wear this blue shirt or this red one?"
- Limit criticism to a specific event—don't say "never", "always", as in: "You never listen," "You always manage to spill things", etc.
- Refrain from using words that you would not want the child to repeat.
- Ignore irrelevant behavior

Adele Faber and Elaine Mazlish were members of a parenting group run by Dr. Ginott, and state in an introduction that Dr. Ginott's classes were the inspiration for the books they wrote.

== Quotes from Between Parent and Teenager ==
- "Rebellion follows rejection."
- "Truth for its own sake can be a deadly weapon in family relations. Truth without compassion can destroy love. Some parents try too hard to prove exactly how, where and why they have been right. This approach will bring bitterness and disappointment. When attitudes are hostile, facts are unconvincing." (p. 38)

== Quotes from Teacher and Child ==
I have come to a frightening conclusion.

I am the decisive element in the classroom.
It is my personal approach that creates the climate.
It is my daily mood that makes the weather.
As a teacher I possess tremendous power to make a child's life miserable or joyous.
I can be a tool of torture or an instrument of inspiration.
I can humiliate or humor, hurt or heal.
In all situations, it is my response that decides whether a crisis
will be escalated or de-escalated, and a child humanized or de-humanized

- "If you want your children to improve, let them overhear the nice things you say about them to others."

== Personal life ==
Ginott resided at 923 Fifth Avenue in New York City. He was survived by his widow, the former Dr. Alice Lasker, who was also a psychologist and co-author, with her husband, of "Between Husband and Wife." They had two daughters, Mimi and Mrs. Roz Frumess.

From 1952 to 1960, he served as the Chief Clinical Psychologist at the Child Guidance Clinic in Jacksonville, Florida.

== Death ==
Ginott died at Beekman Downtown Hospital on November 4, 1973. He was buried in Israel at Kibbutz Sha'ar HaGolan in the Jordan Valley.

== Bibliography ==
- Between Parent and Child (1965, Macmillan)
- Between Parent and Teenager (1967, Macmillan)
- Teacher and Child (1972, Macmillan)

== See also ==
- How to Talk So Kids Will Listen & Listen So Kids Will Talk
- Siblings Without Rivalry: How to Help Your Children Live Together So You Can Live Too
- Adele Faber
- Elaine Mazlish
