= Voyage to the End of the Room =

- First edition (publ. Chatto & Windus)
- Author: Tibor Fischer
- Language: English
- Publication date: 2003

Voyage to the End of the Room is a 2003 novel by British author Tibor Fischer, about a wealthy woman who never leaves her apartment.

== Plot ==
The central character Oceane is a former dancer who worked in Barcelona's sex industry, before making her fortune in software, and is now rich enough that she need never leave her flat. Inside, she acts out foreign expeditions within her apartment walls in the manner of the hero of J.-K. Huysmans' A Rebours. However, when she receives a letter from a dead lover, memories of her past are stirred up and she sends someone back to investigate.

== Critical reaction ==
Critical reaction was generally less positive than for his earlier novels. Shortly before its publication, Fischer had published a vicious attack on Martin Amis and his new novel Yellow Dog, and some critics saw that as a crude publicity stunt to stir up interest for this book; but they found the novel did not live up to Fischer's invective.

Jay McInerney in the NY Times called it "a sort of parody of his earlier work", and found it offered "intermittent" pleasures from good use of language and observation, but its fashionable foreign settings didn't translate into atmosphere and it could be set anywhere thanks to a general vagueness. Steven Poole in The Guardian felt that Fischer was unable to create the voice of a female character, and found the book dominated by "stale", pointless and vague wordplay. Eleanor Black in the New Zealand Herald found the heroine unlikable and hard to identify with. The Chicago Tribune's David L. Ulin said "this book marks a turning point in Fischer's career, the place at which we can no longer offer excuses for his decline".

Kirkus Reviews was more positive, impressed by Fischer's "dead-on social observations and murderous wit".
