= Elizabeth Wetmore (novelist) =

American novelist

Elizabeth Wetmore (born 1967/68) is an American novelist, notable for her debut 2020 novel Valentine, which she published at the age of 52 and which made it to The New York Times hardcover fiction bestseller list.

Wetmore was born in Odessa, Texas. She left Texas at the age of 18 and never returned to live there. She graduated from Iowa Writers' Workshop and eventually moved to Chicago. Before Valentine, she published short stories in various literary magazines. She names, among others, Cormac McCarthy, Paulette Jiles, and Marilynne Robinson as literary influences.

Valentine is set in Texas in 1976. It was translated to Dutch (by Anne Jongeling), Polish (by Hanna Pasierska) and Russian (by Viktor Golyshev).

Wetmore is married to the poet Jorge Sanchez and has a son.
