= Giunti Editore =

Italian publishing house

Giunti Editore S.p.A.

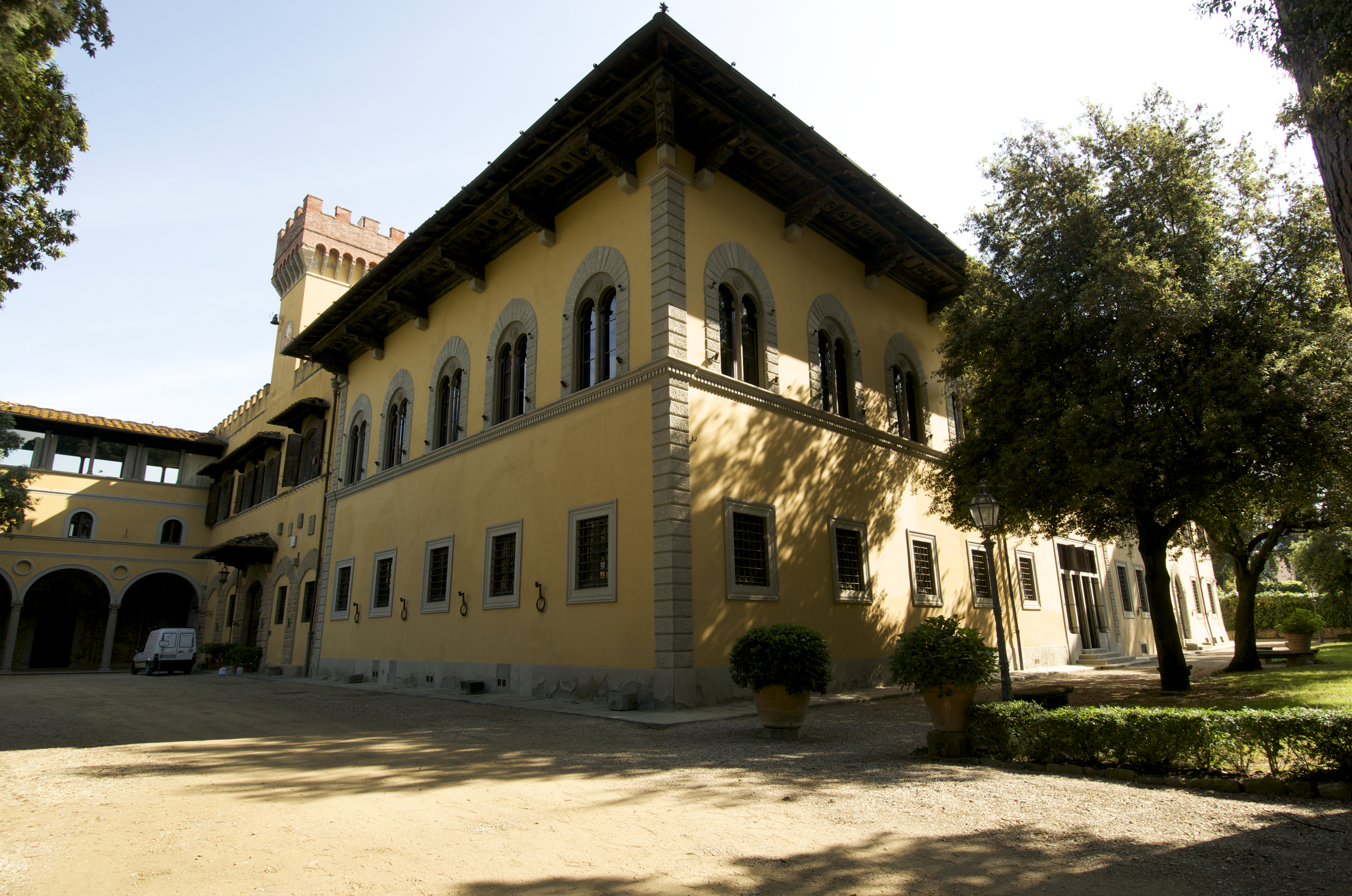
- Giunti Editore S.p.A. headquarter at Villa La Loggia.
- Type: Private
- Industry: Publishing
- Genre: Biographies; Art Books; Non Fiction; Science fiction; Novels; and more
- Founded: 1956; 70 years ago in Florence, Italy
- Founder: Renato Giunti
- Headquarters: Villa La Loggia, Florence, Italy
- Area served: Italy; Europe
- Key people: Sergio Giunti (Chairman); Andrea Giunti (CEO); Daniele Tinelli (CFO)
- Products: books; magazines
- Brands: Bompiani; De Vecchi Editore; Demetra; Dami Editore; Disney Italy Books; Edizioni del Borgo; Giorgio Nada Editore; Slow Food Editore
- Revenue: €275 million (2024)
- Website: giunti.it

Giunti Editore S.p.A. is an Italian publishing house founded in Florence in 1965. The company is based in Villa La Loggia, in via Bolognese, and affiliated offices in Milan. Giunti S.p.A. is the leading company within a group comprising various brands; it ranks second among Italian publishing groups in terms of turnover and operates the largest chain of bookshops.

== History ==
The publishing house traces its history back to the Florentine Libreria Editrice Felice Paggi, founded in 1834. It specialized in schoolbooks and children's literature. In 1883, the publisher released Pinocchio, one of the most famous Italian books in the world. In 1889, the Paggi brothers sold their company to a relative Roberto Bemporad and his son Enrico. After the premature death of Roberto Bemporad, Enrico, only in his early twenties, remained the sole owner of the publishing house. He turned out to be a gifted manager and after a few years he transformed the company into a modern publishing house of an international level. They published not only schoolbooks, but also a wide range of fiction and non-fiction.

In 1938, the fascist racial laws that prohibited Jews to lead any financial activity in Italy, hit the company hard; it had to change the legal structure and also the owners. The publisher was renamed Marzocco, an ancient symbol of Florence, and was operated by Ugo Ojetti and, later, Giovanni Calò. In 1935, Renato Giunti joined the company as a administrative director. In 1947, he acquired the business and in 1959 renamed it Bemporad Marzocco. In 1965 all the acquired publishing houses were brought together in the Giunti Publishing Consortium. leaving to Bemporad Marzocco and Barbera only smaller imprints. In 1975, Sergio Giunti, Renato's son, succeeded his father as head of the Consortium. As Sergio recalled, at that point he was more attracted to horse riding, than to editorial business, and told his father that he would like to earn a lot of money by his work. Renato Giunti showed him a list of businesspeople with the highest declared incomes, headed by Angelo Rizzoli, and said: ‘If you like risky business, then books are what you need.’

Until the mid-eighties, Giunti edited a few magazines, including: "La Vita Scolastica" (launched in 1947) and "Contemporary Psychology", which appeared in 1974. In 1986 Sergio Giunti started an important publishing project in the magazine sector launching on market, six monthly cultural magazines: "Art and Dossier", "History and Dossier", "Medicine and Dossier", "Music and Dossier", "Science and Dossier", and "Archeologia Viva", all with innovative formula of the magazine with a monographic dossier at the center.

Until the mid-eighties, Giunti edited a few magazines, including: "La Vita Scolastica" (launched in 1947) and "Contemporary Psychology", which appeared in 1974. In 1986 Sergio Giunti started an important publishing project in the magazine sector launching on market, six monthly cultural magazines: "Art and Dossier", "History and Dossier", "Medicine and Dossier", "Music and Dossier", "Science and Dossier", and "Archeologia Viva", all with innovative formula of the magazine with a monographic dossier at the center.

The 1966 flood of the Arno that hit Florence on 4 November practically destroyed everything that the company possessed. All the archives were lost, the printing plant and warehouses destroyed. Sergio Giunti stated that they had to throw away 855 lorryloads of books, paper and furniture, and were only partially reimbursed by the insurance. The company, however, recovered very fast – it received state subsidised loans at three per cent, to be repaid over ten years, and already in a month printed a million of volumes.

In 1990 the company was restructured into Giunti Publishing Group (in Italian: Gruppo Editoriale Giunti S.p.A.). In the next year, the Group acquired the Demetra publishing house, followed by several others: Dami, De Vecchi, Fatatrac, Motta Junior, and others.

In the late 1990s, the group entered the multimedia sector by launching "Giunti Multimedia". In 2002, all the multimedia activities of Giunti Multimedia and Giunti Ricerca were merged into "Giunti Labs".

In 1993, the Group reopened Demetra's bookstores under own brand "Giunti al Punto". By 2025, the chain of retail outlets exceeded 260 stores across Italy.

=== XXI century ===
In 2003 Giunti Gruppo Editoriale S.p.A. changed its name to Giunti Editore S.p.A.

In 2014, the publishing company reached an agreement with Disney Italia. Giunti became the editor of some publishing products, both paper and digital, with the Disney Books brand and the paper publishing products under the Marvel and Lucasfilm brand.

In 2015, the Group collaborated with publishers and the chain to produce the National Edition of Leonardo da Vinci’s Manuscripts and Drawings, a project that began in 1964. Giunti Editore in Florence was entrusted with the curation and facsimile reproduction of all Leonardo da Vinci’s works: for the first time, the owners of Leonardo’s works granted direct access to the originals for this collection.

In 2015, the Group reported a consolidated turnover of €198 million through its publishing houses and the chain of 190 Giunti al Punto bookshops.

In autumn 2016, the Bompiani publishing house, sold by Mondadori for €16.5 million, became part of the group, under the guidance of editor-in-chief Beatrice Masini.

In 2016, Andrea Giunti, Sergio's grandson, joined the board of directors. In 2025, Giunti Group announced partnership with Storm Publishing. According to the new agreement, Storm will publish Giunti's e Bompiani's bestsellers in the English language. In 2025, the Group reported a 4.5% growth and estimated cash flow growth of 10–15% over the next 2–3 years.

== History of denominations ==
- Marzocco, 17 October 1938 – 1959;
- Bemporad-Marzocco, 25 June 1959 – 1974;
- Giunti-Marzocco S.p.A., 20 December 1974 – 1990;
- Gruppo Editoriale Giunti S.p.A., 1990 – 2003;
- Giunti Editore S.p.A., 2003 – current.

== Main group companies ==
- Bompiani (since 2016);
- Giunti Editore SpA;
- Giunti al Punto SpA;
- Giunti Industrie Grafiche SpA;
- Giunti Distribuzione SpA;
- Giunti Scuola Srl;
- Giunti Psychometrics Srl;
- Fatatrac Srl (since 2007);
- Pon Pon Edizioni Srl;
- Giorgio Nada Editore Srl;
- Edizioni del Borgo Srl (since 2008);
- Dami Editore Srl;
- Demetra;
- De Vecchi Editore (since 2009);
- Disney Italia libri (since 2014);
- Motta Junior;
- Rebel Books.

== Associated companies ==
- IF Edizioni Srl;
- Slow Food Editore Srl (since 2009);
- Lito Terrazzi Srl (printing and binding);
- Treccani and Giunti TVP Editori Srl, 28,5%;
- The Quarto Group, 30%;
- Storm Publishing Ltd, 20% (since 2025).

== Main authors ==
- Roberto Baiocchi
- Barbara Baraldi
- Corina Bomann
- Antonio Fusco
- Martin Österdahl
- Lucinda Riley
- Antonio Scurati
- Clara Sereni

== Literature ==
- Giocondi, Michele (2018). Breve storia dell’editoria italiana (1861-2018) con 110 schede monografiche. goWare. ISBN 9788833631196.
