= Jean-François Ménard =

French translator and writer (born 1948)

Jean-François Ménard (born 1948) is a French author and translator, known for translating the Harry Potter books into French. By October 2017, Ménard had translated 250 works, including The BFG by Roald Dahl and the Artemis Fowl series by Eoin Colfer.

He studied philosophy for one year at Paris Nanterre University, coinciding with the May 1968 student protests and then went into cinema, serving as assistant director to Philippe de Broca on Les Caprices de Marie. Starting from the 1970s, he wrote original children's literature for Gallimard Jeunesse, before moving on to translations.

Ménard came up with his own French-language names for features of the Harry Potter books. For example, the Sorting Hat became a choixpeau, a cross between choix (choice) and chapeau (hat). He translated Harry Potter and the Half-Blood Prince in two months, commenting that it was more difficult than previous translations due to J.K. Rowling's improved writing and the intensity of the narrative.

On 31 March 2017, Ménard was awarded an honorary doctorate from the University of Mons in Belgium.

== See also ==
- Harry Potter in translation
