= The Collector Collector =

1997 novel by Tibor Fischer

- First edition (UK) (with quote from Tom Robbins)
- Author: Tibor Fischer
- Language: English
- Publisher: Secker & Warburg (UK); Metropolitan Books (US)
- Publication date: 1997
- Publication place: United Kingdom
- Pages: 224
- ISBN: 0-436-20436-3

The Collector Collector is the third novel by British author Tibor Fischer first published in 1997, by Secker and Warburg in the UK and Henry Holt in the US. It has also been published in Canada and Germany (as Die Voyeurin). Mixed reviews appeared in many notable publications both in the UK and US, for example The Guardian, The New Statesman, The New York Times, The Spectator and The Times Literary Supplement, there being admiration for Fischer's wit and wordplay but a feeling that it lacked a real story. The book was named one of the greatest of the 1990s as well.

The book is narrated by a bowl which passes between different owners, making it an example of a novel of circulation.

== Plot introduction ==
The narrator of the tale (and the collector of its collectors) is an ancient Sumerian bowl which finds itself in a South London flat of its new owner Rosa. The bowl not only acts as a repository for 5,000 years of human history but is also able to communicate with those who handle it; reading memories and imparting wisdom...
