= Manjul Publishing House =

Indian publishing house

Manjul Publishing House Pvt. Ltd.
- Company type: Public
- Industry: Books
- Founded: 1999
- Headquarters: Bhopal, India
- Website: www.manjulindia.com

Manjul Publishing House Pvt. Ltd (also known as Manjul Publications) is a publishing house in Bhopal, India. It is well known for the translations of the Harry Potter novels into Hindi. It was established in 1999.

== Major published books ==
- Harry Potter series
  - हैरी पॉटर और पारस पत्थर Harry Potter aur Paaras Pathar (November 2002)
    (eng) Harry Potter and the Philosopher's Stone
  - हैरी पॉटर और रहस्यमयी तहख़ाना Harry Potter aur Rahasyamayi Tehkhana (July 2005)
    (eng) Harry Potter and the Chamber of Secrets
  - हैरी पॉटर और अज़्काबान का क़ैदी Harry Potter aur Azkaabaan ka Qaidi (February 2006)
    (eng) Harry Potter and the Prisoner of Azkaban
  - हैरी पॉटर और आग का प्याला Harry Potter aur Aag ka Pyaala (2006 July)
    (eng) Harry Potter and the Goblet of Fire
  - हैरी पॉटर और मयापंछी का समूह Harry Potter aur Mayapanchhi ka Samooh (July 2007)
    (eng) Harry Potter and the Order of the Phoenix
  - हैरी पॉटर और हाफ़ ब्लड प्रिंस Harry Potter aur Half-Blood Prince (September 2007)
    (eng) Harry Potter and the Half-Blood Prince
  - हैरी पॉटर और मौत के तोहफ़े Harry Potter aur Maut Ke Tohfe (June 2008)
    (eng) Harry Potter and the Deathly Hallows

Manjul Publishings also published some bestseller books like "The Dark Firefly" written by Parnika Shrotriya and "Daastan-e-Mughal-e-Azam", written by Rajkumar Keswani.

== Harry Potter books in Hindi ==
In India, a significant number of children residing in urban areas and large towns are well acquainted with the fictional character of Harry Potter. However, not all children are proficient in reading international-style English, and some may only have been introduced to the character through Hindi dubbed movie adaptations. As a result, the accessibility and popularity of the Harry Potter franchise in India have been shaped by factors such as language proficiency and availability of translations. They want to read the books in Hindi. To reach these children, Manjul Publications published Harry Potter books in simple Hindi. The magic spells are translated into Sanskrit for effect, echoing the fact that in the English edition, spells are rendered in Latin.

The book covers of the Hindi series are identical to the covers of the American Scholastic edition, as stipulated by the rights owners.

== See also ==
- Harry Potter in translation
