= Robert D. Gamble =

American businessman and priest (1937–2020)

Robert David Gamble (born 9 March 1937 in Philadelphia, died on 17 November 2020 in Poznań) was an American businessman and Episcopal priest, a great-grandson of James Gamble (an Irishman of Scottish descent). Between 1980 and 1992, he was a hospital chaplain in Boston. In 1984, he started being engaged in the movement of Alcoholics Anonymous in Poland. In 1991 or 1992, he co-founded Radio Obywatelskie (Civic Radio, on Polish Wikipedia). In 1992, he co-founded Media Rodzina (a publishing house in Poznań). In 1999, he received the Order of Merit of the Republic of Poland. Between 2005 and 2014, he was the pastor of the Anglican Church in Poland (on Polish Wikipedia). In 2014, he received a title of a titular pastor of this parish from the Bishop in Europe. He used to organize a Christmas Eve for the solitary people in Poznań. In 2016, he received the Title of Merit of the City of Poznań (on Polish Wikipedia). He published a Polish version of Harry Potter and the Philosopher's Stone, an autobiography of Barack Obama, and Promise Me, Dad (a 2017 memoir by 46th U.S. President Joe Biden). Both in the case of Barack Obama and Joe Biden, he published their books before they became a President of the United States.
