= Beatrice Masini =

Italian writer and translator

Beatrice Masini (1 April 1962 in Milan) is an Italian writer, journalist and translator, best known for her Italian translations of the Harry Potter novels. Her own novels have been nominated for the Strega Prize in 2010, and the Premio Campiello in 2013.

== Biography ==
An author of children's books, she is also a highly regarded Italian translator. Among her works is the Italian translation of several books in J. K. Rowling Harry Potter series, published by Salani (publisher).

His novel Bambini nel bosco (Fanucci) was a finalist for the 2010 Strega Prize. It is the first children's book ever to have competed for the prize.

With her novel Tentativi di botanica degli affetti (Bompiani), she was a finalist for the Premio Campiello and winner of the “Alessandro Manzoni - Città Di Lecco” International Literary Prize, both in 2013.

Her works have been translated in fifteen countries. Among other awards, she has received the Pippi Prize for Signore e signorine (Ladies and Young Ladies) and the Elsa Morante Prize for La spada e il cuore (The Sword and the Heart).

She has won the Andersen Prize - The World of Childhood five times, both as an author and as a translator.

Since fall 2015, she has been the editorial director of Bompiani.
