= Jaana Kapari-Jatta =

Finnish translator of fiction (born 1955)

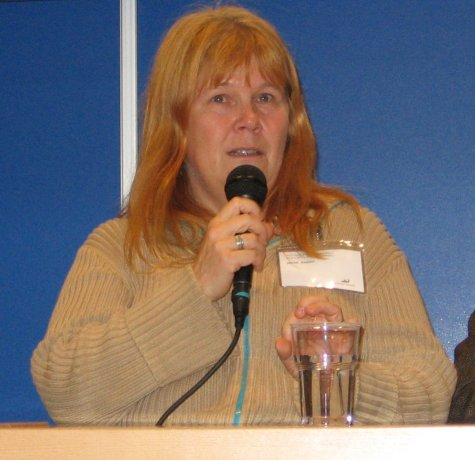
Jaana Kapari-Jatta in 2007.

Jaana Marjatta Kapari-Jatta (born 19 May 1955, in Turku) is a Finnish translator of fiction, best known for her Finnish-language renderings of the Harry Potter novels and supplementary books by J. K. Rowling, including Harry Potter and the Cursed Child. In her translations of Fantastic Beasts and Where to Find Them and Quidditch Through the Ages, she used the pseudonym “Kurvaa Aka (Whoss Gue)”.

Kapari-Jatta has also translated several other English-language authors, like Edgar Allan Poe, Oscar Wilde, and Roald Dahl, into Finnish. Among the awards she has received are the Astrid Lindgren Prize of the International Federation of Translators in 2002 and the Finnish State Prize for Children's Culture in 2007. In 2014 she received the J. A. Hollo Prize for her translation of Virginia Woolf’s book The Death of the Moth and Other Essays. In 2022, she received a honoris causa doctorate from the Faculty of Philosophy at the University of Helsinki.

In 2008, she published a fact book, Pollomuhku ja Posityyhtynen, where she discusses translating the Harry Potter novels.

Kapari-Jatta is married and has three children and also grandchildren. She resides in Loviisa, Finland, and in Serekunda, Gambia.

== Translated books ==
=== Harry Potter books by J. K. Rowling ===
- Harry Potter and the Philosopher's Stone
- Harry Potter and the Chamber of Secrets
- Harry Potter and the Prisoner of Azkaban
- Harry Potter and the Goblet of Fire
- Harry Potter and the Order of the Phoenix
- Harry Potter and the Half-Blood Prince
- Harry Potter and the Deathly Hallows
- Fantastic Beasts and Where to Find Them
- Quidditch Through the Ages
- The Tales of Beedle the Bard
- Harry Potter and the Cursed Child
- Fantastic Beasts and Where to Find Them: The Original Screenplay

=== Other books (selection) ===
- The Wonderful Story of Henry Sugar and Six More by Roald Dahl
- Nancy Drew series by Carolyn Keene
- Collected Stories by Edgar Allan Poe
- Ottoline and the Yellow Cat by Chris Riddell
- Holes by Louis Sachar
- Diana: The Last Year by Donald Spoto
- Mr Gum series by Andy Stanton
- Mary Poppins by P. L. Travers
- The Happy Prince and Other Stories by Oscar Wilde
