= Tibor Fischer =

British writer (born 1959)

Tibor Fischer FRSL
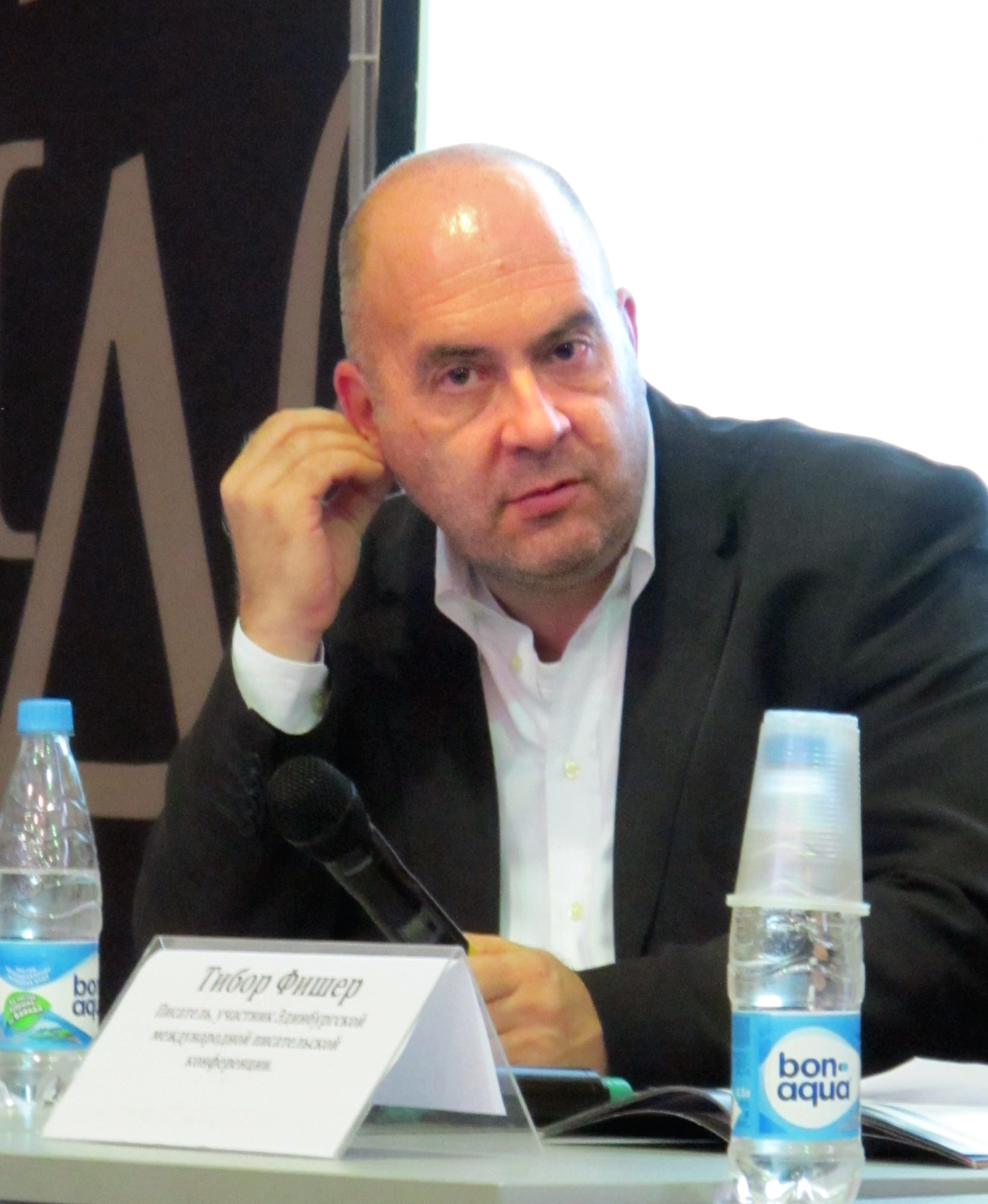
- Fischer at Krasnoyarsk, 2012
- Born: 15 November 1959 (age 66); Stockport, England
- Education: Peterhouse, Cambridge
- Occupations: Novelist; short-story writer
- Notable work: Under the Frog (1992)
- Awards: Betty Trask Prize

Tibor Fischer (born 15 November 1959) is a British novelist and short-story writer. In 1993, he was selected by the literary magazine Granta as one of the 20 best young British writers, while his 1992 novel Under the Frog was featured on the Booker Prize shortlist.

== Early life ==
Tibor Fischer was born in Stockport, England, in 1959. His parents were Hungarian basketball players who fled Hungary in 1956; first his father, György Fischer, and then his mother, the captain of the women's national basketball team. György studied economics at Manchester University, started work in the Hungarian section of the BBC, taking the name "George Fischer", and ended up as Radio Four's head of talks and documentaries.

Fischer grew up in Bromley, Kent, where he attended the local comprehensive school. He read Latin and French at Peterhouse, Cambridge.

== Author ==
The 1956 revolution, and his father's background, informed Fischer's debut novel Under the Frog, about a Hungarian basketball team in the first years of Communism in Hungary. The title is derived from a Hungarian saying, that the worst possible place to be is "under a frog's arse down a coal mine."

In 1992, the novel won a Betty Trask Prize for literature, and was shortlisted for the Booker Prize.

Fischer's subsequent novels include The Thought Gang (1994), about a delinquent and alcoholic philosophy professor who hooks up with a failed one-armed bandit in France to form a successful team of bank robbers, and The Collector Collector (1997), about a weekend in South London, narrated by a 5000-year-old Sumerian pot. Voyage to the End of the Room was published in 2003, and concerned an agoraphobic ex-dancer.

Good to be God was published by Alma Books on 4 September 2008. In it a broke, unemployed, "habitual failure" uses his friend's credit card to start a new life in Florida where he decides that the fastest way to make a fortune would be to start a religion.

In 2000, Fischer published a short-story collection entitled Don't Read This Book If You're Stupid, published in the U.S. as I Like Being Killed: Stories.

He was elected a Fellow of the Royal Society of Literature (FRSL) in 2003.

== Academia ==
In 2009, Fischer became the Royal Literary Fund writing fellow at City and Guilds of London Art School.

== Politics ==
In April 2017, Fischer wrote an opinion piece in The Guardian where he defended Hungarian prime minister Viktor Orbán's government against charges of authoritarianism and antisemitism. In the same context, he rejected notions of the government going after the George Soros-funded Central European University, arguing that the relevant and controversial amendment to the law on higher education affects some 28 foreign institutions, 27 of which were found to be operating with "irregularities" ("largely sloppy paperwork, something that will come as no surprise to anyone familiar with university admin") and that none has been fined or shut down. Fischer posits that the CEU "is not being singled out for punishment" but "asking to be given privileged treatment."

In response to it, the newspaper received letters from CEU president Michael Ignatieff, Brian J. Dooley, of Human Rights First, and others, who expressed their opposition to Fischer's views, arguing that the amendment requires the operation of a campus in CEU's country of origin, something that "would effectively make it impossible for CEU to operate in Hungary", and denying that the university has sought "special privileges".

Three days before the 2026 Hungarian general election, Fischer wrote in The Daily Telegraph that Orbán was highly popular among Hungarians and would easily be re-elected. Orbán was subsequently ousted in a landslide.

== Works ==
=== Novels ===
- Under the Frog (1992)
- The Thought Gang (1994)
- The Collector Collector (1997)
- Voyage to the End of the Room (2003)
- Good to be God (2008)
- The Hungarian Tiger (2014)
- How to Rule the World (2018)
- My Bags are Big (2026)

=== Collections ===
- Don't Read This Book If You're Stupid (2000) (US title: I Like Being Killed)
- Crushed Mexican Spiders (2011)
