= The Thought Gang =

1994 novel by Tibor Fischer

- First edition (UK)
- Author: Tibor Fischer
- Language: English
- Publisher: Polygon Books (UK); The New Press (US)
- Publication date: 1994
- Publication place: United Kingdom
- Media type: Print
- Pages: 176
- ISBN: 0-7486-6160-3

The Thought Gang is the second novel by English author Tibor Fischer, published in 1994. According to the Bloomsbury Good Reading Guide (2003), it was 'one of the funniest and most imaginative novels of the last twenty years'.

== Plot introduction ==
Described by the complete review as 'a metaphysical thriller, combining bank robbery and high philosophy', it tells the unlikely tale of Eddie Coffin, an unemployed, overweight, alcoholic philosophy professor who flees Britain for France where he meets Hubert, a one-armed, one-legged thief. They join forces and embark on a bank-robbing spree through France.

== Reception ==
Although described by John Updike in The New Yorker as 'a textbook example of an author outsmarting himself', other reviews were more positive. Booklist describes it as 'a rollicking good time' and goes on to say of the author: 'He puns his way through a text that manages to be as witty and erudite as the late novels of Nabokov and every bit as extreme and satirical as Pulp Fiction. The Nation argues that it is 'most notable for the effortless way Fischer integrates philosophy – pages and pages of it – into the flow of the narrative. According to The Times it 'deserves to become a cult novel of the 1990s' and the complete review concludes with 'a very fine novel indeed'.
