= Under the Frog =

1992 novel by Tibor Fischer

- First US edition
- Author: Tibor Fischer
- Language: English
- Publisher: The New Press (US); Polygon Books (UK)
- Publication date: 1992
- Publication place: United Kingdom

Under the Frog is the 1992 debut novel of British writer Tibor Fischer. The book was a winner of the 1992 Betty Trask Award, and was shortlisted for the 1993 Booker Prize.

== Plot ==
The novel is a black comedy set in Hungary in the years immediately following the end of World War II and culminates in the 1956 uprising. Its protagonists are Gyuri, Pataki and several others, basketball players who dream of escaping their dead-end factory jobs, and travel to all their basketball gigs in the nude, even when this involves using public transport.

The book especially parodies the trumpeting of the "gains of socialism" by the regime, empty rhetoric which, Fischer suggests, all but the dimmest were able to see through even from the beginning.

== Meaning of the title ==
The title is taken from a Hungarian expression, "a béka segge alatt" used to describe any situation when things can't seem to get any worse: "under a frog's arse, down a coalmine".
