= Mika Launis =

Finnish illustrator and graphic designer (born 1949)

Mika Launis (born 1949) is a Finnish illustrator and graphic designer who studied graphic design at the University of Art and Design in Helsinki.

== Career ==
For his final project, he did the illustrations for a children's book written in Northern Sámi.

Launis has illustrated several books, mainly children's books. In addition, he has provided illustrations for book covers, of which his most well-known are probably the covers of the Finnish versions of the Harry Potter books. Some of his works have also been published as postage stamps.

Launis was the 1997 recipient of the Rudolf Koivu Award, which is awarded to illustrations in children's and young adult books. Furthermore, he won the competition to design Finland's first Euro postage stamp.

== Awards ==
- Suomalainen kuvakirjapalkinto (The Finnish Award for Illustrated Books) (1997)
- Rudolf Koivu Award (1997)
- short-listed for the Hans Christian Andersen Award (1998 and 2002)
