= Adele Faber =

American author (1928–2024)

- Born: January 12, 1928; New York City, U.S.
- Died: April 24, 2024 (aged 96); White Plains, New York, U.S.
- Education: B.A. in Theater & Drama, Queens College; M.A. in Education, New York University
- Children: 3
- Writing career
- Language: American English
- Genres: Parenting & Families
- Notable works: Liberated Parents/Liberated Children; How To Talk So Kids Will Listen & Listen So Kids Will Talk and Siblings Without Rivalry; How To Talk So Kids Can Learn - At Home and in School

Adele Faber (January 12, 1928 – April 24, 2024) was an American author. She wrote books about parenting and families and was an expert on communication between adults and children.

== Biography ==
Faber graduated from the Queens College with a B.A. in theater and drama and earned her master's degree in education from New York University. She also taught in the New York City High schools for eight years. Having studied with the late child psychologist, Dr. Haim Ginott, Faber was also a former member of the faculty of The New School for Social Research in New York and The Family Life Institute of Long Island University.

Faber later resided in Long Island, New York, and was mother to three children. She died in White Plains, New York, on April 24, 2024, at the age of 96.

== Bibliography ==
Books that Adele Faber has authored/co-authored, many of them intended for parents struggling to take care of their children, include:

- How to Talk So Kids Will Listen & Listen So Kids Will Talk
- Siblings Without Rivalry: How to Help Your Children Live Together So You Can Live Too
- How To Talk So Kids Can Learn
- How to Talk So Teens Will Listen and Listen So Teens Will Talk
- Liberated Parents, Liberated Children: Your Guide to a Happier Family
- How To Be The Parent You Always Wanted To Be
- Between Brothers and Sisters
- How to Talk So Kids Will Listen Book Summary
- Bobby and the Brockles Go to School
- Bobby and the Brockles

== See also ==
- Haim Ginott
- Elaine Mazlish
