= Elaine Mazlish =

American author and parent educator

Elaine Mazlish (31 March 1925 – 31 October 2017) was an American author, parent educator who wrote about helping parents and teachers to communicate better with children.

She also arranged various workshops based on the teachings in her books.

== Early life and education ==
Mazlish received a degree in theater arts from New York University. Before spending full time raising her three children she taught and developed drama programs for children in settlement houses in New York City.

== Career ==
Along with her co-author, Adele Faber, Mazlish was on the faculty of the New School for Social Research and the Family Life Institute of C.W. Post. Together, through workshops and books they disseminated the child-rearing philosophy of Dr. Haim Ginott.

== Notable works ==
- Liberated Parents, Liberated Children: Your Guide to a Happier Family (1973)
- How to Talk So Kids Will Listen & Listen So Kids Will Talk (1980)
- Siblings Without Rivalry: How to Help Your Children Live Together So You Can Live Too (1987)
- Between Brothers and Sisters (1989)
- How To Talk So Kids Can Learn (1994)
- How To Be The Parent You Always Wanted To Be (1992)
- How to Talk So Kids Can Learn at Home and in School (1995)

== Death ==
She died at the age of 92 on October 31, 2017.

== See also ==
- Adele Faber
- Dr. Haim Ginott
