= Viktor Golyshev =

Russian translator (born 1937)

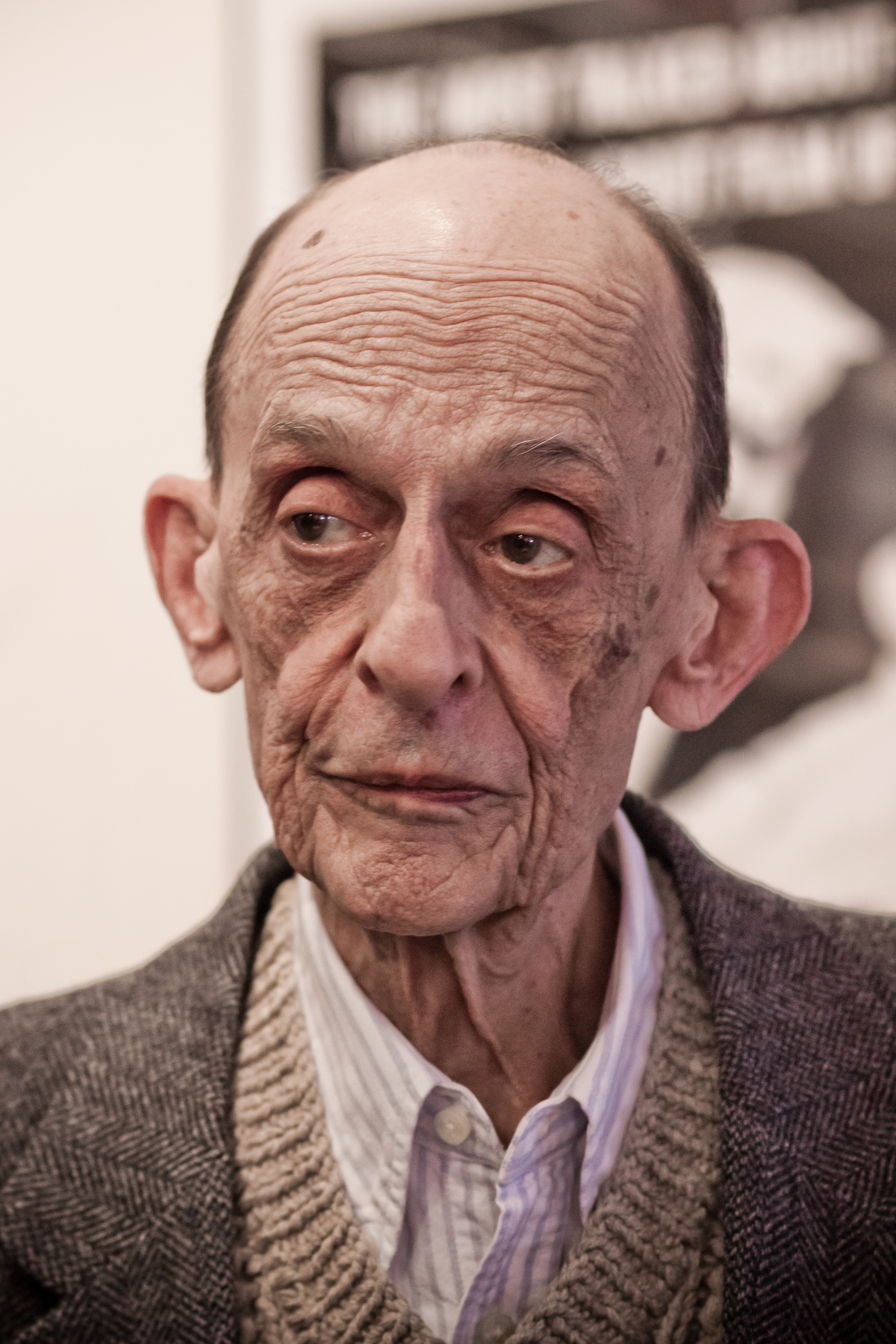

Viktor Petrovich Golyshev (Russian: Виктор Петрович Голышев; born April 26, 1937) is a well-known English-to-Russian translator. His translations include Light in August, One Flew Over the Cuckoo's Nest, All the King's Men, Theophilus North, 1984, Other Voices, Other Rooms, Set This House on Fire, Pulp, and others. He has won the Foreign Literature and Illuminator awards. He has said about modern American literature, "It isn't quite worthy of consideration. It has almost nothing to say about life."

== Harry Potter and the Order of the Phoenix ==
Golyshev initially scoffed at an offer to translate the fifth book in J. K. Rowling's bestselling series ("Hell no, what am I, 8 years old?"). However, he subsequently joined a team of translators employed by the Russian publisher of Harry Potter and the Order of the Phoenix after complaints of poor translation.

He has not been part of the translating team for any of the other Harry Potter books.
