= Andrzej Polkowski =

Polish translator (1939–2019)

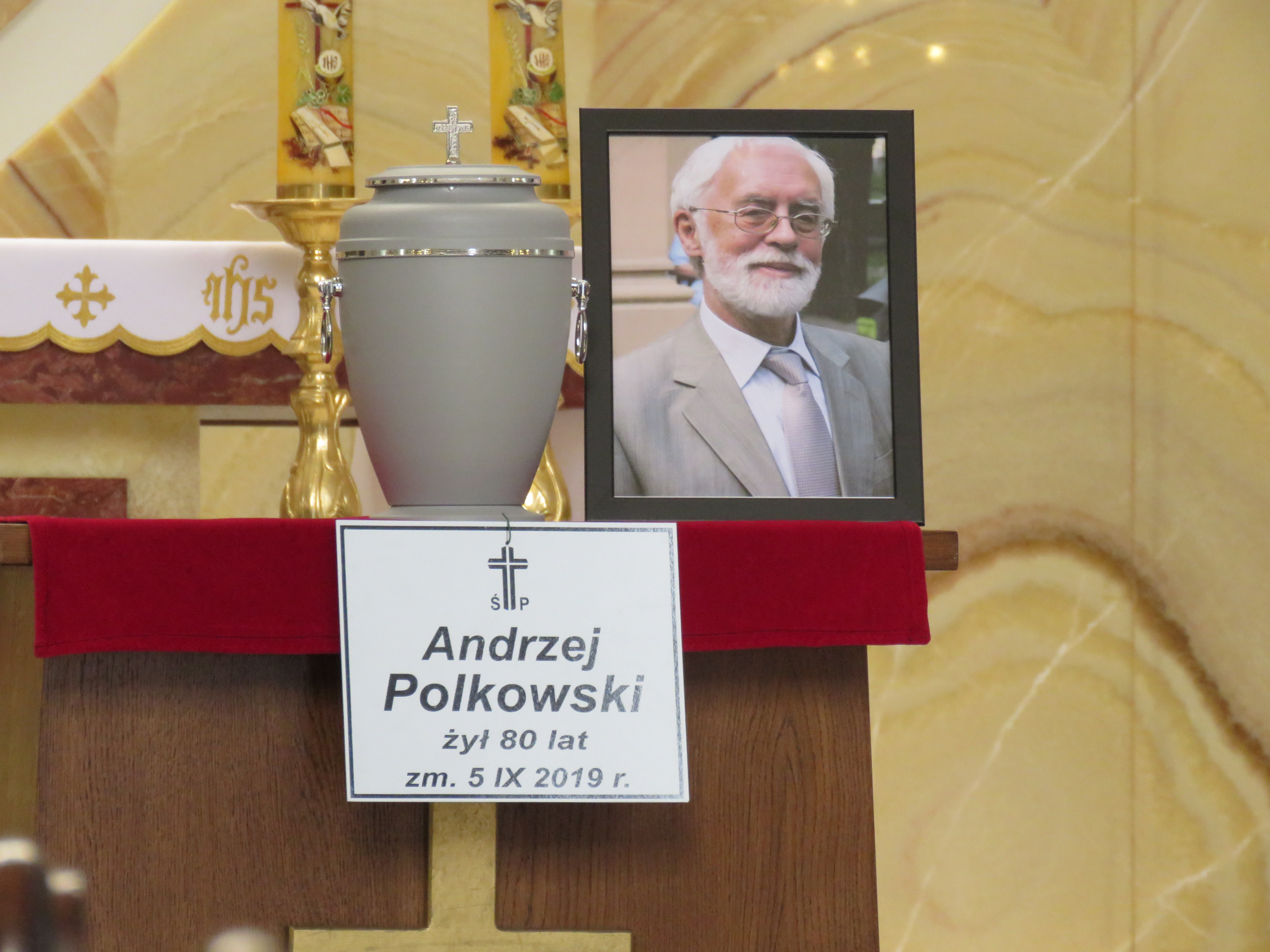
Andrzej Polkowski’s funeral.

Andrzej Polkowski (5 September 1939 – 5 September 2019) was a Polish translator. He translated around forty titles across several genres, including children's literature (including the Harry Potter series), fantasy, science fiction and history. He translated many publications for the Media Rodzina publishing house.
