= Styron =

Styron may refer to:

== Chemicals ==
- Styron (company), American plastics manufacturer, part of Dow Chemical Company
  - Styron, polystyrene resins by Dow Chemical Company
- Cinnamyl alcohol, an organic compound used in perfumery

== People ==
- Alexandra Styron, American author and professor
- Don Styron (born 1940), American athlete
- William Styron (1925–2006), American writer
- Susanna Styron (born 1955), American filmmaker
