= Sophie's Choice (opera) =

2002 opera by Nicholas Maw

Sophie's Choice is an opera by the British composer Nicholas Maw, with a libretto by the composer based on the novel of the same name by the American novelist William Styron. It was premiered on 7 December 2002 at the Royal Opera House, London.

== Background ==
Maw originally conceived the opera after seeing the film of Styron's novel (1982, directed by Alan J. Pakula). Styron recommended that Maw write the libretto himself, which took the composer six years. The premiere production at Covent Garden was directed by Trevor Nunn and conducted by Simon Rattle; Styron was in the audience. There had been concerns about the recalcitrant behaviour of some of the stage machinery as late as the dress rehearsal, but the premiere went perfectly from a technical point of view.

However, the critical reception of the opera was reserved. The critic of The Guardian, quoting the programme said "Life is messy, like masturbation", felt that the opera itself was "long" and "messy", and, whilst praising the individual performances, was deeply unimpressed with the production's attempts to evoke the atmosphere of Auschwitz concentration camp, and indifferent as to Maw's musical idiom. The critic Alex Ross felt that the production's treatment of the horrors of the Holocaust was "at the edge of the tolerable", and opined the libretto to be too wordy, especially in the opera's first half. Others were more enthusiastic. The Times wrote "The opera has magnificent music, ... worthy of comparison with Britten and Berg." Reviewing the BBC's live recording of the production, Christopher Ballantyne believed the opera to be "a work not just of serious purpose and great integrity, but one that makes a valiant effort to speak back to the unspeakable."

The opera was however felt to be very long (approaching 4 hours) and was cut to about 3 hours for its American premiere at Washington National Opera in September 2006, in which the leading roles were again taken by the singers of the London production. The production has also been shown at the Deutsche Oper Berlin and the Wiener Volksoper.

The BBC live broadcast was released on DVD in 2010, in commemoration of the composer's death the previous year.

== Roles ==
Role	Voice type	Premiere cast, (Conductor: Simon Rattle)
Sophie	mezzo-soprano	Angelika Kirchschlager
Wanda		Stephanie Friede
Yetta Zimmerman		Frances McCafferty
Nathan	baritone	Rodney Gilfry
Narrator	baritone	Dale Duesing
Stingo	tenor	Gordon Gietz
Zbigniew Bieganski	bass	Stafford Dean
Rudolf Hoess	tenor	Jorma Silvasti
Doctor	baritone	Alan Opie
Librarian		Adrian Clarke
Chorus

== Synopsis ==
The opera follows the novel closely, save that it introduces an older Stingo as the narrator of events. The young writer Stingo comes to know the beautiful Sophie and her lover Nathan in their lodging house in Brooklyn in 1947. The unstable relationship between Nathan and Sophie breaks down, with Sophie herself tormented by her horrific past, gradually revealed, in Auschwitz.

== Notes ==
=== Sources ===
- Ashley, Tim (2002). "Sophie's Choice", The Guardian, 9 December 2002, accessed 25 April 2015.
- Ballantine, Christopher (2010), "Sophie's Choice, Maw", in Opera, June 2010, p. 94. Website version accessed 25 April, 2015.
- Gurewitsch, Matthew (2010). "Maw: Sophie's Choice", Opera News, August 2010, on beyondcriticism website, accessed 25 April 2015
- Midgette, Anne (2006). "A Novel Transformed Into Opera, Its Heartbreaking Story Intact", The New York Times, 23 September 2006, accessed 25 April 2015.
- Ross, Alex (2003). "Opera As History", The New Yorker, 6 January 2003, on Alex Ross: The Rest is Noise website, accessed 25 April 2015.
- Smith, Tim (2002a). "Peabody's Maw braces for London premiere", in The Baltimore Sun, December 7 2002, accessed 25 April 2015.
- Smith, Tim (2002b). "No, not everyone admires `Sophie's Choice' ", in The Baltimore Sun, December 15 2002, accessed 25 April 2015.
