= Darkness Visible (memoir) =

Book by William Styron

Darkness Visible: A Memoir of Madness
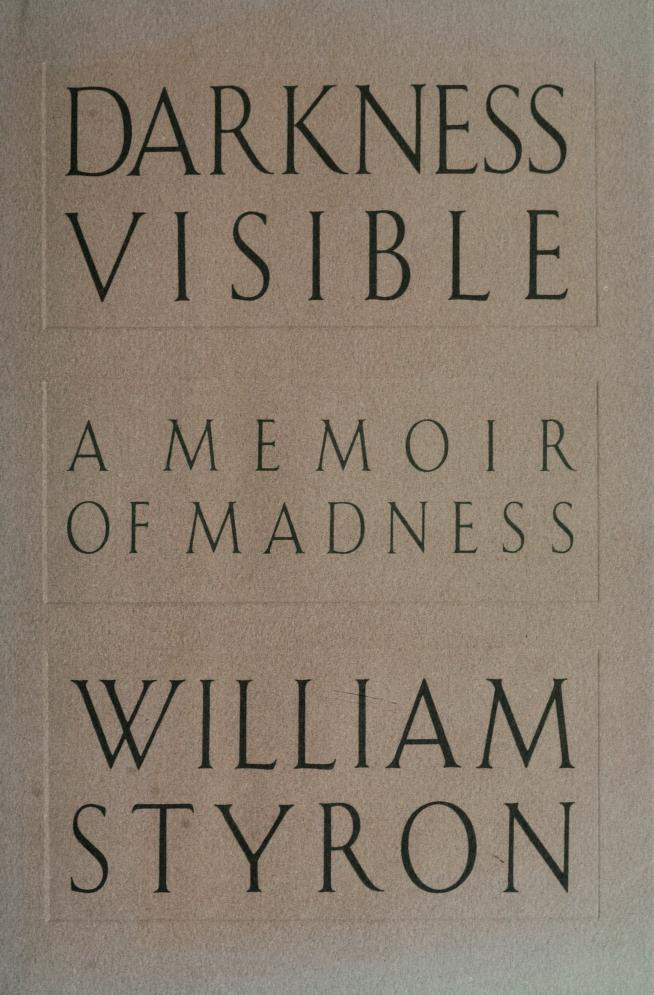
- First edition cover (1990)
- Author: William Styron
- Language: English
- Subject: Depression
- Genre: Memoir
- Publisher: Random House
- Publication date: 1990
- Publication place: United States
- Media type: Print (hardcover)
- Pages: 84
- ISBN: 0-394-58888-6
- Dewey Decimal: 616.85'27'0092
- LC Class: RC537.S88

Darkness Visible: A Memoir of Madness is a memoir by American writer William Styron about his descent into depression and the triumph of recovery. It is among the last books published by Styron and is among his most celebrated.

First published in December 1989 in Vanity Fair, the book grew out of a lecture that Styron originally delivered at a symposium on affective disorders at the Department of Psychiatry of the Johns Hopkins School of Medicine.

Through the employment of anecdotes, speculation, and reportage, Styron reflects on the causes and effects of depression, drawing links between his own illness and that of other writers and public figures.

== Summary ==
In October 1985, American author William Styron travels to Paris to receive the Prix mondial Cino Del Duca, a prestigious literary award. During the trip, Styron's mental state begins to degenerate rapidly as the depressive symptoms that he has been experiencing for several months worsened. He tentatively concludes that his depression was brought about by his sudden withdrawal from years of alcoholism and exacerbated by his overdependence on Halcion, a prescription drug that he took to treat insomnia. Styron also briefly mentions his own father's battle with depression and his mother's premature death from breast cancer, both of which he believes could have also contributed to his deteriorated state of mind.

As his depression becomes more severe, Styron seeks multiple treatment methods, including psychotherapy, consulting with a psychiatrist, and countless antidepressants, but to no avail. Initially, Styron is able to function better in the morning than in the afternoon and evening, but he soon struggles to even get out of bed. He eventually loses the ability to perform basic tasks such as driving and often contemplates suicide.

One night, after a particularly intense bout of suicidal ideation that culminates in him actively preparing to take his own life, Styron hears a passage from Brahms' Alto Rhapsody, to which he has a fiercely emotional response. He is suddenly repulsed at the idea of suicide and is compelled to eliminate his depression once and for all. The following day, Styron checks himself into a hospital, which he had previously avoided on the advice of his psychiatrist, who harbors a strong opposition to institutional treatment. It is ultimately at the hospital that Styron finally emerges from his depression and eventually makes a full recovery.

== Main figures ==
- William Styron is a renowned American author who, at sixty years of age, is afflicted by clinical depression. After many months of failed treatments and suicidal ideation, Styron is admitted to a hospital, where he recovers.
- Dr. Gold is William Styron's Yale-educated psychiatrist who prescribes a multitude of antidepressants to Styron, all of which prove to be ineffective. Throughout the memoir, Dr. Gold maintains a cold and distant demeanor and mostly resorts to repeating information from The Diagnostic and Statistical Manual of Mental Disorders. He is also antagonistic to hospitalization due to the high degree of stigma surrounding it.
- Rose Burgunder Styron is William Styron's wife who steadfastly supports him throughout his depressive episode.

== Themes ==
The most prevalent theme in Darkness Visible is how every individual afflicted by clinical depression ultimately has his or her own unique experience with the mental disorder. Styron repeatedly emphasizes how each person encounters different sets of physical and psychological symptoms, which can include persistent sadness, fatigue, insomnia, pain, self-harm, futility, lack of concentration, loss of pleasure in things and activities that were once enjoyed, and suicide ideation. He also discusses how every patient possesses a unique response to various treatments and how the success of a method on one individual does not guarantee its effectiveness on another. For example, Styron acknowledges that although psychotherapy and antidepressants did not successfully treat him, they are highly effectual in healing numerous others. He also expresses frustration at the stigma and ignorance surrounding depression, and frequently states that people cannot truly understand how devastating and destructive depression is until they experience it themselves.

Additionally, Styron stresses the importance of perseverance and taking initiative in seeking help and treatment for not only depression, but for any mental illness. The longer one keeps his or her ailment a secret out of either shame, fear, or apathy, the lower his or her chances of recovery will be, and the more likely he or she will succumb to the condition's symptoms, especially suicide.

Throughout the memoir, Styron discusses the effects of depression on the lives of several notable people, who range from accomplished authors such as Romain Gary (a close friend of Styron's), Randall Jarrell, Albert Camus, and Primo Levi (a chemist and Holocaust survivor) to prominent political figures such as U.S. President Abraham Lincoln and activist Abbie Hoffman. Styron also mentions Jean Seberg, an American actress who experienced severe depression herself and who was also Romain Gary's second wife. Many of these individuals eventually committed suicide. Through the connections he draws between his own experience with depression and that of the public figures he analyzes, Styron deduces that people with creative tendencies are ultimately more vulnerable to the disorder.

Styron also suggests alcohol withdrawal and benzodiazepine use as possible causes of his depression.

== Background and publication history ==
Upon learning of the significant amount of criticism and ignorance directed towards the suicide of Primo Levi, Styron wrote an op-ed for The New York Times in December 1988, maintaining that Levi ended his life not because of a lack of morality, but because of a real, dangerous illness that threatened the health and lives of many people. The op-ed garnered positive reception and compelled many readers to openly speak about their experiences with depression, ultimately inspiring Styron to begin documenting his own ordeal.

In May 1989, William Styron delivered a lecture about his experience with depression at a symposium for affective disorders at the Johns Hopkins School of Medicine. Several months later, he adapted the lecture into an essay and published it in the December 1989 issue of Vanity Fair. The following year, Random House published Styron's essay as a full-length memoir titled Darkness Visible, which included additional material that had been excluded from the original work due to limited space in Vanity Fair. For instance, Styron's account of his fateful trip to Paris in October 1985 was not included in the essay, but it was incorporated into Darkness Visible.

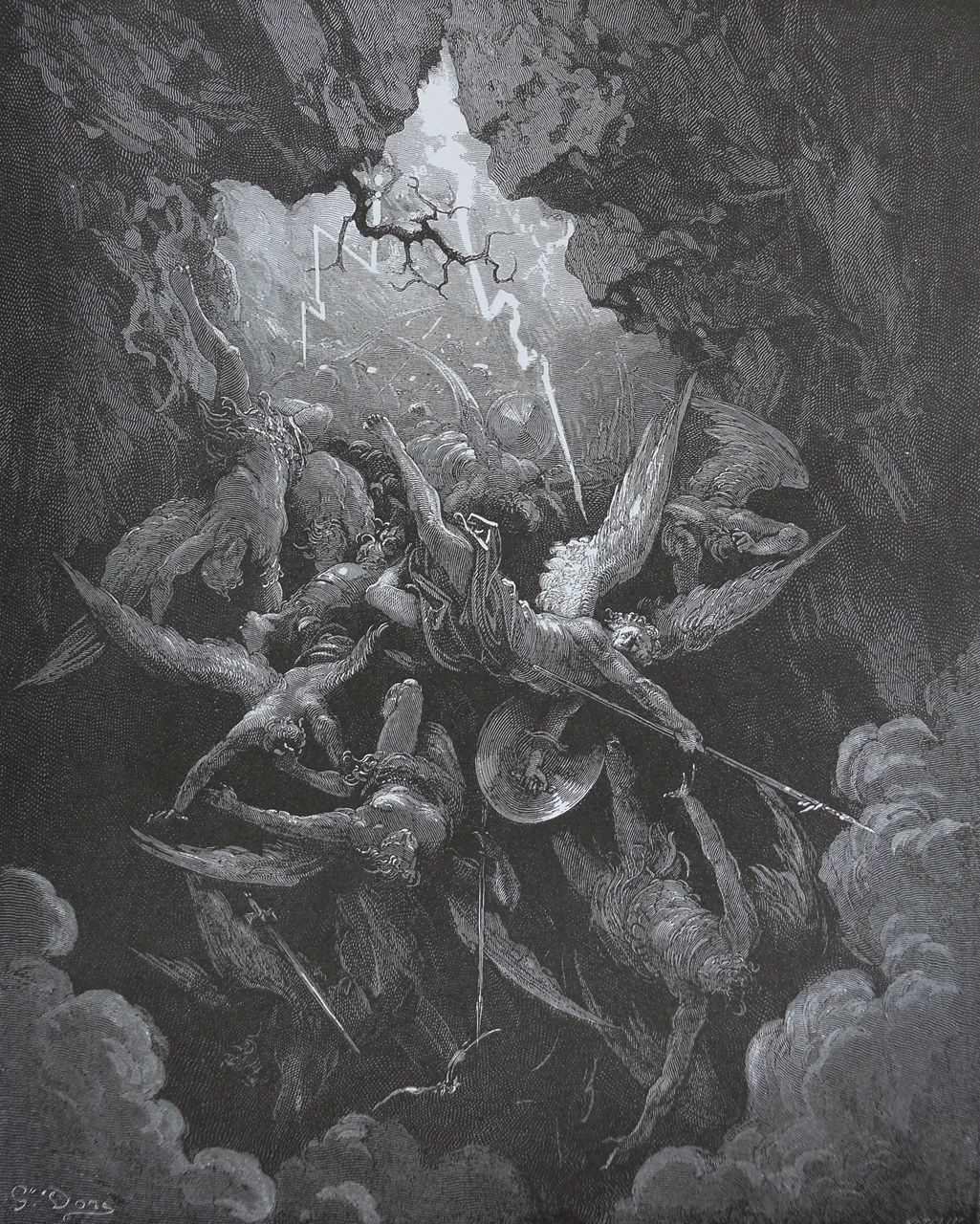
An illustration by Gustave Doré for John Milton's Paradise Lost, the latter from which William Styron drew inspiration for the title of his memoir

The title of the memoir originates from John Milton's description of Hell in Paradise Lost:

No light; but rather darkness visible
Served only to discover sights of woe,
Regions of sorrow, doleful shades, where peace
And rest can never dwell, hope never comes
That comes to all, but torture without end
Still urges, and a fiery deluge, fed
With ever-burning sulphur unconsumed.

== Critical reception ==
Upon its release, Darkness Visible received praise from critics and readers for eloquently yet frankly bringing awareness to clinical depression, a condition that was obscure yet prevalent among many people and highly stigmatized. In his review for The Washington Post, Anthony Storr lauded Darkness Visible as "a beautifully written, deeply moving, courageously honest account of an illness which is eminently treatable, but which often goes unrecognized." The Chicago Sun-Times conveyed similar praise in its description of Darkness Visible as "a chilling yet hopeful report from a mental wilderness into which one in ten Americans disappear...enlightening...fascinating." In its critique, The New York Times hailed Darkness Visible as "compelling...harrowing...a vivid portrait of a debilitating disorder...it offers the solace of shared experience." James Kaplan of Entertainment Weekly gave the memoir an A− and praised it for being a "moving and authoritative account." Kaplan also noted that although "Styron does much to dignify depression...[and] bring it out of the realm of unmentionable shame," he "failed to see...how the disease had been central to his whole existence."

Meanwhile, some critics were dissatisfied with the short length of Darkness Visible. People described the memoir as "either woefully incomplete or, at almost 100 pages, more than you would want to know about Styron's history of melancholia." People also criticized Styron for having "the same difficulty doctors do in defining depression and its causes." Kirkus Reviews expressed a similar sentiment in its review of Darkness Visible, which stated that the memoir should have been written "with more intense intimacy and searing detail." However, Kirkus Reviews still offered commendation by calling the memoir "gripping" and declaring, "...we feel that Styron has shown us...as much of his black pit as he can bear to show."

== Legacy ==
Darkness Visible is renowned for drawing attention to the treatment of clinical depression. According to Peter Fulham of The Atlantic, Styron was effectively able to portray depression, which was typically difficult to describe, and its devastating impacts on not only his own life, but on those of others also afflicted by the disorder. By doing so, he was able to eliminate a substantial amount of stigma surrounding depression, which encouraged individuals with the illness to share their experiences and seek help. Through his memoir, Styron ultimately served as a liaison between people with and without depression and as a leading advocate for mental health overall.
