= In from the Night =

- Genre: Drama
- Based on: If Nights Could Talk: A Family Memoir by Marsha Recknagel
- Screenplay by: Susanna Styron; Bridget Terry
- Directed by: Peter Levin
- Starring: Marcia Gay Harden; Taylor Handley; Thomas Gibson
- Theme music composer: Mark McKenzie
- Country of origin: United States
- Original language: English

Production
- Editor: Tina Hirsch
- Running time: 97 minutes

Original release
- Network: CBS
- Release: April 23, 2006

In from the Night (2006) is a Hallmark Hall of Fame film that premiered on CBS.

== Plot summary ==
A boy named Bobby arrives unexpectedly at his aunt Vicky's house. Vicky can tell by his eyes that he was abused. Bobby came to Vicky because the happiest memories of his childhood were with her. Vicky gives up her job as a big writer temporarily to help Bobby.

== Cast ==
- Marcia Gay Harden - Vicky Miller
- Taylor Handley - Bobby
- Thomas Gibson - Aiden Byrnes
- Kate Nelligan - Vera Miller
- Regina Taylor - Dr. A. Gardner
- MacKenzie Astin - Rob Miller
- Roxanne Hart - Ruth Miller Hammond
- Kevin Kilner - Chet Hammond
- Mageina Tovah - Priscilla Miller
- Nicholas Ballas - Abe Nolan
- Cody McMains - Tristan
- Miguel Perez - Ned Alvarez
- Lauren Tom - Dr. Myra Chen
- Ryan Donowho - Snakeman

== Reception ==
Brian Lowry, of Variety said: "Sensitively directed by Peter Levin, the script by Susanna Styron and Bridget Terry -- who last collaborated on Hallmark's lyrical "Back When We Were Grownups"—is devoid of real surprises. Inevitably, Bobby's reclamation—and its impact on Vicki's neatly ordered world—will surely have its own rewards, culminating in the by-now-familiar notion that family is what you make of it." Rob Hedalt, of The Free Lance-Star, said "Two things make the latest Hallmark film special: the fact that the hero is played by the superb actress Marcia Gay Harden. And the fact that her character, in many ways, is just as flawed as the nephew she tries to save." The film was reviewed by Chicago Tribune.

== Awards and nominations ==
In from the Night was nominated a Satellite Award for 'Best Motion Picture Made for Television' in 2006.
