= Shadrach (film) =

- DVD cover
- Directed by: Susanna Styron
- Written by: Based on the short story by William Styron; Screenplay by Susanna Styron & Bridget Terry
- Produced by: John Thompson; Boaz Davidson; Bridget Terry
- Starring: Harvey Keitel; Andie MacDowell
- Cinematography: Hiro Narita, A.S.C.
- Edited by: Colleen Sharp
- Music by: Van Dyke Parks
- Production company: Millennium Films
- Distributed by: Columbia Pictures
- Release date: September 23, 1998 (United States)
- Running time: 89 minutes
- Country: United States
- Language: English

Shadrach is a 1998 American film directed by Susanna Styron, based on a short story by her father William Styron, about a former slave's struggle to be buried where he chooses.

== Plot ==
Before the Civil War, the Dabney family of Virginia sold their slave, Shadrach (John Franklin Sawyer), to plantation owners in Alabama, separating him from his family. In 1935, during the Great Depression, Shadrach—at the age of 99—walks the 600 miles from his home in Alabama to the Dabney farm in Virginia. His one request is to be buried in the soil of the farm where he was born into slavery.

The farm is owned by the descendants of the Dabney family, consisting of Vernon (Keitel), Trixie (McDowell) and their seven children. But to bury a black man on that land is a violation of strict Virginia law, so the family goes through the arduous task of figuring out how to grant his request. Along the way they form a touching bond with the former slave and sharecropper, who has outlived both his former wives and some 35 children.

== Cast ==
- Harvey Keitel as Vernon
- Andie MacDowell as Trixie
- Monica Bugajski as Edmonia
- Deborah Hedwall as Mother
- Darrell Larson as Father
- Scott Terra as Paul
- Daniel Treat as Little Mole
- Jonathan Parks Jordan as Middle Mole
- Erin Underwood as Lucinda
- John Franklin Sawyer as Shadrach
- Martin Sheen as Narrator
- Muse Watson as Captain
- Edward Bunker as Joe Thornton

== Tagline ==
- "One man's journey changed another man's heart"

== Critical reception ==
Film critic Roger Ebert gave the film a mixed review, writing, "Shadrach is a well-meaning film, directed by Susanna Styron from her father's autobiographical story. But without diminishing Shadrach's own determination and dignity (evoked in a minimalist, whispering performance by first-time actor Sawyer), it indulges in a certain sentimentality that is hard to accept in the dark weather stirred up by Beloved. The movie even has Vernon Dabney wonder if the slaves weren't better off back when they had an assured place in the social order and got their meals on time; the movie does not adopt this view as its own and quietly corrects him. But I was left with a vision of Vernon trying to expound his theories to Sethe, the heroine of Beloved, who would rather have a child dead in freedom than alive in slavery."

Los Angeles Times film critic Kevin Thomas liked the film and wrote, "This flawless, deeply felt yet buoyant and graceful film marks Styron's feature directorial debut, after a varied career as a documentarian, writer and as an assistant to Ken Russell on Altered States and Luis Buñuel on That Obscure Object of Desire. That she herself has a Southern heritage, adapting (with Bridget Terry) her own celebrated father's story, surely gives the period-perfect Shadrach its special resonance.

A sympathetic New York Times review by Lawrence Van Gelder posited that "[I]n films like The Grass Harp and today's arrival, Shadrach, a generation raised in prosperity turns to a difficult past, suffuses it with a romantic glow and gazes with something like envy on its simple ways while tapping its people for insights into life's eternal verities, like death. On more than one level, the slight, sweet, sentimental Shadrach is a labor of love by Susanna Styron, the film's director and co-writer, from an autobiographical tale by her father, William Styron, published in Esquire in 1978."

Variety magazine film critic Emanuel Levy had problems with the screenplay in his review, writing, "Susanna Styron and Bridget Terry's script, which extends to the limits a narrative that is basically a small, simple and poignant story, suffers from being both literal and literary. Indeed, were it not for the foul language used by the white trash but decent father, Shadrach is the kind of well-intentioned picture that could easily have been made by Disney and comfortably play as an after-school special."

Reel Talk reviewer Donald Levit referred to the film's length as well as Martin Sheen's narration, "[R]unning times vary, from eighty-six to a hundred ten minutes, but even the latter, European print does not need this unseen presence looking back, setting scenes, and drawing a lesson learned (or not)."

== Evaluation in film guides ==
Videohound's Golden Movie Retriever (2011 edition) throws Shadrach 2½ bones (out of possible four), giving a plot overview and opining that "[D]irector Susanna Styron's lethargic adaptation of her father William's 1978 short story proves that the story should have stayed shorter than 90 minutes. Although the relatively small budget shows, the cast provides good performances".

Leonard Maltin's Movie Guide (2014 edition) has a higher opinion, giving the production 3 stars (out of 4) describing it as a "[N]icely realized film set in Virginia in 1935". Following a brief description of the plot, Maltin says of the title character, "[T]hough he's a stranger—and a strange presence indeed—the family feels compelled to help him. Kudos to first-time director Styron; the film is adapted from a short story by her father William".

Mick Martin's and Marsha Porter's DVD & Video Guide (2007 edition) goes still higher, dispensing 3½ stars (out of 5), describing it as a "[N]otable debut for filmmaker Susanna Styron, who coadapts father William Styron's short story…" The write-up ends with "[E]ven though the film never lacks sincerity, it does tend to skirt several important issues".

== Release and distribution ==
The film, originally distributed by Columbia Tri-Star Pictures, was initially released on September 23, 1998, on a limited basis with four showings in Wilmington, North Carolina, then quickly released to VHS home video and DVD by Sony Pictures. It was also shown at the Los Angeles Film Festival on April 16, 1998, and released internationally with showings in France, Finland, Spain and the United Kingdom, to generally positive critical reviews. Australian writers Paul Fischer and David Edwards were highly complimentary, with Fischer calling it "a beautifully complex masterpiece that has resonances with the likes of Grapes of Wrath, concluding that "Shadrach is an exquisite, detailed drama, beautifully made", and Edwards continuing in much the same vein, "[L]yrical and beautiful, it's one of those minor masterpieces that comes along all too rarely".
