= Set This House on Fire =

1960 novel by William Styron

- First edition
- Author: William Styron
- Language: English
- Publisher: Random House
- Publication date: June 3, 1960
- Publication place: United States
- Media type: Print (hardback & paperback)
- Pages: 507

Set This House on Fire is a novel by William Styron, set in a small village of the Amalfi coast in Italy, centred on the themes of evil and redemption. The narrator, Peter Leverett, is a lawyer from the South, but the story is primarily told through the recollections of its protagonist, a troubled artist named Cass Kinsolving.

== Plot introduction ==
The novel's title refers to a line from one of John Donne's epigraphs:

His mercies hath applied His judgments, and hath shaked the house, this body, with agues and palsies, and set this house on fire with fevers and calentures, and frightened the master of the house, which is my soul, with horrors, and heavy apprehensions, and so made an entrance into me.

This epigraph describes the basic theme of the novel: a troubled soul, the alcoholic Cass, is badly shaken by the "fire" of an encounter with evil, in the form of the aristocratic Mason Flagg. Ultimately, Cass' experiences with Flagg provide Cass with the inspiration he needs to redeem himself.

== Plot summary ==
The story takes place in Italy, not long after the Second World War. Young southern lawyer Peter Leverett is on vacation, and is thrilled to meet his old friend Mason Flagg on a film set in the town of Sambuco. Mason is a handsome, wealthy playboy with a glamorous life style. To Peter Leverett, a good-natured, rather gullible young man, he has always been a hero. But only a few hours after their reunion, Mason is found dead. For reasons of their own, the corrupt local police quickly label his death a suicide, but Peter suspects foul play. And to his horror and dismay, the main suspect is a fellow American named Cass Kinsolving.

Cass Kinsolving and Peter Leverett are both southerners, but strikingly different in appearance, behavior, and social background. Mild-mannered Peter is from relatively comfortable circumstances in Virginia, while brutal, profane, violent Cass was raised in grinding poverty in rural North Carolina. Their first meeting in the town of Sambuco does not bode well for their friendship, as Cass is falling-down drunk and rudely spewing threats towards Mason Flagg and his wealthy Hollywood friends. Peter is disgusted by him at the time, but some months later he begins to be troubled by the sense that brooding, enigmatic Cass Kinsolving may know something about Mason's death. Even more disturbing are the nightmares and memories that torment Peter. Recalling various unpleasant scenes from his schooldays, he begins to wonder what horrible crimes Mason may have committed to draw down the wrath of divine justice. Finally he takes action, writing to Cass in Charleston and begging for a chance to talk about the murder and other strange events in Italy. The bulk of the novel takes the form of conversations and flashbacks that take place between the two men as they talk over past events while fishing on a lake near Charleston, South Carolina.

"What this country needs... what this great land of ours needs is something to happen to it. Something ferocious and tragic, like what happened to Jericho or the cities of the plain - something terrible I mean, son, so that when the people have been through hellfire and the crucible, and have suffered agony enough and grief, they’ll be people again, human beings, not a bunch of smug contented cows rooting at the trough." - William Styron, from Set This House on Fire

== Characters ==
- Peter Leverett – a mild-mannered lawyer from Virginia
- Mason Flagg – a dashing, cynical millionaire playboy
- Cass Kinsolving – a brutal, profane, alcoholic painter from the Deep South
- Poppy – Cass's petite, long-suffering wife and the mother of his chaotic brood of children
- Rosemarie – Mason's buxom, sexy girlfriend in Italy
- Francesca – a desperately poor, beautiful peasant girl who is raped and murdered
- Luigi – an urbane, thoughtful Italian police officer

== Major themes ==
Like most of Styron's works, Set This House on Fire is concerned with sex and death, as well as with aspects of Styron's personal life—in this case, the experience of growing up in Newport News, Virginia.

== Literary significance and criticism ==
The novel was a success in France, but received mixed reviews in the US, some of which, such as the New York Times and The New Yorker, criticized its supposed heavy-handedness (particularly in the character of Luigi, a police-officer-cum-philosopher) and slow pacing, thought to detract from the writing. Kirkus Reviews was more favorable, saying that the book was "a complex, ambitious book which sets out to explore the limits and varieties of good and evil and in the process presents a picture of recent American life which is drawn in compelling detail and with strong authority."
