= Sophie's Choice (novel) =

1979 novel by William Styron

- First edition
- Author: William Styron
- Language: English
- Genre: Tragedy
- Publisher: Random House
- Publication date: 1979
- Publication place: United States
- Pages: 562
- ISBN: 0-394-46109-6
- OCLC: 4593241

Sophie's Choice is a 1979 novel by American author William Styron, the author's last novel. It concerns the relationships among three people sharing a boarding house in Brooklyn: Stingo, a young aspiring writer from the South; Jewish scientist Nathan Landau; and the latter's eponymous lover Sophie, a Polish-Catholic survivor of the German Nazi concentration camps, whom Stingo befriends.

Sophie's Choice won the US National Book Award for Fiction in 1980. The novel was the basis of a 1982 film of the same name. It was controversial for the way in which it framed Styron's personal views regarding the Holocaust.

== Synopsis ==
Stingo, a novelist who is recalling the summer when he began his first book, has been fired from his low-level reader's job at the publisher McGraw-Hill and has moved into a cheap boarding house in Brooklyn, where he hopes to devote some months to his writing. While working on his novel, he is drawn into the lives of the lovers Nathan Landau and Sophie Zawistowska, fellow boarders at the house, who are involved in an intense and difficult relationship. The beautiful Sophie is Polish, Catholic, and a survivor of the Holocaust and Nazi concentration camps and Nathan is Jewish-American and purportedly a genius. Although Nathan claims to be a Harvard graduate and a cellular biologist with a pharmaceutical company, it is revealed that this story is a fabrication. Almost no one—including Sophie and Stingo—knows that Nathan has paranoid schizophrenia and that he is abusing stimulants. He sometimes behaves quite normally and generously, but there are times when he becomes frighteningly jealous, violent, abusive, and delusional.

As the story progresses, Sophie tells Stingo of her past. She describes her violently antisemitic father, a law professor in Kraków; her unwillingness to help him spread his ideas; her arrest by the Nazis; and particularly her brief stint as a stenographer-typist in the home of Rudolf Höss, the commander of Auschwitz, where she was interned. She specifically relates her attempts to seduce Höss to persuade him that her blond, blue-eyed, German-speaking son should be allowed to leave the camp and enter the Lebensborn program, in which he would be raised as a German child. She failed in this attempt and ultimately never learned of her son's fate. Only at the end of the book does the reader learn what became of Sophie's daughter, Eva.

Eventually, Nathan's delusions lead him to believe that Stingo is having an affair with Sophie, and he threatens to kill them both. As Sophie and Stingo attempt to flee New York, Sophie reveals her deepest secret: On the night that she arrives at Auschwitz, a camp doctor makes her choose which of her two children will die immediately by gassing and which would continue to live, albeit in the camp. Of her two children, Sophie chose to sacrifice her eight-year-old daughter, Eva, in a decision that has left her in mourning and filled with a guilt that she cannot overcome. By now alcoholic and deeply depressed, Sophie is willing to self-destruct with Nathan, who has already tried to persuade her to die by suicide with him. Despite Stingo proposing marriage and a shared night that relieves Stingo of his virginity and fulfills many of his sexual fantasies, Sophie disappears, leaving only a note in which she says that she must return to Nathan.

Upon arriving back in Brooklyn, Stingo is devastated to discover that Sophie and Nathan have killed themselves by ingesting sodium cyanide.

== Themes and inspirations ==
=== Themes ===
Sylvie Mathé notes that Styron's "position" in the writing of this novel was made clear in his contemporary interviews and essays, in the latter case, in particular "Auschwitz", "Hell Reconsidered", and "A Wheel of Evil Come Full Circle", and quotes Alvin Rosenfeld's summary of Styron's position, where Rosenfeld states that:

(1) while [Styron] acknowledges Jewish suffering under the Nazis, he insists on seeing Auschwitz in general or universalistic terms, as a murderous thrust against "mankind" or "the entire human family"; (2) in line with the above, he sees his own role as "correcting" the view that the Holocaust was directed solely or exclusively against the Jews by focusing attention on the many Christians, and particularly the Slavs, who also perished in the camps; (3) … Auschwitz was "anti-Christian" as well as "anti-Semitic", and hence assertions of Christian guilt are misplaced and perhaps even unnecessary; (4) since he rejects historical explanations of Christian anti-Semitism as causative, Styron is drawn to the view, set forth by Richard Rubenstein and others … that in its essential character Auschwitz was a capitalistic slave society as much as or even more than it was an extermination center; and (5) viewed against European examples of barbarism and slavery, epitomized by Auschwitz, the American South's treatment of the blacks looks pretty good and "… seems benevolent by comparison".

Rosenfeld, summarizing, states, "The drift of these revisionist views, all of which culminate in Sophie's Choice, is to take the Holocaust out of Jewish and Christian history and place it within a generalized history of evil." Mathé reinforces Rosenfeld's conclusion with a quote from Styron himself, who noted in his "Hell Reconsidered" essay that "the titanic and sinister forces at work in history and in modern life… threaten all men, not only Jews." She goes on to note that Styron's choices to represent these ideas, and to incorporate them so clearly into the narrative of his novel, resulted in polemic and controversy that continued, at least into the early years of the new millennium.

=== Plot inspiration ===
Sophie's Choice is said to have been partly based on the author's time in Brooklyn, where he met a refugee from Poland, and he is said to have visited Auschwitz while researching the novel.

Alexandra Styron, the author's daughter, published the following account in The New Yorker in 2007:

Sophie had come to him in a dream, Daddy always said. Not much older than I am now, he had woken up in Connecticut and been unable to shake the image of a woman he once knew. She’d lived above him in Flatbush, in the boarding house he immortalized as Yetta Zimmerman’s Pink Palace. She was a Holocaust survivor, as evidenced by her wrist tattoo, Polish and beautiful, but more than that he didn’t know. Her boyfriend was American, but undistinguished. After the book came out, I used to answer the phone at home so my father wouldn’t have to. More than once, women with heavy accents explained the nature of their call in tearful and dramatic tones. “Daddy,” my notes would read, “a lady called. I can’t spell her name. She says she’s Sophie.” And a number somewhere in Michigan, or New Jersey.

A central element of the novel's plot, the personally catastrophic choice referred to in the title, is said to have been inspired by a story of a Romani woman who was ordered by the Nazis to select which of her children was to be murdered, which Styron attributes to Hannah Arendt's Eichmann in Jerusalem. However, Ira Nadel claims that the story is found in Arendt's The Origins of Totalitarianism. In that book, Arendt argues that those who ran the camps perpetrated an "attack on the moral person":

Totalitarian terror achieved its most terrible triumph when it succeeded in cutting the moral person off from the individualist escape and in making the decisions of conscience absolutely questionable and equivocal. (...) Who could solve the moral dilemma of the Greek mother, who was allowed by the Nazis to choose which of her three children should be killed?

Arendt cites Albert Camus' Twice a Year (1947) for the story, without providing a pinpoint reference.

== Reception and controversies ==
=== Awards and recognition ===
Sophie's Choice won the U.S. National Book Award for Fiction in 1980. (Note: This was the 1980 award for hardcover general Fiction, see National Book awards website. The National Book Awards there given for both hardcover and paperback in most categories from 1980 to 1983 and for multiple fiction categories, especially in 1980. See "1980 National Book Awards Winners and Finalists, The National Book Foundation". www.nationalbook.org.) Much later, in 2002, Styron would receive the Auschwitz Jewish Center Foundation's Witness to Justice Award.

=== Critical reception ===
In his review of the novel in the New York Times, John Gardner takes it as an example of Southern Gothic, writing that:

[It] is a splendidly written, thrilling book, a philosophical novel on the most important subject of the 20th century. If it is not, for me, a hands-down literary masterpiece, the reason is that, in transferring the form of the Southern Gothic to this vastly larger subject, Styron has been unable to get rid of or even noticeably tone down those qualities—some superficial, some deep—in the Southern Gothic that have always made Yankees squirm.

=== Controversies ===
==== At publication ====
Sophie's Choice generated significant controversy at time of its publication. Sylvie Mathé notes that Sophie's Choice, which she refers to as a "highly controversial novel", appeared in press in the year following the broadcast of the NBC miniseries Holocaust (1978), engendering a period in American culture where "a newly-raised consciousness of the Holocaust was becoming a forefront public issue." Mathé says:

Styron's ideological and narrative choices in his framing of a novel touching upon the "limit events" of Auschwitz, considered by many to lie beyond the realm of the imagination… spurred a polemic… which, twenty-five years later, is far from having died down.

(By "limit event" the author is referring to the nature of, and magnitude and violence of acts in, the Holocaust, characteristics of that "event" that challenged the civilizing tendencies of and the foundations of legitimacy for the moral and political fabric that defined its affected communities.)

The controversy to which Mathé is specifically referring arises from a thematic analysis which—in apparent strong consensus (e.g., see Rosenfeld's 1979 work, "The Holocaust According to William Styron")—has Styron, through the novel, his interviews, and essays:

- Acknowledging Jewish suffering during the Holocaust, while attempting to reorient public perception away from Nazi war crimes and genocides being solely aimed against the Jews and towards also acknowledging the experiences of Slavs, anti-Nazi Christians, political dissidents, and the disabled (hence Sophie's ethnicity and Catholic upbringing); that is, it has him insisting on seeing Auschwitz in particular in more universal terms as "a murderous thrust against 'the entire human family.'" Styron further extends his argument, again with controversy:
- Proposing that this more general view of the barbarism of Auschwitz (and in particular the fact that Slavic peoples and Christians were also caught up in its program of forced labour and extermination) disproves the unsupported/irrational/bigoted idea of universal Christian collective guilt and challenges historical arguments blaming all previous Christian anti-Semitism as the real cause of the Holocaust, and
- Suggesting that concentration camps, in using slave labour, justifies the comparison of Nazi war crimes (e.g., in the writings of Rubenstein) with the American institution of slavery and allowed the latter to be viewed as the less inhumane institution of the two.

Speaking of Styron's views as set forth in the novel and his nonfiction work, Rosenfeld refers to them as "revisionist views" that "culminate in Sophie's Choice" with an aim to "take the Holocaust out of Jewish and Christian history and place it within a generalized history of evil", and it is this specific revisionist thrust that is the substance of the novel's initial and persisting ability to engender controversy.

==== Other aspects of global controversy ====
Sophie's Choice was banned by the Goskomizdat agency as part of censorship in the Soviet Union, and was likewise banned by the censors in the Communist People's Republic of Poland for "its unflinching portrait of Polish anti-Semitism" in the interwar Second Polish Republic and in the postwar Soviet Bloc.

Sophie's Choice was banned by censors working for the government of South Africa under apartheid in November 1979, for being a sexually explicit work. It has also been banned in some high schools in the United States. For instance, the book was pulled from the La Mirada High School Library in California by the Norwalk-La Mirada High School District in 2002 because of a parent's complaint about its sexual content. However, a year after students had protested and the American Civil Liberties Union (ACLU) had sent a letter to the school district requesting that the district reverse its actions, students were again given access to the book in the school library.

== Adaptations ==
=== Film ===
The novel was made into a film of the same name in the United States, in 1982. Written and directed by Alan J. Pakula, the film was nominated for Academy Awards for its screenplay, musical score, cinematography, and costume design, and Meryl Streep received the Academy Award for Best Actress for her performance of the title role.

=== Opera ===
The British composer Nicholas Maw wrote an opera based on the novel, which was premiered at the Royal Opera House in London in 2002, and has also been performed in Washington, Berlin and Vienna.

== Publication history and related works ==
=== Selected publication history ===
- Styron, William (1979) Sophie's Choice, New York, NY: Random House, ISBN 0-394-46109-6 and ISBN 978-0-394-46109-0. Accessed 2 May 2023.
- —. (1998) [1979] Sophie's Choice (Modern Library 100 Best Novels Series; reprint, revised), New York, NY: Modern Library, ISBN 0-679-60289-5. Accessed 2 May 2023.
- —. (2004) [1979] Sophie's Choice (Vintage Classics; reprint), London, England: Vintage, ISBN 0-09-947044-6 and ISBN 978-0-09-947044-1. Accessed 2 May 2023.
- —. (2010) [1979] Sophie's Choice (authorized e-book), New York, NY: Open Road Media, ISBN 1-936317-17-6 and ISBN 978-1-936317-17-2. Accessed 2 May 2023.

=== Styron's related works ===
The following of Styron's works have been collected, per Sylvie Mathé, as relevant to the author's philosophical framework with regard to his constructing the history and characters within his novel.

- Styron, William (1974) "Auschwitz," In This Quiet Dust and Other Writings, 1993 [1982], pp. 336–339, New York, NY: Vintage.

- —. (1978) "Hell Reconsidered," In This Quiet Dust and Other Writings, 1993 [1982], pp. 105–115, New York, NY: Vintage.

- —. (1997) "A Wheel of Evil Come Full Circle: The Making of Sophie's Choice," The Sewanee Review (Summer), Vol. 105, No. 3, pp. 395–400.
- —. (1999) Afterword to Sophie's Choice, pp. 601–606, New York, NY: Modern Library.

== See also ==
- The Holocaust in popular culture
- Le Monde's 100 Books of the Century
