= The Long March (novel) =

1952 novella by William Styron

- First edition
- Author: William Styron
- Language: English
- Publisher: Discovery (serial); Random House (book)
- Publication date: 1952 (serial); October 1956 (book)
- Publication place: United States
- Media type: Print
- Pages: 88

The Long March is a novella by William Styron, first published serially in 1952 in Discovery. and by Random House as a Modern Library Paperback in 1956.

== Subject ==
It tells of an overnight thirty-six mile forced march back to base at a US Marine training camp in the Carolinas, the chief protagonists being ageing reservists Lieutenant Culver and his friend Captain Mannix, who have been called up due to the threat of the Korean War. Eight of their colleagues had, earlier that day, been killed by misfired mortar shells, adding to the absurdity of their ordeal.

== Inspiration ==
Styron himself was called up in response to the Korean War and a forced march he undertook at Camp Lejeune in Jacksonville, North Carolina provided the inspiration for the story.

== Theme ==
Writing in The Guardian, James Campbell explains, "The book expresses Styron's dislike of the military experience and must originally have appeared as a reproof to more bullish colleagues such as Norman Mailer and James Jones who, while exposing the brutality of battle, did so in such a way as to aggrandise it. "None of that Hemingway crap for me," says the hero of The Long March, Captain Mannix, with whom Styron has identified himself."
