= Rose Styron =

American poet and human rights activist

Rose Burgunder Styron (born April 4, 1928) is an American poet, journalist, and human rights activist. She is a founding member of Amnesty International USA, becoming a board member in 1970.

Styron is the subject of the documentary In the Company of Rose, directed by James Lapine, which debuted in 2022. Her most recent book is a memoir, Beyond This Harbor, published in 2023.

== Early life and education ==
Rose Burgunder Styron was born in Baltimore, Maryland, in 1928, where she spent her childhood. The daughter of B. B. Burgunder (father) and Selma Kann, (mother), her family's heritage was German Jewish, though it was described as a secular, non-observant Jewish household. She attended grade school at the Quaker Friends School of Baltimore.

Burgunder attended Wellesley College, where she graduated in 1950 with a Bachelor of Arts Degree. She was Class Poet and won Wellesley's John Masefield Prize for "the best poem written by a member of the senior class." Next, she earned her MFA at Johns Hopkins University, where she met her future husband, novelist William Styron, when she attended a reading he was giving. Burgunder said that, for her, this first meeting was not memorable. During the spring semester of 2009, Styron served as a Fellow at the Harvard Kennedy School Institute of Politics.

== Career as a human rights activist ==
Rose Styron joined Amnesty International USA in 1970, after attending a writer's conference in Moscow and Tashkent. She has chaired PEN’s Freedom-to-Write Committee and the Robert F. Kennedy Human Rights Award, and has served on the boards of the Academy of American Poets, the Association to Benefit Children, and the Brain and Creativity Institute at the University of Southern California. Styron is a fellow at the Kennedy Institute of Politics and was on the Council on Foreign Relations.

Styron’s 2023 memoir Beyond This Harbor is partly about her work as an activist, which involved traveling around the world, working to free prisoners of conscience. Writing about Styron’s memoir, Harvey Wasserman describes it as being, in part, “a harrowing travelogue through eastern Europe and southeast Asia to the unspeakable travesties of our own horrific prisons and the infuriating hypocrisies of our worst politicians.”

== Writing career ==
Styron is the author of four volumes of poetry. She has known that poetry was her deepest calling since the age of 9. Styron has worked as a translator on two books of Russian poetry, and has been a contributor to various other writing projects. These include interviews, book reviews, and essays for American Poetry Review, The Paris Review, Ramparts, and The New York Times.

As a journalist, Styron has published articles on human rights and foreign policy in many magazines, newspapers, and journals. Some of the publications include The New York Review of Books, The Nation, and The New Republic.

As an "upholder of her husband's legacy," after William Styron’s death in 2006, she edited The Selected Letters of William Styron, a project that was a two-year commitment.

Rose Styron was finally able to assemble a new book of her own poems, Fierce Day, published in 2015. It was her first new volume of poems since By Vineyard Light appeared in 1995. She says: "I became obsessed with helping to change antihuman policies abroad. I stopped writing poetry. For twenty years."

== Personal life ==
In 1952, while doing a fellowship at the American Academy in Rome, Burgunder renewed a passing acquaintance with a young novelist, William Styron, who had just won the Rome Prize for his novel Lie Down in Darkness. For their first date, they were chaperoned by Truman Capote. Before the date was over, Capote told Styron that he needed to marry this woman.

They were married in Rome in the spring of 1953. Together, they had four children: daughter Susanna Styron is a film director; daughter Paola is an internationally acclaimed modern dancer; daughter Alexandra Styron is a writer, known for the 2001 novel All The Finest Girls and her memoir Reading My Father published in 2011; and son Thomas is a professor of clinical psychology at Yale University.

Rose Styron raised her family in Roxbury, Connecticut, but they often spent extended summers on Martha’s Vineyard where she now permanently resides.

== Selected bibliography ==
Poetry volumes

- From Summer to Summer (Viking Press, 1965)
- Thieves’ Afternoon (Viking Press, 1972)
- By Vineyard Light (Rizzoli, 1995)
- Fierce Day (Friesen Press, 2015)

Memoir

- Beyond This Harbor: Adventurous Tales of the Heart (Alfred A. Knopf, 2023)

Translator

- Modern Russian Poetry. translated by Olga Andreyev Carlisle and Rose Styron
- Poets on Street Corners – Portraits of Fifteen Russian Poets (Random House, 1968)

Editor

- The Selected Letters of William Styron. w/ R. Blakeslee Gilpin (Random House, 2012)

Contributor

- Report on Torture (Farrar, Straus and Giroux, 1975)
- Letters to My Father (Louisiana State University Press, 2009)
- Unholy Ghost: Writers on Depression, edited by Nell Casey, (Harper Collins, 2002)
- Women Of Martha's Vineyard (History Press Library Editions, 2013)
