= Angelika Kirchschlager =

Austrian opera singer

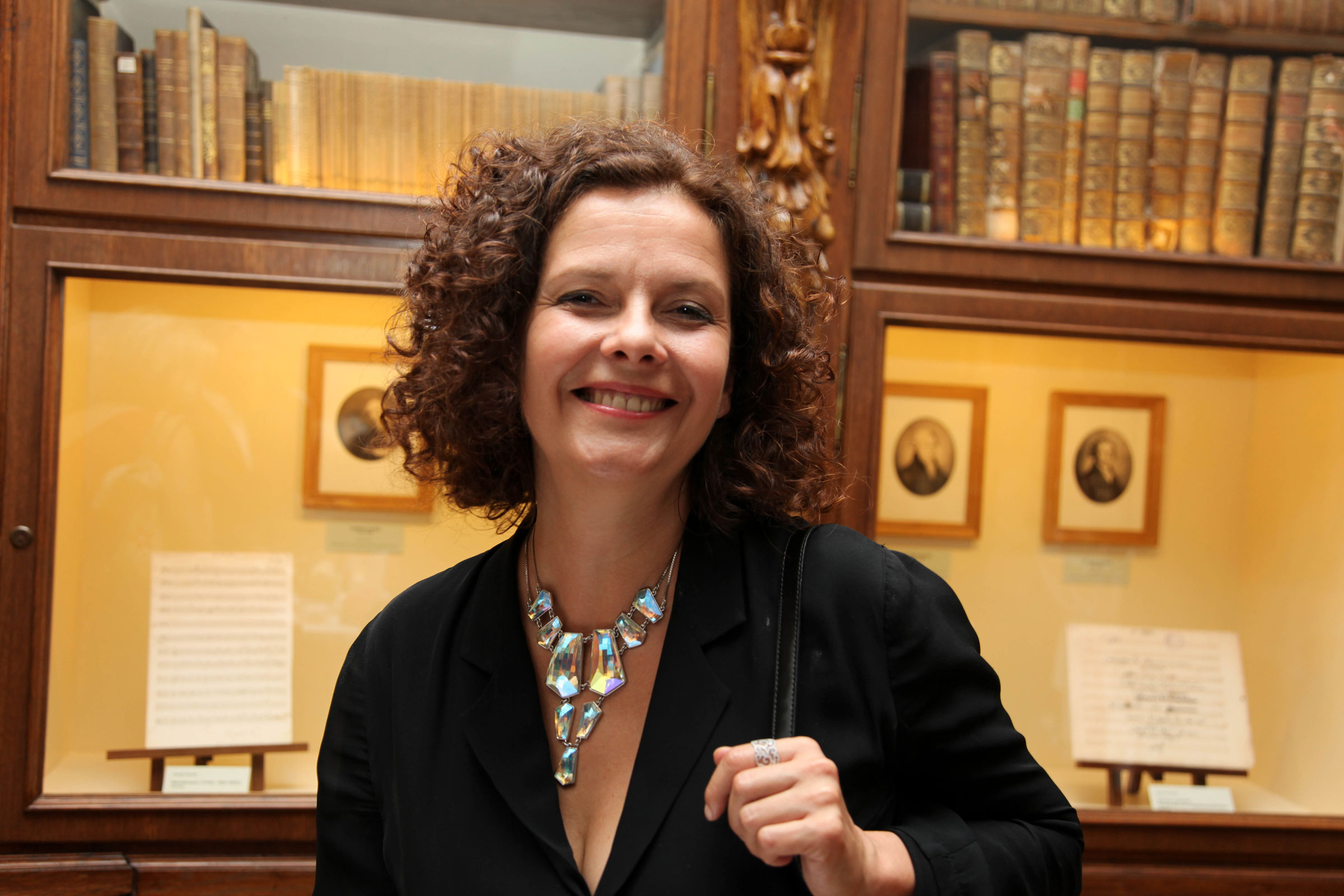
- Angelika Kirchschlager in 2010
- Born: 24 November 1965 (age 59); Salzburg, Austria
- Occupation: Operatic mezzo-soprano
- Years active: 1993–present
- Organisation: Vienna State Opera
- Spouse: Hans Peter Kammerer (separated)
- Children: Felix Kammerer

Angelika Kirchschlager (born 24 November 1965, Salzburg) is an Austrian mezzo-soprano opera and lieder singer.

== Career ==
Kirchschlager began her musical training at the Mozarteum in Salzburg, where she studied percussion and piano. In 1984, she went to the Vienna Music Academy, where she studied with Gerhard Kahry and Walter Berry. Her first engagements were at the Wiener Kammeroper and the Graz Opera. Kirchschlager won 1st Prize together with Morenike Fadayomi in Wien's international Operncafé HArtauer-COmpetition and third prize in the International Hans Gabor Belvedere Singing Competition both in 1991. Her stage debut was in Graz in 1993 as Octavian (Der Rosenkavalier). In 1993, she became a member of the Vienna State Opera, and made her debut there as Cherubino (The Marriage of Figaro). Also in 1993, she was awarded the Mozartinterpretationspreis of the Mozart Society of Vienna.

In 2002, Kirchschlager sang the role of Sophie in the world première of Nicholas Maw's opera Sophie's Choice at the Royal Opera House in London, the American premiere of the revised version of the opera at the Washington Opera, and the Austrian premiere at Volksoper Wien. She is a regular guest of the annual Lieder festival Schubertiade Schwarzenberg in Vorarlberg, Austria. Her regular collaborators include Helmut Deutsch and Simon Keenlyside.

Kirchschlager resides in Vienna. She has a son, the actor Felix Kammerer, from her marriage to the baritone Hans Peter Kammerer. Kirchschlager and Kammerer are currently separated.

In 2024, Kirchschlager announced that she is retiring from the stage to devote herself entirely to her professorship for song, oratorio and concert at the Vienna University of Music and Performing Arts.

== Roles ==
- Annio (La clemenza di Tito)
- Cherubino (Le nozze di Figaro)
- The Composer (Ariadne auf Naxos)
- Dorabella (Così fan tutte)
- Idamante (Idomeneo)
- Lauretta (Gianni Schicchi)
- Mélisande (Pelléas et Mélisande)
- Niklausse/Muse (The Tales of Hoffmann)
- Octavian (Der Rosenkavalier)
- Orlofsky (Die Fledermaus)
- Rosina (Il barbiere di Siviglia)
- Sesto (Giulio Cesare)
- Silla (Palestrina)
- Sophie (Sophie's Choice by Nicholas Maw)
- Valencienne (Die lustige Witwe)
- Zerlina (Don Giovanni)
- Hänsel (Hänsel und Gretel)
- Carmen (Carmen)
- Ariodante (Ariodante)
- Clairon (Capriccio)
- Jenny (Aufstieg und Fall der Stadt Mahagonny)
