= Nicholas Maw =

British composer (1935–2009)

Nicholas Maw

John Nicholas Maw (5 November 1935 – 19 May 2009) was a British composer. Among his works are the operas The Rising of the Moon (1970) and Sophie's Choice (2002).

== Biography ==
Born in Grantham, Lincolnshire, Maw was the son of Clarence Frederick Maw and Hilda Ellen Chambers. He attended the Wennington School, a boarding school, in Wetherby in the West Riding of Yorkshire. His mother died of tuberculosis when he was 14. He attended the Royal Academy of Music on Marylebone Road in London where his teachers were Paul Steinitz and Lennox Berkeley. He then studied in Paris with Nadia Boulanger and Max Deutsch.

From 1998 until 2008, Maw served on the faculty of the Peabody Institute at Johns Hopkins University, where he taught music composition. He had previously served on the faculties of Yale University, Bard College, Boston University, the Royal Academy of Music, Cambridge University, and Exeter University.

=== Personal life ===
In 1960, Maw married Karen Graham, and they had a son and a daughter. Their marriage was dissolved in 1976. He took up residence in Washington, DC in 1984, living there with his companion Maija Hay, a ceramic artist, until his death. He died at home on 19 May 2009, at age 73, as a result of heart failure with complications from diabetes.

On Sunday 6 November 2011, BBC Radio 3 broadcast a 2-hour tribute called, "Nicholas Maw: A Celebration". The program featured performances of Maw's Violin Concerto, an orchestral suite drawn from his opera, Sophie's Choice, and two choral works (One foot in Eden still, I stand and Hymnus).

== Compositions ==
Maw is best known for Scenes and Arias (1962) for three female voices and orchestra, the orchestral pieces Odyssey (1987) and The World in the Evening (1988), the guitar work Music of Memory (1989) and a violin concerto (1993) written for Joshua Bell. His music has been described as neo-romantic but also as modernist and non-tonal (for instance Personæ, his cycle of piano pieces).

In 2002, the opera Sophie's Choice (based on William Styron's novel) was commissioned by BBC Radio 3 and the Royal Opera House, Covent Garden. It was premièred at the Royal Opera House under the direction of Sir Simon Rattle, and afterwards received a new production by stage director Markus Bothe at the Deutsche Oper Berlin and the Volksoper Wien, which had its North American premiere by the Washington National Opera in October 2006. Mezzo-soprano Angelika Kirchschlager, who sang Sophie in London, reprised the role at the National Opera, joined by American baritone Rod Gilfry as Nathan Landau, the schizophrenic man who initially rescues Sophie and then persuades her to join him in a suicide pact. Maw also prepared a concert suite for orchestra based on the music.

Odyssey was performed in BBC's Maida Vale Studios on 9 December 2005, and was broadcast on BBC Radio 3 two days later. Rattle has also conducted a recording of the work with the City of Birmingham Symphony Orchestra.

== Chronological list of compositions ==
- Eight Chinese Lyrics (1956) for mezzo-soprano
- Requiem (1956–57) for voices & orchestra
- Flute Sonatina (1957)
- Nocturne (1957) for mezzo-soprano & chamber orchestra
- Six Chinese Songs (1959) for contralto & piano
- Five Epigrams (1960) for chorus
- Our Lady's song (1961), carol for chorus
- Chamber Music (1962) for oboe, clarinet, horn, bassoon & piano
- Scenes and Arias (1962, rev. 1966) for soprano, mezzo-soprano, contralto and orchestra
- Round (1963) for children's voices, SATB chorus and piano
- The Angel Gabriel (1963), choral arrangement of Basque melody
- Bulalow (1964), carol for chorus
- One Man Show (1964, rev. 1966 & 1970), opera
- Arrangement of Corpus Christi Carol (1964) for sopranos and piano
- String Quartet No. 1 (1965)
- Severn Bridge Variation (1966) for a composite work with Malcolm Arnold, Michael Tippett, Alun Hoddinott, Grace Williams and Daniel Jones
- Sinfonia (1966) for chamber orchestra
- Six Interiors (1966) for tenor and guitar
- Sonata (1966) for strings and two horns
- The Voice of Love, Eight Peter Porter songs (1966) for mezzo-soprano & piano
- Double Canon for Igor Stravinsky on his 85th Birthday (1967)
- The Rising of the Moon (1967–70), three-act opera
  - Concert Music from The Rising of the Moon (arr. 1972) for orchestra
- Epitaph-Canon in Memory of Igor Stravinsky (1971) for flute, clarinet & harp
- Five Irish Songs (1972) for chorus
- Personae I, II & III (1973) for piano
- Serenade for orchestra (1973, rev. 1977)
- Life Studies (1973–76) for fifteen strings
- Te Deum (1975) for treble or soprano, tenor, SATB chorus, congregation and organ
- Reverdie (1975), five songs for male voices
- Annes! (1976) for unaccompanied SATB chorus
- Nonsense Rhymes for Children (1976), 20 songs with piano accompaniment
- La Vita Nuova (1979), five songs for soprano and chamber ensemble
- The Ruin (1980) for SSAATTBB chorus and solo horn
- Flute Quartet (1981)
- Summer Dances (1981) for orchestra
- Night Thoughts (1982) for solo flute
- String Quartet No. 2 (1982)
- The Old King's Lament (1982) for solo double-bass
- Spring Music (1982–83) for orchestra
- Little Suite (1984) for solo guitar
- Sonata Notturna (1985) for cello & strings
- Personae IV, V & VI (1985–86) for piano
- Little Concert (1987) for oboe, two horns & strings
- Odyssey (1972-5, 1979, 1985-7) for orchestra
- Ghost Dances (1988), imaginary ballet for five players
- The World in the Evening (1988) for orchestra
- Five American Folksongs (1989) for voice & piano
- Music of Memory (1989, rev. 1991) for solo guitar
- Three Hymns (1989), for SATB chorus and organ
- Roman Canticle (1989, rev. 1991) for baritone, flute, viola & harp
- One Foot in Eden Still, I Stand (1990) for mixed chorus and optional organ
- Piano Trio (1990-1)
- American Games (1991) for wind orchestra
- Shahnama (1992) for chamber orchestra
- The Head of Orpheus (1992) for soprano & two clarinets
- Swetė Jesu (1992) for chorus
- Violin Concerto (1993)
- String Quartet No. 3 (1994)
- Dance Scenes (1994–95) for orchestra
- Voices of Memory (1995) for orchestra
- Hymnus (1995–96) for SATB chorus and orchestra
- Solo Violin Sonata (1996–97)
- Stanza (1997) for solo violin
- Narration (2001) for solo cello
- Intrada (2001) for string quartet
- Sophie's Choice (1999-2002), four-act opera based on the William Styron novel
  - Concert Suite from Sophie's Choice (2003) for orchestra with optional mezzo-soprano
  - Tango from Sophie's Choice (2004) for solo guitar
- Fanfare (2004) for brass ensemble
- Concerto for Cor Anglais and Orchestra (2004)
- String Quartet No. 4 (2005)
- String Sextet (2007)

Works lists may be found online.
