= Susanna Styron =

American filmmaker

- Born: 1955
- Occupations: Screenwriter; Film Director; Documentarian
- Children: 2
- Parents: William Styron (father); Rose Burgunder (mother)
- Relatives: Alexandra Styron (sister)
- Website: Susanna Styron Website

Susanna Styron (born 1955) is an American documentary filmmaker, screenwriter, and director. She is best known for her documentaries In Our Own Backyards (1982) and Out Of My Head (2018), along with her fictional feature film debut Shadrach. Her father is American writer William Styron.

== Early life ==
She grew up in Martha's Vineyard and Roxbury, Connecticut. When she was 10 years old her father got her a 8mm camera, which began her film making career.

== Career ==
Styron' first short film In Our Own Backyards (1982), concerned the issues with uranium mining. Under the Regan administration, USIA refused to certify it as an education film, which effected the films ability to avoid customs fees under international treaties. Many other documentaries were suddenly no longer being certified and Styron lead the effort to organize the filmmakers and sue the government. Distributor Bullfrog films ultimately won its lawsuit as the government agency was not being viewpoint neutral and had approved other more pro-business films on radiation as educational.

In 1998 she released her first feature film Shadrach. Styron adapted the film from a short story written by her father, William Styron, that was published in Esquire in 1978. Susanna Styron loved the story immediately upon publication and asked her father to save the rights for her to adapt into a film. Fourteen years later, in 1992, Susanna Styron started the process to get the film produced which ended up taking 5 years. Shadrach was the opening film of the 1998 LA Independent Film Festival. The film also premiered at the Venice Film Festival in 1998. New York Press critic Armond White considered it one of the top ten films of the year.

In the early 2000s, she worked with writing partner Bridget Terry on Hallmark Hall of Fame productions like Back When We Were Grown-Ups in 2004 and In From the Night in 2006. She also directed and wrote an episode of 100 Centre Street, Sidney Lumet's TV series.

In 2018, Styron made a documentary about migraines called Out Of My Head in the hope of increasing understanding and funding into the causes. She made the film after her daughter Emma began to suffer migraines, which lead to Emma becoming the focus of the documentary. It took 8 years to get the film made. Emma called the film-making itself "very validating." The Hollywood Reporter called the film a "heartfelt documentary shedding much-needed light on a too often misunderstood condition."

In 2024, Styron released the short documentary My Father’s Name about a woman finding out her father participated in the lynching of two black men in 1937 when he was 18. Styron also screened her short documentary Suspended Sentence at the Martha’s Vineyard Museum in 2024. It was a short documentary about Martha's Vineyard in the off season using footage Styron shot in 1976. She included shots of people just having fun, hanging out, and also of the unemployment lines to capture the feeling of the time and place.

Styron has also written for newspapers and other publications, such as her article Risk Management in the New York Times about the difference between her and her husband's reaction to an earthquake.

== Personal life ==
Susanna Stryon is the daughter of William Stryon and Rose Burgunder. She is married to actor Darrell Larson and together they have two children.

== Filmography ==
=== Director ===
- My Father's Name (Short, 2024)
- Out of My Head (2018)
- House of Teeth (2017, Short)
- All Downhill from Here (2015, TV series)
- 9/12: From Chaos to Community (2006)
- 100 Centre Street (2001, TV series)
- Shadrach (1998)
- A Day Like Any Other (Short,1987)
- In Our Own Backyards (Short, co-director,1982)
