= Lie Down in Darkness (novel) =

1951 novel by William Styron

- First edition
- Author: William Styron
- Original title: An Inheritance of Night
- Language: English
- Publisher: Bobbs-Merrill
- Publication date: 1951
- Publication place: United States
- Media type: Print (hardback & paperback)
- Pages: 410 pp

Lie Down in Darkness is the first novel by American novelist William Styron, published in 1951. Written when he was 26 years old, the novel received a great deal of critical acclaim.

After graduating from Duke University in 1947, Styron took an editing position with McGraw-Hill in New York City. After provoking his employers into firing him, he set about writing his first novel in earnest. Three years later, he published the novel, Lie Down in Darkness. Styron had first written the book under the working title Inheritance of Night; he made two revisions of the draft before publishing it under its eventual title.

Styron received the Rome Prize for Lie Down in Darkness.

== Plot ==
The novel is about the dysfunctional Virginian Loftis family. It centers on the funeral of Peyton Loftis, one of the daughters, with previous events told in flashbacks by the other characters. The young, psychologically vulnerable Peyton is attached to her father, but finds her mother Helen emotionally remote and oppressive. Helen loathes the spoiled and beautiful Peyton, whom she castigates as a whore. She has given all her love to her disabled daughter, Maudie, leaving no affection for Peyton or her own husband Milton, who finds solace in a shallow mistress. Milton dotes on his beautiful daughter Peyton, but he turns to alcohol as he is spurned by Helen and as Peyton slips away from the family circle. Peyton's own marriage becomes a disaster also, and she eventually commits suicide. The penultimate part is related in a stream of consciousness by Peyton herself. In the last part, a recreation of a revival meeting, it is suggested that only the Loftis family's black servants genuinely mourn Peyton's death.

Styron incorporated many actual locales of his home town, the Hilton Village section of Newport News, Virginia. The character of Helen contains some elements of Styron's own stepmother. Part of the story occurs at the James River Country Club, which is still in operation today.

== Film adaptation ==
In August 2012, a possible film adaptation was announced with Scott Cooper as director, and Kristen Stewart rumored in the lead role of Peyton. However the production company stated: "While it's exciting to see all the interest the project is generating, the film is still in the pre-production process and no offers to cast have been made as of yet."
