= Alexandra Styron =

American author and professor

Claire Alexandra Styron, known as Alexandra Styron, is an American author and professor.

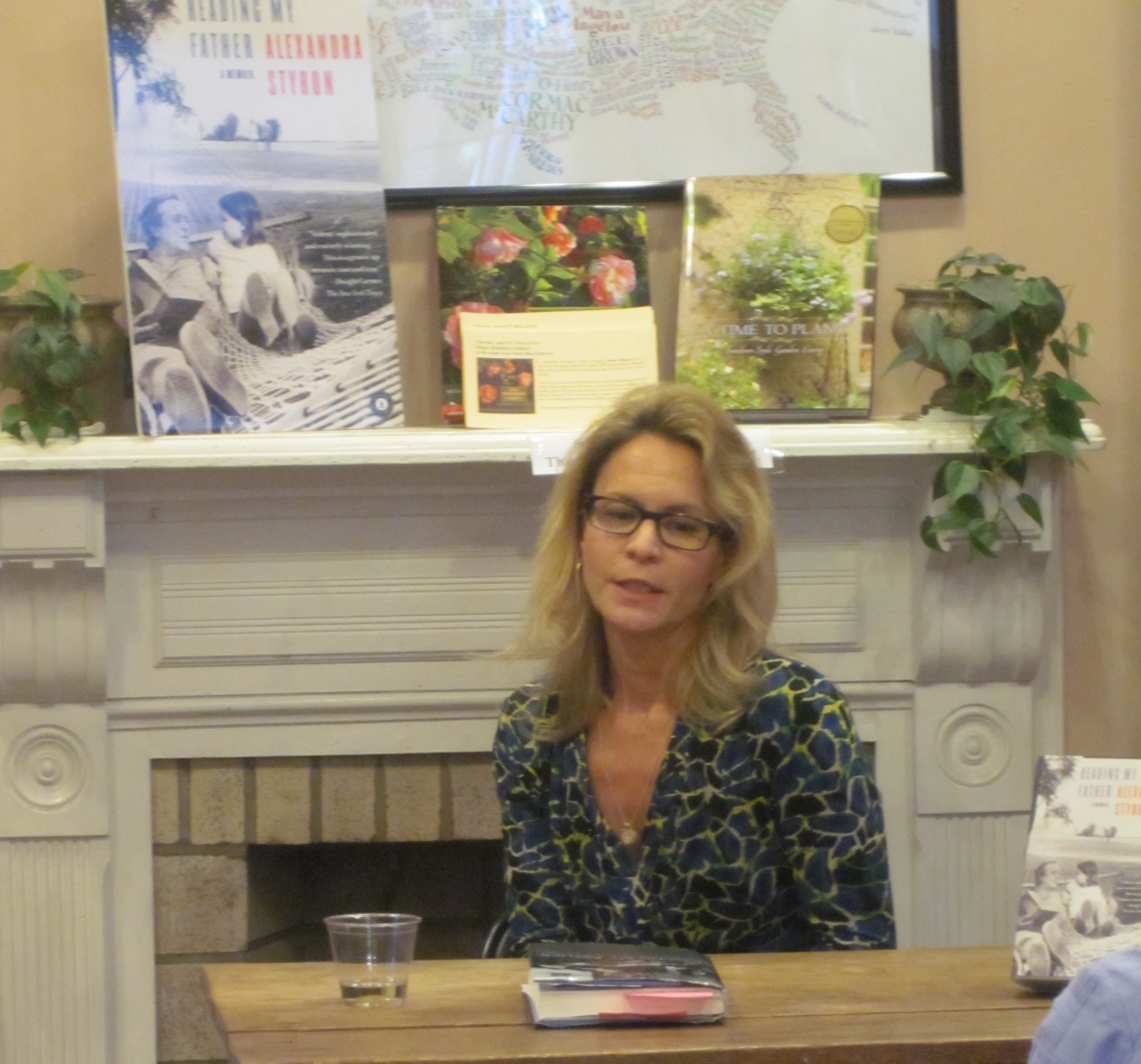
Styron at a book reading in New Orleans, 2012

== Early life and education ==
Styron is the youngest child of author William Styron and poet and human rights activist Rose Burgunder. She grew up in Roxbury, Connecticut, and in Martha's Vineyard. Styron attended Barnard College, and later the MFA Creative Writing program at Columbia University.

She is the godmother to Caroline Kennedy and Edwin Schlossberg's son Jack Schlossberg.

== Career ==
After a brief stint as an actress, Styron turned to writing and is the author of several books. Her most-noted work, the 2011 memoir Reading My Father, detailed her life growing up with the Pulitzer Prize-winning novelist and explored his decades-long struggle with major clinical depression. The book was published by Scribner to strong reviews. In The New York Times Book Review, James Campbell described the book as “brilliant and shocking.” Reading My Father was nominated for the L.A. Times book award and long-listed for The New York Times bestseller list.

Styron is a professor in the MFA Creative Writing program at Hunter College in New York City.

== Selected works ==
- All The Finest Girls (2001), a novel;
- Reading My Father (2011), a memoir about her father, author William Styron;
- Steal This Country: A Handbook for Resistance, Persistence, and Fixing (Almost) Everything (2018), a young adult guide to activism.
